= After Hours til Dawn Tour =

2022–2026 concert tour by the Weeknd

- Tour by the Weeknd
- 2022 promotional art
- Location: Asia; Australia; Europe; North America; South America
- Associated albums: After Hours; Dawn FM; Hurry Up Tomorrow
- Start date: July 14, 2022
- End date: November 5, 2026
- No. of shows: 175
- Supporting acts: Snoh Aalegra; Aerobica; Anitta; Chxrry; Creepy Nuts; Mike Dean; Kaytranada; Anna Lunoe; Playboi Carti; Prince 85; Tayhana; Yousuke Yukimatsu
- Attendance: 5.1 million
- Box office: $1.004 billion (153 shows)
- Website: theweeknd.com/tour/

The Weeknd concert chronology
- The Weeknd Asia Tour (2018); After Hours til Dawn Tour (2022–2026)

The After Hours til Dawn Tour (Note: Originally called the "After Hours Tour", it was renamed to the "After Hours til Dawn Tour" to accommodate the releases of both After Hours (2020) and Dawn FM (2022).) was the seventh concert tour by the Canadian singer-songwriter the Weeknd. It commenced on July 14, 2022, at Lincoln Financial Field in Philadelphia, United States, and concluded on November 5, 2026, at TM Stadium National in Kuala Lumpur, Malaysia. The tour achieved several venue records in Europe and the Americas, and as of 2025, it is one of the most-attended concert tours and one of the highest-grossing concert tours of all time, earning US$1.004 billion across 153 concerts.

Designed to promote his fourth studio album, After Hours (2020), the tour was set to run in arena venues from June 11, 2020, in Vancouver, Canada, to November 16 in London, England. However, following the COVID-19 pandemic, they were postponed to 2021 and 2022, respectively, before being cancelled in favour of stadium venues due to the constraint of arenas. The show was continuously revamped to incorporate the release of his fifth and sixth studio albums, Dawn FM (2022) and Hurry Up Tomorrow (2025), respectively. An accompanying concert film and live album, documenting the November 27, 2022, show at SoFi Stadium, were released in 2023.

== Background ==
On February 20, 2020, the Weeknd announced through social media plans to tour North America and Europe later that year in support of his fourth studio album, After Hours (2020). 88Glam, Sabrina Claudio, and Don Toliver were announced as supporting acts for the tour. The following month, additional concerts were announced in select cities due to demand. In May 2020, following raising concerns of the ongoing COVID-19 pandemic and lockdowns, Live Nation announced plans to postpone all concerts to the following year; rescheduled concerts to commence in June 2021 and conclude in November of the same year. Claudio and Toliver were announced to return as supporting acts, with Toliver only performing for concerts in North America; Black Atlass was announced as co-support for Claudio for European concerts, replacing 88Glam. That November, the National Football League announced the Weeknd would headline the Super Bowl LV halftime show on February 7, 2021. On February 3, 2021, four days prior to the halftime show, the Weeknd and Live Nation announced the tour would be postponed a second time due to the continued concern of the pandemic, with 19 new dates added onto the itinerary for 2022. That October, a third postponement was announced, again for 2022, with venue changes from arenas to stadiums. The Weeknd cited ongoing demand and "constraints of arenas" for the change of venue type.

In January 2022, the Weeknd released his fifth studio album, Dawn FM. Two months later, the newly-retitled After Hours til Dawn Tour was announced, with Doja Cat serving as supporting act. That May, Doja Cat withdrew from the tour as supporting act, citing required surgery on her tonsils. The following month, Snoh Aalegra, Mike Dean, and Kaytranada were announced as the new support acts. During the September 3, 2022, concert at SoFi Stadium in Inglewood, California, the Weeknd abruptly ended the show only three songs in, claiming to have lost his voice; he promised a full refund of the concert, and a "real show soon". He subsequently issued a formal apology on his social media accounts. Twenty-four days later, the rescheduled concert was announced, in addition to a second concert at the venue. That November, concerts in Europe and Latin America were announced. Supplemental shows were subsequently announced due to demand.

On February 2, 2023, the Weeknd announced that a concert film, titled The Weeknd: Live at SoFi Stadium, would premiere on HBO Max on February 25. Seven days later, HBO dropped the trailer for the film, and announced it would air the concert on the network, in addition to the streaming service. A live album Live at SoFi Stadium followed on March 3 of the same year. That August, concerts in Australia and New Zealand were announced to take place between November and December of the same year, with Chxrry22 and Dean serving as supporting acts. Due to demand, additional concerts in Australia were announced; two weeks prior to the November 20 kick off in Brisbane, the dates were postponed to 2024, citing "unforeseen circumstances". In April 2024, it was announced the concerts in New Zealand were cancelled. That August, select concerts in Melbourne and Sydney were announced with Anna Lunoe added as support act, and dates in Brisbane and Auckland cancelled.

On January 31, 2025, the same day his sixth studio album Hurry Up Tomorrow released, concerts in North America were announced, with Dean and Playboi Carti as support acts. That September, additional concerts in Europe and Latin America territories were announced for 2026, with Playboi Carti and Anitta announced as supporting acts, respectively. Additional supplementary dates were subsequently announced. In May 2026, concerts in Asia—promoted as the tour's final leg and called "Live in Asia"—were announced. Creepy Nuts and Yousuke Yukimatsu will serve as the supporting acts for select concerts. The following month supplemental concerts in select cities were announced. That June, Prince 85 was announced as an additional supporting act for the concerts at Etihad Stadium. Prince 85 later acted as a support act for July 2026 concerts in Amsterdam.

== Stage and aesthetic ==
In a press release to Variety, the After Hours til Dawn Tour "will see [the Weeknd's] most ambitious production to date reflecting the creative journey that continues to unfold for both [After Hours and Dawn FM], creating worlds within worlds as we have all been watching unfold in various television performances, music videos and short films bringing these first two pieces of his trilogy to life." The Weeknd's creative director and childhood friend La Mar Taylor explained in an interview with Variety that the tour would be theatrical and conceptual, saying: "There is a linear story between After Hours and Dawn FM, and I think the audience will walk away with different interpretations of the show. To us, that's the whole point." Taylor described the production as a journey "through a cosmic cataclysm that has erupted and plagued the earth. The devastation is widespread and will most likely continue till dawn."

=== North American leg ===
The stage design had three stages: the main stage, showcasing a row of destroyed buildings modeled after the Weeknd's hometown of Toronto, and a screen behind them showing visuals of a futuristic post-apocalyptic skyline; the main stage leads to a catwalk leading into a quadrangular stage, which features an inflatable moon over its edge and also unites the catwalk leading into a circular stage. The show displays the Weeknd performing in all three of these stages, with dancers dressed in red robes which either perform synchronized dance routines or stand motionless. At the start of the show, during "Alone Again" and "Gasoline", he wears a mask which the Los Angeles Times described as "creepy" and makes him resemble "a victim of some botched plastic-surgery procedure." Several times during the show, LED wristbands provided to each attendant by PixMob lit up.

=== European leg ===
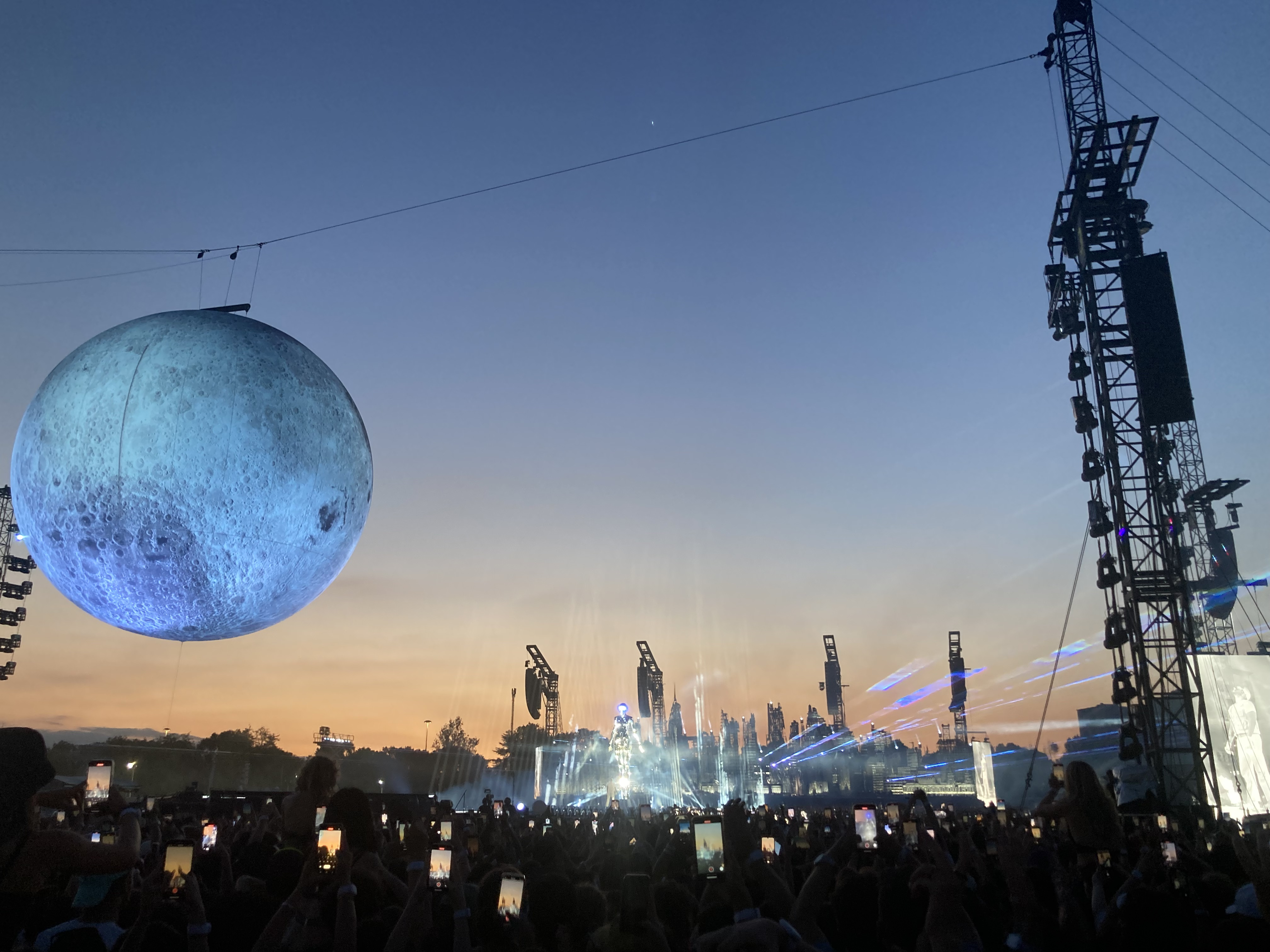
Photo of the stage for the European leg of the tour in 2023, consisting of a large inflatable moon and a Hajime Sorayama statue in the middle of the stage.

During the European leg of the tour, the LED screen was removed in order to place more building statues, making the previous skyline fully physical. The ruined chrome city is described by The Guardian as "a vast metallic cityscape" which consists of ruined landmarks such as Toronto's CN Tower and the Empire State Building. The Weeknd's band members play on top of their own individual buildings, with the Weeknd performing half of the setlist wearing a white coat hoodie and his face concealed by an MF Doom-inspired mask, finally removing his mask before "Faith". The first leg's rusty orange destroyed buildings were changed to shiny chrome skyscrapers, with this leg intended to follow Dawn FM's overall theme. The walkway consists of a moon which was present in the first leg of the tour with a Hajime Sorayama statue of the robot present in the 10-year anniversary music video for the titular track of "Echoes of Silence" added in the middle of the stage.

For the 2026 European leg, the stage production was updated with a new 40-foot gold sculpture created by Hajime Sorayama, replacing the smaller silver statue used during earlier legs of the tour. Unlike the 2023 European leg, the LED screen was reintroduced as part of the stage design. The production also featured golden ruins, immersive visuals, lasers and pyrotechnic effects, continuing the tour's dystopian cityscape aesthetic while incorporating visual elements associated with Hurry Up Tomorrow.

=== Latin American leg ===
The skyline behind the band members was removed with a 6-meter high LED screen returning from the North American leg to display visuals for specific songs similarly to the first leg of the tour. The buildings remain chrome coloured with the Sorayama statue, and inflatable moon remain on the stage. The Weeknd's outfit was changed to a sleeveless full body camo suit, with his left arm covered in a metallic arm sleeve along with a metallic helmet with a LED visor, which Complex described as "Robocop-like." The show opened with a dark purple skyline as "La Fama" played in a remixed, vocoded version, with the Weeknd originally wearing a black overcoat hoodie for the first two tracks, until October 7, 2023.

== Concert synopsis ==
=== 2022 ===
As the show begins, dancers appear from below the set's centerpiece. Then, the Weeknd emerges from one of the buildings, with a clear face mask, alongside a car-length coat. The intro begins with what Variety describes as an electro version of the opener from After Hours, "Alone Again". Following this, he comes down the stage with the dancers, where the pace of the tour speeds up, as a new-wave take on "Gasoline", from Dawn FM, plays. During the end of "Gasoline", the clear mask face is taken off, revealing the Weeknd's face, as he grins at the crowd.

The Weeknd continues performing songs from Dawn FM immediately after, as "Sacrifice" and "How Do I Make You Love Me?" come next, which Rolling Stone writes as if the songs were performed to give both After Hours and Dawn FM "their due", referring to the first songs in the set list only being songs from those two albums. After "How Do I Make You Love Me?" the Weeknd's 2015 song, "Can't Feel My Face", begins playing, as the stage gets engulfed in smoke. Following "Can't Feel My Face", he performs his own verse from Kanye West's 2021 song "Hurricane".

=== 2023 ===
In 2023, the tour's visual and physical production was reimagined: towering chrome building sculptures formed a crumbling, post-apocalyptic cityscape in place of the LED skyline used in North America. The aesthetic leaned into dystopian and Gotham-style motifs, with smoke, dramatic lighting, and architectural ruin visuals enhancing the thematic continuity of the After Hours and Dawn FM chapters. During the concerts in Europe, the show retained its theatricality with the Weeknd appearing in a chrome mask that concealed his face for early segments before dramatic removal mid-set, heightening the ritualistic reveal. During Latin American dates, the staging was adjusted: the physical cityscape elements remained, but a large LED wall was installed behind the band to project immersive visual content. Costumes became more experimental: Tesfaye wore a sleeveless camo-style suit combined with a metallic arm sleeve and a LED visor helmet, evoking a sci-fi warrior persona. The mask removal remained a dramatic moment in the performance.

=== 2024 ===
With the 2024 shows, the framework established in 2023 carried forward with refinements for stadium environments. Lighting design was adjusted for open-air venues, widening sight-lines and intensifying backlight effects. New material from Hurry Up Tomorrow was integrated into the show, leading to some rearrangement of transitions and staging flow to accommodate newer songs. The mask/reveal concept persisted as a structural dramatic pivot.

=== 2025 ===
For the 2025 concerts, the tour had fully evolved into a stadium spectacle emphasizing scale and immersion. Productions featured dramatic set extensions, enhanced lighting rigs, and seamless visual transitions tying together older and newer material. Shows often began with the Weeknd masked, peeling it off at climactic points in the performance to highlight the contrast between persona and artist. In some concerts, the removal carried symbolic weight, underscored by gestures and declarations of identity onstage. The staging embraced maximalism: sweeping runways into the crowd, large LED arrays, choreographed theatrical cues, dynamic costume contrasts, pyrotechnics, and carefully timed reveal moments combined performance, narrative, and visual artistry into a cinematic experience.

== Commercial performance ==
=== Boxscore ===
The tour surpassed US$148 million in gross sales and sold more than one million tickets in its first leg across North America. According to Variety, the tour generated over $350 million in gross sales by July 2023. In August 2025, Billboard reported the After Hours til Dawn Tour had grossed $635.5 million in revenue and sold 5.1 million tickets since its 2022 launch, becoming the biggest R&B tour in history, beating previous record holders Beyoncé (Renaissance World Tour, 2023) and Bruno Mars (24K Magic World Tour, 2017–2018). By November 2025, the tour had grossed US$1.004 billion with approximately 7.55 million tickets sold, becoming the highest-earning tour by a male solo artist.

In their year-end report for 2025, Billboard recognized the tour as the fourth-best tour of the year. Similarly, Pollstar named the tour as the sixth-most lucrative tour of 2025, with an average gross of US$7.3 million based on 42 reported shows. In June 2026, Billboard reported that concerts held that year had exceeded three million attendees and generated US$440 million in ticket sales.

=== Venue records ===
Venue records of the After Hours til Dawn Tour
| Year | Period | Venue | Region | Description | Ref. |
|---|---|---|---|---|---|
| 2023 | July 7–8 | London Stadium | England | Biggest two-day attendance (159,574). | |
| 2023 | July 8 | London Stadium | England | Biggest single-day attendance (80,000). | |
| 2023 | July 22–23 | Allianz Riviera | France | Biggest attendance of all time (70,000). | |
| 2023 | July 26–27 | Ippodromo Snai La Maura | Italy | First act to perform two sold-out shows on a single tour. | |
| 2023 | August 18 | Wembley Stadium | England | Biggest single-day attendance for a traditional stage set-up (89,179). | |
| 2023 | October 7 | Estádio Nilton Santos | Brazil | Biggest single-day attendance (71,363). | |
| 2025 | June 5–7 | MetLife Stadium | United States | Highest-grossing Black male artist to perform in the venue (163,000+ attendance over 3 days). | |
| 2025 | September 2, November 26–27, 2022; July 25–26 and 28–29, 2025 | SoFi Stadium | United States | Most sold-out shows by a male artist in the venue & by an artist in a single tour (7 shows). | |
| 2025 | July 8 | Levi's Stadium | United States | Highest-grossing male artist to perform in the venue. | |
| 2025 | July 12 | Lumen Field | United States | Highest-grossing Black male solo artist to perform in the venue. | |
| 2025 | July 19 | Commonwealth Stadium | Canada | Most tickets sold by a Black male artist at the venue. | |
| 2025 | August 30–31 | NRG Stadium | United States | Highest-grossing Black male artist to headline the venue. (Note: This record excludes the Houston Livestock Show and Rodeo.) | |
| 2025 | September 22–23, 2022; July 27–28, and August 7–8, 2025 | Rogers Centre | Canada | Most sold-out shows by a male solo artist and also any Canadian artist at the venue (6 shows) | |

== Philanthropy ==
In March 2022, the Weeknd launched the XO Humanitarian Fund in collaboration with the World Food Programme (WFP) in an effort to bring 44 million "back from the brink of famine". As part of this effort, he donated US$500,000 into the fund, and pledged to donate US$1 per every ticket sold from the tour. That June, Binance announced they were donating US$2 million to the Fund, and by November, it was reported US$5 million had been raised and presented to the WFP. In April 2024, via the foundation, he pledged US$2 million to the WFP in an effort to assist Gaza on the ongoing war within the country. In January of the following year, the Weeknd donated US$1 million in relief funds to Los Angeles wildfire relief following the Southern California wildfires that same month; he also teamed up with Global Citizen, and pledged US$1 from every ticket told in his recently announced concert dates to support vulnerable children in various communities. As of November 2025, US$8.5 million had been donated to the XO Humanitarian Fund and Global Citizen.

== Set list ==
=== July 2022 to June 2023 ===
This set list is from the concert in Philadelphia on July 14, 2022. It does not represent all concerts for the tour.

1. "Alone Again"
2. "Gasoline"
3. "Sacrifice" (Swedish House Mafia remix)
4. "How Do I Make You Love Me?"
5. "Can't Feel My Face"
6. "Take My Breath"
7. "Hurricane"
8. "The Hills"
9. "Often"
10. "Crew Love"
11. "Starboy"
12. "Heartless"
13. "Low Life"
14. "Or Nah"
15. "Kiss Land"
16. "Party Monster"
17. "Faith"
18. "After Hours"
19. "Out of Time"
20. "I Feel It Coming"
21. "Die for You"
22. "Is There Someone Else?"
23. "I Was Never There"
24. "Wicked Games"
25. "Call Out My Name"
26. "The Morning"
27. "Save Your Tears"
28. "Less than Zero"
29. "Blinding Lights"

=== June to October 2023 ===
This set list is from the concert in Dublin on June 28, 2023. It does not represent all concerts for the tour.

1. "Take My Breath"
2. "Sacrifice" (Swedish House Mafia remix)
3. "How Do I Make You Love Me?"
4. "Can't Feel My Face"
5. "Lost in the Fire"
6. "Hurricane"
7. "The Hills"
8. "Often"
9. "Crew Love"
10. "Starboy"
11. "House of Balloons"
12. "Heartless"
13. "Low Life"
14. "Reminder"
15. "Party Monster"
16. "Faith"
17. "After Hours"
18. "Out of Time"
19. "I Feel It Coming"
20. "Die for You"
21. "Is There Someone Else?"
22. "I Was Never There"
23. "Wicked Games"
24. "Call Out My Name"
25. "The Morning"
26. "Save Your Tears"
27. "Less than Zero"
28. "Blinding Lights"

Encore

29. "Double Fantasy"
30. "Creepin'"
31. "Popular"

=== Alterations ===
During the August 2023 concerts in London, the following alterations were made:

- "Dawn FM", "Kiss Land", "Tears in the Rain", "In Your Eyes", and "Moth to a Flame", respectively, were added to the set list.
- "Double Fantasy" was omitted from the set list.

=== October 2023 to October 2024 ===
This set list is from the concert in Rio de Janeiro on October 7, 2023. It does not represent all concerts for the tour.

1. "La Fama"
2. "False Alarm"
3. "Party Monster"
4. "Take My Breath"
5. "How Do I Make You Love Me?"
6. "Can't Feel My Face"
7. "Lost in the Fire"
8. "Hurricane"
9. "The Hills"
10. "Kiss Land"
11. "Often"
12. "Crew Love"
13. "Starboy"
14. "Pray for Me"
15. "House of Balloons"
16. "Heartless"
17. "Low Life"
18. "Reminder"
19. "Circus Maximus"
20. "Faith"
21. "After Hours"
22. "Earned It"
23. "In the Night"
24. "Love Me Harder"
25. "Out of Time"
26. "I Feel It Coming"
27. "Die for You"
28. "Is There Someone Else?"
29. "I Was Never There"
30. "Wicked Games"
31. "Call Out My Name"
32. "The Morning"
33. "Save Your Tears"
34. "Less than Zero"
35. "Blinding Lights"
36. "Tears in the Rain"
37. "Creepin'"
38. "Popular"
39. "In Your Eyes"
40. "Moth to a Flame"

==== Alterations ====
During the October 2024 concerts in Australia, the following alterations were made:

- "The Crowd", "Wake Me Up", "São Paulo", "Dancing in the Flames", "Too Late", and "Open Hearts", respectively, were added to the set list.
- "La Fama" was omitted from the set list.

=== May to September 2025 ===
This set list is from the concert in Glendale (Note: Labelled as Phoenix in promotional material.) on May 9, 2025. It does not represent all concerts for the tour.

1. "The Abyss"
2. "Wake Me Up"
3. "After Hours"
4. "Opening Night"
5. "Starboy"
6. "Heartless"
7. "Faith"
8. "Take My Breath"
9. "Sacrifice"
10. "How Do I Make You Love Me?"
11. "Can't Feel My Face"
12. "Lost in the Fire"
13. "Often"
14. "Given Up on Me"
15. "I Was Never There"
16. "The Hills"
17. "Baptized in Fear"
18. "Open Hearts"
19. "Cry for Me"
20. "São Paulo"
21. "Timeless"
22. "Rather Lie"
23. "Creepin'"
24. "Niagara Falls"
25. "One of the Girls"
26. "Out of Time"
27. "I Feel It Coming"
28. "Die for You"
29. "Is There Someone Else?"
30. "Wicked Games"
31. "Call Out My Name"
32. "Hurry Up Tomorrow"
33. "Save Your Tears"
34. "Less than Zero"
35. "Blinding Lights"
36. "In Heaven"
37. "Moth to a Flame"

=== April to May 2026 ===
This set list is from the concert in Mexico City on April 20, 2026. It does not represent all concerts for the tour.

1. "Baptized in Fear"
2. "Open Hearts"
3. "Wake Me Up"
4. "After Hours"
5. "Starboy"
6. "Heartless"
7. "Faith"
8. "Cry for Me"
9. "I Can't Fucking Sing"
10. "São Paulo"
11. "Take My Breath"
12. "Sacrifice"
13. "How Do I Make You Love Me?"
14. "Can't Feel My Face"
15. "Lost in the Fire"
16. "Timeless"
17. "Often"
18. "Given Up on Me"
19. "I Was Never There"
20. "The Hills"
21. "Creepin'"
22. "Niagara Falls"
23. "One of the Girls"
24. "Stargirl Interlude"
25. "Out of Time"
26. "I Feel It Coming"
27. "Die for You"
28. "Is There Someone Else?"
29. "Wicked Games"
30. "Call Out My Name"
31. "The Morning"
32. "Save Your Tears"
33. "Less than Zero"
34. "Blinding Lights"
35. "Without a Warning"
36. "House of Balloons"
37. "Moth to a Flame"

=== Since June 2026 ===
This set list is from the concert in Manchester on June 11, 2026. It does not represent all concerts for the tour.

1. "Baptized in Fear"
2. "Open Hearts"
3. "Wake Me Up"
4. "After Hours"
5. "Starboy"
6. "Heartless"
7. "Faith"
8. "Cry for Me"
9. "São Paulo"
10. "Until We're Skin & Bones"
11. "Take My Breath"
12. "Sacrifice"
13. "How Do I Make You Love Me?"
14. "Eva"
15. "Can't Feel My Face"
16. "Lost in the Fire"
17. "Often"
18. "Given Up on Me"
19. "I Was Never There"
20. "The Hills"
21. "Timeless"
22. "Rather Lie"
23. "Creepin'"
24. "Niagara Falls"
25. "One of the Girls"
26. "Stargirl Interlude"
27. "Out of Time"
28. "I Feel It Coming"
29. "Die for You"
30. "Is There Someone Else?"
31. "Wicked Games"
32. "Call Out My Name"
33. "The Abyss"
34. "Professional"
35. "Save Your Tears"
36. "Less than Zero"
37. "Blinding Lights"
38. "Without a Warning"
39. "House of Balloons"
40. "Moth to a Flame"

== Shows ==
List of 2022 concerts
| Date (2022) | City | Country | Venue | Supporting acts | Attendance | Revenue |
|---|---|---|---|---|---|---|
| July 14 | Philadelphia | United States | Lincoln Financial Field | Mike Dean; Kaytranada | 46,486 / 46,486 | $5,131,280 |
| July 16 (Note: A trailer for the Weeknd's then-upcoming HBO series, The Idol, premiered at this concert right before he took the stage. The trailer would later be played before the concerts at Soldier Field in Chicago, Ford Field in Detroit, and Raymond James Stadium in Tampa.) | East Rutherford (Note: Labelled as New York City in promotional material.) | United States | MetLife Stadium | Mike Dean; Kaytranada | 54,703 / 54,703 | $9,890,367 |
| July 21 | Foxborough (Note: Labelled as Boston in promotional material.) | United States | Gillette Stadium | Mike Dean; Kaytranada | 48,993 / 56,257 | $6,278,792 |
| July 24 | Chicago | United States | Soldier Field | Mike Dean; Kaytranada | 48,887 / 48,887 | $7,691,796 |
| July 27 | Detroit | United States | Ford Field | Mike Dean; Kaytranada | 45,609 / 45,609 | $4,985,501 |
| July 30 | Landover (Note: Labelled as Washington, D.C., in promotional material.) | United States | FedExField | Mike Dean; Kaytranada | 40,175 / 40,480 | $5,929,459 |
| August 4 | Tampa | United States | Raymond James Stadium | Kaytranada | 49,941 / 49,941 | $6,116,238 |
| August 6 | Miami Gardens | United States | Hard Rock Stadium | Mike Dean; Kaytranada | 45,142 / 66,684 | $6,470,071 |
| August 11 | Atlanta | United States | Mercedes-Benz Stadium | Mike Dean; Snoh Aalegra | 46,836 / 46,836 | $6,539,838 |
| August 14 | Arlington | United States | AT&T Stadium | Mike Dean; Snoh Aalegra | 49,783 / 49,783 | $8,043,625 |
| August 18 | Denver | United States | Empower Field at Mile High | Mike Dean; Kaytranada | 51,472 / 51,472 | $6,307,858 |
| August 20 (Note: A second trailer for The Idol premiered at this concert before he took the stage.) | Paradise (Note: Labelled as Las Vegas in promotional material.) | United States | Allegiant Stadium | Mike Dean; Kaytranada | 44,321 / 44,321 | $8,267,750 |
| August 23 | Vancouver | Canada | BC Place | Mike Dean; Kaytranada | 41,219 / 41,219 | $4,898,517 |
| August 25 | Seattle | United States | Lumen Field | Mike Dean; Snoh Aalegra | 51,556 / 51,556 | $7,071,186 |
| August 27 | Santa Clara | United States | Levi's Stadium | Mike Dean; Snoh Aalegra | 49,227 / 49,227 | $9,599,671 |
| August 30 | Glendale | United States | State Farm Stadium | Mike Dean; Kaytranada | 53,969 / 61,300 | $6,200,909 |
| September 2 (Note: A third trailer for The Idol premiered at this concert before he took the stage. In addition, some scenes for the series were filmed on stage at the stadium prior to the concert with both Lily-Rose Depp and the Weeknd.) | Inglewood (Note: Labelled as Los Angeles in promotional material.) | United States | SoFi Stadium | Mike Dean; Kaytranada | 49,324 / 49,324 | $11,132,108 |
| September 22 (Note: The concert of September 22, 2022, at Rogers Centre in Toronto was originally set to take place on July 8, 2022, as the first stop of the tour, but was rescheduled due to the 2022 Rogers Communications outage.) | Toronto | Canada | Rogers Centre | Mike Dean; Kaytranada | 87,101 / 87,101 | $10,231,250 |
| September 23 | Toronto | Canada | Rogers Centre | Mike Dean; Kaytranada | 87,101 / 87,101 | $10,231,250 |
| November 26 (Note: The concert of November 26, 2022, at SoFi Stadium in Inglewood originally took place on September 3; however, during that concert, The Weeknd lost his voice during "Alone Again" and continued the show until "Can't Feel My Face", after which he came onstage to say he lost his voice and that everyone in attendance would receive a refund or have their tickets honoured for the rescheduled show.) (Note: The stage and crowd from the show on November 26, 2022, were used in the final episode of The Idol, where Jocelyn speaks to the crowd before she "performs".) | Inglewood | United States | SoFi Stadium | Mike Dean; Kaytranada | 97,700 / 97,700 | $17,620,145 |
| November 27 | Inglewood | United States | SoFi Stadium | Mike Dean; Kaytranada | 97,700 / 97,700 | $17,620,145 |

List of 2023 concerts
| Date (2023) | City | Country | Venue | Supporting acts | Attendance | Revenue |
|---|---|---|---|---|---|---|
| June 6 | Algés | Portugal | Passeio Marítimo de Algés | Mike Dean; Kaytranada | 59,928 / 59,928 | $5,308,581 |
| June 10 | Manchester | England | Etihad Stadium | Mike Dean; Kaytranada | 52,972 / 52,972 | $5,293,048 |
| June 14 | Horsens | Denmark | Nordstern Arena | Mike Dean; Kaytranada | 26,354 / 26,354 | $3,616,107 |
| June 17 | Stockholm | Sweden | Tele2 Arena | Mike Dean; Kaytranada | 70,130 / 70,130 | $5,196,225 |
| June 18 | Stockholm | Sweden | Tele2 Arena | Mike Dean; Kaytranada | 70,130 / 70,130 | $5,196,225 |
| June 20 | Oslo | Norway | Telenor Arena | Mike Dean; Kaytranada | 23,332 / 23,332 | $1,919,784 |
| June 23 | Amsterdam | Netherlands | Johan Cruyff Arena | Mike Dean; Kaytranada | 103,181 / 104,406 | $10,066,993 |
| June 24 | Amsterdam | Netherlands | Johan Cruyff Arena | Mike Dean; Kaytranada | 103,181 / 104,406 | $10,066,993 |
| June 28 | Dublin | Ireland | Marlay Park | Mike Dean; Kaytranada | 36,251 / 36,251 | $3,468,512 |
| July 2 | Hamburg | Germany | Volksparkstadion | Mike Dean; Kaytranada | 46,771 / 46,771 | $4,191,685 |
| July 4 | Düsseldorf | Germany | Merkur Spiel-Arena | Mike Dean; Kaytranada | 46,932 / 46,932 | $4,346,049 |
| July 7 | London | England | London Stadium | Mike Dean; Kaytranada | 159,574 / 159,574 | $17,117,477 |
| July 8 | London | England | London Stadium | Mike Dean; Kaytranada | 159,574 / 159,574 | $17,117,477 |
| July 11 | Brussels | Belgium | King Baudouin Stadium | Mike Dean; Kaytranada | 103,297 / 103,297 | $8,983,571 |
| July 12 | Brussels | Belgium | King Baudouin Stadium | Mike Dean; Kaytranada | 103,297 / 103,297 | $8,983,571 |
| July 14 | Frankfurt | Germany | Deutsche Bank Park | Mike Dean; Kaytranada | 47,169 / 47,169 | $4,577,212 |
| July 18 | Madrid | Spain | Estádio Cívitas Metropolitano | Mike Dean; Kaytranada | 54,568 / 54,568 | $4,934,255 |
| July 20 | Barcelona | Spain | Estadi Olímpic Lluís Companys | Mike Dean; Kaytranada | 54,017 / 54,017 | $5,484,112 |
| July 22 | Nice | France | Allianz Riviera | Mike Dean; Kaytranada | 69,200 / 69,200 | $7,335,862 |
| July 23 | Nice | France | Allianz Riviera | Mike Dean; Kaytranada | 69,200 / 69,200 | $7,335,862 |
| July 26 | Milan | Italy | Ippodromo Snai La Maura | Mike Dean; Kaytranada | 158,707 / 159,694 | $12,908,985 |
| July 27 | Milan | Italy | Ippodromo Snai La Maura | Mike Dean; Kaytranada | 158,707 / 159,694 | $12,908,985 |
| July 29 | Saint-Denis (Note: Labelled as Paris in promotional material.) | France | Stade de France | Mike Dean; Kaytranada | 150,610 / 151,974 | $15,858,996 |
| July 30 | Saint-Denis | France | Stade de France | Mike Dean; Kaytranada | 150,610 / 151,974 | $15,858,996 |
| August 1 | Bordeaux | France | Matmut Atlantique | Mike Dean; Kaytranada | 38,251 / 38,251 | $3,952,106 |
| August 4 | Munich | Germany | Olympiastadion | Mike Dean; Kaytranada | 72,011 / 72,011 | $6,338,259 |
| August 6 | Prague | Czech Republic | Letňany | Mike Dean; Kaytranada | 60,714 / 60,714 | $6,388,155 |
| August 9 | Warsaw | Poland | PGE Narodowy | Mike Dean; Kaytranada | 62,007 / 62,007 | $6,477,909 |
| August 12 | Tallinn | Estonia | Tallinn Song Festival Grounds | Mike Dean; Kaytranada | 53,458 / 53,458 | $5,086,827 |
| August 18 | London | England | Wembley Stadium | Mike Dean; Kaytranada | 89,179 / 89,179 | $9,250,620 |
| September 26 | Guadalupe (Note: Labelled as Monterrey in promotional material.) | Mexico | Estadio BBVA | Mike Dean; Kaytranada | 46,791 / 46,791 | $5,689,051 |
| September 29 | Mexico City | Mexico | Foro Sol | Mike Dean; Kaytranada | 129,707 / 129,707 | $11,097,399 |
| September 30 | Mexico City | Mexico | Foro Sol | Mike Dean; Kaytranada | 129,707 / 129,707 | $11,097,399 |
| October 4 | Bogotá | Colombia | Estadio El Campín | Mike Dean; Kaytranada | 35,386 / 35,386 | $3,117,966 |
| October 7 | Rio de Janeiro | Brazil | Estádio Nilton Santos | Mike Dean; Kaytranada | 71,363 / 71,363 | $5,153,492 |
| October 10 | São Paulo | Brazil | Allianz Parque | Mike Dean; Kaytranada | 97,892 / 97,892 | $9,208,211 |
| October 11 | São Paulo | Brazil | Allianz Parque | Mike Dean; Kaytranada | 97,892 / 97,892 | $9,208,211 |
| October 15 | Santiago | Chile | Estadio Bicentenario de La Florida | Mike Dean; Kaytranada; Aerobica | 50,132 / 50,142 | $5,062,150 |
| October 16 | Santiago | Chile | Estadio Bicentenario de La Florida | Mike Dean; Kaytranada; Aerobica | 50,132 / 50,142 | $5,062,150 |
| October 18 (Note: The concert of October 18, 2023, at Estadio River Plate in Buenos Aires was originally set to take place on October 13, 2023, at the Hipódromo de San Isidro, but it was rescheduled due to the venue change.) | Buenos Aires | Argentina | Estadio River Plate | Mike Dean; Kaytranada; Tayhana | 116,694 / 116,694 | $5,093,887 |
| October 19 | Buenos Aires | Argentina | Estadio River Plate | Mike Dean; Kaytranada; Tayhana | 116,694 / 116,694 | $5,093,887 |
| October 22 | Lima | Peru | Estadio Universidad San Marcos | Mike Dean; Kaytranada | 41,191 / 41,191 | $4,032,616 |
| October 25 | Zapopan (Note: Labelled as Guadalajara in promotional material.) | Mexico | Estadio Akron | Mike Dean; Kaytranada | 41,145 / 41,145 | $5,935,783 |

List of 2024 concerts
| Date (2024) | City | Country | Venue | Supporting acts | Attendance | Revenue |
|---|---|---|---|---|---|---|
| October 5 | Melbourne | Australia | Marvel Stadium | Mike Dean; Chxrry22; Anna Lunoe | 92,092 / 92,092 | $12,519,035 |
| October 6 | Melbourne | Australia | Marvel Stadium | Mike Dean; Chxrry22; Anna Lunoe | 92,092 / 92,092 | $12,519,035 |
| October 22 | Sydney | Australia | Accor Stadium | Mike Dean; Chxrry22; Anna Lunoe | 118,968 / 118,968 | $13,596,963 |
| October 23 | Sydney | Australia | Accor Stadium | Mike Dean; Chxrry22; Anna Lunoe | 118,968 / 118,968 | $13,596,963 |

List of 2025 concerts
| Date (2025) | City | Country | Venue | Supporting acts | Attendance | Revenue |
|---|---|---|---|---|---|---|
| May 9 | Glendale | United States | State Farm Stadium | Playboi Carti; Mike Dean | 58,209 / 58,209 | $8,709,847 |
| May 24 | Detroit | United States | Ford Field | Playboi Carti; Mike Dean | 78,144 / 78,144 | $9,144,437 |
| May 25 | Detroit | United States | Ford Field | Playboi Carti; Mike Dean | 78,144 / 78,144 | $9,144,437 |
| May 30 | Chicago | United States | Soldier Field | Playboi Carti; Mike Dean | 96,042 / 96,042 | $16,694,072 |
| May 31 | Chicago | United States | Soldier Field | Playboi Carti; Mike Dean | 96,042 / 96,042 | $16,694,072 |
| June 5 | East Rutherford | United States | MetLife Stadium | Playboi Carti; Mike Dean | 162,831 / 162,831 | $29,796,461 |
| June 6 | East Rutherford | United States | MetLife Stadium | Playboi Carti; Mike Dean | 162,831 / 162,831 | $29,796,461 |
| June 7 | East Rutherford | United States | MetLife Stadium | Playboi Carti; Mike Dean | 162,831 / 162,831 | $29,796,461 |
| June 10 | Foxborough | United States | Gillette Stadium | Playboi Carti; Mike Dean | 88,432 / 88,432 | $11,498,903 |
| June 11 | Foxborough | United States | Gillette Stadium | Playboi Carti; Mike Dean | 88,432 / 88,432 | $11,498,903 |
| June 14 | Minneapolis | United States | U.S. Bank Stadium | Playboi Carti; Mike Dean | 47,730 / 47,730 | $5,818,152 |
| June 21 | Denver | United States | Empower Field at Mile High | Playboi Carti; Mike Dean | 63,668 / 63,668 | $8,885,868 |
| June 25 | Inglewood | United States | SoFi Stadium | Playboi Carti; Mike Dean | 199,288 / 199,288 | $34,039,630 |
| June 26 | Inglewood | United States | SoFi Stadium | Playboi Carti; Mike Dean | 199,288 / 199,288 | $34,039,630 |
| June 28 | Inglewood | United States | SoFi Stadium | Playboi Carti; Mike Dean | 199,288 / 199,288 | $34,039,630 |
| June 29 | Inglewood | United States | SoFi Stadium | Playboi Carti; Mike Dean | 199,288 / 199,288 | $34,039,630 |
| July 5 | Paradise | United States | Allegiant Stadium | Playboi Carti; Mike Dean | 52,441 / 52,441 | $10,041,464 |
| July 8 | Santa Clara | United States | Levi's Stadium | Playboi Carti; Mike Dean | 100,230 / 100,230 | $17,087,714 |
| July 9 | Santa Clara | United States | Levi's Stadium | Playboi Carti; Mike Dean | 100,230 / 100,230 | $17,087,714 |
| July 12 | Seattle | United States | Lumen Field | Playboi Carti; Mike Dean | 62,483 / 62,483 | $9,969,625 |
| July 15 | Vancouver | Canada | BC Place | Mike Dean | 83,252 / 83,252 | $10,251,023 |
| July 16 | Vancouver | Canada | BC Place | Mike Dean | 83,252 / 83,252 | $10,251,023 |
| July 19 | Edmonton | Canada | Commonwealth Stadium | Mike Dean | 54,076 / 54,076 | $7,002,903 |
| July 24 | Montreal | Canada | Parc Jean-Drapeau | Kaytranada; Mike Dean | 79,032 / 79,032 | $9,992,306 |
| July 25 | Montreal | Canada | Parc Jean-Drapeau | Kaytranada; Mike Dean | 79,032 / 79,032 | $9,992,306 |
| July 27 | Toronto | Canada | Rogers Centre | Kaytranada; Mike Dean | 158,324 / 158,324 (Note: The concerts in Toronto on July 27–28 and August 7–8, 2025, had their data combined into a single boxscore.) | $24,902,654 |
| July 28 | Toronto | Canada | Rogers Centre | Kaytranada; Mike Dean | 158,324 / 158,324 | $24,902,654 |
| July 30 | Philadelphia | United States | Lincoln Financial Field | Playboi Carti; Mike Dean | 103,162 / 103,162 | $12,793,172 |
| July 31 | Philadelphia | United States | Lincoln Financial Field | Playboi Carti | 103,162 / 103,162 | $12,793,172 |
| August 2 | Landover | United States | Northwest Stadium | Playboi Carti; Mike Dean | 43,625 / 43,625 | $6,906,975 |
| August 7 | Toronto | Canada | Rogers Centre | Kaytranada; Mike Dean | | |
| August 8 | Toronto | Canada | Rogers Centre | Kaytranada; Mike Dean | | |
| August 12 | Nashville | United States | Nissan Stadium | Playboi Carti; Mike Dean | 46,930 / 46,930 | $5,361,232 |
| August 15 | Miami Gardens | United States | Hard Rock Stadium | Playboi Carti; Mike Dean | 87,172 / 87,172 | $13,628,869 |
| August 16 | Miami Gardens | United States | Hard Rock Stadium | Playboi Carti; Mike Dean | 87,172 / 87,172 | $13,628,869 |
| August 21 | Atlanta | United States | Mercedes-Benz Stadium | Playboi Carti; Mike Dean | 49,695 / 49,695 | $8,627,354 |
| August 24 | Orlando | United States | Camping World Stadium | Playboi Carti; Mike Dean | 52,083 / 52,083 | $9,062,680 |
| August 27 | Arlington | United States | AT&T Stadium | Playboi Carti; Mike Dean | 89,608 / 89,608 | $13,175,464 |
| August 28 | Arlington | United States | AT&T Stadium | Playboi Carti; Mike Dean | 89,608 / 89,608 | $13,175,464 |
| August 30 | Houston | United States | NRG Stadium | Playboi Carti; Mike Dean | 97,042 / 97,042 | $14,615,640 |
| August 31 | Houston | United States | NRG Stadium | Playboi Carti; Mike Dean | 97,042 / 97,042 | $14,615,640 |
| September 3 | San Antonio | United States | Alamodome | Playboi Carti; Mike Dean | 51,796 / 51,796 | $8,249,244 |

List of 2026 concerts
| Date (2026) | City | Country | Venue | Supporting acts | Attendance | Revenue |
|---|---|---|---|---|---|---|
| April 20 | Mexico City | Mexico | Estadio GNP Seguros | Anitta | — | — |
| April 21 | Mexico City | Mexico | Estadio GNP Seguros | Anitta | — | — |
| April 22 | Mexico City | Mexico | Estadio GNP Seguros | Anitta | — | — |
| April 26 | Rio de Janeiro | Brazil | Estádio Nilton Santos | Anitta | — | — |
| April 30 | São Paulo | Brazil | Estádio MorumBIS | Anitta | — | — |
| May 1 | São Paulo | Brazil | Estádio MorumBIS | Anitta | — | — |
| June 11 | Manchester | England | Etihad Stadium | Playboi Carti; Prince 85 | — | — |
| June 12 | Manchester | England | Etihad Stadium | Playboi Carti; Prince 85 | — | — |
| June 19 | Copenhagen | Denmark | Parken Stadium | Playboi Carti | — | — |
| June 20 | Copenhagen | Denmark | Parken Stadium | Playboi Carti | — | — |
| June 25 | Munich | Germany | Allianz Arena | Playboi Carti | — | — |
| June 26 | Munich | Germany | Allianz Arena | Playboi Carti | — | — |
| June 27 | Munich | Germany | Allianz Arena | Playboi Carti | — | — |
| July 3 | Lille | France | Stade Pierre-Mauroy | Playboi Carti | — | — |
| July 4 | Lille | France | Stade Pierre-Mauroy | Playboi Carti | — | — |
| July 8 | Saint-Denis | France | Stade de France | Playboi Carti | — | — |
| July 10 | Saint-Denis | France | Stade de France | Playboi Carti | — | — |
| July 11 | Saint-Denis | France | Stade de France | Playboi Carti | — | — |
| July 12 | Saint-Denis | France | Stade de France | Playboi Carti | — | — |
| July 16 | Amsterdam | Netherlands | Johan Cruyff Arena | Playboi Carti; Prince 85 | — | — |
| July 17 | Amsterdam | Netherlands | Johan Cruyff Arena | Playboi Carti; Prince 85 | — | — |
| July 18 | Amsterdam | Netherlands | Johan Cruyff Arena | Playboi Carti; Prince 85 | — | — |
| July 21 | Nice | France | Allianz Riviera | Playboi Carti | — | — |
| July 22 | Nice | France | Allianz Riviera | Playboi Carti | — | — |
| July 24 | Milan | Italy | San Siro | Playboi Carti | — | — |
| July 25 | Milan | Italy | San Siro | Playboi Carti | — | — |
| July 26 | Milan | Italy | San Siro | Playboi Carti | — | — |
| July 30 | Frankfurt | Germany | Deutsche Bank Park | Playboi Carti | — | — |
| July 31 | Frankfurt | Germany | Deutsche Bank Park | Playboi Carti | — | — |
| August 1 | Frankfurt | Germany | Deutsche Bank Park | Playboi Carti | — | — |
| August 4 | Warsaw | Poland | PGE Narodowy | Playboi Carti | — | — |
| August 5 | Warsaw | Poland | PGE Narodowy | Playboi Carti | — | — |
| August 8 | Stockholm | Sweden | Strawberry Arena | Playboi Carti | — | — |
| August 9 | Stockholm | Sweden | Strawberry Arena | Playboi Carti | — | — |
| August 10 | Stockholm | Sweden | Strawberry Arena | Playboi Carti | — | — |
| August 14 | London | England | Wembley Stadium | Playboi Carti | — | — |
| August 15 | London | England | Wembley Stadium | Playboi Carti | — | — |
| August 16 | London | England | Wembley Stadium | Playboi Carti | — | — |
| August 18 | London | England | Wembley Stadium | Playboi Carti | — | — |
| August 19 | London | England | Wembley Stadium | Playboi Carti | — | — |
| August 22 | Dublin | Ireland | Croke Park | Playboi Carti | — | — |
| August 23 | Dublin | Ireland | Croke Park | Playboi Carti | — | — |
| August 28 | Madrid | Spain | Riyadh Air Metropolitano | Playboi Carti | — | — |
| August 29 | Madrid | Spain | Riyadh Air Metropolitano | Playboi Carti | — | — |
| August 30 | Madrid | Spain | Riyadh Air Metropolitano | Playboi Carti | — | — |
| September 1 | Barcelona | Spain | Estadi Olímpic Lluis Companys | Playboi Carti | — | — |
| September 5 | Lisbon | Portugal | Estádio do Restelo | Playboi Carti | — | — |
| September 6 | Lisbon | Portugal | Estádio do Restelo | Playboi Carti | — | — |
| September 19 | Tokorozawa (Note: Labelled as Tokyo in promotional material.) | Japan | Belluna Dome | Creepy Nuts | — | – |
| September 20 | Tokorozawa | Japan | Belluna Dome | Creepy Nuts; Yousuke Yukimatsu | — | – |
| September 26 | Jakarta | Indonesia | Jakarta International Stadium | Yousuke Yukimatsu | — | — |
| September 27 | Jakarta | Indonesia | Jakarta International Stadium | Yousuke Yukimatsu | — | — |
| October 2 | Singapore | | National Stadium | Creepy Nuts | — | — |
| October 3 | Singapore | | National Stadium | Creepy Nuts | — | — |
| October 7 | Goyang (Note: Labelled as Seoul in promotional material.) | South Korea | Goyang Stadium | Creepy Nuts | — | — |
| October 8 | Goyang | South Korea | Goyang Stadium | Creepy Nuts | — | — |
| October 11 | Bangkok | Thailand | Rajamangala Stadium | Creepy Nuts | — | — |
| October 12 | Bangkok | Thailand | Rajamangala Stadium | Creepy Nuts | — | — |
| October 13 | Bangkok | Thailand | Rajamangala Stadium | Creepy Nuts | — | — |
| October 24 | Hong Kong | | Kai Tak Stadium | —N/a | — | — |
| October 25 | Hong Kong | | Kai Tak Stadium | —N/a | — | — |
| October 30 | Hong Kong | | Kai Tak Stadium | —N/a | — | — |
| October 31 | Hong Kong | | Kai Tak Stadium | —N/a | — | — |
| November 4 | Kuala Lumpur | Malaysia | TM Stadium National | Creepy Nuts; Yousuke Yukimatsu | — | — |
| November 5 | Kuala Lumpur | Malaysia | TM Stadium National | Creepy Nuts; Yousuke Yukimatsu | — | — |
| Total | | | | | 5,487,713 / 5,526,561 (99%) | $693,269,933 |

=== Cancelled concerts ===
List of cancelled concerts
| Date | City | Country | Venue | Reason | Ref. |
|---|---|---|---|---|---|
| November 20, 2023 | Brisbane | Australia | Suncorp Stadium | Unforeseen circumstances | |
| November 21, 2023 | Brisbane | Australia | Suncorp Stadium | Unforeseen circumstances | |
| November 24, 2023 | Sydney | Australia | Accor Stadium | Unforeseen circumstances | |
| November 25, 2023 | Sydney | Australia | Accor Stadium | Unforeseen circumstances | |
| November 27, 2023 | Sydney | Australia | Accor Stadium | Unforeseen circumstances | |
| December 1, 2023 | Melbourne | Australia | Marvel Stadium | Unforeseen circumstances | |
| December 2, 2023 | Melbourne | Australia | Marvel Stadium | Unforeseen circumstances | |
| December 4, 2023 | Melbourne | Australia | Marvel Stadium | Unforeseen circumstances | |
| December 5, 2023 | Melbourne | Australia | Marvel Stadium | Unforeseen circumstances | |
| December 8, 2023 | Auckland | New Zealand | Eden Park | Unforeseen circumstances | |
| December 9, 2023 | Auckland | New Zealand | Eden Park | Unforeseen circumstances | |
| July 4, 2025 | Paradise | United States | Allegiant Stadium | Production load-in issues | |

== See also ==
- List of highest-grossing concert tours
- List of most-attended concert tours
