= Snowchild =

2020 song by the Weeknd

Song by the Weeknd

from the album After Hours
- Released: March 20, 2020
- Genre: R&B
- Length: 4:07
- Label: XO; Republic
- Songwriters: Abel Tesfaye; Jason Quenneville; Carlo Montagnese; Ahmad Balshe
- Producers: Illangelo; The Weeknd; DaHeala

Music video
- "Snowchild" on YouTube

"Snowchild" is a song by the Canadian singer-songwriter the Weeknd from his fourth studio album After Hours. It was released on March 20, 2020, alongside the rest of its parent album. A music video for the song was released on July 22, 2020. The song was written and produced by The Weeknd, Illangelo, and DaHeala; with Belly receiving additional writing credits.

== Music video ==
The official music video for "Snowchild" was first announced by the Weeknd, through his various social media platforms, shortly before its release on July 22, 2020. The animated music video was directed by D'Art Shtajio studio and is set after the events of the "Until I Bleed Out" music video. It was described by journalists as "A Dark Trip Down Memory Lane", as it showcases Tesfaye's different looks and the general atmosphere of his music throughout the six main stages of his career.

The visual begins with a red-suited Tesfaye waking up in the desert, that he's in, during the aforementioned "Until I Bleed Out" music video. He is then shown walking in a snowy Toronto and then in a neon-filled Japan, where he's then dragged down into Hollywood, where he is confronted by the mysterious man from the Beauty Behind the Madness music videos. After this, Tesfaye then arrives at and goes into the mansion from the "Starboy" music video, where he then gets into a fight with two women who turn into black panthers. Shortly, after the fight, he is then teleported into an industrial sector where he turns into his supernatural character from the "Call Out My Name" music video. After burning money at a fire barrel, he then transforms into a colony of bats and then ends up back in the desert, as the character he portrays in the After Hours music videos. He then walks towards a distant city which appears to be Toronto but then as soon as he approaches it, ends up being Las Vegas. With a somber look on his face, he then goes into the city and sees himself beginning the events of the "Heartless" visual, with the video then ending and Tesfaye being stuck in a state of purgatory.

The whole music video was done in the Japanese animation style of anime. It is the second animated music video released in support of After Hours, following the visual for the remix of "In Your Eyes".

== Commercial performance ==
Following the release of its parent album, "Snowchild" debuted at number 32 on the US Billboard Hot 100 dated April 4, 2020. It was the ninth-highest charting track from After Hours.

== Personnel ==
Credits adapted from Tidal.

- The Weeknd – vocals, songwriting, production, keyboards, programming
- Illangelo – songwriting, production, keyboards, programming
- DaHeala – songwriting, production, keyboards, programming
- Belly – songwriting

== Charts ==
Chart (2020)	Peak position
Canada Hot 100 (Billboard)	32
Czech Republic Singles Digital (ČNS IFPI)	80
France (SNEP)	80
Greece (IFPI)	52
Italy (FIMI)	91
Lithuania (AGATA)	41
Portugal (AFP)	50
Slovakia Singles Digital (ČNS IFPI)	34
Sweden (Sverigetopplistan)	72
UK Audio Streaming (Official Charts)	44
US Billboard Hot 100	32
US Hot R&B/Hip-Hop Songs (Billboard)	16
US Rolling Stone Top 100	11

== Certifications ==
Certifications for "Snowchild"
Region	Certification	Certified units/sales
Australia (ARIA)	Gold	35,000^{‡}
Brazil (Pro-Música Brasil)	Gold	20,000^{‡}
Canada (Music Canada)	Platinum	80,000^{‡}
^{‡} Sales+streaming figures based on certification alone.

== Release history ==
Region	Date	Format	Label(s)	Ref.
Various	March 20, 2020	Digital download; streaming	XO; Republic	
