= Escape from LA (song) =

Song by the Weeknd

from the album After Hours
- Released: March 20, 2020
- Studio: Noble Street (Toronto, Ontario)
- Genre: R&B
- Length: 5:56
- Label: XO; Republic
- Songwriters: Abel Tesfaye; Carlo Montagnese; Leland Tyler Wayne; Mike McTaggart
- Producers: Metro Boomin; The Weeknd; Illangelo

Audio video
- "Escape from LA" on YouTube

"Escape from LA" is a song by the Canadian singer-songwriter the Weeknd from his fourth studio album After Hours. It was released on March 20, 2020, alongside the rest of its parent album as the sixth track. The song was written by the Weeknd, Illangelo, Metro Boomin, and guitarist Mike McTaggart, while being produced by the former three.

== Critical reception ==
Billboard ranked "Escape from LA" as the worst song from the After Hours album, calling its production "sluggish", and that its descriptive bridge "doesn't do much to heighten the track's lethargy". In a review of the track, HotNewHipHop called "Escape from LA" a "sexually-charged ballad", calling its lyrics borne of "sun-soaked hangovers" and "passionate break-up sex", and further citing how fans had already called the track a highlight of After Hours.

== Cancelled music video ==
In an interview with Rolling Stone, it was mentioned that there were treatments for at least three more music videos, (which were "Too Late", "Escape From LA" and "Faith"), however it was "unclear when Tesfaye would be able to film them". However, only the music video for "Too Late" ended up being filmed, with the status of the videos for "Escape from LA" and "Faith" unknown.

== Personnel ==
- The Weeknd – vocals, songwriting, production, keyboards, programming
- Illangelo – songwriting, keyboards, programming, engineering, mixing
- Metro Boomin – songwriting, keyboards, programming
- Mike McTaggart – songwriting, guitar
- Shin Kamiyama – engineering
- Dave Kutch – mastering
- Kevin Peterson – mastering

== Charts ==
Chart (2020)	Peak position
Canada Hot 100 (Billboard)	44
Estonia (Eesti Tipp-40)	40
France (SNEP)	88
Greece (IFPI)	48
Italy (FIMI)	88
Lithuania (AGATA)	40
Portugal (AFP)	49
Sweden (Sverigetopplistan)	90
UK Audio Streaming (Official Charts)	50
US Billboard Hot 100	39
US Hot R&B/Hip-Hop Songs (Billboard)	21
US Rolling Stone Top 100	15

== Certifications ==
Region	Certification	Certified units/sales
Australia (ARIA)	Gold	35,000^{‡}
Brazil (Pro-Música Brasil)	Gold	20,000^{‡}
Canada (Music Canada)	Platinum	80,000^{‡}
^{‡} Sales+streaming figures based on certification alone.

== Release history ==
Region	Date	Format	Label(s)	Ref.
Various	March 20, 2020	Digital download; streaming	XO; Republic	
