= Too Late (The Weeknd song) =

2020 song by the Weeknd

Song by the Weeknd

from the album After Hours
- Released: March 20, 2020
- Genre: Electro; R&B
- Length: 4:00
- Label: XO; Republic
- Songwriters: Abel Tesfaye; Jason Quenneville; Carlo Montagnese; Eric Burton Frederic
- Producers: Illangelo; Ricky Reed; The Weeknd; DaHeala; Nate Mercereau

Music video
- "Too Late" on YouTube

"Too Late" is a song by the Canadian singer-songwriter the Weeknd from his fourth studio album After Hours (2020). It was released on March 20, 2020, alongside the rest of its parent album. A music video for the song was released on October 22, 2020. The Weeknd co-wrote the song with its producers, Illangelo, DaHeala, and Ricky Reed, with additional production credits going to Nate Mercereau.

== Background and release ==
The song was first teased in the Weeknd's After Hours short film, which was released on March 4, 2020, during a scene in which Tesfaye adjusts his nose bandage after leaving the Jimmy Kimmel Live! studio. The studio version of the song was then released on March 20, 2020, alongside the rest of the album.

== Lyrics ==
The lyrics of the song depict a dysfunctional and hedonistic relationship the Weeknd had with a former lover, with him apologizing for the mistakes he's made throughout their romance.

== Critical reception ==
"Too Late" received praise upon release, with Billboard ranking the song as the second best track from After Hours, calling its chords "halloween-esque" and saying that its electro-R&B beats "bring the Weeknd' apologetic musings to another level, as he sings the lines "I let you down/I led you on," and further referred to its abrupt end as a "literal unplugging," calling it an "electric" combination.

== Music video ==
Through his Rolling Stone interview with Brittany Spanos on September 18, 2020, it was revealed that the Weeknd had treatments to make music videos for three After Hours songs, "Too Late", "Escape from LA", and "Faith". Later on October 13, he hinted on the music video for "Too Late" being on its way through several posts on his social media platforms. The Weeknd officially announced its release date of October 22, 2020 a day prior to its release. The visual was directed by Cliqua, and features models Ashley Smith and Kenzie Harr. It serves as the sequel to the music video of "In Your Eyes" and features Smith and Harr as heavily bandaged models finding the severed head of the Weeknd, and transplanting it onto the body of singer Ken XY in a gory and murderous manner.

The video begins with an NSFW warning due to its "explicit content" and its depiction of "graphic violence" as well as being age-restricted on YouTube based on the apps' community guidelines. It was named one of the best music videos of 2020 by Pitchfork.

== Commercial performance ==
Following the releasing of its parent album, "Too Late" debuted at number 28 on the US Billboard Hot 100 dated April 4, 2020. It was the eighth-highest charting track from After Hours.

== Personnel ==
Credits adapted from Tidal.

- The Weeknd – vocals, songwriting, production, keyboards, programming
- Illangelo – songwriting, production, keyboards, programming
- DaHeala – songwriting, production, keyboards, programming
- Ricky Reed – songwriting, production, keyboards, programming

== Charts ==
Chart (2020)	Peak position
Canada Hot 100 (Billboard)	38
Czech Republic Singles Digital (ČNS IFPI)	49
Denmark (Tracklisten)	33
Estonia (Eesti Tipp-40)	28
France (SNEP)	59
Greece International (IFPI)	23
Iceland (Tónlistinn)	28
Italy (FIMI)	48
Lithuania (AGATA)	26
Portugal (AFP)	27
Slovakia Singles Digital (ČNS IFPI)	19
Sweden (Sverigetopplistan)	54
UK Audio Streaming (Official Charts)	39
US Billboard Hot 100	28
US Hot R&B/Hip-Hop Songs (Billboard)	13
US Rolling Stone Top 100	8

== Certifications ==
Region	Certification	Certified units/sales
Australia (ARIA)	Gold	35,000^{‡}
Brazil (Pro-Música Brasil)	Gold	20,000^{‡}
Canada (Music Canada)	Platinum	80,000^{‡}
^{‡} Sales+streaming figures based on certification alone.

== Release history ==
Region	Date	Format	Label(s)	Ref.
Various	March 20, 2020	Digital download; streaming	XO; Republic	
