= Scared to Live =

2020 song by the Weeknd

Song by the Weeknd

from the album After Hours
- Released: March 20, 2020
- Studio: Conway, MXM (Los Angeles, California); Jungle City (New York, New York); House Mouse Studios, MXM (Stockholm, Sweden)
- Genre: Synth-pop; adult contemporary
- Length: 3:11
- Label: XO; Republic
- Songwriters: Abel Tesfaye; Ahmad Balshe; Max Martin; Oscar Holter; Daniel Lopatin; Elton John; Bernard Taupin
- Producers: Max Martin; Oscar Holter; The Weeknd

"Scared to Live" is a song by the Canadian singer-songwriter the Weeknd from his fourth studio album After Hours. He performed the song for the first time on March 8, 2020, with American musician Oneohtrix Point Never, during an episode of Saturday Night Live. The SNL version of the song was officially released alongside the deluxe edition of its parent album on March 23, 2020. The Weeknd wrote and produced the song with Max Martin and Oscar Holter, writing credits also going to Belly and Oneohtrix Point Never. Elton John and Bernard Taupin received additional songwriting credits for the interpolation of John's 1970 single "Your Song".

== Background and promotion ==
In early February 2020, SNL confirmed that it was going to have the Weeknd as a musical guest on March 7, 2020. During the episode, the Weeknd performed the comedic skit "On the Couch" with Kenan Thompson and Chris Redd, and two songs from his album After Hours: the single "Blinding Lights" and the previously unreleased "Scared to Live" with Oneohtrix Point Never. The studio version of the song was then released on March 20, 2020, alongside the rest of the album.

Elton John shared in an interview with New Zealand radio presenter Zane Lowe that he was happy with the interpolation of "Your Song" in Scared to Live, stating, "I'm so blown away, I mean, just to be part of his record, for someone my age and as someone who loves what he does, I'm so thrilled and I just love him. I just think ... I was watching a couple of things this morning that were the same old stuff, the rap stuff and I was thinking, 'Good old Abel, he's making music. He's making proper music.'"

== Lyrics and composition ==
"Scared to Live" has been described as a synth-pop ballad that maintains the strong adult contemporary sonics of John's "Your Song". Lyrically, it details the ending of a relationship the Weeknd had with a former lover that left them questioning if they could ever discover love again. The Weeknd encourages his past partner to move on from their past and find themselves, apologizing for the faults he made while still yearning for the connection that they once had.

== Critical reception ==
The song received universal critical acclaim and was considered a highlight from its parent album, with the ballad's minimalistic nature, sincere lyrics, and the Weeknd's vocals receiving particular praise. Journalists also commended the maturity in the song's lyrics, while noting its sound as being reminiscent of ballads performed by Phil Collins in the past. Vibe writer Jack Riedy complimented the imagery, "The listener can practically see the disco ball spinning over a gaggle of youths at their prom's last dance as Tesfaye urges them don't be scared to live again".

Seth Wilson of Slant wrote that the song "displays the grandeur of a pop ballad, with a swooning earworm of a chorus and lyrics that tenderly reflect on a past love, and with a maturity that comes only with hindsight. The song nearly edges into schmaltz, but it's full of surprises, including a nod to Elton John's 'Your Song' that's so well integrated into the chorus it's easy to miss." Micah Peters from The Ringer called the composition "a soaring ballad in which The Weeknd expresses joy and pain where once there was crushing melancholy". NME reviewer Will Richard named the piece a "shimmering, emotive ballad". Craig Jenkins of Vulture praised the song's "glistening synths over trap drums with delightful deviations. The writing's tight and there's a cohesion of sound and vision". In an AllMusic review, Andy Kellman states that "Scared to Live" is "so clean and down the middle that it resembles a box-office crossover bid from an artiste swallowing his pride to record a tame song. It is one of Tesfaye's best performances, his voice soaring and swooping, signifying numbness and codependency, sorrowful about wasted time while encouraging emotional convalescence".

== Commercial performance ==
Following the releasing of its parent album, "Scared to Live" debuted at number 24 on the US Billboard Hot 100 dated April 4, 2020. It was the fifth highest charting track from After Hours.

== Live performances ==
The song was first performed live on SNL alongside "Blinding Lights" on March 7, 2020. The performance was introduced by Daniel Craig and featured the Weeknd wearing a bandaged, bloodied nose and red suit, as part of a persona portrayed in the art direction for the After Hours era. Oneohtrix Point Never accompanied him on the synthesizer.

== Personnel ==
Credits adapted from Genius.

- The Weeknd – songwriting, vocals, production, keyboards, programming, bass, guitar, drums
- Max Martin – songwriting, production, keyboards, programming, bass, guitar, drums
- Oscar Holter – songwriting, production, keyboards, programming, bass, guitar, drums
- Belly – songwriting
- Oneohtrix Point Never – songwriting, synthesizer programming (SNL Live)
- Elton John – songwriting
- Bernard Taupin – songwriting
- Dave Kutch – mastering
- Kevin Peterson – mastering
- Shin Kamiyama - engineering
- Sam Holland - engineering
- Michael Ilbert - engineering
- Serban Ghenea - mixing engineer
- John Hanes - mixing engineer

== Charts ==
Chart (2020)	Peak position
Canada Hot 100 (Billboard)	33
Czech Republic Singles Digital (ČNS IFPI)	47
Denmark (Tracklisten)	29
Estonia (Eesti Tipp-40)	29
France (SNEP)	56
Greece (IFPI)	44
Iceland (Tónlistinn)	26
Italy (FIMI)	64
Lithuania (AGATA)	32
New Zealand Hot Singles (RMNZ)	3
Norway (VG-lista)	33
Portugal (AFP)	37
Slovakia Singles Digital (ČNS IFPI)	23
Sweden (Sverigetopplistan)	34
UK Audio Streaming (Official Charts)	40
US Billboard Hot 100	24
US Hot R&B/Hip-Hop Songs (Billboard)	12
US Rolling Stone Top 100	9

== Certifications ==
Certifications for "Scared to Live"
Region	Certification	Certified units/sales
Australia (ARIA)	Gold	35,000^{‡}
Brazil (Pro-Música Brasil)	Gold	20,000^{‡}
Canada (Music Canada)	Platinum	80,000^{‡}
^{‡} Sales+streaming figures based on certification alone.

== Release history ==
Region	Date	Format	Label(s)	Ref.
Various	March 20, 2020	Digital download; streaming	XO; Republic	
