= Faith (The Weeknd song) =

2020 song by the Weeknd

Song by the Weeknd

from the album After Hours
- Released: March 20, 2020
- Studio: XO Studios (Hidden Hills, California)
- Genre: Synthwave
- Length: 4:43
- Label: XO; Republic
- Songwriters: Abel Tesfaye; Ahmad Balshe; Leland Wayne; Carlo Montagnese
- Producers: Metro Boomin; The Weeknd; Illangelo

"Faith" is a song by the Canadian singer-songwriter the Weeknd from his fourth studio album After Hours. The track was teased multiple times throughout the pre-release promotional material for the album, with the song's intro first being shown on February 13, 2020, through the After Hours teaser. Its second verse and outro were teased on the album's self-titled short film, which was released on March 4, 2020. The song was officially released on March 20, 2020, alongside the rest of its parent album. The Weeknd wrote and produced the song with Metro Boomin and Illangelo, with additional writing credits going to Canadian rapper Belly.

== Background and release ==
In early February 2020, the Weeknd released the album teaser for After Hours, which featured the intro to the album's eighth track "Faith". Later on March 4, the album's self-titled short film was released, and it featured the second verse and outro of the aforementioned song. The studio version of the song was then released on March 20, alongside the rest of the album.

== Lyrics and composition ==
During an After Hours listening session with Jem Aswad of Variety, the Weeknd shared the meaning behind "Faith".

So, this is really the only song on the record that isn't about right now. It's about the darkest time of my entire life, a time when I was getting really, really tossed up and going through a lot of personal stuff. This is around 2013-14: I got arrested in Vegas, it was a real rockstar era which I wasn't really proud of, and at the end of [the song] you hear sirens. That's me in the back of the cop car, that moment. I always wanted to make that song but I never did, and this album felt like the perfect time, because of the setting of Las Vegas, and [the character needing] a kind of escape after a heartbreak or whatever, "I'm gonna go to Vegas and drown all my sorrows," and by the time you get to the end of the album you realize it's more of a redemption. But I wanted to go to Vegas and be this guy again, the "Heartless" guy, the drug monster, the person who hates God and is losing his f—ing religion and hating what he looks like when he looks in the mirror so he keeps getting high, and hating to be sober because "I feel the most lonely when I'm coming down" — that's who this song is.

When composing the track, the Weeknd admitted that although he didn't want to recall that period of his life, he felt as though he had to as an act of self-realization that he's no longer the person he once was. He also noted that the goal of the track was to make the audience feel uncomfortable when listening to it. "...I really wanted to get inside the head of the person who hates himself and hates life and hates the person who made him that way."

The song makes several references to the singles "Purple Rain" by Prince, "Losing My Religion" by R.E.M., and "Sicko Mode" by Travis Scott.

== Critical reception ==
The song was noted as a being a highlight from the album by critics, with Max Cea from GQ calling it one of his masterworks in the realm of alternative R&B. Additionally, he applauds the Weeknd's writing and singing, as well as the production of the track, giving praise to the song's outro which directly leads into "Blinding Lights". Jon Dolan from Rolling Stone also gave a positive review for the song, describing it as being magisterial and giving particular praise to the Weeknd's vocals and Metro Boomin's production. The song's synthwave sound also received comparisons to the work done by Kavinsky on his debut single "Nightcall".

== Cancelled music video ==
In an interview with Rolling Stone, it was mentioned that the Weeknd had treatments lined up for three more videos, which were for "Faith", "Escape from LA" and "Too Late" but that it was unclear when he would be able to film them. Only the video for "Too Late" was released however, with the status of the videos of "Escape from LA" and "Faith" currently unknown.

== Commercial performance ==
Following the releasing of its parent album, "Faith" debuted at number 45 on the US Billboard Hot 100 dated April 4, 2020. It was the twelfth highest charting track from After Hours.

== Personnel ==
Credits adapted from Tidal.

- The Weeknd – vocals, songwriting, production, keyboards, programming
- Metro Boomin – songwriting, production, keyboards, programming
- Illangelo – songwriting, production, keyboards, programming
- Belly – songwriting
- Dave Kutch – mastering
- Kevin Peterson – mastering

== Charts ==
Chart (2020)	Peak position
Canada Hot 100 (Billboard)	43
Czech Republic Singles Digital (ČNS IFPI)	65
Estonia (Eesti Tipp-40)	34
France (SNEP)	85
Greece (IFPI)	31
Italy (FIMI)	90
Lithuania (AGATA)	36
Portugal (AFP)	56
Slovakia Singles Digital (ČNS IFPI)	26
Sweden (Sverigetopplistan)	81
UK Audio Streaming (Official Charts)	47
US Billboard Hot 100	45
US Hot R&B/Hip-Hop Songs (Billboard)	24
US Rolling Stone Top 100	17

== Certifications ==
Certifications for "Faith"
Region	Certification	Certified units/sales
Australia (ARIA)	Gold	35,000^{‡}
Brazil (Pro-Música Brasil)	Gold	20,000^{‡}
Canada (Music Canada)	Platinum	80,000^{‡}
^{‡} Sales+streaming figures based on certification alone.

== Release history ==
Region	Date	Format	Label(s)	Ref.
Various	March 20, 2020	Digital download; streaming	XO; Republic	
