= Alone Again =

Alone Again may refer to:

- Alone Again (album), by George Jones, 1976
- "Alone Again" (Alyssa Reid song), 2010
- "Alone Again" (Asking Alexandria song), 2021
- "Alone Again" (Dokken song), 1985
- "Alone Again" (The Weeknd song), 2020
- "Alone Again", a song by the Bee Gees from 2 Years On, 1970
- "Alone Again", a song by the Slackers from The Question, 1998
- "Alone Again", a song by Teenager
- "Alone Again", a song by Kylie Minogue from the White Diamond: A Personal Portrait of Kylie Minogue soundtrack

== See also ==
- Alone, Again, a 1975 album by Paul Bley
- Alone (Again), a 1977 album by Bill Evans
- Alone Again Or, a 1967 song by the band Love
- "Alone Again (Naturally)", a 1972 song by Gilbert O'Sullivan
- Alone Again (Naturally) (album), a 1972 album by Andy Williams
