= After Hours (The Weeknd song) =

2020 single by the Weeknd

Single by the Weeknd

from the album After Hours
- Released: February 19, 2020 (promotional); February 25, 2020 (radio)
- Recorded: 2019
- Studio: Conway (Los Angeles, California); Malibu Blue Studio (Malibu, CA)
- Genre: Progressive House; electro; house
- Length: 6:01
- Label: XO; Republic
- Songwriters: Abel Tesfaye; Ahmad Balshe; Carlo Montagnese; Jason Quenneville; Mario Winans
- Producers: The Weeknd; Illangelo; DaHeala; Mario Winans

The Weeknd singles chronology
"Blinding Lights" (2019)	"After Hours" (2020)	"In Your Eyes" (2020)

Audio
- "After Hours" on YouTube

"After Hours" is a song by the Canadian singer-songwriter the Weeknd, from his fourth studio album of the same name. The penultimate track, it was originally released as a promotional single from the album on February 19, 2020, before being sent to US rhythmic radio through XO and Republic Records as its third single six days later. The Weeknd wrote and produced the song with Illangelo, DaHeala, and Mario Winans, with Belly receiving additional writing credits.

== Background and release ==
On February 13, 2020, the Weeknd announced the title of the parent album of the same name as After Hours, following the release of the commercially successful singles "Heartless" and "Blinding Lights". Five days later on February 18, he announced the release date of the promotional single "After Hours" and then revealed the cover art of its parent album. Upon the release of "After Hours" on February 19, 2020, the release date of its parent album was also revealed.

As of July 2026, the audio of the song on YouTube has over 293 million views.

== Composition and lyrics ==
"After Hours" is a "dark, swirling" and "ominous" electro and house composition. According to Sheldon Pearce of Pitchfork, the track "opens with his old signature style - falsetto, echoes, and recurrent tones - until suddenly it erupts into dance production".

The lyrics of the song discuss the Weeknd's regret of ending a relationship with a former lover, and his desire for them to reconcile and to have children. The song proceeds to hear Weeknd taking responsibility for the relationship's demise, promising that if his former lover were to return to him, he would not disappoint her again.

== Critical reception ==
Critics compared its sound to the Weeknd's early Trilogy material. Fan reaction was also favorable. In a weekly round up review, the staff from the music news website BrooklynVegan, described the song as being a "four-on-the-floor banger." Shaad D'Souza of The FADER placed the song on his list of "The 20 best pop songs right now", stating "Abel Tesfaye takes a dip into Trilogy territory with this dank and depressive sex fantasy. I love it!"

== Commercial performance ==
"After Hours" entered the Billboard Hot 100 at number 77 on the issue dated February 29, 2020, after two days of tracking. The following week it climbed 57 spots up to number 20 on the chart.

On the Rolling Stone Top 100 Songs chart, the song debuted at number 43 on the week ending on February 20, 2020. It later rose to number five on the chart, the following week, on the tracking period ending on February 27, 2020.

In the singer's native country of Canada, "After Hours" reached number 14 on the Canadian Hot 100. In the United Kingdom, the song reached number 20, becoming the Weeknd's 19th top 40 hit in the nation.

== Personnel ==
Credits adapted from Tidal.

- The Weeknd – vocals, songwriting, production, keyboards, programming
- Belly – songwriting
- DaHeala – songwriting, production, keyboards, programming
- Illangelo – songwriting, production, keyboards, programming, engineering, mixing
- Mario Winans – songwriting, production
- Shin Kamiyama – engineering
- Dave Kutch – mastering
- Kevin Peterson – mastering

== Charts ==
Chart (2020)	Peak position
Australia (ARIA)	11
Austria (Ö3 Austria Top 40)	33
Belgium (Ultratop 50 Flanders)	43
Belgium (Ultratip Bubbling Under Wallonia)	20
Canada Hot 100 (Billboard)	14
Czech Republic Singles Digital (ČNS IFPI)	9
Denmark (Tracklisten)	17
Estonia (Eesti Tipp-40)	4
Finland (Suomen virallinen lista)	11
France (SNEP)	44
Germany (GfK)	35
Greece International (IFPI)	5
Iceland (Tónlistinn)	14
Ireland (IRMA)	14
Italy (FIMI)	36
Lithuania (AGATA)	5
Malaysia (RIM)	11
Mexico Airplay (Billboard)	31
Netherlands (Single Top 100)	27
New Zealand (Recorded Music NZ)	29
Norway (VG-lista)	14
Portugal (AFP)	18
Scottish Singles Sales (Official Charts)	87
Singapore (RIAS)	17
Slovakia Singles Digital (ČNS IFPI)	6
Spain (PROMUSICAE)	84
Sweden (Sverigetopplistan)	10
Switzerland (Schweizer Hitparade)	16
UK Singles (Official Charts)	20
UK Hip Hop/R&B (Official Charts)	9
US Billboard Hot 100	20
US Hot R&B/Hip-Hop Songs (Billboard)	10
US Rhythmic Airplay (Billboard)	34
US Rolling Stone Top 100	5

Chart (2026)	Peak position
Singapore (RIAS)	15

== Certifications ==
Region	Certification	Certified units/sales
Australia (ARIA)	2× Platinum	140,000^{‡}
Brazil (Pro-Música Brasil)	2× Platinum	80,000^{‡}
Denmark (IFPI Danmark)	Platinum	90,000^{‡}
France (SNEP)	Platinum	200,000^{‡}
Italy (FIMI)	Platinum	100,000^{‡}
New Zealand (RMNZ)	Platinum	30,000^{‡}
Norway (IFPI Norway)	Gold	30,000^{‡}
Poland (ZPAV)	Platinum	50,000^{‡}
Portugal (AFP)	Platinum	10,000^{‡}
Spain (Promusicae)	Gold	30,000^{‡}
United Kingdom (BPI)	Platinum	600,000^{‡}
United States (RIAA)	Platinum	1,000,000^{‡}
Streaming
Greece (IFPI Greece)	3× Platinum	6,000,000^{†}
^{‡} Sales+streaming figures based on certification alone.^{†} Streaming-only figures based on certification alone.

== Release history ==
Region	Date	Format	Label(s)	Ref.
Various	February 19, 2020	Digital download; streaming	XO; Republic	
United States	February 25, 2020	Rhythmic radio	XO; Republic	
