= Nothing Compares =

Nothing Compares may refer to:

- Nothing Compares 2 U, 1985 song written and composed by Prince, 1990 version by Sinéad O'Connor
- Nothing Compares (film), 2022 documentary film
- "Nothing Compares" (song), song by the Weeknd
- "Nothing Compares" (Third Day song)
