= Alone Again (The Weeknd song) =

Song by the Weeknd

from the album After Hours
- Released: March 20, 2020
- Recorded: 2019
- Studio: Henson (Los Angeles, California); XO Studios (Hidden Hills, California)
- Genre: Synth-pop; trap
- Length: 4:10
- Label: XO; Republic
- Songwriters: Abel Tesfaye; Jason Quenneville; Carlo Montagnese; Adam Feeney
- Producers: Illangelo; The Weeknd; DaHeala; Frank Dukes

Audio video
- "Alone Again" on YouTube

"Alone Again" is a song by the Canadian singer-songwriter the Weeknd, from his fourth studio album, After Hours. It was released on March 20, 2020, alongside the rest of the album and serves as the opening track. The Weeknd wrote and produced the song with DaHeala, Illangelo and Frank Dukes.

== Critical reception ==
Billboard ranked "Alone Again" as the ninth best song from After Hours, citing its "smooth production assists," calling its instrumentation Daft Punk-esque, which gives way to a "toe-tap inducing trap bass."

== Live performances ==
As part of three official Vevo live performances, Tesfaye performed "Alone Again" live for the first time on November 23, 2020. The performance shows Tesfaye in the red suit used for its parent album's promotional material, and him performing the track in what Billboard describes as "a pristine white room with one flashing red wall as a backdrop". The song would later serve as the intro for the first leg of the Weeknd's After Hours til Dawn Tour.

== Charts ==
Chart (2020)	Peak position
Canada Hot 100 (Billboard)	28
Estonia (Eesti Tipp-40)	30
France (SNEP)	49
Greece (IFPI)	22
Iceland (Tónlistinn)	19
Italy (FIMI)	46
Lithuania (AGATA)	33
Portugal (AFP)	24
Sweden (Sverigetopplistan)	51
UK Audio Streaming (Official Charts)	35
US Billboard Hot 100	21
US Hot R&B/Hip-Hop Songs (Billboard)	10
US Rolling Stone Top 100	6

== Certifications ==
Certifications for "Alone Again"
Region	Certification	Certified units/sales
Australia (ARIA)	Gold	35,000^{‡}
^{‡} Sales+streaming figures based on certification alone.

== Personnel ==
- The Weeknd – vocals, keyboards, programming
- Illangelo – keyboards, programming, engineering, mixing
- Shin Kamiyama – engineering
- DaHeala – keyboards, programming
- Frank Dukes – keyboards, programming
- Dave Kutch – mastering
- Kevin Peterson – mastering

== Release history ==
Region	Date	Format	Label(s)	Ref.
Various	March 20, 2020	Digital download; streaming	XO; Republic	
