= After Hours (The Weeknd album) =

Studio album by the Weeknd
- Released: March 20, 2020
- Recorded: 2018–2020
- Studios: Conway (Los Angeles); Elysian Park (Los Angeles); Henson (Los Angeles); Republic (Los Angeles); House Mouse (Stockholm); Jungle City (New York City); Malibu Blue (Malibu); MXM (Los Angeles and Stockholm); Noble Street (Toronto); XO (Hidden Hills)
- Genres: Synth-pop; electropop; new wave; synthwave; R&B; dream pop
- Length: 56:19
- Labels: XO; Republic
- Producers: DaHeala; Illangelo; Kevin Parker; Max Martin; Metro Boomin; Notinbed; OPN; Oscar Holter; Prince 85; Ricky Reed; The Weeknd

The Weeknd chronology
The Weeknd in Japan (2018)	After Hours (2020)	The Highlights (2021)

Singles from After Hours
- 1. "Heartless" Released: November 27, 2019; 2. "Blinding Lights" Released: November 29, 2019; 3. "After Hours" Released: February 25, 2020; 4. "In Your Eyes" Released: March 24, 2020; 5. "Save Your Tears" Released: August 9, 2020

After Hours is the fourth studio album by the Canadian singer-songwriter the Weeknd. It was released on March 20, 2020, by XO and Republic Records. The standard edition of the album contains no guest appearances, but the deluxe edition features Ariana Grande and the remixes edition features Chromatics and Lil Uzi Vert. Production was primarily handled by the Weeknd alongside a variety of producers, including DaHeala, Illangelo, Max Martin, Metro Boomin, and OPN, most of whom the Weeknd had worked with previously.

Prior to the album's release, the Weeknd confirmed that After Hours would contrast stylistically with its predecessor, Starboy (2016); some music journalists have noted the album reflects an artistic reinvention for the Weeknd, with the introduction of new wave and dream pop influences. The album's title is borrowed from the 1985 film of the same name, while its artwork and aesthetic was inspired by various other films. Thematically, After Hours explores loneliness, self-loathing, and escapism. It is also the first installment in a trilogy of albums, preceding Dawn FM (2022) and Hurry Up Tomorrow (2025).

After Hours was supported by five singles: "Heartless", "Blinding Lights", the title track, "In Your Eyes", and "Save Your Tears". The former two reached number one on the Billboard Hot 100, with the latter's remix with Grande also topping the chart. The album opened with first-week sales of 444,000 album-equivalent units in the U.S. and debuted at number one on the Billboard 200, marking the Weeknd's fourth U.S. number-one album. Internationally, it peaked at number one in 20 countries, including Canada and the United Kingdom. The album received generally positive reviews from critics, with praise for its production and cohesion; some critics named it the Weeknd's best work.

== Background and release ==
The Weeknd first teased that he was working on a new album during a performance in November 2018, telling the crowd that "Chapter VI was coming soon". He continued to tease the project on January 12, 2019, by tweeting "no more daytime music". His post made fans and media outlets believe that he would continue the darker sounds that were present in his first EP My Dear Melancholy (2018). The Weeknd further teased the album on August 6 of that year by tweeting "album mode full effect".

After a five-month period of silence, the Weeknd revealed a snippet of the album's second single "Blinding Lights" through a Mercedes-Benz commercial. The next day, he teased the album's lead single "Heartless", which was released on November 27, 2019; "Blinding Lights" was released two days later. In the hours leading up to the release of "Heartless", the Weeknd took to social media to tease the album's era, posting "the fall starts tomorrow night" and "Tonight we start a new brain melting psychotic chapter! Let's go!"

On February 13, 2020, the Weeknd revealed the album's title through a short teaser. On February 19, he revealed the album's artwork and release date, and released its title track as a promotional single. On March 17, the Weeknd unveiled After Hours' tracklist. Hours before the album was released, the Weeknd announced that After Hours was dedicated to longtime fan Lance, the host of the XO Podcast who died the night before. On its release day, the album premiered on the eighth episode of the Weeknd's Apple Music 1 radio show Memento Mori. At the same time, the Weeknd hosted a listening session on Spotify. A deluxe edition of the album, containing five remixes, was surprise released on March 23, 2020. An updated deluxe edition, containing three additional tracks, was released on March 30. A remix EP, featuring the deluxe edition's remixes and an additional remix, was released on April 3.

== Composition ==
Musically, After Hours has been described as synth-pop, electropop, new wave, synthwave, R&B, and dream pop. The album also contains elements of electro, electro house, trap, drum and bass, liquid funk, and synth-rock. Lyrically, After Hours explores themes of heartbreak, escapism, loneliness, promiscuity, overindulgence, self-loathing and regret.

When asked about the reason behind the album's title, the Weeknd explained to Variety: "Oh, there are so many reasons for it. The main reason is these are all emotions and thoughts and feelings that I had late at night – [like the video] is all one night and I'm going through all the emotions, after the club, after the fight and after a long day, it's like these are my thoughts from 3 a.m. to 5 a.m."

== Artwork and aesthetic ==
The artwork and aesthetic for the album's promotional material has been described as psychedelic and being inspired by various films, such as: Fear and Loathing in Las Vegas (1998), Joker (2019), Casino (1995), and Uncut Gems (2019), with the last film having a cameo appearance by the Weeknd himself. The title of the album was inspired by the 1985 movie of the same name by Martin Scorsese. The Weeknd's physical appearance in the era has been described by journalists as being red-pigmented, with him consistently maintaining a red suit and specific hairstyle throughout all of the album's promotional material, such as its artwork, music videos, teasers, and live performances, with its music videos and live performances used to create a mini story. The album's overall art direction was primarily handled by the Tammi brothers, with its design being handled by Aleksi Tammi. The album's creative direction was handled by the Weeknd's creative director and childhood friend La Mar Taylor.

== Promotion ==
=== Singles ===
On November 27, 2019, the album's lead single, "Heartless", was released digitally on music stores and streaming services. The song was noticeably produced by American record producer Metro Boomin. At the time of its release, it was the Weeknd's first solo single since 2018's "Call Out My Name" from the EP My Dear Melancholy (2018). The single peaked at number one on the US Billboard Hot 100 and became the Weeknd's fourth song to top the chart, with it also becoming Metro Boomin's second chart topper that he produced. Its music video was released on December 3, 2019.

"Blinding Lights" was released digitally on music stores and streaming services on November 29, 2019, as the album's second single. The song peaked at number one in 22 countries, including the United States and Canada, where it became the Weeknd's fifth number-one single on the Billboard Hot 100 and the Canadian Hot 100 for four and seven weeks respectively. It also became his first number-one single in Germany for ten weeks, United Kingdom for eight weeks, and Australia for eleven weeks, thus making it his biggest hit single to date. Its music video was released on January 21, 2020. It would later become the Billboard No. 1 Song of All Time in 2021.

The album's title track was released as a promotional single on February 19, 2020. The song was later sent to US rhythmic radio on February 25, 2020, as the album's third single.

"In Your Eyes" was released to rhythmic contemporary radio on March 24, 2020, as the album's third single. The song peaked at number 16 on the Billboard Hot 100. Its music video was released on March 23, 2020.

"Save Your Tears" was released to contemporary hit radio in Europe as the album's fourth single on August 9, 2020. It was later released to US rhythmic contemporary radio on November 24, 2020. Following the remix with Ariana Grande, the song peaked at number one on the Billboard Hot 100. The music video for the song was released on January 5, 2021.

=== Performances ===
On December 5, 2019, the Weeknd performed "Heartless" for the first time on The Late Show with Stephen Colbert with "Blinding Lights" receiving its debut performance the following day on the same show. Both performances received positive reactions from critics and audiences, and were compared to those done by Michael Jackson and Prince in the past. On January 22, 2020, the Weeknd performed "Blinding Lights" on Jimmy Kimmel Live!. His appearance during the performance on the show was inspired by the events that occurred within the aforementioned single's music video, which was released shortly before his live performance. For his performance on the March 7, 2020, episode of Saturday Night Live, He performed a comedic track alongside Kenan Thompson and Chris Redd, made specifically for the show, titled "On the Couch", and the songs: "Blinding Lights" and the previously unreleased "Scared to Live", the latter of which featured electronic musician Oneohtrix Point Never and interpolates "Your Song" by Elton John.

Throughout 2020, various other performances of the album's songs occurred during major televised events like the 2020 MTV Video Music Awards, the 2020 Time 100 primetime event, the American Music Awards of 2020.

=== Teaser and short film ===
On February 13, 2020, the Weeknd released a 48-second teaser that announced the album's title. Journalists noted its resemblance to the digital work done in the 2019 film Uncut Gems, which he had a cameo in.

A self titled short film for the album was first teased on March 3, 2020, with its release occurring on March 4, 2020. It was directed by Anton Tammi and continued the storyline and aesthetics found in the visuals for "Heartless" and "Blinding Lights". The film is set shortly after the Weeknd's performance of "Blinding Lights" on Jimmy Kimmel Live! (dated January 22, 2020) and features various snippets of the tracks from the album as he navigates a subway. It concludes with the Weeknd seemingly murdering a couple in a secluded elevator. The visual was noted by journalists as being inspired by the films Joker and The Shining. In an interview to Variety in 2020, the Weeknd said that films such as Chinatown, Jacobs Ladder, King of Comedy, Trouble Every Day, Possession, Dressed to Kill and After Hours are referred in the short film.

=== Promotional singles and other songs ===
On February 18, 2020, the Weeknd announced the release of the album's title track with the reveal of the album's cover art. The promotional single reached the top 20 of various countries worldwide, including the United States, where it peaked at number 20 on the Billboard Hot 100.

On April 7, 2020, a music video for the album's closing track "Until I Bleed Out" was released. On July 22, 2020, a music video for the album's fifth track "Snowchild" was released. On October 22, 2020, a music video for the album's second track "Too Late" was released.

=== Tour ===
On February 20, 2020, the Weeknd announced the After Hours Tour, set to span North America and Europe. The tour would have originally lasted throughout the latter half of 2020, beginning on June 11 and ending on November 12. The tour was later postponed to 2021, then to 2022, due to the COVID-19 pandemic. Sabrina Claudio, Don Toliver and Black Atlass were set to open the tour.

On October 18, 2021, the Weeknd announced that due to arena constraints, the start of tour would be pushed back to the summer of 2022 and would now be held entirely in stadiums. He also announced that the tour would now be called the After Hours til Dawn Stadium Tour, as it also supports his fifth studio album Dawn FM (2022). In 2025, the tour additionally supported his sixth studio album Hurry Up Tomorrow, which was released that year.

=== Super Bowl LV halftime show ===
On November 12, 2020, the Weeknd announced that he would be performing during the Super Bowl LV halftime show. The event took place on February 7, 2021. Dave Meyers executive produced the show, while Roc Nation produced and creatively directed. Hamish Hamilton, the event's annual director since 2010, returned to direct the performance.

== Critical reception ==
After Hours ratings
Aggregate scores
Source	Rating
AnyDecentMusic?	7.7/10
Metacritic	80/100
Review scores
Source	Rating
AllMusic	4/5 stars
Consequence	A−
Evening Standard	3/5 stars
Exclaim!	8/10
The Guardian	4/5 stars
The Independent	4/5 stars
NME	4/5 stars
Pitchfork	7.9/10
PopMatters	8/10
Rolling Stone	3.5/5 stars

After Hours was met with generally positive reviews from contemporary critics. At Metacritic, which assigns a normalized rating out of 100 to reviews from professional publications, the album received an average score of 80, based on 20 reviews, indicating "generally favorable reviews". Aggregator AnyDecentMusic? gave it 7.7 out of 10, based on their assessment of the critical consensus.

In a rave review, The New York Times journalist Jon Caramanica complimented After Hours for its "sparkled trauma, kaleidoscopic emotional confusion, urgent and panting physical release paired with failed-state romantic dyspepsia". Writing for Consequence, Candace McDuffie stated that as the Weeknd evolves, "he continues to reinvent himself, and he knows exactly how to leave fans hooked on havoc", and After Hours proves that he is "not done with us yet; in fact, he's just getting started". Exclaim! reviewer Jacob Carey stated that "After Hours does feel like the Weeknd's very own version of Vegas – a place where overindulgence, self-loathing and promiscuity are not only welcomed, but encouraged". The Guardian's Michael Cragg praised the "sense of narrative cohesion" on the album, saying that its songs "bleed into each other", with the Weeknd exploring new sonic influences. He added that After Hours "feels like the first Weeknd album in a while to offer up a clear, singular vision rather than something frustratingly abstract". Writing for The Independent, Roisin O'Connor stated that the album eschews the danceability of its predecessor for "moody introspection", and called it "the music you listen to when the party's over". O'Connor further compared the album to the Weeknd's previous releases, saying that After Hours "still delves into a sadboy persona but there's a tinge of remorse that runs through, in comparison to the cold and often cruel tone of earlier cuts". Luke Morgan Britton of NME called it the Weeknd's "strongest record in some time", free of featured artists and "full of probing self-reflection".

Jon Dolan of Rolling Stone wrote that After Hours "has its share of pity-partying", but also displays vulnerability that "goes beyond the usual too-beautiful-for-the-world sulking". Dolan explained that the album strikes the best balance between the "gloomy melodrama" of the Weeknd's early EPs or his 2018 release My Dear Melancholy and the "pop slickness" of his 2016 album, Starboy, at once lachrymose and sleek, cold but plush, like a lavishly ornamented fallout shelter. Writing for Variety, Jem Aswad branded After Hours the "most fully realized album" of the Weeknd's career. He characterized the album's musical style as "ultra-cinematic keyboards, pulsating sub-bass, hard beats (which are seldom danceable), '80s synthesizer flourishes and caverns of echo, all of which contrast with his high, angelic voice". Aswad concluded that the album tests the balance "between innovation and commerciality as much as anyone today". In less favourable reviews, David Smyth of Evening Standard particularly praised the track "Blinding Lights", but found the Weeknd to be "in a bit of a fug" on the rest of After Hours. Tom Hull rated the album a B grade, finding it "remarkably consistent, at least until the closer drags its butt".

=== Year-end lists ===
Select year-end rankings
Publication	List	Rank	Ref.
Billboard	The 50 Best Albums of 2020	3	
Complex	The Best Albums of 2020	1	
Entertainment Weekly	The 15 Best Albums of 2020	2	
Exclaim!	Exclaim!'s 50 Best Albums of 2020	26	
NME	The 50 Best Albums of 2020	29	
Rolling Stone	The 50 Best Albums of 2020	32	
Slant Magazine	The 50 Best Albums of 2020	9	
Uproxx	The Best Albums of 2020	10	
Uproxx	The Best R&B Albums of 2020	2	
Us Weekly	10 Best Albums of 2020	8	
Variety	The Best Albums of 2020	4	

=== Industry awards ===
Awards and nominations
Year	Ceremony	Category	Result	Ref.
2020	American Music Awards	Favorite Album – Pop/Rock	Nominated	
2020	American Music Awards	Favorite Album – Soul/R&B	Won	
2020	ARIA Music Awards	Best International Artist (After Hours)	Nominated	
2020	LOS40 Music Awards	International Album of the Year	Nominated	
2020	People's Choice Awards	The Album of 2020	Nominated	
2020	Polaris Music Prize	Polaris Music Prize	Longlisted	
2020	Soul Train Music Awards	Album of the Year	Nominated	
2021	BET Awards	Album of the Year	Nominated	
2021	Billboard Music Awards	Top Billboard 200 Album	Nominated	
2021	Billboard Music Awards	Top R&B Album	Won	
2021	Juno Awards	Album of the Year	Won	
2021	Juno Awards	Contemporary R&B/Soul Recording of the Year	Won	
2021	TEC Awards	Outstanding Creative Achievement – Record Production/Album	Nominated	

== Commercial performance ==
On March 19, 2020, After Hours broke the record for the most global pre-adds for an album in Apple Music history, with over 1.02 million users pre-adding the album to their libraries. (Note: Billie Eilish's Happier Than Ever broke this record in July 2021, with over 1.028 million pre-adds.) It was the second most-streamed album of 2020 on Spotify.

After Hours debuted at number one on the US Billboard 200 with 444,000 album-equivalent units, which included 275,000 pure album sales. It is the Weeknd's fourth number-one album, and marks the biggest first week sales of 2020 for an album at the time. Additionally, after the album's first week of availability, all 14 songs charted on the US Billboard Hot 100, with ten of them in the top 40, led by "Blinding Lights" at number one, and "In Your Eyes" debuting the highest, at number 16. The album remained at number one on the Billboard 200 in its second week with 138,000 album-equivalent units, of which 47,000 were pure album sales. It is the Weeknd's third consecutive album to top the chart for multiple weeks. In its third week, the album remained at number one on the Billboard 200 with 90,000 album-equivalent units (including 23,000 pure album sales). Becoming the first album to lead for three consecutive weeks since Post Malone's Hollywood's Bleeding (2019). In its fourth week, After Hours earned 75,000 album-equivalent units (including 20,000 pure album sales), remaining at number one on the Billboard 200 chart. It's the first album to notch four consecutive weeks since Drake's Scorpion (2018). After Hours was the fourth best selling album of 2020 with 2.032 million album-equivalent units, including 480,000 pure copies in the US. In 2021, After Hours was the tenth best selling album of the year in the United States, moved 1,281,000 album-equivalent units, including 99,000 pure copies.

On December 6, 2022, After Hours was certified triple platinum by the Recording Industry Association of America (RIAA) for earning over three million album-equivalent units in the US.

The album debuted at number one on the UK Albums Chart with over 26,000 units sold, making it the Weeknd's second number one on the chart, five years after Beauty Behind the Madness. It also topped the Canadian Albums Chart of the Weeknd's home country, generating 54,000 album-equivalent units, which marked the biggest first-week album sales of the year. It achieved a total of six non-consecutive weeks atop the chart, the most by a Canadian artist since the Weeknd's own Starboy, which led the chart for seven weeks in 2016–2017.

== Grammy controversy ==
Despite the major critical success of After Hours, the Weeknd did not receive any nominations for the 63rd Annual Grammy Awards. On November 24, 2020, he responded by calling the Grammys "corrupt" in social media posts, announcing the cancellation of his scheduled live performance at the ceremony. Speculation arose over whether the announcement of his then-upcoming Super Bowl performance, as well as the confusion as to whether he should be nominated as pop or R&B, contributed to the snubs in all the categories he was submitted to by his team. Harvey Mason Jr., interim president of the Recording Academy, responded to the backlash by saying:

We understand that The Weeknd is disappointed at not being nominated. I was surprised and can empathize with what he's feeling. His music this year was excellent, and his contributions to the music community and broader world are worthy of everyone's admiration. We were thrilled when we found out he would be performing at the upcoming Super Bowl and we would have loved to have him also perform on the Grammy stage the weekend before. Unfortunately, every year, there are fewer nominations than the number of deserving artists. But as the only peer-voted music award, we will continue to recognize and celebrate excellence in music while shining a light on the many amazing artists that make up our global community. To be clear, voting in all categories ended well before The Weeknd's performance at the Super Bowl was announced, so in no way could it have affected the nomination process. All Grammy nominees are recognized by the voting body for their excellence, and we congratulate them all.

The Weeknd later remarked in an interview with Billboard that the snub felt like "an attack", asserting: "Look, I personally don't care anymore. I have three GRAMMYs, which mean nothing to me now, obviously [...] It's not like, 'Oh, I want the GRAMMY!' It's just that this happened, and I'm down to get in front of the fire, as long as it never happens again. I suck at giving speeches anyways. Forget awards shows." Despite the Recording Academy announcing the elimination of private nominating committees, the Weeknd said that moving forward with his career, he will prevent his major label executives from submitting his work for Grammy consideration.

The Weeknd would later perform at the 67th Annual Grammy Awards after being introduced by Mason Jr., who in his introductory speech declared that the Academy had revised its nominating committee in response to the controversy.

== Track listing ==
Standard edition
No.	Title	Writer(s)	Producer(s)	Length
1.	"Alone Again"	Abel Tesfaye; Jason Quenneville; Carlo Montagnese; Adam Feeney	The Weeknd; Illangelo; DaHeala; Frank Dukes^{[a]}	4:10
2.	"Too Late"	Tesfaye; Quenneville; Montagnese; Eric Burton Frederic	The Weeknd; Illangelo; Ricky Reed; DaHeala; Nate Mercereau^{[b]}	3:59
3.	"Hardest to Love"	Tesfaye; Max Martin; Oscar Holter	The Weeknd; Martin; Holter	3:31
4.	"Scared to Live"	Tesfaye; Ahmad Balshe; Martin; Holter; Daniel Lopatin; Elton John; Bernard Taupin	The Weeknd; Martin; Holter	3:11
5.	"Snowchild"	Tesfaye; Quenneville; Balshe; Montagnese	The Weeknd; Illangelo; DaHeala	4:07
6.	"Escape from LA"	Tesfaye; Montagnese; Leland Tyler Wayne; Mike McTaggart	The Weeknd; Metro Boomin; Illangelo	5:55
7.	"Heartless"	Tesfaye; Wayne; Montagnese; Andre Proctor	The Weeknd; Metro Boomin; Illangelo; Dre Moon^{[a]}	3:18
8.	"Faith"	Tesfaye; Balshe; Montagnese; Wayne	The Weeknd; Metro Boomin; Illangelo	4:43
9.	"Blinding Lights"	Tesfaye; Balshe; Quenneville; Martin; Holter	The Weeknd; Martin; Holter	3:20
10.	"In Your Eyes"	Tesfaye; Balshe; Martin; Holter	The Weeknd; Martin; Holter	3:57
11.	"Save Your Tears"	Tesfaye; Balshe; Quenneville; Martin; Holter	The Weeknd; Martin; Holter	3:35
12.	"Repeat After Me (Interlude)"	Tesfaye; Kevin Parker; Lopatin	Parker; OPN	3:15
13.	"After Hours"	Tesfaye; Quenneville; Balshe; Montagnese; Mario Winans	The Weeknd; Illangelo; DaHeala; Winans^{[b]}	6:01
14.	"Until I Bleed Out"	Tesfaye; Wayne; Lopatin; Mejdi Rhars; Notinbed	The Weeknd; Metro Boomin; OPN; Prince 85; Notinbed	3:10
Total length:				56:19

Deluxe edition
No.	Title	Writer(s)	Producer(s)	Length
15.	"Nothing Compares"	Tesfaye; Balshe; Quenneville; Frederic	The Weeknd; DaHeala; Ricky Reed	3:42
16.	"Missed You"	Tesfaye; Quenneville	The Weeknd; DaHeala	2:24
17.	"Final Lullaby"	Tesfaye; Quenneville	The Weeknd; DaHeala	3:05
18.	"Save Your Tears" (Remix) (with Ariana Grande)	Tesfaye; Balshe; Quenneville; Martin; Holter; Ariana Grande	The Weeknd; Martin; Holter; Grande^{[c]}	3:11
Total length:				68:41

Remixes EP
No.	Title	Writer(s)	Remixer	Length
1.	"Heartless" (Remix) (featuring Lil Uzi Vert)	Tesfaye; Wayne; Montagnese; Proctor; Symere Woods		3:20
2.	"Blinding Lights" (Chromatics Remix) (featuring Chromatics)	Tesfaye; Quenneville; Martin; Holter; Miller; Padgett	Johnny Jewel	4:21
3.	"Save Your Tears" (OPN Remix)	Tesfaye; Balshe; Quenneville; Martin; Holter; Lopatin	OPN	3:40
4.	"Heartless" (Vapor Wave Remix) (featuring Lil Uzi Vert)	Tesfaye; Wayne; Montagnese; Proctor; Symere Woods; Quenneville	DaHeala	2:45
5.	"After Hours" (The Blaze Remix)	Tesfaye; Quenneville; Balshe; Montagnese; Winans; Guillaume Alric; Jonathan Alric	The Blaze	3:58
6.	"Scared to Live" (SNL Live)	Tesfaye; Balshe; Martin; Holter; Lopatin; John; Taupin		3:37
Total length:				21:43

=== Notes ===
- ^{^[a]} signifies a co-producer
- ^{^[b]} signifies an additional producer
- ^{^[c]} signifies an uncredited co-producer
- Deluxe edition of the album was initially released on March 23, featuring tracks 2–6 of the Remixes EP as bonus tracks. On March 30, the release was updated to include three new bonus tracks before the remixes. On April 3, the remixes were released as a separate EP, with track 1 added, while the deluxe edition of the album was amended to end at "Final Lullaby".
- "Save Your Tears" Remix with Ariana Grande was added to the deluxe edition of the album in March 2022.
- Japanese deluxe edition includes a remix of "In Your Eyes" featuring Doja Cat and the Chromatics Remix of "Blinding Lights".

=== Sample credits ===
- "Scared to Live" contains interpolations from "Your Song", written by Elton John and Bernard Taupin.

== Personnel ==
Credits adapted from liner notes.

=== Musicians ===
- The Weeknd – vocals (all tracks), background vocalist (tracks 3–4, 9–11), keyboards, programming (tracks 1–11, 13–14), bass, guitar, drums (tracks 3–4, 9–11)
- Max Martin – bass, drums, guitar, keyboards, programming (tracks 3–4, 9–11)
- Oscar Holter – bass, drums, guitar, keyboards, programming (tracks 3–4, 9–11)
- Illangelo – keyboards, programming (tracks 1–2, 5–8, 13)
- Metro Boomin – keyboards, programming (track 6–8, 14)
- DaHeala – keyboards, programming (tracks 1–2, 5, 13)
- Frank Dukes – keyboards, programming (track 1)
- Ricky Reed – keyboards, programming (track 2)
- OPN – keyboards, programming (track 14)
- Prince 85 – keyboards, programming (track 14)
- Notinbed – keyboards, programming (track 14)
- Nate Mercereau – keyboards, programming (track 2)
- Mike McTaggart – guitar (track 6)
- Patrick Greenaway – guitar (track 8)
- Rickard Goransson – guitar (track 10)
- Michael Engström – bass (track 10)
- Wojtek Goral – alto saxophone (track 10)
- Tomas Jonsson – tenor saxophone (track 10)
- Mattias Bylund – horn arrangement, synthesizer (track 10)
- Nils-Petter Ankarblom – horn arrangement, synthesizer (track 10)
- Magnus Sjolander – percussion (track 10)
- Miko Rezler – percussion (track 10)
- Peter Noos Johansson – trombone (track 10)
- Janne Bjerger – trumpet (track 10)
- Magnus Johansson – trumpet (track 10)

=== Technical ===
- Illangelo – engineering, mixing (tracks 1–2, 5–8, 13)
- Shin Kamiyama – engineering (all tracks)
- Michael Ilbert – engineering (track 4, 10–11)
- Sam Holland – engineering (tracks 3–4, 10–11)
- Jason "DaHeala" Quenneville – engineering (track 13)
- Ethan Shumaker – engineering (track 2)
- Matt Cohn – engineering, mixing (tracks 12, 14)
- Şerban Ghenea – mixing (tracks 3–4, 9–11)
- John Hanes – engineering for mixing (tracks 3–4, 9–11)
- Cory Bice – engineering assistant (tracks 3–4, 9–11)
- Jeremy Lertola – engineering assistant (tracks 3–4, 9–11)
- Sean Klein – engineering assistant (track 9)
- Dave Kutch – mastering
- Kevin Peterson – mastering

== Charts ==
=== Weekly charts ===
2020 chart performance
Chart (2020)	Peak position
Australian Albums (ARIA)	1
Austrian Albums (Ö3 Austria)	1
Belgian Albums (Ultratop Flanders)	1
Belgian Albums (Ultratop Wallonia)	2
Canadian Albums (Billboard)	1
Czech Albums (ČNS IFPI)	1
Danish Albums (Hitlisten)	1
Dutch Albums (Album Top 100)	1
Estonian Albums (Eesti Tipp-40)	1
Finnish Albums (Suomen virallinen lista)	1
French Albums (SNEP)	2
German Albums (Offizielle Top 100)	5
Hungarian Albums (MAHASZ)	11
Icelandic Albums (Tónlistinn)	1
Irish Albums (Official Charts)	1
Italian Albums (FIMI)	1
Japanese Hot Albums (Billboard Japan)	72
Japanese Albums (Oricon)	41
Lithuanian Albums (AGATA)	1
Mexican Albums (AMPROFON)	1
New Zealand Albums (RMNZ)	1
Norwegian Albums (VG-lista)	1
Polish Albums (ZPAV)	8
Portuguese Albums (AFP)	2
Scottish Albums (Official Charts)	2
Slovak Albums (ČNS IFPI)	1
South Korean Albums (Circle)	73
Spanish Albums (Promusicae)	3
Swedish Albums (Sverigetopplistan)	1
Swiss Albums (Schweizer Hitparade)	1
Taiwanese Albums (Five Music)	1
UK Albums (Official Charts)	1
UK R&B Albums (Official Charts)	1
US Billboard 200	1
US Top R&B/Hip-Hop Albums (Billboard)	1

2025 chart performance
Chart (2025)	Peak position
Nigerian Albums (TurnTable)	93

=== Year-end charts ===
2020 year-end chart performance
Chart (2020)	Position
Australian Albums (ARIA)	9
Austrian Albums (Ö3 Austria)	62
Belgian Albums (Ultratop Flanders)	18
Belgian Albums (Ultratop Wallonia)	44
Canadian Albums (Billboard)	4
Czech Albums (ČNS IFPI)	9
Danish Albums (Hitlisten)	2
Dutch Albums (Album Top 100)	2
French Albums (SNEP)	24
German Albums (Offizielle Top 100)	61
Icelandic Albums (Tónlistinn)	4
Irish Albums (IRMA)	34
Italian Albums (FIMI)	20
New Zealand Albums (RMNZ)	25
Norwegian Albums (VG-lista)	2
Spanish Albums (PROMUSICAE)	54
Swedish Albums (Sverigetopplistan)	3
Swiss Albums (Schweizer Hitparade)	17
UK Albums (OCC)	23
US Billboard 200	8
US Top R&B/Hip-Hop Albums (Billboard)	6

2021 year-end chart performance
Chart (2021)	Position
Australian Albums (ARIA)	50
Belgian Albums (Ultratop Flanders)	29
Belgian Albums (Ultratop Wallonia)	67
Canadian Albums (Billboard)	17
Danish Albums (Hitlisten)	3
Dutch Albums (Album Top 100)	11
French Albums (SNEP)	59
Icelandic Albums (Tónlistinn)	5
Italian Albums (FIMI)	26
Norwegian Albums (VG-lista)	4
Polish Albums (ZPAV)	65
Spanish Albums (PROMUSICAE)	45
Swedish Albums (Sverigetopplistan)	5
UK Albums (OCC)	63
US Billboard 200	14
US Top R&B/Hip-Hop Albums (Billboard)	7

2022 year-end chart performance
Chart (2022)	Position
Australian Albums (ARIA)	33
Belgian Albums (Ultratop Flanders)	81
Belgian Albums (Ultratop Wallonia)	132
Danish Albums (Hitlisten)	14
Dutch Albums (Album Top 100)	18
French Albums (SNEP)	47
Icelandic Albums (Tónlistinn)	16
Lithuanian Albums (AGATA)	15
Spanish Albums (PROMUSICAE)	66
Swedish Albums (Sverigetopplistan)	34
US Top R&B/Hip-Hop Albums (Billboard)	68

2023 year-end chart performance
Chart (2023)	Position
Australian Albums (ARIA)	32
Austrian Albums (Ö3 Austria)	65
Belgian Albums (Ultratop Flanders)	51
Belgian Albums (Ultratop Wallonia)	63
Canadian Albums (Billboard)	42
Danish Albums (Hitlisten)	24
Dutch Albums (Album Top 100)	17
French Albums (SNEP)	160
German Albums (Offizielle Top 100)	63
Hungarian Albums (MAHASZ)	48
Icelandic Albums (Tónlistinn)	23
Italian Albums (FIMI)	44
Swedish Albums (Sverigetopplistan)	28
Swiss Albums (Schweizer Hitparade)	89
UK Albums (OCC)	73
US Billboard 200	159
US Top R&B/Hip-Hop Albums (Billboard)	48

2024 year-end chart performance
Chart (2024)	Position
Australian Albums (ARIA)	53
Belgian Albums (Ultratop Flanders)	109
Belgian Albums (Ultratop Wallonia)	120
Danish Albums (Hitlisten)	61
Dutch Albums (Album Top 100)	39
German Albums (Offizielle Top 100)	59
Hungarian Albums (MAHASZ)	46
Icelandic Albums (Tónlistinn)	76
Italian Albums (FIMI)	82
Swedish Albums (Sverigetopplistan)	72
US Billboard 200	96
US Top R&B/Hip-Hop Albums (Billboard)	32

2025 year-end chart performance
Chart (2025)	Position
Belgian Albums (Ultratop Flanders)	166
Belgian Albums (Ultratop Wallonia)	144
Dutch Albums (Album Top 100)	66
Hungarian Albums (MAHASZ)	65
Swedish Albums (Sverigetopplistan)	94
US Billboard 200	113
US Top R&B/Hip-Hop Albums (Billboard)	38

== Certifications ==
Certifications and sales
Region	Certification	Certified units/sales
Australia (ARIA)	Platinum	70,000^{‡}
Austria (IFPI Austria)	3× Platinum	45,000^{‡}
Belgium (BRMA)	2× Platinum	40,000^{‡}
Canada (Music Canada)	5× Platinum	400,000^{‡}
Denmark (IFPI Danmark)	7× Platinum	140,000^{‡}
France (SNEP)	Diamond	500,000^{‡}
Germany (BVMI)	Platinum	200,000^{‡}
Iceland (FHF)	Gold	2,500
Italy (FIMI)	4× Platinum	200,000^{‡}
Mexico (AMPROFON)	Gold	30,000^{‡}
Netherlands (NVPI)	Diamond	93,000^{‡}
New Zealand (RMNZ)	2× Platinum	30,000^{‡}
Norway (IFPI Norway)	2× Platinum	40,000^{‡}
Poland (ZPAV)	Diamond	100,000^{‡}
Portugal (AFP)	Platinum	15,000^{^}
Singapore (RIAS)	Platinum	10,000^{*}
Spain (Promusicae)	Gold	20,000^{‡}
Sweden (GLF)	2× Platinum	60,000^{‡}
United Kingdom (BPI)	Platinum	439,014
United States (RIAA)	3× Platinum	3,000,000^{‡}
^{*} Sales figures based on certification alone.^{^} Shipments figures based on certification alone.^{‡} Sales+streaming figures based on certification alone.

== Release history ==
Release dates and formats
Region	Date	Label(s)	Format(s)	Edition	Ref.
Various	March 20, 2020	XO; Republic	CD; digital download; streaming	Standard	
Various	March 23, 2020	XO; Republic	Digital download; streaming	Original deluxe	
Various	March 30, 2020	XO; Republic	Digital download; streaming	Updated deluxe	
Various	April 3, 2020	XO; Republic	Digital download; streaming	Remix EP	
Japan	May 22, 2020	Universal Music Japan	CD	Standard	
Various	June 11, 2020	XO; Republic	Cassette	Standard	
Various	September 25, 2020	XO; Republic	LP	Standard	
Various	November 27, 2020	XO; Republic	LP	Remix EP	
Japan	December 4, 2020	Universal Music Japan	CD	Japanese deluxe	
