= Until I Bleed Out =

2020 song by the Weeknd

Song by the Weeknd

from the album After Hours
- Released: March 20, 2020
- Studio: Republic Studios (Los Angeles, California)
- Genre: Electro; alternative R&B
- Length: 3:10
- Label: XO; Republic
- Songwriters: Abel Tesfaye; Leland Wayne; Daniel Lopatin; Prince85; Notinbed
- Producers: The Weeknd; Metro Boomin; Oneohtrix Point Never; Prince 85; Notinbed

Music video
- "Until I Bleed Out" on YouTube

"Until I Bleed Out" is a song by the Canadian singer-songwriter the Weeknd from his fourth studio album After Hours. It was released as the closing track from the album on March 20, 2020. It was written and produced alongside Metro Boomin, Oneohtrix Point Never, Prince 85, and Notinbed. A music video for the song was released on April 7, 2020.

== Background and release ==
In early March 2020, two weeks before the release of After Hours, the Weeknd showcased the song during an album listening session to Variety writer Jem Aswad, where Tesfaye also mentioned a music video for "Until I Bleed Out". The track was then officially released on March 20, 2020, alongside the rest of its parent album.

== Lyrics ==
The song's lyrics refers to the conclusion of the Weeknd's relationship with his former partner through the usage of metaphorical violence. It signifies the Weeknd running out of blood in his body and no longer having the energy needed to keep the relationship alive.

== Critical reception ==
The song was met with positive reviews, with praise for the track primarily directed towards its dark atmosphere. Jon Caramanica from The New York Times described it as being "the album's syrupy final song". J'na Jefferson from Billboard ranked the track as the twelfth best song from After Hours, complimenting the song's production, calling its instrumentals "video game-style" while adding that its "bleak echo ties the contrasting elements of the project in a neat bow." However, Billboard would later state that its abrupt ending makes it difficult to "pick up the pieces."

== Music video ==
The official music video for "Until I Bleed Out" was first announced via the Weeknd's various social media platforms on April 6, 2020. Its release occurred the following day on April 7, 2020. Directed by Anton Tammi, the music video shows Tesfaye, after the events of the "In Your Eyes" music video where he was killed, shown continuing the persona found throughout the era's promotional material and is seen navigating a balloon filled mansion in a lost, dazed, and damaged manner. The video concludes with Tesfaye stumbling out of the mansion, and collapsing on the desert ground. The music video was met with positive reception, with journalist noting its references to the Weeknd's early Trilogy material and comparing it to some films by Robert De Niro.

== Commercial performance ==
Following the releasing of its parent album, "Until I Bleed Out" debuted at number 80 on the US Billboard Hot 100 dated April 4, 2020. It was the lowest charting track from After Hours.

== Personnel ==
Credits adapted from Tidal.

- The Weeknd – vocals, songwriting, production, keyboards, programming
- Metro Boomin – songwriting, production, keyboards, programming
- Oneohtrix Point Never – songwriting, production, keyboards, programming
- Prince 85 – songwriting, production, keyboards, programming
- Notinbed – songwriting, production, keyboards, programming
- Dave Kutch – mastering
- Kevin Peterson – mastering

== Charts ==
Chart (2020)	Peak position
Canada Hot 100 (Billboard)	67
France (SNEP)	158
Greece (IFPI)	72
Lithuania (AGATA)	59
Portugal (AFP)	87
Slovakia Singles Digital (ČNS IFPI)	62
Sweden Heatseeker (Sverigetopplistan)	11
US Billboard Hot 100	80
US Hot R&B/Hip-Hop Songs (Billboard)	40
US Rolling Stone Top 100	37

== Release history ==
Region	Date	Format	Label(s)	Ref.
Various	March 20, 2020	Digital download; streaming	XO; Republic	
