= Nothing Compares (song) =

2020 song by The Weeknd

Song by The Weeknd

from the album After Hours
- Released: March 20, 2020
- Genre: Downtempo; new wave
- Length: 3:43
- Label: XO; Republic
- Songwriters: Abel Tesfaye; Jason Quenneville; Ahmad Balshe; Eric Burton Frederic
- Producers: The Weeknd; DaHeala; Ricky Reed

Audio video
- "Nothing Compares" on YouTube

"Nothing Compares" is a song by the Canadian singer-songwriter the Weeknd from his fourth studio album After Hours. It was released on March 20, 2020, alongside the deluxe edition of its parent album. The song was written and produced by The Weeknd, DaHeala, and Ricky Reed, with Belly receiving additional writing credits.

== Critical reception ==
Billboard described "Nothing Compares" as a "spooky downtempo with new wave keyboards". The lyrics wonder about the emptiness that remains when love dies.

== Personnel ==
Credits adapted from Tidal.

- The Weeknd - vocals, songwriting, keyboards, programming, production
- DaHeala - songwriting, production, keyboards, programming, production
- Ricky Reed - songwriting, production, keyboards, programming, production, mixing
- Nate Mercereau - songwriting, keyboards, programming, engineering
- Belly - songwriting

=== Additional personnel ===
- Shin Kamiyama - engineer
- Dave Kutch - mastering engineer
- Kevin Peterson - mastering assistance

== Release history ==
| Region | Date | Format | Label(s) | Ref. |
|---|---|---|---|---|
| Various | March 20, 2020 | Digital download; streaming | XO; Republic | |
