= In Your Eyes (The Weeknd song) =

2020 single by the Weeknd

- Kenny G remix cover

Single by the Weeknd

from the album After Hours
- Released: March 24, 2020
- Recorded: 2019
- Studio: Conway and MXM (Los Angeles, California); House Mouse and MXM (Stockholm, Sweden)
- Genre: Synth-pop; new wave
- Length: 3:58 (standard version); 4:20 (Kenny G remix)
- Label: XO; Republic
- Songwriters: Abel Tesfaye; Ahmad Balshe; Max Martin; Oscar Holter
- Producers: Max Martin; Oscar Holter; The Weeknd

The Weeknd singles chronology
"After Hours" (2020)	"In Your Eyes" (2020)	"Smile" (2020)

Music video
- "In Your Eyes" on YouTube

"In Your Eyes" is a song by the Canadian singer-songwriter the Weeknd and the fourth single from his fourth studio album, After Hours (2020). The song was released to contemporary hit radio on March 24, 2020, by XO and Republic Records. It was originally released four days before, alongside the rest of its parent album. The Weeknd wrote and produced the song with Max Martin and Oscar Holter, with Belly receiving additional writing credits. The original studio recording of the track features Wojtek Goral on alto saxophone, while the live version and remix of the song features Kenny G on soprano saxophone.

On May 21, 2020, a remix featuring American rapper and singer Doja Cat was released. Another remix featuring Kenny G was released on October 16, 2020, which followed the first live performance of the song.

== Background and release ==
The song was first teased in the Weeknd's After Hours short film during a scene in which he walked past a musician playing the track's saxophone solo. Later on, Island Records president Louis Bloom, in a mid-March 2020 interview with Music Week magazine, confirmed that a direct follow-up to "Blinding Lights" was set to be revealed upon the album's release. The follow-up was then announced to be "In Your Eyes", with the song being added to various popular Spotify playlists and having its radio release confirmed by Gary Trust of Billboard magazine on March 20, 2020.

=== Lyrics and composition ===
"In Your Eyes" is a 1980s inspired synth-pop track with a synth lead, alto saxophone solo, and brass accompaniments. The song is composed at a tempo of 100 BPM in the key of G minor. The Weeknd spoke about the record, co-produced by him, Max Martin, and Oscar Holter, during an After Hours listening session with Jem Asward of Variety. He stated that "when you look deeper into the song, it's more complex than it seems. It's basically about two people who are in love with each other who are just fucking each other over. The first verse is from [one] perspective and the second is from the other perspective." Asward observed that "It's like the way people think the Police's 'Every Breath You Take' is a love song, and it's not at all." The Weeknd responded, "that's how I feel about a lot of Prince and Michael [Jackson]'s music too. This is deeper, but you wanna dance to it and make love to it. That's the trick of it."

== Critical reception ==
The song received universal acclaim and was noted as a standout track from the album by critics, with the single being compared to the Weeknd's previous radio hits. Various journalists noted its heavy 80s influence, with the song's saxophone solo and synths receiving praise, being compared to hits such as M83's "Midnight City" and Katy Perry's "Last Friday Night". The New York Times writer Jon Caramanica observed that "the saxophone solo near the end of the satisfyingly electric "In Your Eyes" could be high-end Muzak (in the best way)".

Pitchfork columnist Noah Yoo wrote that "In Your Eyes" "features saxophone solos and horn arrangements so gaudy they'd make Duran Duran blush". "One of the project's biggest standout moments is the "Careless Whisper"-style sax solo thanks to instrumentalist Tomas Jannson, which takes the song to truly nostalgic proportions," observed Entertainment Weekly reviewer Candice McDuffie. Vibe writer Jack Riedy noted, "The electro-disco song is packed with enough aural embellishments that to list them requires a full Stefon voice: Chic-Esque rhythm guitar, victorious trumpet riffs, Daft Punk-Esque robotic vocals, and a full-on saxophone solo on the outro".

Stereogum editor Tom Breihan described the record as "pure coke-dusted mid-'80s yuppie club-pop. The song is clean and extremely produced '80s-style pop, and it ends with a screaming saxophone solo. "The work is slick, inventive, and pristine—'80s sounds (shimmery synths, snaky brass, ambient undertones) refracted, and polished, to sound modern," GQ.com editor Max Cea assessed. Luke Morgan Britton of NME asserted, "The jaunty 'In Your Eyes' (which comes with a euphoric, joyous and absolute killer sax solo) harks back to the sparkling bombast of 2016's Starboy".

=== Year-end lists ===
Publication	List	Rank	Ref.
Billboard	The 100 Best Songs of 2020	54	
Genius	The Genius Community's 50 Best Songs of 2020	9	
E! News	The 20 Best Songs of 2020	Placed	

== Music video ==
The music video for "In Your Eyes" was first teased by its director Anton Tammi on his Instagram story on March 21, 2020, with the Weeknd later on the following day posting the thumbnail for the visual on his social media accounts. Its confirmation as the music video for the single was confirmed eleven hours before its release, with the video premiering on March 23, 2020.

The visual stars Zaina Miuccia as the lead female protagonist and continues the storyline from the After Hours short film after the Weeknd enters the elevator with the couple. In the music video, the Weeknd, after having killed Miuccia's companion in the aforementioned elevator, chases her throughout different locations until they reach a nightclub named After Hours. There, Miuccia manages to grab an axe that she then uses to decapitate the Weeknd, with her then proceeding to dance with his lifeless head throughout the rest of the music video. The visual features the return of Wojtek Goral as the saxophone player from the album's self-titled short film and was compared to the slasher movies of the 1980s, being met with a positive reception.

Pop Matters columnist Jessica Brant exclaimed the song "feels like the obsessive longing the Weeknd writes of on "Pretty" from his 2013 album Kiss Land transformed into a movie. The story glistens with the entertaining qualities that made fans fall in love with Michael Jackson's "Thriller" video with the same omnipotence. A chilling tale with a redemptive and hilarious plot twist and great acting from model and Vogue writer Zainna Miuccia, who finds herself at the epicenter of it all". "The Weeknd has channeled horror movie vibes with his video, taking the '80s slasher vibes up a notch," stated Vibe journalist William E. Ketchum III. Complex editor Trace William Cohen praised the visual's narrative and outcome, "The video sees a knife-wielding version of Abel's After Hours character going full slasher villain, ominous lurking and all. The video fittingly ends with Abel's character on the receiving end of some hatchet-assisted poetic justice."

== Commercial performance ==
Following the releasing of its parent album, "In Your Eyes" debuted at number 16 on the US Billboard Hot 100 dated April 4, 2020. It was the highest overall debut of the week and third highest charting track from After Hours at the time. On March 9, 2021, "In Your Eyes" was awarded a Platinum certification from the Recording Industry Association of America (RIAA) for selling one million units in the United States.

On March 27, 2020, the song debuted at number 17 on the UK Singles Chart, becoming his 20th top 40 hit on the chart. Elsewhere in Europe but also outside of it, the song topped the Wallonian charts in Belgium, the top ten in the Flemish region in Belgium, Czech Republic, Denmark, El Salvador, Estonia, Greece, Norway, San Marino, Slovakia, Sweden. It also reached top twenty in Australia, Canada, Croatia, Finland, Hungary, Ireland, Malaysia, the Netherlands, Portugal, Switzerland and Singapore, top thirty in Austria, Italy, New Zealand and Switzerland, top forty in France and top fifty in Russia.

== Live performances ==
The song's debut live performance occurred during the 2020 Time 100 primetime event on September 22, 2020, where a new version of the song with saxophonist Kenny G was performed. The song's second live performance occurred during the American Music Awards of 2020 on November 22, 2020, where it was performed alongside "Save Your Tears" in downtown Los Angeles. In this performance, the Weeknd sported a bandaged look that continued the narrative of the visuals that he released for After Hours. A third live performance of the song for VEVO, directed by Micah Bickham with cinematography from Jon Chema, was released on November 24, 2020.

In August 2020, the song's Doja Cat remix was one of the tracks featured on TikTok's virtual concert: The Weeknd Experience.

== Personnel ==
Credits adapted from Genius.

- The Weeknd – songwriting, vocals, production, keyboards, programming, bass, guitar, drums
- Max Martin – songwriting, production, keyboards, programming, bass, guitar, drums
- Oscar Holter – songwriting, production, keyboards, programming, bass, guitar, drums
- Rickard Göransson – guitar
- Ahmad Balshe – songwriting
- Dave Kutch – mastering
- Kevin Peterson – mastering
- Wojtek Goral – alto saxophone
- Nils-Petter Ankarblom – horn arrangement
- Mattias Bylund – horn arrangement, recording engineer, editing
- Peter Noos Johansson – trombone
- Magnus Johansson – trumpet
- Janne Bjerger – trumpet
- Magnus Sjolander – percussion
- Miko Rezler – percussion
- Tomas Jonsson – tenor saxophone
- Michael Engstrom – electric bass
- Serban Ghenea – mixing engineer
- John Hanes – mixing engineer

== Charts ==
=== Weekly charts ===
Chart (2020)	Peak position
Australia (ARIA)	13
Austria (Ö3 Austria Top 40)	23
Belgium (Ultratop 50 Flanders)	8
Belgium (Ultratop 50 Wallonia)	1
Canada Hot 100 (Billboard)	13
Canada AC (Billboard)	10
Canada CHR/Top 40 (Billboard)	6
Canada Hot AC (Billboard)	7
CIS Airplay (TopHit)	38
Croatia (HRT)	11
Czech Republic Airplay (ČNS IFPI)	1
Czech Republic Singles Digital (ČNS IFPI)	9
Denmark (Tracklisten)	5
El Salvador (Monitor Latino)	8
Estonia (Eesti Tipp-40)	5
Euro Digital Song Sales (Billboard)	14
Finland (Suomen virallinen lista)	12
France (SNEP)	31
Germany (GfK)	68
Global 200 (Billboard)	50
Greece International (IFPI)	4
Hungary (Rádiós Top 40)	2
Hungary (Single Top 40)	13
Hungary (Stream Top 40)	12
Iceland (Tónlistinn)	2
Ireland (IRMA)	12
Israel International Airplay (Media Forest)	5
Italy (FIMI)	26
Italy Airplay (EarOne)	1
Lithuania (AGATA)	6
Malaysia (RIM)	15
Mexico Airplay (Billboard)	6
Netherlands (Dutch Top 40)	5
Netherlands (Single Top 100)	19
New Zealand (Recorded Music NZ)	24
Norway (VG-lista)	5
Panama (PRODUCE)	23
Poland Airplay (ZPAV)	1
Portugal (AFP)	11
Portugal Airplay (AFP)	1
Russia Airplay (TopHit)	46
San Marino (SMRRTV Top 50)	1
Scottish Singles Sales (Official Charts)	25
Singapore (RIAS)	13
Slovakia Airplay (ČNS IFPI)	18
Slovakia Singles Digital (ČNS IFPI)	6
Slovenia (SloTop50)	11
Spain (Promusicae)	70
Sweden (Sverigetopplistan)	7
Switzerland (Schweizer Hitparade)	12
Ukraine Airplay (TopHit)	65
UK Singles (Official Charts)	17
US Billboard Hot 100	16
US Adult Contemporary (Billboard) featuring Kenny G	27
US Adult Pop Airplay (Billboard)	33
US Dance Airplay (Billboard)	33
US Pop Airplay (Billboard)	20
US Rhythmic Airplay (Billboard)	16
US Rolling Stone Top 100	3
Venezuela (Record Report)	35

=== Monthly charts ===
Chart (2020)	Peak position
Paraguay (SGP)	59

=== Year-end charts ===
Chart (2020)	Position
Australia (ARIA)	91
Belgium (Ultratop Flanders)	20
Belgium (Ultratop Wallonia)	7
Canada (Canadian Hot 100)	40
CIS (Tophit)	129
Denmark (Tracklisten)	21
El Salvador Airplay (Monitor Latino)	100
El Salvador Streaming (Monitor Latino)	92
France (SNEP)	71
Hungary (Rádiós Top 40)	30
Hungary (Single Top 40)	61
Iceland (Tónlistinn)	5
Italy (FIMI)	63
Netherlands (Dutch Top 40)	8
Netherlands (Single Top 100)	45
Norway (VG-lista)	23
Paraguay Airplay (Monitor Latino)	76
Poland (Polish Airplay Top 100)	8
Russia Airplay (Tophit)	167
Sweden (Sverigetopplistan)	14
Switzerland (Schweizer Hitparade)	45

Chart (2021)	Position
Denmark (Tracklisten)	72
Portugal (AFP)	127

== Certifications ==
Region	Certification	Certified units/sales
Australia (ARIA)	3× Platinum	210,000^{‡}
Belgium (BRMA)	Platinum	40,000^{‡}
Brazil (Pro-Música Brasil)	Diamond	160,000^{‡}
Canada (Music Canada)	2× Platinum	160,000^{‡}
Denmark (IFPI Danmark)	2× Platinum	180,000^{‡}
France (SNEP)	Diamond	333,333^{‡}
Germany (BVMI)	Gold	200,000^{‡}
Italy (FIMI)	2× Platinum	140,000^{‡}
New Zealand (RMNZ)	2× Platinum	60,000^{‡}
Norway (IFPI Norway)	2× Platinum	120,000^{‡}
Poland (ZPAV)	3× Platinum	150,000^{‡}
Portugal (AFP)	2× Platinum	20,000^{‡}
Spain (Promusicae)	Platinum	40,000^{‡}
United Kingdom (BPI)	Platinum	600,000^{‡}
United States (RIAA)	Platinum	1,000,000^{‡}
Streaming
Greece (IFPI Greece)	Gold	1,000,000^{†}
Sweden (GLF)	3× Platinum	24,000,000^{†}
^{‡} Sales+streaming figures based on certification alone.^{†} Streaming-only figures based on certification alone.

== Doja Cat remix ==
"In Your Eyes (Remix)"

Single by the Weeknd featuring Doja Cat

from the album After Hours (Japan Exclusive)
- Released: May 21, 2020
- Studio: Conway, MXM (Los Angeles, California); House Mouse Studios, MXM (Stockholm, Sweden)
- Genre: Synth-pop; new wave
- Length: 4:00
- Label: XO; Republic
- Songwriters: Abel Tesfaye; Ahmad Balshe; Amala Ratna Dlamini; Max Martin; Oscar Holter
- Producers: Max Martin; Oscar Holter; The Weeknd

Doja Cat singles chronology
"Like That" (2020)	"In Your Eyes (Remix)" (2020)	"Del Mar" (2020)

Music video
- "In Your Eyes (Remix)" on YouTube

A remix of the song featuring American rapper and singer Doja Cat was released on May 21, 2020, two days after its announcement.

=== Background ===
Prior to the announcement of the remix, the Weeknd had released several remixes of songs off of After Hours, with artists such as Lil Uzi Vert, Major Lazer and Chromatics.

On May 19, 2020, Doja Cat posted a poll on Twitter indicating that she had recently collaborated with the Weeknd. Shortly after, she tweeted "in your eyes" and changed her Twitter display name to the same, indicating she performed on a remix of the song. The Weeknd shortly confirmed the remix, and teased the cover art and release date the next day.

=== Lyrics and composition ===
Despite the song's buoyant, synth-tipped melodies, the lyrics hint at the doubts and fears that can transpire when expressing vulnerable feelings within a relationship. The remix includes a sort of call-and-response to Weeknd's lyrics. "You always try to hide the pain/You always know just what to say/I always look the other way," the Weeknd sings. "I'm blind, I'm blind/In your eyes, you lie, but I don't let it define you/Oh, define you." Doja Cat continues the conversation with her sultry verse. "I never lied when I cried for you," she croons. "And I know you cried, too ... always had to say bye to you." Later, she raps, "One day I'm giving you space, and the next day you're giving me faces" about the song's push-and-pull emotions.

=== Critical reception ===
Althea Legapsi of Rolling Stone wrote, "The remix includes a sort of call-and-response to Weeknd's lyrics," and noted, "despite the song's buoyant, synth-tipped melodies, the lyrics hint at the doubts and fears that can transpire when expressing vulnerable feelings within a relationship." Carl Lamarre from Billboard Magazine praised their collaboration as he observed, "Welcoming Doja to his funky playground, The Weeknd allows the multifaceted star to shine on the song's second verse. After combing through the entrancing soundscape with her feathery croons, she switches into rap mode before allowing the XO star to regain momentum on the hook". Tom Breihan of Stereogum complimented Doja Cat's transformative contribution, "The Weeknd's 'In Your Eyes' is a slick piece of work full of synths and saxophones. Doja Cat sings and raps, turning the song into a duet about two self-destructive people who are extremely into each other."

"She feels right at home in The Weeknd's tripped-out pop landscape, where the melodies are intoxicating and the artists have been over-served," exclaimed Consequence of Sound columnist Wren Graves, welcoming Doja Cat's presence. Idolator editor Mike Wass applauded the pair's cohesive remix, "In an era of shabbily cobbled together remixes, this combination actually makes sense — and brings a much-needed female perspective into The Weeknd's dark and gloomy world". In a rave review, Entertainment Tonight writer Meredith B. Kile asserted, "Recruiting Doja Cat for melodies and a driving rap verse over the synth-heavy track, the Canadian crooner made beautiful Muzak out of this buzzworthy collab".

Erika Marie from HotNewHipHop shared, "The nostalgic, vintage feel of 'In Your Eyes' pairs well with disco-esque jams. They collaborated in an effort to make musical magic."

=== Music video ===
An animated music video for the remix of "In Your Eyes" was released on July 2, 2020. The visual was directed by Jeron Braxton and it features the Weeknd and Doja Cat driving through a surreal futuristic city, akin to one found in Blade Runner. In the video, the Weeknd maintains the red suit used heavily throughout the promotional material for After Hours. His character, along with Doja Cat's and the rest of the animation, are done in low polygon count style. It is the first of three animated videos released in support of After Hours, with it being followed by the visuals for "Snowchild" and the Ariana Grande remix of "Save Your Tears".

=== Charts ===
Chart (2020)	Peak position
Croatia (HRT)	11
Greece (IFPI)	80
Lithuania (AGATA)	50
New Zealand (Recorded Music NZ)	34

== Release history ==
Release dates and formats for "In Your Eyes"
Region	Date	Format(s)	Version	Label(s)	Ref.
United States	March 24, 2020	Contemporary hit radio	Original	XO; Republic	
United States	March 24, 2020	Rhythmic radio	Original	XO; Republic	
Italy	April 24, 2020	Radio airplay	Original	Universal	
Various	May 21, 2020	Digital download; streaming	Remix with Doja Cat	XO; Republic	
Italy	May 29, 2020	Radio airplay	Remix with Doja Cat	Universal	
Various	October 16, 2020	Digital download; streaming	Remix featuring Kenny G	XO; Republic	
United States	October 19, 2020	Hot adult contemporary	Remix featuring Kenny G	XO; Republic	
