= Heartless (The Weeknd song) =

2019 single by the Weeknd

Single by the Weeknd

from the album After Hours
- Released: November 27, 2019
- Recorded: 2019
- Studio: XO Studios (Hidden Hills, California); Noble Street (Toronto, Ontario)
- Genre: R&B; trap
- Length: 3:18: 2:49 (radio edit)
- Label: XO; Republic
- Songwriters: Abel Tesfaye; Leland Wayne; Carlo Montagnese; Andre Proctor
- Producers: Metro Boomin; The Weeknd; Illangelo; Dre Moon (co.)

The Weeknd singles chronology
"Power Is Power" (2019)	"Heartless" (2019)	"Blinding Lights" (2019)

Music video
- "Heartless" on YouTube

"Heartless" is a song by the Canadian singer-songwriter the Weeknd. It was released on November 27, 2019, through XO and Republic Records as the lead single from his fourth studio album, After Hours (2020). The Weeknd wrote and produced the song alongside Metro Boomin, Illangelo, and Dre Moon. The song combines R&B with elements of trap.

"Heartless" received acclaim from critics, praising it for its production, catchiness and the Weeknd's vocals. It peaked at number three on the Canadian Hot 100. Elsewhere, the song topped the US Billboard Hot 100, giving the Weeknd his fourth number-one song on the chart, and also has figured within the record charts in other 28 countries and was the last new number one single of the 2010s. A vaporwave remix of the song featuring American rapper Lil Uzi Vert was released alongside the deluxe edition of its parent album on March 23, 2020. On April 3, 2020, an extended and normal-pitched version of the Lil Uzi Vert remix was released alongside the parent album's accompanying remix EP.

== Background and release ==
The Weeknd first teased that he was working on a new album in November 2018, via a performance in which he told the crowd that "Chapter VI was coming soon." Following a trio of collaborative singles throughout 2019, on August 6, he further reassured fans that he was working on his fourth studio album. Then after a period of silence, on November 24 the single "Blinding Lights" was revealed through a Mercedes-Benz television commercial, with reports of "Heartless" surfacing a day later, along with its leaked cover art. It then premiered on the seventh episode of the Weeknd's Beats 1 radio show Memento Mori on November 27, 2019. In an interview with CR Men, the Weeknd confirmed that "Heartless" was the first song that he wrote for After Hours after the release of his 2018 EP My Dear Melancholy.

== Lyrics ==
Lyrically, "Heartless" sees the Weeknd returning to his infamous party and playboy lifestyle after his disappointment with previous relationships. Throughout the song, he presents himself as a "heartless" person who engages in promiscuity and over-indulgence in drugs and alcohol. The song's chorus references the Weeknd's collaboration with American rapper Future on the latter's "Low Life" with the lyrics "Low life for life 'cause I'm heartless".

== Critical reception ==
The song received critical acclaim. Many praised its production, catchiness and the Weeknd's vocals. It was ranked as the 39th best song of 2019 by Complex. On a statement discussing the single's position on the list, Jessica McKinney complimented the song's production and its unique vibe. On March 6, 2020, Entertainment Weekly named "Heartless" the Weeknd's 11th best single, stating that "everything about the song is colossal".

== Accolades ==
Year	Awards	Category	Result	Ref.
2020	American Music Awards	Favorite Song – Soul/R&B Song	Won	
2021	ASCAP Pop Music Awards	Award Winning Songs	Won	

== Commercial performance ==
"Heartless" entered the Billboard Hot 100 at number 32 on the issue dated December 7, 2019, becoming the highest-debuting single of the week. The following week, it jumped 31 positions to the number one position on the chart, becoming the Weeknd's fourth number-one single in the United States. Christmas songs began overtaking the upper half of the chart on the issue dated December 21, 2019, causing "Heartless" to drop sixteen places to number 17. It became the biggest drop from the number-one spot in the chart's 61-year history. (Note: "Trollz" by 6ix9ine and Nicki Minaj fell to number 34 from number one in the summer of 2020, surpassing the record.) The song later returned to the top ten (at number four) after the release of After Hours on the issue dated April 4, 2020, its first week in the top ten since December 2019. On April 5, 2022, "Heartless" was awarded a 3× Platinum certification from the Recording Industry Association of America (RIAA) for selling two million units in the United States. It was the final new number one single of the 2010s in the United States.

On the Rolling Stone Top 100 Songs chart, the song debuted at number fourteen, lodging 11.1 million streams after two days of tracking. In its second week, The song ascended at number one, becoming the Weeknd's first number-one song on the chart.

In the singer's native Canada, "Heartless" reached number three on the Canadian Hot 100. In the United Kingdom, the song reached number ten, becoming the Weeknd's seventh top-10 hit in the country.

== Music videos ==
An official vertical lyric video for the song was released on December 2, 2019. The video was shot in the Plaza Hotel and Casino in Las Vegas, Nevada; and Caesars Palace and Flamingo Las Vegas in Paradise, Nevada. The official music video for "Heartless" was released on December 3, 2019. The clip was also shot in Las Vegas, and stars the Weeknd and Metro Boomin. The video follows the two as they drunkenly explore casinos and parties, with the Weeknd later hallucinating after licking a frog. The video ends with the Weeknd running down Fremont Street and vomiting. It was directed by Anton Tammi and inspired by the cult film Fear and Loathing in Las Vegas. An official music video for the Lil Uzi Vert remix of the song was released on April 14, 2020, and it featured a montage of warped VHS footage and an anime version of the Weeknd throughout the visual.

== Live performances ==
The debut live performance for "Heartless" occurred on December 5, 2019, on The Late Show with Stephen Colbert. The performance saw the Weeknd descend into the backstage corridors of the Ed Sullivan Theater as the walls of the building bend and shift around him. A performance of "Blinding Lights" occurred the day after on the same show.

== Remix ==
The song's first official remix features rapper Lil Uzi Vert and is titled "Heartless (Vapor Wave Remix)". The Weeknd's vocals are chopped and screwed on the remix, while Lil Uzi's high-pitched vocals are also distorted. Complex's Jessica McKinney said of the collaboration, "After dropping two of the biggest albums of the year so far, it's clear both the Weeknd and Lil Uzi Vert are on a winning streak." A second non-vaporwave and extended version of the remix was released on April 3, 2020, alongside the remix EP After Hours (Remixes).

== Credits and personnel ==
Credits adapted from the Weeknd's official website and Tidal.

- The Weeknd – vocals, songwriting, production, programming, keyboards
- Metro Boomin – songwriting, production, programming, keyboards
- Illangelo – songwriting, production, programming, keyboards, engineering, mixing
- Dre Moon – songwriting, co-production
- Shin Kamiyama – engineering
- Dave Kutch – mastering
- Kevin Peterson – mastering

== Charts ==
=== Weekly charts ===
Chart (2019–2021)	Peak position
Australia (ARIA)	10
Australia Urban (ARIA)	4
Austria (Ö3 Austria Top 40)	44
Belgium (Ultratop 50 Flanders)	49
Belgium (Ultratip Bubbling Under Wallonia)	7
Canada Hot 100 (Billboard)	3
Canada CHR/Top 40 (Billboard)	6
Canada Hot AC (Billboard)	32
Czech Republic Airplay (ČNS IFPI)	53
Czech Republic Singles Digital (ČNS IFPI)	9
Finland (Suomen virallinen lista)	9
France (SNEP)	69
Germany (GfK)	36
Global 200 (Billboard)	185
Greece (IFPI)	1
Hungary (Single Top 40)	28
Hungary (Stream Top 40)	12
Iceland (Tónlistinn)	35
Ireland (IRMA)	13
Italy (FIMI)	56
Latvia (LAIPA)	5
Lebanon (Lebanese Top 20)	16
Lithuania (AGATA)	5
Malaysia (RIM)	17
Netherlands (Single Top 100)	30
New Zealand (Recorded Music NZ)	13
Norway (VG-lista)	17
Portugal (AFP)	16
Romania (Airplay 100)	46
Scottish Singles Sales (Official Charts)	57
Singapore (RIAS)	13
Slovakia Singles Digital (ČNS IFPI)	3
Spain (Promusicae)	99
Sweden (Sverigetopplistan)	27
Switzerland (Schweizer Hitparade)	16
UK Singles (Official Charts)	10
UK Hip Hop/R&B (Official Charts)	3
US Billboard Hot 100	1
US Adult Pop Airplay (Billboard)	29
US Dance Airplay (Billboard)	3
US Hot R&B/Hip-Hop Songs (Billboard)	1
US Pop Airplay (Billboard)	5
US R&B/Hip-Hop Airplay (Billboard)	18
US Rhythmic Airplay (Billboard)	1
US Rolling Stone Top 100	1

=== Year-end charts ===
Chart (2020)	Position
Canada (Canadian Hot 100)	41
US Billboard Hot 100	28
US Dance/Mix Show Airplay (Billboard)	46
US Hot R&B/Hip-Hop Songs (Billboard)	11
US Mainstream Top 40 (Billboard)	23
US Rhythmic (Billboard)	14

== Certifications ==
Region	Certification	Certified units/sales
Australia (ARIA)	3× Platinum	210,000^{‡}
Brazil (Pro-Música Brasil)	3× Platinum	120,000^{‡}
Canada (Music Canada)	3× Platinum	240,000^{‡}
Denmark (IFPI Danmark)	Platinum	90,000^{‡}
France (SNEP)	Gold	100,000^{‡}
Italy (FIMI)	Gold	50,000^{‡}
New Zealand (RMNZ)	2× Platinum	60,000^{‡}
Norway (IFPI Norway)	Gold	30,000^{‡}
Poland (ZPAV)	Platinum	50,000^{‡}
Portugal (AFP)	Platinum	10,000^{‡}
Spain (Promusicae)	Gold	30,000^{‡}
United Kingdom (BPI)	Platinum	600,000^{‡}
United States (RIAA)	3× Platinum	3,000,000^{‡}
Streaming
Greece (IFPI Greece)	Platinum	2,000,000^{†}
Sweden (GLF)	Platinum	8,000,000^{†}
^{‡} Sales+streaming figures based on certification alone.^{†} Streaming-only figures based on certification alone.

== Release history ==
Region	Date	Format(s)	Label(s)	Ref.
Various	November 27, 2019	Digital download; streaming	XO; Republic	
Canada	November 27, 2019	Contemporary hit radio	Republic	
Italy	November 29, 2019	Radio airplay	Universal	
United States	December 3, 2019	Contemporary hit radio; rhythmic contemporary	XO; Republic	

== See also ==
- List of Billboard Hot 100 number ones of 2019
