= Eesti Tipp-40 =

Estonian music chart

Eesti Tipp-40 (English: Estonian Top-40) was the official Estonian music chart launched in early 2018. It published every Monday in the Eesti Ekspress newspaper.

The main editor was music journalist Siim Nestor. The chart was based on physical sales, digital sales and streaming. Three different charts were available: Top 40 albums, Top 40 domestic/international singles and for Top 40 domestic singles.

The publication of the charts discontinued in September 2020.

== Charts ==
- Albumid tipp-40 (Top 40 albums)
- Singlid tipp-40 (Top 40 international singles)
- Eesti lood tipp-40 (Top 40 domestic singles)
