= The Weeknd videography =

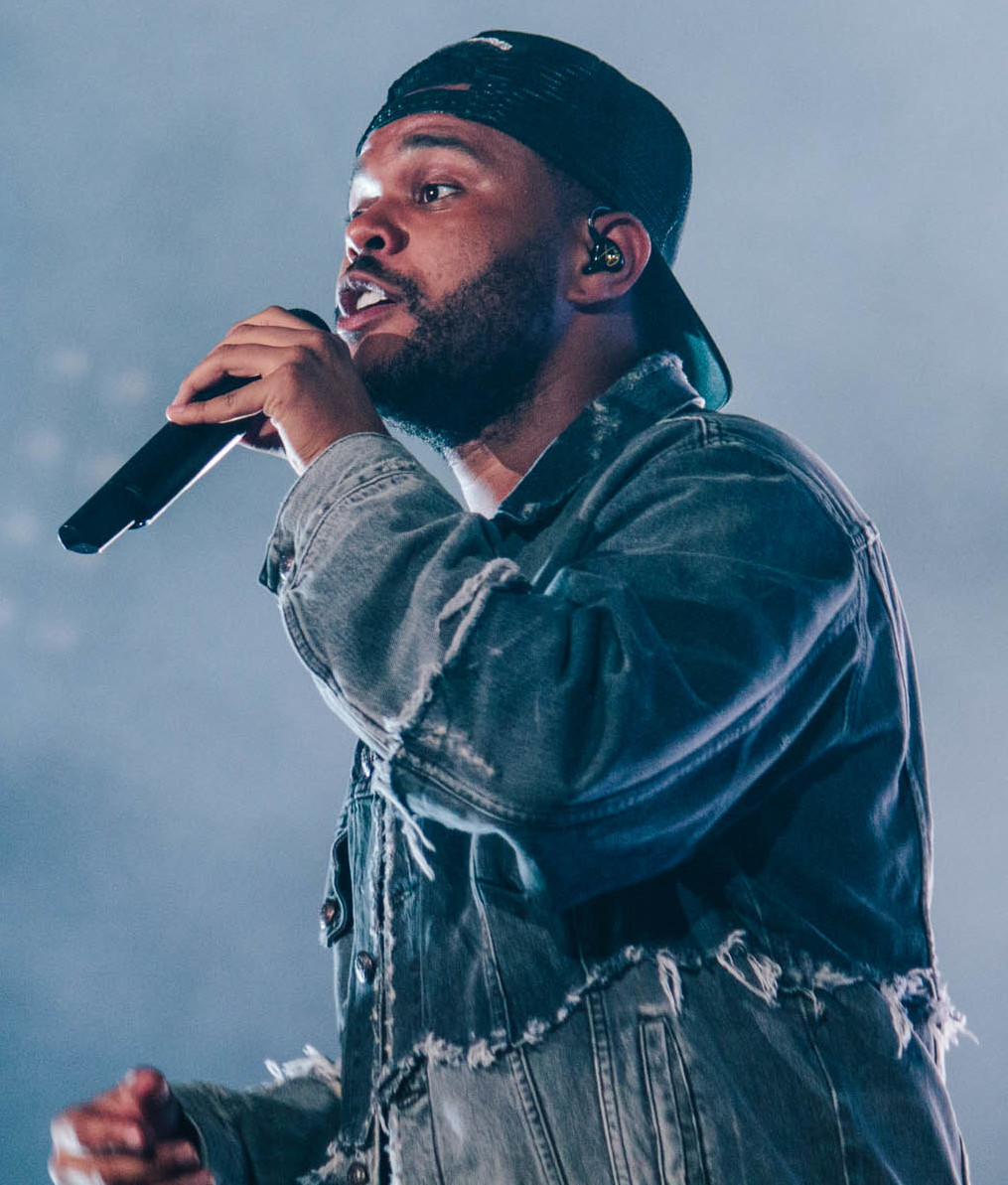
- The Weeknd performing at FEQ in July 2018
- Film: 5
- Television: 3
- Documentary: 3
- Music videos: 63

Canadian singer the Weeknd has been featured in sixty-two music videos. A noted cinephile, many of his music videos were inspired by various films. From his compilation album Trilogy (2012), Tesfaye released four music videos for the songs "The Knowing", "Rolling Stone", "Wicked Games" and "The Zone", which featured Drake. For his debut studio album Kiss Land (2013), he released five music videos for the title track, "Twenty Eight", "Belong to the World", "Live For" and "Pretty".

For his second studio album Beauty Behind the Madness (2015), he released five music videos for the songs "Often", "The Hills", "Can't Feel My Face", "Tell Your Friends" and "In the Night". Three of the five music videos were directed by Grant Singer. He also released a music video for the remix of "The Hills", which featured Eminem. In 2021, he released an alternate music video for "Can't Feel My Face".

In support of his third studio album Starboy (2016), Tesfaye released six music videos for the title track, "False Alarm", "Party Monster", "Reminder", "I Feel It Coming" and "Secrets". He also released the short film Mania, which featured additional songs from the album. The music video for the title track won the MTV Europe Music Award for Best Video. To celebrate the fifth anniversary of Starboy, The Weeknd surprise-released the music video for "Die for You" on November 25, 2021, directed by Christian Breslauer. For his debut extended play My Dear Melancholy, (2018), Tesfaye released two music videos for "Call Out My Name" and "Try Me"; the latter video was self-directed.

For his fourth studio album After Hours (2020), Tesfaye released seven music videos of the songs "Heartless", "Blinding Lights", "In Your Eyes", "Until I Bleed Out", "Snowchild", "Too Late" and "Save Your Tears". He also released a short film for the title track and a lyric/music video for the remix of "Blinding Lights" with Rosalía. In all of the videos for the After Hours era, Tesfaye played a singular character donned in a red suit and a specific hairstyle. Four of the seven music videos, as well as the short film, were directed by Anton Tammi; while two of the videos were directed by Cliqua. The original video for "Blinding Lights" won the MTV Video Music Awards for Video of the Year and Best R&B Video.

To promote his fifth studio album Dawn FM (2022), the Weeknd released six music video's up til now, for the songs "Take My Breath", "Sacrifice", "Gasoline", "Out of Time", "How Do I Make You Love Me?" and "Is There Someone Else?". A part of the title track "Dawn FM" is included in the "Sacrifice" music video. He also released two one-minute trailers for the album, and made a music video for the remix of "Sacrifice" by Swedish House Mafia on the deluxe version of the album, Dawn FM (Alternate World), and a music video with Swedish House Mafia, for the song "Moth to a Flame", also on Dawn FM (Alternate World). Five of the eight music video's were (co-)directed by Cliqua.

Tesfaye has appeared in several television shows, including co-writing and starring in an episode of American Dad! and making a guest appearance in Robot Chicken. After appearing in the concert film Taylor Swift: The 1989 World Tour Live and the documentary Michael Jackson's Journey from Motown to Off the Wall, Tesfaye made his feature film debut in Uncut Gems (2019). He was later the focus of the 2021 documentary The Show, which followed his preparations for the Super Bowl LV halftime show. His first concert film, The Weeknd: Live at SoFi Stadium which showcases his After Hours til Dawn Tour is scheduled for release exclusively on HBO Max on February 25.

== Music videos ==
Key
•	Denotes music videos directed or co-directed by the Weeknd

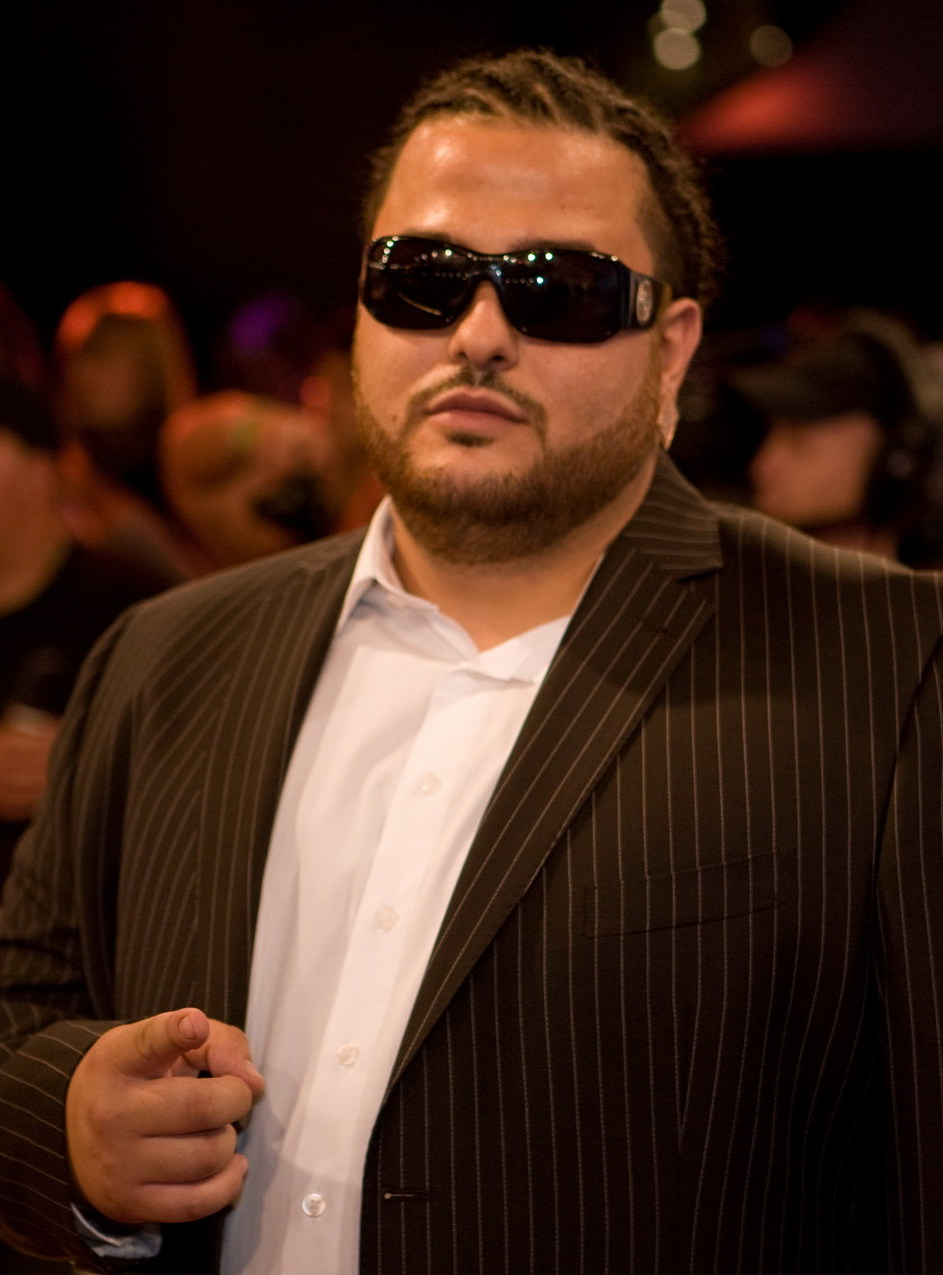
A frequent collaborator, Tesfaye has appeared in Belly's music videos for "Might Not" and "What You Want".

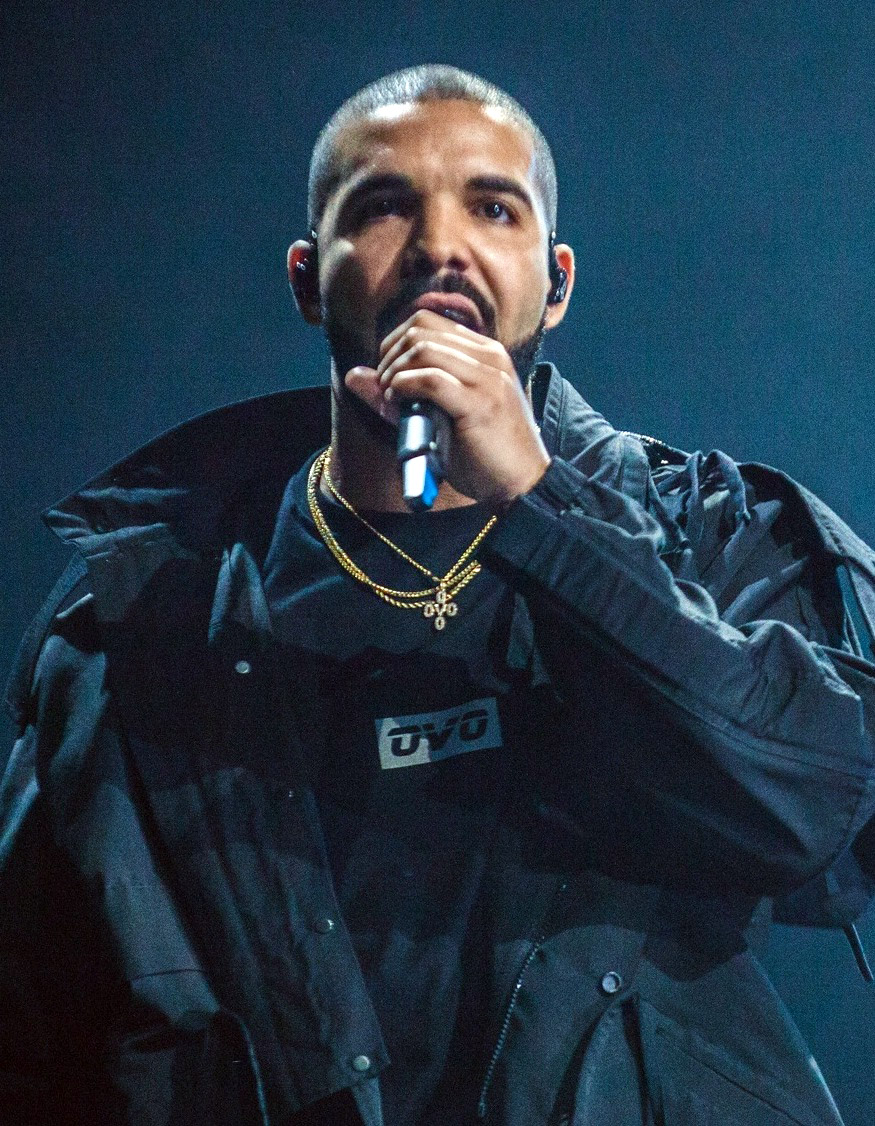
Drake was featured in "The Zone", "Live For" and "Reminder".

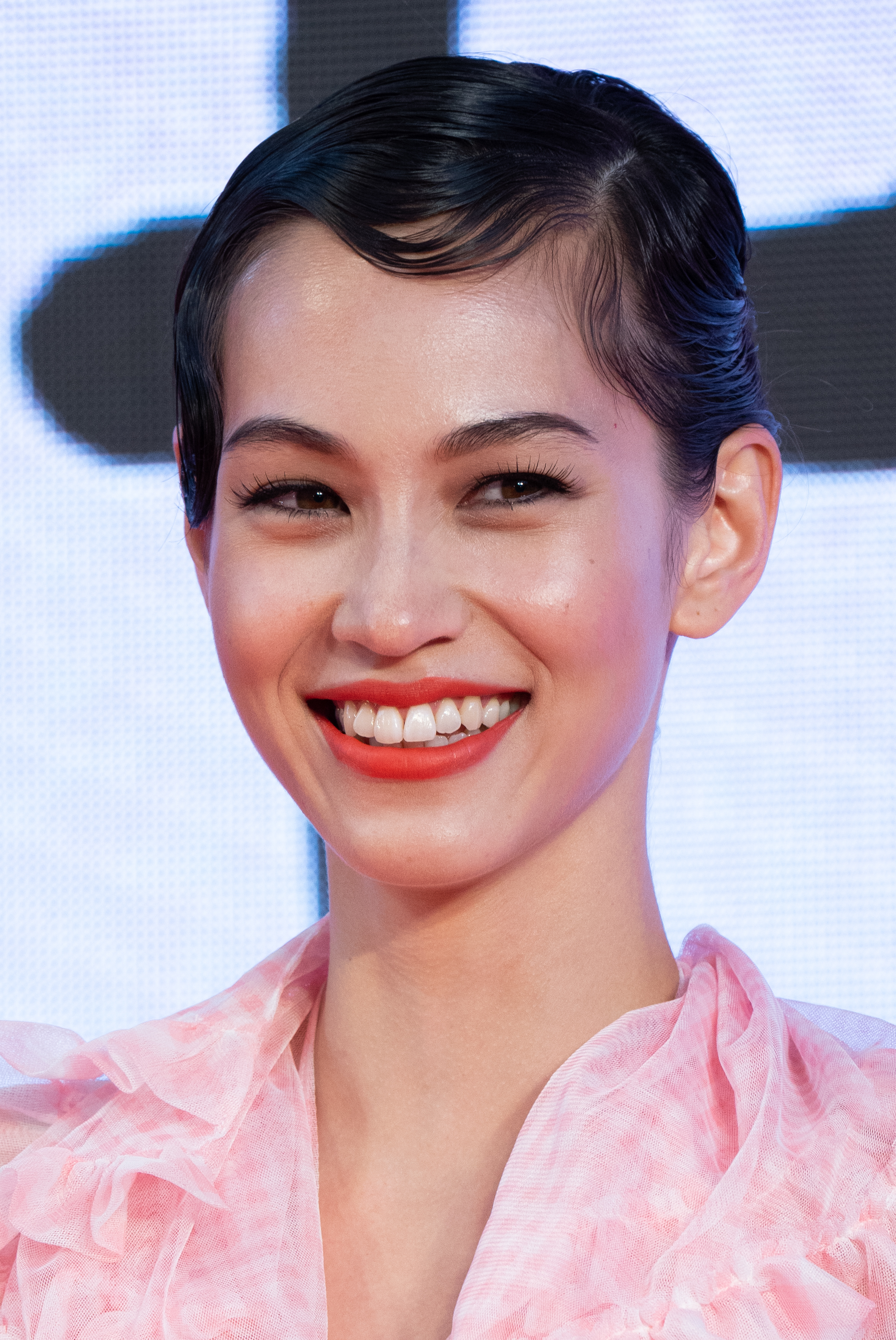
Kiko Mizuhara appeared in "I Feel It Coming".

Title	Year	Other performer(s) credited	Director(s)	Description	Ref(s)
"Rolling Stone" •	2012	None	The Weeknd	Filmed in a dimly lit studio in black and white, Tesfaye paints the relationship he has with his fans.	
"Wicked Games" •	2012	None	The Weeknd	Filmed in black and white, Tesfaye performs while the shadow of a model pulls him in.	
"The Zone" •	2012	Drake	The Weeknd	The video features psychedelic shots of Tesfaye, Drake and several women with a plethora of balloons.	
"Twenty Eight"	2013	None	Nabil	Tesfaye has a confrontation with a mysterious man.	
"One of Those Nights"	2013	Juicy J	Sam Pilling	A gunman confronts Tesfaye after robbing a bar.	
"Kiss Land"	2013	None	Andrew Baird	Set in Japan, the video contains a lot of NSFW footage.	
"Belong to the World"	2013	None	Anthony Mandler	Set in Japan, Tesfaye finds himself among the ranks of a military regime who go out for a night on the town.	
"Live For"	2013	Drake	Sam Pilling	Tesfaye and Drake perform in a dark studio and subway.	
"Pretty"	2013	None	Sam Pilling	The video revolves around Tesfaye murdering his unfaithful lover	
"Gifted"	2013	French Montana	Elf Rivera	Tesfaye and French Montana perform in a club and in an alleyway.	
"Or Nah" (remix)	2014	Ty Dolla Sign; Wiz Khalifa; DJ Mustard	Ryan Patrick	The video features Ty Dolla Sign, Wiz Khalifa, DJ Mustard and Tesfaye performing in a horror-like setting with several women.	
"Often"	2014	Jesi Le Rae	Sam Pilling	Tesfaye is filmed in a hotel room surrounded by women.	
"King of the Fall"	2014	None	Kid Studio	The video follows Tesfaye walking through his hometown of Toronto.	
"Love Me Harder"	2014	Ariana Grande	Hannah Lux Davis	Grande and Tesfaye perform while withstanding natural elements.	
"Earned It"	2015	Dakota Johnson	Sam Taylor-Johnson	As Tesfaye performs, Johnson and several other women perform a BDSM-themed burlesque dance behind him.	
"The Hills"	2015	Sophie Dalah; Rick Wilder	Grant Singer	Tesfaye is seen crawling out of a wrecked car that has flipped over. As he walks down the street, he is enragedly pushed by a woman, but he ignores her and the vehicle implodes. He goes into a house, walks up the stairs to a red coloredly lit up room with Wilder (representing a personification of the devil) there with two groupies on a couch.	
"Can't Feel My Face"	2015	Chanel Iman; Rick Wilder	Grant Singer	Tesfaye performs at a bar to an unimpressed audience, with the exception of a seduced Iman, a woman throws a cup of unknown liquid on Tesfaye until Wilder arrives and sets him on fire by throwing a lighter on him and all the bar patrons cheer and start dancing, and Tesfaye continues performing, then leaves the club and leans into the camera and begins to melt it.	
"Tell Your Friends"	2015	Rick Wilder	Grant Singer	After burying himself in the desert, Tesfaye is approached by Wilder who Tesfaye shoots then drives away at high speed.	
"The Hills" (remix)	2015	Eminem; John Travolta	Nabil	As a part of an advertisement for Apple Music, the video follows Tesfaye as he leaves a venue and heads for a limo, driven by Travolta, taking him to an afterparty.	
"In the Night"	2015	Bella Hadid	BRTHR	The video follows Hadid as a waitress at a nightclub who kills off gangsters who were taken advantage of her.	
"Might Not"	2015	Belly	Shomi Patwary; Belly	After Belly and Tesfaye get intoxicated at a party, the two fear that they might not make it out.	
"Low Life"	2016	Future; Sveta Bilyalova	Gil Green	The video features Future and Tesfaye performing in a prison-like setting. Belly and French Montana make cameo appearances in the video.	
"Starboy"	2016	Daft Punk	Grant Singer	Tesfaye reinvents himself by killing his former persona after sitting on the opposite end of a dining table wearing a mask and then ties up and suffocates the former persona with a plastic bag, and then proceeds to smash all his awards in his hills residence with a neon crucifix and then drives a red McLaren P1 with a black panther (originally a house cat) riding upfront along winding cliff roads. At the 2016 MTV Europe Music Awards, it won Best Video.	
"False Alarm"	2016	Kristine Froseth; Randy Irwin	Ilya Naishuller	The video follows a bank robbery through the first-person perspective of one of the robbers.	
"Party Monster"	2017	Zoi Mantzakanis	BRTHR	Tesfaye is seen driving through the desert before the psychedelics kicks in and he's transported to a whole new world.	
"Reminder"	2017	Drake; Metro Boomin; Bryson Tiller; ASAP Rocky; Travis Scott; Nav; French Montana	Kid Studio	Released on Tesfaye's 27th birthday, the video features an all-star cast of rappers.	
"Some Way"	2017	Nav	RJ Sanchez	Nav and Tesfaye perform whilst surrounded by women.	
"I Feel It Coming"	2017	Daft Punk; Kiko Mizuhara	Warren Fu	Tesfaye performs the song and meets Mizuhara on a rocky, barren planet in outer space.	
"Lust for Life"	2017	Lana Del Rey	Rich Lee	Del Rey and Tesfaye are seen together on the top of the "H" on the Hollywood Sign.	
"Secrets"	2017	Black Atlass; Hannah Donker	Pedro Martín-Calero	Tesfaye wanders through mysterious anomalies in search of Donker, who is also being pursued by Black Atlass.	
"A Lie"	2017	French Montana; Max B Belly	Spiff TV; French Montana	French Montana, Max B and Tesfaye perform in various locations in New York City.	
"Curve"	2017	Gucci Mane	David Helman	The black and white video shows populating clones of Gucci Mane and Tesfaye.	
"Try Me" •	2018	None	The Weeknd	Originally released as an exclusive vertical video on Spotify, the video was formally released to celebrate the three-year anniversary of the release of Tesfaye's debut extended play My Dear Melancholy (2018).	
"Call Out My Name"	2018	None	Grant Singer	Tesfaye wanders through empty streets and a desert.	
"What You Want"	2018	Belly	Colin Tilley	Belly and Tesfaye drive through a prison yard.	
"Lost in the Fire"	2019	Gesaffelstein	Manu Cossu	Gesaffelstien and Tesfaye dance slowly in a dark setting.	
"Price on My Head"	2019	Nav	Kid. Studio	The video focuses on Belly and Tesfaye's hometown of Toronto being burned down.	
"Power Is Power"	2019	SZA; Travis Scott	Anthony Mandler	Inspired by the television series Game of Thrones, Tesfaye, SZA and Scott take turns sitting on the throne.	
"Heartless"	2019	Metro Boomin	Anton Tammi	The video focuses on Tesfaye and Metro Boomin as they explore Las Vegas. It ends with Tesfaye licking a psychoactive toad and experiencing hallucinations.	
"Blinding Lights"	2020	Miki Hamano	Anton Tammi	Beginning with Tesfaye laughing while blood drips down his face, the video shows flashbacks to decipher how he got to this gruesome end. At the 2020 MTV Video Music Awards, it won Video of the Year and Best R&B Video.	
"In Your Eyes"	2020	Zaina Miuccia	Anton Tammi	Following the events of the After Hours short film, Tesfaye chases Miuccia through different locations before she decapitates him with an axe.	
"Until I Bleed Out"	2020	None	Anton Tammi	The video shows a dazed Tesfaye navigating through a balloon-filled mansion in a lost and damaged manner.	
"Too Late"	2020	Ashley Smith; Kenzie Harr	Cliqua	A heavily bandaged Smith and Harr find Tesfaye's severed head on the street and transplants it onto another man's body.	
"Hawái" (remix)	2020	Maluma; Yovanna Ventura	Jessy Terrero	The remix serves as a continuation for the original video.	
"Blinding Lights" (remix)	2020	Rosalía	Dylan Coughran	The video follows Tesfaye and Rosalía during a photoshoot.	
"Save Your Tears"	2021	Bianca Rojas	Cliqua	A disfigured Tesfaye performs at a lavish nightclub.	
"You Right"	2021	Doja Cat; Chris Petersen	Quentin Deronzier	The video is set in a majestic palace in the galaxy with heavy astrological influences.	
"Better Believe"	2021	Belly; Young Thug	Christian Breslauer	The video features Tesfaye, Belly and Young Thug in an explosive environment.	
"Take My Breath"	2021	Shaina West	Cliqua	Tesfaye and West dance together and exchange breaths through an oxygen tank at a pulsating nightclub, before Tesfaye's breath is literally taken away as he gets strangled in West's braids.	
"Die for It"	2021	Belly; Nas	James Larese	Tesfaye, Nas and Belly perform in a dystopian-like world.	
"Can't Feel My Face" (Alternate Version)	2021	Camille Rowe	Ricky Saiz	Released to celebrate the six-year anniversary of the release of Tesfaye's second studio album Beauty Behind the Madness (2015).	
"Moth to a Flame"	2021	Swedish House Mafia	Alexander Wessely	The video serves as a continuation of Swedish House Mafia's previous videos for the singles It Gets Better and Lifetime.	
"La Fama"	2021	Rosalía; Danny Trejo	Director X	Rosalía performs at a dimly lit nightclub and seduces Tesfaye into joining her onstage. The two dance together until Tesfaye is stabbed by Rosalía with a hidden dagger.	
"One Right Now"	2021	Post Malone	Tanu Muino	Tesfaye and Malone engage in a violent shootout with their respective teams.	
"Die For You"	2021	None	Christian Breslauer	Music video released for the fifth anniversary of Starboy's release. The video pays tribute to Stranger Things and E.T.	
"Tears in the Club"	2021	FKA Twigs	Amber Grace Johnson	The video features Tesfaye watching FKA Twigs perform in a tank with tears in his eyes.	
"Echoes of Silence"	2021	None	Kurando Furuya; Hajime Sorayama	Music video released for the tenth anniversary of Echoes of Silence's release.	
"Sacrifice"	2022	None	Cliqua	After the events of the "Take My Breath" music video, Tesfaye wakes up and gets abducted by some cloaked figures. He is tied up and his soul gets taken by an unknown red cloaked woman.	
"Gasoline"	2022	None	Matilda Finn	An older version of Tesfaye finds himself trapped in a disturbing dance party. As he tries to escape, he sees a younger version of himself amongst the crowd, with tears streaming down his face. When the two meet, the younger version attacks the older version and leaves him bruised.	
"Sacrifice" (Alternate World Remix)	2022	Swedish House Mafia	Cliqua	Taking place in an alternate reality, Tesfaye and Swedish House Mafia watch a ballroom scene competition.	
"Out of Time"	2022	HoYeon Jung; Jim Carrey	Cliqua	After the events of the "Gasoline" music video, the younger version of Tesfaye and Jung sing karaoke and begin a whirlwind romance alone in a hotel. His older version tries to reach out, but wakes up in an operating room as Carrey places a mask on his face. The video pays homage to Lost in Translation (2003).	
"How Do I Make You Love Me?"	2022	None	Jocelyn Charles; Cliqua	Animation directed by Jocelyn Charles. Creative direction and concept by Cliqua.	
"Is There Someone Else?"	2023	Mackenzee Wilson	Cliqua	Starring Tesfaye & Mackenzee Wilson.	
"Creepin'" (remix)	2023	Metro Boomin; 21 Savage; Diddy; Mario Winans	Christian Breslauer	Tesfaye, Metro Boomin, Diddy and 21 Savage are surveilled by a mystery woman on a rainy night. Mario Winans, the original artist of I Don't Wanna Know, which Creepin' partially covers, makes a cameo.	
"One of the Girls"	2023	Jennie; Lily-Rose Depp	Sam Levinson	Montage of scenes featuring the Weeknd, Jennie, and Lily-Rose Depp from the television series The Idol interspersed with footage of Depp singing.	
"K-Pop"	2023		Travis Scott, Bad Bunny		
"Popular"	2024	Madonna, Playboi Carti			
"Young Metro"	2024	Future & Metro Boomin			
"We Still Don't Trust You"	2024	Future & Metro Boomin	Hidji World, Omar Jones		
"Dancing in the Flames"	2024	—N/a			
"Timeless"	2024	Playboi Carti			
"São Paulo"	2024	—N/a			
"Red Terror"	2025	—N/a			
"Open Hearts"	2025	—N/a			
"Cry for Me"	2025	—N/a			
"Drive"	2025	—N/a			
"Hurry Up Tomorrow"	2025	—N/a			
"Baptized in Fear"	2025	—N/a			
Guest appearances
"Headlines"	2011	Drake	La Mar Taylor; Hyghly Alleyne	Tesfaye makes a guest appearance with members of his XO record label.	
"Sarah's Song"	2013	Ricky Hil	La Mar Taylor	Tesfaye appears alongside Hil throughout.	
"XO Tour Llif3"	2017	Lil Uzi Vert; Nav	Virgil Abloh	Tesfaye makes a cameo appearance with Nav.	

== Filmography ==
=== Film ===
Title	Year	Role	Director(s)	Notes
Road to Release	2013	Himself	Himself	Short MTV documentary
Taylor Swift: The 1989 World Tour Live	2015	Himself	Jonas Åkerlund	Concert film
Michael Jackson's Journey from Motown to Off the Wall	2016	Himself	Spike Lee	Documentary
Mania	2016	Himself	Grant Singer	Short film; also co-writer
Uncut Gems	2019	Himself	Josh and Benny Safdie	Feature film; cameo appearance
After Hours	2020	Himself	Anton Tammi	Short film
The Show	2021	Himself	Nadia Hallgren	Documentary
Live at SoFi Stadium	2023	Himself	Micah Bickham	Concert film
Live From São Paulo	2024	Himself	Micah Bickham	Concert film
Hurry Up Tomorrow	2025	Himself	Trey Edward Shults	Feature film; also co-writer and producer

=== Television ===
Title	Year	Role	Notes	Ref(s)
Saturday Night Live	2015–16; 2020	Musical guest	S41 E2, S42 E1, S45 E15	
American Dad!	2020	Himself (voice)	Episode: "A Starboy Is Born"; also co-writer	
Robot Chicken	2020	Various voices	Episode: "Endgame"	
Super Bowl LV Halftime Show	2021	Himself	Television special	
The Dawn FM Experience	2022	Himself	Television special	
The Simpsons	2022	Orion Hughes, Darius Hughes (voices)	Episode: "Bart the Cool Kid"	
The Idol	2023	Tedros	Lead role; also co-creator, writer and executive producer	
