= The Highlights =

Greatest hits album by the Weeknd
- Released: February 5, 2021
- Recorded: 2010–2020
- Genres: Alternative R&B; dark wave; new wave; dream pop
- Length: 77:55
- Labels: XO; Republic
- Producers: The Weeknd; Ali Payami; Ben Billions; Brandon Holleman; Carl Nordström; Che Pope; Cirkut; Daft Punk; DaHeala; DannyBoyStyles; Doc McKinney; Frank Dukes; Gesaffelstein; Illangelo; Kanye West; Labrinth; Mano; Max Martin; Metro Boomin; Mike Dean; OPN; Oscar Holter; Peter Lee Johnson; Peter Svensson; Stephan Moccio; Swedish House Mafia; Tommy Brown

The Weeknd chronology
After Hours (2020)	The Highlights (2021)	Dawn FM (2022)

The Highlights is the second greatest hits album, and first one released globally, by Canadian singer and songwriter the Weeknd. It was released on February 5, 2021, and follows the release of his fourth studio album After Hours (2020) and his first greatest hits album The Weeknd in Japan (2018). It was released in anticipation of his performance at the Super Bowl LV halftime show.

The track list is composed of songs from his three Billboard 200 number one studio albums: Beauty Behind the Madness (2015), Starboy (2016), and After Hours (2020), his debut mixtape House of Balloons (2011), his EP My Dear Melancholy (2018), and his two co-lead collaborations "Love Me Harder" and "Pray for Me", with Ariana Grande and Kendrick Lamar respectively, from the albums My Everything (2014) and Black Panther: The Album (2018).

A deluxe version of The Highlights was released on February 9, 2024, featuring a reworked tracklist and more songs from the Weeknd's aforementioned projects, his studio album Dawn FM (2022), the soundtrack to his television series The Idol (2023), and his promotional single "King of the Fall" (2014).

== Artwork ==
The album's cover continues the usage of the red suit that the Weeknd donned throughout the promotional material for his fourth studio album After Hours (2020). The particular suit worn in the cover art is the same one that he wore for the Super Bowl LV halftime show and in the music video for the song "Save Your Tears", which served as the fourth single from the aforementioned album.

== Critical reception ==
Professional ratings
Review scores
Source	Rating
AllMusic	4.5/5 stars

Andy Kellman of AllMusic praised the collection, stating, "The Highlights is a well-selected point of entry. That it rarely dips into album cuts and doesn't include all of the major singles speaks to the depth of the catalog."

== Commercial performance ==
The Highlights debuted at number two on the US Billboard 200 with 89,000 album-equivalent units, including 10,000 pure album sales. It is the Weeknd's highest charting compilation album, and marks the biggest first week debut for a greatest hits set since Blake Shelton's Fully Loaded: God's Country (2019), which peaked at number two on the chart dated December 28, 2019. The compilation album has managed to spend more than 130 weeks on the chart. The Highlights was the twenty-first best-selling album of 2021 according to Hits, stating the album has moved a total of 1,004,000 album-equivalent units by the end of 2021, including 74,000 pure album sales, 226,000 song sales, 1,1 billion audio-on-demand streams, and 160 million video-on-demand streams. In the next year, The Highlights was the sixth best-selling album of the year, moved a total of 1,600,000 album-equivalent units by the end of 2022, including 51,000 pure album sales, 205,000 song sales, 2 billion audio-on-demand streams, and 198 million video-on-demand streams. Though it didn't top the UK Albums Chart, The Highlights was also the biggest selling album of 2023 in the UK, with sales of over 391,000.

== Track listing ==
=== Original version ===
Standard edition
No.	Title	Writer(s)	Producer(s)	Length
1.	"Save Your Tears" (from After Hours, 2020)	Abel Tesfaye; Ahmad Balshe; Jason Quenneville; Karl Martin Sandberg; Oscar Holter	Max Martin; Oscar Holter; The Weeknd	3:35
2.	"Blinding Lights" (from After Hours, 2020)	Tesfaye; Balshe; Quenneville; Sandberg; Holter	Martin; Holter; The Weeknd	3:23
3.	"In Your Eyes" (from After Hours, 2020)	Tesfaye; Balshe; Sandberg; Holter	Martin; Holter; The Weeknd	3:57
4.	"Can't Feel My Face" (from Beauty Behind the Madness, 2015)	Tesfaye; Ali Payami; Savan Kotecha; Martin; Peter Svensson	Martin; Payami	3:33
5.	"I Feel It Coming" (featuring Daft Punk; from Starboy, 2016)	Tesfaye; Thomas Bangalter; Guy-Manuel de Homem-Christo; Martin McKinney; Henry Walter; Eric Chedeville	Daft Punk; Doc McKinney^{[a]}; Cirkut^{[a]}; The Weeknd^{[a]}	4:29
6.	"Starboy" (featuring Daft Punk; from Starboy, 2016)	Tesfaye; Bangalter; de Homem-Christo; McKinney; Walter; Quenneville	Daft Punk; Doc McKinney^{[a]}; Cirkut^{[a]}; The Weeknd^{[a]}	3:50
7.	"Pray for Me" (with Kendrick Lamar; from Black Panther, 2018)	Tesfaye; Kendrick Lamar Duckworth; Adam Feeney; Quenneville; McKinney	Frank Dukes; Doc McKinney	3:31
8.	"Heartless" (from After Hours, 2020)	Tesfaye; Leland Tyler Wayne; Carlo Montagnese; Andre Proctor	Metro Boomin; The Weeknd; Illangelo; Dre Moon^{[a]}	3:21
9.	"Often" (from Beauty Behind the Madness, 2015)	Tesfaye; Benjamin Diehl; Quenneville; Balshe; Danny Schofield; Ali Kocatepe; Sabahattin Ali; Osman İşmen	Ben Billions; The Weeknd; DaHeala^{[a]}	4:09
10.	"The Hills" (from Beauty Behind the Madness, 2015)	Tesfaye; Balshe; Emmanuel Nickerson; Montagnese	Mano; Illangelo	4:02
11.	"Call Out My Name" (from My Dear Melancholy, 2018)	Tesfaye; Feeney; Nicolas Jaar	Dukes	3:48
12.	"Die for You" (from Starboy, 2016)	Tesfaye; McKinney; Prince 85; Dylan Wiggins; Magnus Høiberg; William Thomas Walsh	Doc McKinney; Cirkut; The Weeknd; Cashmere Cat^{[a]}; Prince 85^{[a]}	4:20
13.	"Earned It" (from Fifty Shades of Grey, 2014 and Beauty Behind the Madness, 2015)	Tesfaye; Stephan Moccio; Quenneville; Balshe	Moccio; DaHeala	4:37
14.	"Love Me Harder" (with Ariana Grande; from My Everything, 2014)	Martin; Kotecha; Svensson; Payami; Tesfaye; Balshe	Payami; Svensson; Peter Carlsson^{[b]}	3:56
15.	"Acquainted" (from Beauty Behind the Madness, 2015)	Tesfaye; Quenneville; Schofield; Montagnese; Diehl	Ben Billions; Illangelo; DaHeala; DannyBoyStyles; The Weeknd	5:48
16.	"Wicked Games" (from House of Balloons, 2011)	Tesfaye; McKinney; Montagnese; Rainer Millar Blancheur	Doc McKinney; Illangelo	5:25
17.	"The Morning" (from House of Balloons, 2011)	Tesfaye; McKinney; Montagnese	McKinney; Illangelo	5:15
18.	"After Hours" (from After Hours, 2020)	Tesfaye; Quenneville; Balshe; Montagnese; Mario Winans	Illangelo; The Weeknd; DaHeala; Winans^{[c]}	6:01
Total length:				77:55

=== 2024 version ===
Digital deluxe edition
No.	Title	Writer(s)	Producer(s)	Length
1.	"Die for You" (from Starboy, 2016)	Tesfaye; McKinney; Prince 85; Dylan Wiggins; Høiberg; William Thomas Walsh	Doc McKinney; Cirkut; The Weeknd; Cashmere Cat^{[a]}; Prince 85^{[a]}	4:20
2.	"Starboy" (featuring Daft Punk; from Starboy, 2016)	Tesfaye; Bangalter; de Homem-Christo; McKinney; Walter; Quenneville	Daft Punk; Doc McKinney^{[a]}; Cirkut^{[a]}; The Weeknd^{[a]}	3:50
3.	"Save Your Tears" (from After Hours, 2020)	Tesfaye; Balshe; Quenneville; Sandberg; Holter	Martin; Oscar Holter; The Weeknd	3:35
4.	"Blinding Lights" (from After Hours, 2020)	Tesfaye; Balshe; Quenneville; Sandberg; Holter	Martin; Holter; The Weeknd	3:23
5.	"In Your Eyes" (from After Hours, 2020)	Tesfaye; Balshe; Sandberg; Holter	Martin; Holter; The Weeknd	3:57
6.	"Wicked Games" (from House of Balloons, 2011)	Tesfaye; McKinney; Montagnese; Rainer Millar Blancheur	Doc McKinney; Illangelo	5:25
7.	"Can't Feel My Face" (from Beauty Behind the Madness, 2015)	Tesfaye; Payami; Kotecha; Martin; Svensson	Martin; Payami	3:33
8.	"I Feel It Coming" (featuring Daft Punk; from Starboy, 2016)	Tesfaye; Bangalter; de Homem-Christo; McKinney; Walter; Chedeville	Daft Punk; Doc McKinney^{[a]}; Cirkut^{[a]}; The Weeknd^{[a]}	4:29
9.	"Pray for Me" (with Kendrick Lamar; from Black Panther, 2018)	Tesfaye; Duckworth; Feeney; Quenneville; McKinney	Dukes; Doc McKinney	3:31
10.	"Heartless" (from After Hours, 2020)	Tesfaye; Wayne; Montagnese; Proctor	Metro Boomin; The Weeknd; Illangelo; Dre Moon^{[a]}	3:21
11.	"The Hills" (from Beauty Behind the Madness, 2015)	Tesfaye; Balshe; Nickerson; Montagnese	Mano; Illangelo	4:02
12.	"The Morning" (from House of Balloons, 2011)	Tesfaye; McKinney; Montagnese	McKinney; Illangelo	5:15
13.	"Call Out My Name" (from My Dear Melancholy, 2018)	Tesfaye; Feeney; Jaar	Dukes	3:48
14.	"Often" (from Beauty Behind the Madness, 2015)	Tesfaye; Diehl; Quenneville; Balshe; Schofield; Ali Kocatepe; Ali; İşmen	Ben Billions; The Weeknd; DaHeala^{[a]}	4:09
15.	"Love Me Harder" (with Ariana Grande; from My Everything, 2014)	Martin; Kotecha; Svensson; Payami; Tesfaye; Balshe	Payami; Svensson; Carlsson^{[b]}	3:56
16.	"Earned It" (from Fifty Shades of Grey, 2014 and Beauty Behind the Madness, 2015)	Tesfaye; Moccio; Quenneville; Balshe	Moccio; DaHeala	4:37
17.	"Acquainted" (from Beauty Behind the Madness, 2015)	Tesfaye; Quenneville; Schofield; Montagnese; Diehl	Ben Billions; Illangelo; DaHeala; DannyBoyStyles; The Weeknd	5:48
18.	"After Hours" (from After Hours, 2020)	Tesfaye; Quenneville; Balshe; Montagnese; Winans	Illangelo; The Weeknd; DaHeala; Winans^{[c]}	6:01
19.	"One of the Girls" (with Jennie and Lily-Rose Depp; from The Idol Episode 4, 2023)	Tesfaye; Michael Dean; Samuel Levinson; Lily-Rose Depp; Rebecca Fisher	The Weeknd; Mike Dean; Sage Skolfield^{[c]}	4:04
20.	"Popular" (with Madonna featuring Playboi Carti; 2023)	Tesfaye; Jordan Carter; Wayne; Dean; Tommy Rush; Levinson; Michael Walker; John Flippin	The Weeknd; Metro Boomin; Dean	3:35
21.	"I Was Never There" (with Gesaffelstein; from My Dear Melancholy, 2018)	Tesfaye; Mike Lévy; Feeney	Gesaffelstein; Frank Dukes	4:01
22.	"House of Balloons / Glass Table Girls" (from House of Balloons, 2011)	Tesfaye; McKinney; Montagnese; Susan Ballion; Peter Clarke; John McGeoch; Steven Severin	Doc McKinney; Illangelo	6:47
23.	"Less than Zero" (from Dawn FM, 2022)	Tesfaye; Martin; Holter	The Weeknd; Martin; Holter; OPN^{[c]}	3:31
24.	"Is There Someone Else?" (from Dawn FM, 2022)	Tesfaye; Lopatin; Martin; Thomas Brown; Peter Lee Johnson	The Weeknd; OPN; Martin; Tommy Brown; Johnson; Martin^{[c]}; Holter^{[c]}	3:19
25.	"Party Monster" (from Starboy, 2016)	Tesfaye; Diehl; McKinney; Balshe; Lana Del Rey	Ben Billions; Doc McKinney; The Weeknd	4:09
26.	"Stargirl Interlude" (featuring Lana Del Rey; from Starboy, 2016)	Tesfaye; Del Rey; McKinney; Timothy McKenzie	Doc McKinney; Labrinth	1:51
27.	"Tell Your Friends" (from Beauty Behind the Madness, 2015)	Tesfaye; Kanye West; Christopher Pope; Montagnese; Carl Marshall; Robert Holmes	Che Pope; West; The Weeknd; Illangelo^{[a]}; Dean^{[a]}; Noah Goldstein^{[c]}; Omar Riad^{[c]}	5:34
28.	"Sacrifice" (from Dawn FM, 2022)	Tesfaye; Martin; Hedfors; Angello; Ingrosso; Carl Nordström; Holter; Kevin McCord	The Weeknd; Martin; Swedish House Mafia; Holter	3:08
29.	"Reminder" (from Starboy, 2016)	Tesfaye; Nickerson; McKinney; Dylan Wiggins; Walter; Quenneville	Doc McKinney; Mano; Cirkut	3:38
30.	"In the Night" (from Beauty Behind the Madness, 2015)	Tesfaye; Balshe; Payami; Kotecha; Svensson; Martin	Martin; Payami; The Weeknd^{[a]}	3:55
31.	"Wasted Times" (from My Dear Melancholy, 2018)	Tesfaye; Brittany Hazzard; Sonny Moore; Feeney	Frank Dukes; Skrillex^{[a]}	3:40
32.	"Take My Breath" (from Dawn FM, 2022)	Tesfaye; Balshe; Andrea Di Ceglie; Luigi Tutolo; Martin; Holter	The Weeknd; Martin; Holter	5:39
33.	"Moth to a Flame" (with Swedish House Mafia; from Paradise Again, 2022 and Dawn FM (Alternate World), 2022)	Tesfaye; Angello; Ingrosso; Nordström	Swedish House Mafia; Nordström	3:54
34.	"Out of Time" (from Dawn FM, 2022)	Tesfaye; Lopatin; Martin; Holter; Tomoko Aran; Tetsurō Oda	The Weeknd; OPN; Martin^{[c]}; Holter^{[c]}	3:34
35.	"King of the Fall" (2014)	Quenneville; Tesfaye	DaHeala; Dean; Brandon Hollemon; The Weeknd	5:01
36.	"High for This" (from House of Balloons, 2011)	Tesfaye; Adrien Gough; Walter	Cirkut	4:07
Total length:				151:22

=== Notes ===
- ^{^[a]} signifies a co-producer
- ^{^[b]} denotes a vocal producer
- ^{^[c]} signifies an additional producer

== Charts ==
=== Weekly charts ===
Weekly chart performance for The Highlights
Chart (2021–2024)	Peak position
Argentine Albums (CAPIF)	8
Australian Albums (ARIA)	2
Austrian Albums (Ö3 Austria)	15
Belgian Albums (Ultratop Flanders)	10
Belgian Albums (Ultratop Wallonia)	21
Canadian Albums (Billboard)	1
Czech Albums (ČNS IFPI)	79
Danish Albums (Hitlisten)	27
Dutch Albums (Album Top 100)	29
French Albums (SNEP)	4
German Albums (Offizielle Top 100)	13
Irish Albums (Official Charts)	1
Italian Albums (FIMI)	44
Japanese Albums (Oricon)	83
Lithuanian Albums (AGATA)	78
New Zealand Albums (RMNZ)	1
Norwegian Albums (VG-lista)	16
Polish Albums (ZPAV)	7
Portuguese Albums (AFP)	2
Scottish Albums (Official Charts)	11
Slovak Albums (ČNS IFPI)	70
Spanish Albums (Promusicae)	30
Swiss Albums (Schweizer Hitparade)	10
UK Albums (Official Charts)	2
UK R&B Albums (Official Charts)	1
US Billboard 200	2
US Top R&B/Hip-Hop Albums (Billboard)	1

=== Year-end charts ===
2021 year-end chart performance for The Highlights
Chart (2021)	Position
Australian Albums (ARIA)	9
Belgian Albums (Ultratop Flanders)	153
Belgian Albums (Ultratop Wallonia)	123
Canadian Albums (Billboard)	10
French Albums (SNEP)	24
Irish Albums (IRMA)	15
New Zealand Albums (RMNZ)	10
UK Albums (OCC)	11
US Billboard 200	31
US Top R&B/Hip-Hop Albums (Billboard)	16

2022 year-end chart performance for The Highlights
Chart (2022)	Position
Australian Albums (ARIA)	3
Canadian Albums (Billboard)	3
French Albums (SNEP)	51
New Zealand Albums (RMNZ)	3
Polish Albums (ZPAV)	85
UK Albums (OCC)	4
US Billboard 200	10
US Top R&B/Hip-Hop Albums (Billboard)	2

2023 year-end chart performance for The Highlights
Chart (2023)	Position
Australian Albums (ARIA)	3
Canadian Albums (Billboard)	7
French Albums (SNEP)	92
Italian Albums (FIMI)	83
New Zealand Albums (RMNZ)	2
UK Albums (OCC)	1
US Billboard 200	14
US Top R&B/Hip-Hop Albums (Billboard)	6

2024 year-end chart performance for The Highlights
Chart (2024)	Position
Australian Albums (ARIA)	4
Canadian Albums (Billboard)	5
UK Albums (OCC)	2
US Billboard 200	63
US Top R&B/Hip-Hop Albums (Billboard)	34

2025 year-end chart performance for The Highlights
Chart (2025)	Position
Australian Albums (ARIA)	14
Canadian Albums (Billboard)	3
UK Albums (OCC)	6
US Billboard 200	149
US Top R&B/Hip-Hop Albums (Billboard)	48

== Certifications ==
Certifications for The Highlights
Region	Certification	Certified units/sales
Australia (ARIA)	3× Platinum	210,000^{‡}
Brazil (Pro-Música Brasil)	5× Diamond	800,000^{‡}
Canada (Music Canada)	3× Platinum	240,000^{‡}
Denmark (IFPI Danmark)	Gold	10,000^{‡}
France (SNEP)	3× Platinum	300,000^{‡}
Italy (FIMI)	Platinum	50,000^{‡}
New Zealand (RMNZ)	8× Platinum	120,000^{‡}
Poland (ZPAV)	Gold	10,000^{‡}
United Kingdom (BPI)	6× Platinum	1,800,000^{‡}
^{‡} Sales+streaming figures based on certification alone.

== Release history ==
Release history for The Highlights
Region	Date	Format	Label	Edition	Ref.
Various	February 5, 2021	CD; digital download; streaming	XO; Republic	Standard	
United Kingdom	February 5, 2021	Cassette	XO; Republic	Standard	
Japan	March 5, 2021	CD	Universal Music Japan	Standard	
Various	November 19, 2021	LP	XO; Republic	Standard	
Various	February 9, 2024	Digital download; streaming	XO; Republic	Deluxe	
