= Live at SoFi Stadium =

Live album by the Weeknd
- Released: March 3, 2023
- Recorded: November 26–27, 2022
- Venues: SoFi Stadium, Inglewood, California
- Length: 95:00
- Labels: XO; Republic

The Weeknd chronology
| Dawn FM (2022) | Live at SoFi Stadium (2023) | The Idol Episode 1 (Music from the HBO Original Series) (2023) |

Live at SoFi Stadium is the first live album by Canadian singer the Weeknd. It was released on March 3, 2023, through XO and Republic Records. The album was recorded during two November 2022 concerts at the SoFi Stadium in Inglewood, California, as a part of After Hours til Dawn Tour. A week earlier, the concert film of the same name was released on HBO Max and became the highest debut for a music special in the history of HBO Max. The set list includes songs from the Weeknd's previous projects: Dawn FM (2022), After Hours (2020), My Dear Melancholy (2018), Starboy (2016), Beauty Behind the Madness (2015), Kiss Land (2013), and House of Balloons (2011), along with multiple songs he was featured on.

== Background and release ==
In February 2020, the Weeknd announced he would embark on The After Hours Tour in support of the album of the same name. The tour was due to kick-off in June of that year and was to be his first tour outside of Asia since 2017's Starboy: Legend of the Fall Tour. However, due to the initial wave of the COVID-19 pandemic, the tour was originally postponed to 2021 and later, January 2022. On August 6, 2021, the Weeknd released "Take My Breath", the lead single from Dawn FM. To reflect the release of a new album while still incorporating its predecessor, he announced in October that the tour would be renamed and postponed for a third time to summer 2022. The tour was also moved from arenas to stadiums. The new tour, titled the After Hours til Dawn Tour, was finally announced on March 3, 2022, and kicked off on July 14 in Philadelphia.

On February 2, 2023, the Weeknd announced that a concert film recorded at two sold-out shows at SoFi Stadium in Inglewood, California on November 26 and 27, 2022 would be released on HBO/HBO Max on February 25. The concert film, titled Live at SoFi Stadium, became the highest debut for a music special in the history of HBO Max. On March 1, 2023, The Weeknd announced the release of his first live album, titled after the concert film. It was released on March 3 on streaming services and as a digital download. The album, which runs for exactly 95 minutes, consists of 31 tracks, encompassing every song performed during the show in addition to the introduction and concluding segments of the concert. On April 20, 2024, the album received a physical release on vinyl as part of Record Store Day.

== Track listing ==
Live at SoFi Stadium track listing
| No. | Title | Writer(s) | Length |
|---|---|---|---|
| 1. | "Intro" | Abel Tesfaye; Michael Dean | 1:35 |
| 2. | "Alone Again" | Tesfaye; Jason Quenneville; Carlo Montagnese; Adam Feeney | 2:47 |
| 3. | "Gasoline" | Tesfaye; Daniel Lopatin; Max Martin; Oscar Holter; Matt Cohn | 3:15 |
| 4. | "Sacrifice" | Tesfaye; Martin; Axel Hedfors; Steve Angello; Sebastian Ingrosso; Carl Nordström; Holter; Kevin McCord | 4:23 |
| 5. | "How Do I Make You Love Me?" | Tesfaye; Lopatin; Martin; Hedfors; Angello; Ingrosso; Holter; Cohn | 3:29 |
| 6. | "Can't Feel My Face" | Tesfaye; Ali Payami; Savan Kotecha; Martin; Peter Svensson | 3:03 |
| 7. | "Take My Breath" | Tesfaye; Ahmad Balshe; Andrea Di Ceglie; Luigi Tutolo; Martin; Holter | 3:55 |
| 8. | "Hurricane" | Kanye West; Tesfaye; Dominique Jones; Dean; Jahmal Gwin; Khalil Abdul-Rahman; Ronald Spence Jr.; Henry Walter; Mark Williams; Raul Cubina; Charles Njapa; Christopher Ruelas; Mark Mbogo; Nasir Pemberton; Sam Barsh; Josh Mease; Cydel Young; Malik Yusef; Orlando Wilder; Albert Daniels; Cailin Russo; Daniel Seeff; Dexter Mills; Tobias Smith | 2:07 |
| 9. | "The Hills" | Tesfaye; Balshe; Emmanuel Nickerson; Montagnese | 3:05 |
| 10. | "Often" | Tesfaye; Benjamin Diehl; Quenneville; Balshe; Danny Schofield; Ali Kocatepe; Sabahattin Ali; Osman İşmen | 2:28 |
| 11. | "Crew Love" | Aubrey Graham; Tesfaye; Montagnese; Noah Shebib; Anthony Palman | 1:53 |
| 12. | "Starboy" | Tesfaye; Thomas Bangalter; Guy-Manuel de Homem-Christo; Martin McKinney; Walter; Quenneville | 4:05 |
| 13. | "Heartless" | Tesfaye; Leland Wayne; Montagnese; Andre Proctor | 2:04 |
| 14. | "Low Life" | Nayvadius Wilburn; Tesfaye; Wayne; Diehl; Quenneville | 1:47 |
| 15. | "Or Nah" | Tyrone Griffin; Cameron Thomaz; Dijon McFarlane; Mikely Adam; Lemmie Crockem | 1:41 |
| 16. | "Kiss Land" | Tesfaye; Schofield; Jack Holkeboer; Quenneville; Sébastien Tellier | 1:50 |
| 17. | "Party Monster" | Tesfaye; Diehl; McKinney; Balshe; Lana Del Rey | 3:09 |
| 18. | "Faith" | Tesfaye; Balshe; Montagnese; Wayne | 3:05 |
| 19. | "After Hours" | Tesfaye; Quenneville; Balshe; Montagnese; Mario Winans | 4:27 |
| 20. | "Out of Time" | Tesfaye; Lopatin; Martin; Holter; Tomoko Aran; Tetsurō Oda | 3:20 |
| 21. | "I Feel It Coming" | Tesfaye; Bangalter; de Homem-Christo; McKinney; Walter; Eric Chedeville | 3:54 |
| 22. | "Die for You" | Tesfaye; McKinney; Mejdi Rhars; Dylan Wiggins; Magnus Høiberg; William Thomas Walsh; Walter | 3:13 |
| 23. | "Is There Someone Else?" | Tesfaye; Lopatin; Martin; Thomas Brown; Peter Lee Johnson | 3:57 |
| 24. | "I Was Never There" | Tesfaye; Mike Lévy; Feeney | 2:17 |
| 25. | "Wicked Games" | Tesfaye; McKinney; Montagnese; Rainer Millar Blanchaer | 2:23 |
| 26. | "Call Out My Name" | Tesfaye; Feeney; Nicolas Jaar | 4:02 |
| 27. | "The Morning" | Tesfaye; McKinney; Montagnese | 3:19 |
| 28. | "Save Your Tears" | Tesfaye; Balshe; Quenneville; Martin; Holter | 2:58 |
| 29. | "Less than Zero" | Tesfaye; Martin; Holter | 4:04 |
| 30. | "Blinding Lights" | Tesfaye; Balshe; Quenneville; Martin; Holter | 4:13 |
| 31. | "Outro" | Tesfaye; Dean | 3:10 |
| Total length: | | | 95:00 |

== Personnel ==
Adapted from HBO special closing credits.

- The Weeknd – performer, executive producer, music director
- Micah Bickham – director, executive producer
- La Mar Taylor – executive producer, creative director
- Jordy Wax – executive producer
- Aaron Cooke – executive producer
- Amy Barker – associate director
- Patrick Greenaway – musical director, guitar
- Ricky Lewis – drums
- Ledaris "LJ" Jones – bass, keyboards
- Mike Dean – synths, guitar, pre-production, mixer
- Derek Brener - Mixer, FOH Engineer, Record Engineer
- Steve Hollander – stage manager
- Matt Petroff – tour manager
- Robert Deceglio – production manager
- Jason Baeri – lightning design
- Es Devlin Studio – production design
- Sila Sveta – visual design
- Charm La'Donna – choreographer
- Alex Clark – assistant choreographer
- Tanya Karn – assistant choreographer

== Charts ==
Chart performance for Live at SoFi Stadium
| Chart (2024) | Peak position |
|---|---|
| Croatian International Albums (HDU) | 9 |
| Dutch Albums (Album Top 100) | 44 |
| Portuguese Albums (AFP) | 117 |
| Scottish Albums (Official Charts) | 30 |
| UK Albums Sales (OCC) | 38 |
| UK Physical Albums (OCC) | 36 |
| US Billboard 200 | 172 |

== Release history ==
Release history for Live at SoFi Stadium
| Region | Date | Label(s) | Format(s) | Ref. |
|---|---|---|---|---|
| Various | March 3, 2023 | XO; Republic | Digital download; streaming | |
| Various | April 20, 2024 | XO; Republic | LP | |
