= I Heard You're Married =

2022 song by the Weeknd featuring Lil Wayne

Song by the Weeknd featuring Lil Wayne

from the album Dawn FM
- Released: January 7, 2022
- Genre: Synth-pop; electro-funk
- Length: 4:24
- Label: XO; Republic
- Songwriters: Abel Tesfaye; Dwayne Carter, Jr.; Adam Wiles; Daniel Lopatin
- Producers: The Weeknd; Calvin Harris; Oneohtrix Point Never; Max Martin; Oscar Holter

"I Heard You're Married" is a song by Canadian singer-songwriter the Weeknd featuring American rapper Lil Wayne. It was released as the fourteenth track on the former's fifth studio album, Dawn FM, on January 7, 2022. A synth-pop and electro-funk track, the two artists wrote the song with producers Calvin Harris and Oneohtrix Point Never with more production credits going to the Weeknd, Max Martin, and Oscar Holter. It is the second collaboration between the Weeknd and Lil Wayne, following their collaboration on the song "I'm Good" from the latter's mixtape, Dedication 5 (2013). The song was met with generally positive reviews, with praise for its production and the Weeknd's vocals.

== Background and promotion ==
The song's name was first revealed on January 5, 2022, when Canadian singer the Weeknd posted the track listing for the song's parent album Dawn FM (2022).

It was originally set to be sent to US rhythmic contemporary radio through XO and Republic Records on January 11, 2022, as the third single from the album until its release was canceled, with "Sacrifice", the second single of Dawn FM, being sent instead.

== Lyrics and composition ==
"I Heard You're Married" has been described as a synth-pop track where the Weeknd and Lil Wayne sing about the experience of being a side lover to a partner that is already married. The song runs for a duration of four minutes and twenty-four seconds.

== Critical reception ==
"I Heard You're Married" has received generally positive reviews. Some critics noted the song as a highlight on the record, with particular praise being given to the song's production. Mankaprr Conteh from Rolling Stone drew comparisons to Prince, saying the song's "smooth groove and splashy percussion" reminded him of the musical icon.

== Charts ==
Chart performance for "I Heard You're Married"
Chart (2022)	Peak position
Australia (ARIA)	56
Australia Hip-Hop/R&B Singles (ARIA)	21
Canada Hot 100 (Billboard)	24
France (SNEP)	124
Global 200 (Billboard)	33
Greece International (IFPI)	30
Iceland (Tónlistinn)	34
Lithuania (AGATA)	24
Portugal (AFP)	38
Slovakia (Singles Digitál Top 100)	96
South Africa Streaming (TOSAC)	70
Sweden (Sverigetopplistan)	83
UK Audio Streaming (OCC)	67
US Billboard Hot 100	62
US Hot R&B/Hip-Hop Songs (Billboard)	25
