= Here We Go... Again =

2022 song by the Weeknd featuring Tyler, the Creator

Song by the Weeknd featuring Tyler, the Creator

from the album Dawn FM
- Released: January 7, 2022
- Recorded: 2021
- Genre: Soft rock
- Length: 3:29
- Label: XO; Republic Records
- Songwriters: Abel Tesfaye; Tyler Okonma; Masamune Kudo; Bruce Johnston; Brian Kennedy; Benny Bock; Charlie Coffeen; Christian Love
- Producers: The Weeknd; Rex Kudo; Bruce Johnston; Brian Kennedy; Benny Bock; Charlie Coffeen

"Here We Go... Again" is a song by Canadian singer-songwriter the Weeknd featuring American rapper Tyler, the Creator. A track from the former's fifth studio album, Dawn FM (2022), it was written by the artists alongside Christian Love, Masamune "Rex" Kudo, Bruce Johnston, Brian Kennedy, Benny Bock, and Charlie Coffeen, the latter five producing it with The Weeknd.

== Background and release ==
Around six to eight months before the song's release, Bruce Johnston of the Beach Boys and Christian Love visited the house of the producer Rex Kudo. After Kudo sang with Johnston, the recorded vocals were played for the Weeknd, who liked it; Johnston got writing credits for the song. The harmonies sung by Johnston and Love were used in "Here We Go... Again".

The Weeknd first expressed interest in collaborating with Tyler, the Creator in an August 2021 interview with GQ, stating: "I got mad love for Tyler, the Creator, and what he's doing right now — he's somebody that I really admire, because he wears his feelings on his sleeve."

The Weeknd announced his fifth studio album, Dawn FM, on January 3, 2022, with Tyler, the Creator revealed as a feature on the album. The tracklist, which listed the song, was revealed on January 5, and the album was released on January 7.

== Music and lyrics ==
"Here We Go... Again" is a soft-rock ballad, with elements of alternative R&B. It is a beatless song supported by backing vocals, silky synths, and harmonies described as "gorgeous" by Vulture.

Thematically, the song contrasts Dawn FM's previous track, "Out of Time", which discusses themes of regret and trauma. In "Here We Go... Again", he decides to distract himself from these thoughts, instead singing about the successes he achieved in 2021, such as his appearances on Billboard's magazine covers and performance at the Super Bowl LV halftime show. However, his thoughts of fame and sex return to him, as people use him for it, but he is interested with the possibility of a real relationship developing from what was originally a short love affair. He also talks about an ex-lover, stating that although her friends attempt to pair her with somebody famous, she instead ends up with someone basic and faceless. He later claims that his new girlfriend is a movie star and that not only did he love her, he also made her 'scream like Neve Campbell'. In Tyler, the Creator's verse, he raps about how love may not be unconditional, warning his lover to sign a prenuptial agreement.

== Critical reception ==
Billboard placed the song as the third best from Dawn FM, describing its keyboards as "organ-like", and stating that it "exudes the spot of kitschiness" of 1980s songs. The Ringer's Rob Harvilla called the track "boorish", stating he did not like the song, but he "respected it". The Los Angeles Times' Mikael Wood called it one of the album's highlights, stating that it could be Dawn FM's most "idealistic cut", and calling the Weeknd's vocals "tender".

== Commercial performance ==
Following the release of Dawn FM, "Here We Go... Again" entered the Billboard Hot 100 at number 52 on the chart dated January 21, 2022, the seventh highest charting track.

== Personnel ==
Credits adapted from Pitchfork.

- Abel Tesfaye (The Weeknd) - lead vocals, production, composition, lyricist, keyboards, programming
- Tyler Okonma (Tyler, the Creator) - featured vocals, composition, lyricist
- Benny Bock - production, composition, lyricist, keyboards, programming
- Brian Kennedy - production, composition, lyricist, keyboards, programming
- Bruce Johnston - production, composition, lyricist, keyboards, vocal arrangement, vocals
- Charlie Coffeen - production, composition, lyricist, keyboards, programming
- Christian Love - composition, lyricist, background vocals
- Masamune "Rex" Kudo - production, composition, lyricist, keyboards, programming

=== Studio personnel ===
- Dave Kutch - mastering engineer
- John Hanes - mixing engineer
- Kevin Peterson - assistant mastering engineer
- Matt Cohn - engineering
- Michael Ilbert - engineering
- Serban Ghenea - mixing
- Shin Kamiyama - engineering

== Charts ==
Chart performance for "Here We Go... Again"
Chart (2022)	Peak position
Australia (ARIA)	46
Australia Hip-Hop/R&B Singles (ARIA)	17
Canada Hot 100 (Billboard)	21
France (SNEP)	83
Global 200 (Billboard)	26
Greece International (IFPI)	29
Portugal (AFP)	32
Slovakia (Singles Digitál Top 100)	64
South Africa Streaming (TOSAC)	42
Sweden (Sverigetopplistan)	72
UK Audio Streaming (OCC)	59
US Billboard Hot 100	52
US Hot R&B/Hip-Hop Songs (Billboard)	19
