= Gasoline (The Weeknd song) =

2022 song by the Weeknd

Song by the Weeknd

from the album Dawn FM
- Released: January 7, 2022
- Genre: Synth-pop; new wave
- Length: 3:32
- Label: XO; Republic
- Songwriters: Abel Tesfaye; Daniel Lopatin; Max Martin; Matt Cohn
- Producers: The Weeknd; OPN; Max Martin; Oscar Holter; Matt Cohn

Music video
- "Gasoline" on YouTube

"Gasoline" is a song by Canadian singer-songwriter the Weeknd, released as the second track from his fifth studio album, Dawn FM. A synth-pop and new wave track, the song was written by the Weeknd, OPN, and Matt Cohn, and produced by the three alongside Max Martin and Oscar Holter.

== Background and promotion ==
The song's name was first revealed on January 5, 2022, when Canadian singer the Weeknd posted the track listing for the song's parent album Dawn FM (2022). A music video for the song was announced on January 10, 2022, and then released the following day on January 11, 2022.

The song was originally intended to be released to US contemporary hit radio through XO and Republic Records on January 18, 2022, as the album's third single, but its release was cancelled.

In 2024, "Gasoline" served as the official theme song for WWE's WrestleMania XL, marking the fifth straight year in a row that a Weeknd song served as the theme song for the annual event, making the Weeknd the first artist to ever do so. It is also the third song from the Dawn FM album to be used as a WrestleMania theme, following the last two years' usage of "Sacrifice" and "Less than Zero" for 38 and 39 respectively.

== Lyrics and composition ==
"Gasoline" has been described as a synth-pop and new wave track where the Weeknd sings about an unbalanced relationship with a woman who is his crutch and support system for drug problems.

== Critical reception ==
"Gasoline" was met with critical acclaim, receiving particular praise for its production, melodies and The Weeknd's vocals. Craig Jenkins from Vulture drew comparisons of the song's vocal affectations and drum programming to the United Kingdom's '80s pop rap scene.

== Music video ==
A music video for the song was released on January 11, 2022. It was directed by Matilda Finn with visuals by cinematographer Jon Chema and expands on the story arc presented in the previous visuals released for the album.

The clip begins with an older version of the Weeknd getting into a car accident and then ending up in a nightclub where he finds a younger version enjoying himself on the dancefloor. This younger version of himself then walks around the club and sees corrupted versions of other dancers. During this, the younger version of the Weeknd sees his older self and begins to go straight to him. The clip then concludes with the younger version of the Weeknd brutally beating his older self, presumably to death.

== Charts ==
Chart performance for "Gasoline"
Chart (2022)	Peak position
Australia (ARIA)	28
Australia Hip-Hop/R&B Singles (ARIA)	9
Canada Hot 100 (Billboard)	27
Czech Republic Singles Digital (ČNS IFPI)	61
Denmark (Tracklisten)	33
France (SNEP)	58
Global 200 (Billboard)	14
Greece International (IFPI)	13
Iceland (Tónlistinn)	10
India International Singles (IMI)	13
Ireland (IRMA)	16
Italy (FIMI)	85
Lithuania (AGATA)	13
New Zealand Hot Singles (RMNZ)	6
Portugal (AFP)	20
Slovakia (Singles Digitál Top 100)	23
South Africa Streaming (TOSAC)	28
Sweden (Sverigetopplistan)	43
UK Audio Streaming (Official Charts)	32
US Billboard Hot 100	29
Vietnam (Vietnam Hot 100)	79

== Certifications ==
Region	Certification	Certified units/sales
Canada (Music Canada)	Platinum	80,000^{‡}
^{‡} Sales+streaming figures based on certification alone.
