= Dawn FM =

2022 studio album by the Weeknd

Studio album by the Weeknd
- Released: January 7, 2022
- Recorded: 2020–2021
- Studios: Henson (Los Angeles); Kudo (Los Angeles); Republic (Los Angeles); Westlake (Los Angeles); MXM (Los Angeles and Stockholm)
- Genres: Synth-pop; dance-pop; R&B
- Length: 51:49
- Labels: XO; Republic
- Producers: Benny Bock; Brian Kennedy; Bruce Johnston; Calvin Harris; Charlie Coffeen; DaHeala; Gitty; Max Martin; OPN; Oscar Holter; Peter Lee Johnson; Rex Kudo; Swedish House Mafia; Tommy Brown; The Weeknd

The Weeknd chronology
The Highlights (2021)	Dawn FM (2022)	Live at SoFi Stadium (2023)

Singles from Dawn FM
- 1. "Take My Breath" Released: August 6, 2021; 2. "Sacrifice" Released: January 7, 2022; 3. "Out of Time" Released: January 25, 2022; 4. "Less than Zero" Released: July 7, 2022

Dawn FM is the fifth studio album by Canadian singer and songwriter the Weeknd. It was released on January 7, 2022, by XO and Republic Records. The album contains guest appearances by Tyler, the Creator and Lil Wayne and narration by Jim Carrey, Quincy Jones, and Josh Safdie. Production was primarily handled by the Weeknd alongside a variety of producers, including Max Martin, OPN, Oscar Holter, Swedish House Mafia, and Calvin Harris, among others.

Dawn FM is a generally upbeat record containing dance-pop and synth-pop songs heavily inspired by 1980s new wave, funk, and electronic dance music. Conceptually, the Weeknd described the album as reflecting purgatory, while critics noted it explores psychedelic and existential themes. It is also the second instalment in a trilogy of albums, following After Hours (2020) and preceding Hurry Up Tomorrow (2025).

Dawn FM was supported by four singles—"Take My Breath", "Sacrifice", "Out of Time" and "Less than Zero"—with "Take My Breath" peaking at number six on the US Billboard Hot 100. The album opened with first-week sales of 148,000 album-equivalent units in the U.S. and debuted at number two on the Billboard 200. Internationally, it peaked at number one in 11 countries, including Australia, Canada, the Netherlands, Ireland, New Zealand, and the United Kingdom. Dawn FM received widespread acclaim from critics, with praise for its production, song structures, and melodies.

== Background and release ==
On March 20, 2020, the Weeknd released his fourth studio album After Hours during the beginning of COVID-19 restrictions. It was a commercial success and received mostly positive reviews from music critics, some of whom named it his best work yet. Shortly after, the Weeknd began working on his next studio album; in an interview with Rolling Stone in September 2020, he stated that he "might have another album ready to go by the time this quarantine is over." The Weeknd later explained that he was originally working on an album inspired by the depressive state he was in during the COVID-19 pandemic, but scrapped the project because it was "emotionally detrimental" and began working on Dawn FM.

The Weeknd began to tease a new album in May 2021 in an interview with Variety, when he stated "if the last record is the After Hours of the night, then The Dawn is coming". He continued to tease the album with the tentative title, The Dawn, during his acceptance speeches at the 2021 Billboard Music Awards and the 2021 iHeartRadio Music Awards. On August 2, the Weeknd released a teaser on his social media accounts titled "The Dawn Is Coming", which contained a snippet of a then-unreleased song. Later that day, in a partnership with NBC Sports and the 2020 Summer Olympics, he announced the album's lead single "Take My Breath", which was released on August 6. On October 4, 2021, during an episode of his Apple Music 1 radio show, Memento Mori, the Weeknd announced that the album was complete, and that he was waiting on a "couple characters that are key to the narrative." He then described the characters as "some people that are near and dear to me, some people that inspired my life as a child and some that inspire me now."

On January 1, 2022, the Weeknd teased a possible surprise release of the album in an Instagram post, which featured a screenshot of a text conversation he had with his best friend and creative director La Mar Taylor. After exchanging New Year's greetings, the Weeknd messaged that "Everything feels chaotic again. Music can heal and that feels more important than another album rollout. Let's just drop the whole thing and enjoy it with the people... XO." The next day, the Weeknd hinted at the album's arrival, tweeting "wake up at dawn tomorrow". On January 3, he announced the album's official title through a trailer video and announced that it would be released on January 7, 2022. He subsequently revealed the track listing through a second trailer on January 5. On January 11, the Weeknd announced an expanded edition of the album subtitled Alternate World including two remixes and previously released single "Moth to a Flame" with Swedish House Mafia.

== Composition ==
Who knows what the next one is going to sound like? When it comes to my albums, there is a cohesive sound going on, but I can't really stick to one style. So you'll hear EDM, hip-hop and three other types of sounds in one song – and somehow, we make it work.

— The Weeknd to Billboard in 2021

Dawn FM has been primarily described as pop, synth-pop, dance-pop, and R&B. Recalling 1980s electronic bands such as Depeche Mode and Duran Duran, the album significantly incorporates new wave, funk, and EDM, alongside elements of disco, electropop, hip hop, city pop, soft rock, psychedelia, blues, boogie, electro, and techno.

During an episode of Memento Mori, the Weeknd cited Britney Spears, Nas, Swedish House Mafia, Kid Cudi, Kanye West and Tyler, the Creator as the artists who have inspired the album. Influences of Michael Jackson's Off the Wall (1979) and Thriller (1982) are also present in Dawn FM.

=== Concept and themes ===
Dawn FM was noted for incorporating a "psychedelic radio" aesthetic with existential themes, similar to American experimental record producer Oneohtrix Point Never's album Magic Oneohtrix Point Never (2020), which the Weeknd appeared on and executive produced under his formal name. The "103.5" station tag that the album frequently uses is a nod to the Toronto radio station Z103.5, known for their dance-heavy playlists. In an interview with Billboard on November 23, 2021, the Weeknd elaborated on these themes, saying:

Picture the album being like the listener is dead. And they're stuck in this purgatory state, which I always imagined would be like being stuck in traffic waiting to reach the light at the end of the tunnel. And while you're stuck in traffic, they got a radio station playing in the car, with a radio host guiding you to the light and helping you transition to the other side. So it could feel celebratory, could feel bleak, however you want to make it feel, but that's what The Dawn is for me.

Further speculation on the album's concept arose following the Weeknd's announcement that Dawn FM was the second part of a trilogy of albums.

== Artwork ==
The standard and Alternate World editions' album cover of Dawn FM was shot by Matilda Finn. It features a "dramatically aged version" of the Weeknd as an elderly and overweight bearded man in a dark background setting with a small ray of light shining behind the back of his shoulder. The collector's and limited editions of the album, as well as the limited edition boxset CDs of the album, listed on the Weeknd's online store, feature five alternate Dawn FM covers designed by American artist Robert Beatty.

== Promotion ==
=== Singles ===
On August 6, 2021, the album's lead single, "Take My Breath", was released digitally on music stores and streaming services. The song peaked at number six on the US Billboard Hot 100 and reached the top ten in 21 other territories. Its music video was premiered alongside its release and was directed by Cliqua. An official remix by Italian house music group Agents of Time was released with the original version of the Alternate World edition of the album on January 11, 2022.

"Sacrifice" was released as the second official single in tandem with Dawn FM on January 7, 2022. Its music video was released on the same day, and was directed by Cliqua. The song was sent to contemporary hit radio in the United States on January 11, 2022.

"Out of Time" was released to American urban adult contemporary radio on January 25, 2022, as the third official single from the album. Its music video was released on April 5, 2022, and was directed by Cliqua. An official remix of the song by Haitian-Canadian music producer Kaytranada was released on April 22, 2022, and later included on the streaming reissue of the Alternate World edition of the album.

"Less than Zero" was given a limited single release in France, with it being sent to contemporary hit radio on July 7, 2022, as the album's fourth single in the country.

=== Promotional singles ===
On July 1, 2022, an official remix of the album's eleventh track "Starry Eyes" by Mike Dean was released as the first promotional single from the streaming re-issue of the Alternate World edition of Dawn FM.

An official remix of the album's title track by Oneohtrix Point Never was released as the second promotional single from the streaming re-issue of the Alternate World edition of the album on July 8, 2022.

On July 22, 2022, a remix of the album's third track "How Do I Make You Love Me?" by Swedish House Mafia members Sebastian Ingrosso and Salvatore Ganacci was released as the third promotional single from the streaming re-issue of the Alternate World edition of the album. Simultaneously, an animated music video for the original version of the song was released that same day. It was directed by Jocelyn Charles with some creative direction from Cliqua.

An official remix of the album's ninth track "Best Friends" with American R&B singer Summer Walker was released as the fourth and final promotional single of the streaming re-issue of the Alternate World edition of the album on August 5, 2022.

=== Other songs ===
A music video for the album's second track "Gasoline" was released on January 11, 2022. It was directed by Matilda Finn. On January 7, 2023, a music video for the album's tenth track "Is There Someone Else?" was released, as part of the one-year anniversary of the album's release. It was directed by Cliqua.

=== 103.5 Dawn FM livestream ===
On January 7, 2022, alongside the release of Dawn FM, the Weeknd hosted a live event with Amazon Music, in which he served as a disc jockey and played the entire album in front of a small crowd. The event was live-streamed on Twitch and was directed by Micah Bickham. Various different shots of the livestream were turned into lyric videos for the album. The whole livestream was uploaded to YouTube on January 12, 2022.

=== The Dawn FM Experience ===
On February 21, 2022, the Weeknd announced The Dawn FM Experience, a television music special with Amazon Prime Video that premiered on February 26. The special was directed by Micah Bickham and features live performances, theater and performance art for a "night out at the club." A ten-track live EP composed of the songs the Weeknd performed during the special was made available to stream exclusively on Amazon Music. The Dawn FM Experience entered the UK Albums Chart in March 2022, peaking at number 92.

=== Tour ===
Originally set to only support After Hours, the Weeknd announced on October 18, 2021, that his upcoming seventh concert tour would be renamed as the After Hours til Dawn Tour to incorporate elements from Dawn FM.

== Critical reception ==
Dawn FM ratings
Aggregate scores
Source	Rating
AnyDecentMusic?	8.4/10
Metacritic	88/100
Review scores
Source	Rating
AllMusic	4/5 stars
Evening Standard	4/5 stars
Exclaim!	9/10
The Guardian	5/5 stars
The Independent	4/5 stars
The Line of Best Fit	8/10
NME	4/5 stars
Pitchfork	8.0/10
Rolling Stone	4/5 stars
The Times	5/5 stars

Dawn FM was met with widespread acclaim from music critics. At Metacritic, which assigns a normalized rating out of 100 to reviews from professional publications, the album received an average score of 88, based on 24 reviews, indicating "universal acclaim". Aggregator AnyDecentMusic? gave it 8.4 out of 10, based on their assessment of the critical consensus.

Describing Dawn FM as a new peak for the Weeknd, Will Dukes of Rolling Stone praised the album for its "interstellar ambitions" and "enchanting music". Mikael Wood of the Los Angeles Times called it "the year's first great album", praising its production, melodies and vocals, while noting that Dawn FM is more positive and upbeat than his previous works. Andy Kellman of AllMusic praised the album, stating, "In the main, this is a space for Tesfaye to fully indulge his frantic romantic side as his co-conspirators whip up fluorescent throwback Euro-pop with muscle and nuance". Rhian Daly of NME said Dawn FM "feels like the first steps on a journey for the Weeknd to find peace with himself; perhaps next time we hear from him, he'll be fully embracing the light of day." Dani Blum from Pitchfork enjoyed and said the album conceptualizes "listening to a retro-pop radio station in purgatory", delivering the Weeknd's most "thoughtful, melodic, and revealing project" of his career. David Smyth of Evening Standard wrote the Weeknd reaches his "pop prime" on the album. Matt Mitchell of Paste opined that Dawn FM transcends "dynamic pop grandeur and flaunts accountability in the face of death".

Reviewing the album for Variety, Jem Aswad stated Dawn FM is "possibly the Weeknd's best and most fully realized album to date." Spin critic Bobby Olivier praised Max Martin for conferring a cohesive, "well-polished" production to the album, while still maintaining its "dexterity, punch and sex appeal." Roisin O'Connor of The Independent wrote the album is "a self-knowing contradiction to the Weeknd's past celebrations of impermanence via one-night stands and sleazy affairs." Writing for Clash, Alex Rigotti stated the album has "some pacing issues" and lacks "character and vivacity" of its predecessor, but nevertheless is a solid follow-up with "its dramatic instrumentation and refreshed view of the world." Fellow critic Tom Hull gave it a B+ and said that, while the singer's previous albums had been "increasingly sluggish", he has "found a beat here, and even his voice has brightened up."

=== Year-end lists ===
Select year-end rankings of Dawn FM
Critic/Publication	List	Rank	Ref.
Billboard	The 50 Best Albums of 2022	8	
Complex	The Best Albums of 2022	6	
Exclaim!	Exclaim!'s 50 Best Albums of 2022	27	
The Fader	The 50 Best Albums of 2022	9	
The Guardian	The 50 Best Albums of 2022	3	
The New York Times	Lindsay Zoladz's Best Albums of 2022	12	
Pitchfork	The 50 Best Albums of 2022	11	
Rolling Stone	The 100 Best Albums of 2022	37	
Slant Magazine	The 50 Best Albums of 2022	16	
Time Out	The 20 Best Albums of 2022	19	

=== Industry awards ===
Awards and nominations for Dawn FM
Year	Ceremony	Category	Result	Ref.
2022	American Music Awards	Favorite Pop/Rock Album	Nominated	
2022	Billboard Music Awards	Top R&B Album	Nominated	
2022	Polaris Music Prize	Polaris Music Prize	Longlisted	
2023	Juno Awards	Album of the Year	Won	
2023	Juno Awards	Pop Album of the Year	Won	

== Commercial performance ==
In the United States, Dawn FM debuted at number two on the Billboard 200 with 148,000 album-equivalent units, calculated from 173.04 million on-demand streams and 14,000 pure album copies; it was blocked from the top spot by American rapper Gunna's DS4Ever, which debuted with an extra 2,300 units that week. Dawn FM marked the Weeknd's eighth top 10 entry and his first studio album since Kiss Land (2013) to debut at number two.

The album logged two more weeks at its peak position of number two in spring 2022 following the distribution of its physical formats in February and May respectively, with it additionally being blocked by the soundtrack album of the 2021 American animated musical fantasy film Encanto and American rapper Future's I Never Liked You. In February 2022, the album would rise to a new peak of number one on the Billboard Top R&B/Hip-Hop Albums chart, making it his eighth number one project on the chart. In May 2022, the album would go on to break the record for the largest sales week for an R&B album on vinyl, with nearly 34,000 of its units for the chart week being vinyl. This record would be broken later by Silk Sonic's An Evening with Silk Sonic. Dawn FM was the fifteenth best-selling album of the year according to Hits, still according to the magazine, the album has moved a total of 980,000 album-equivalent units by the end of 2022, including 195,000 pure album sales, 87,000 song sales, 997 million audio-on-demand streams, and 49 million video-on-demand streams.

On July 17, 2023, Dawn FM was certified platinum by the Recording Industry Association of America (RIAA) for earning over a million album-equivalent units in the US.

In the United Kingdom, Dawn FM debuted at number one on the UK Albums Chart with over 20,000 units, becoming the Weeknd's third number-one album. It is the first album released in 2022 to top the chart. It also topped the Canadian Albums Chart of the Weeknd's home country, and nine other national album charts.

== Track listing ==
Standard edition
No.	Title	Writer(s)	Producer(s)	Length
1.	"Dawn FM"	Abel Tesfaye; Daniel Lopatin	The Weeknd; OPN; Max Martin^{[b]}; Oscar Holter^{[b]}	1:36
2.	"Gasoline"	Tesfaye; Lopatin; Martin; Holter; Matt Cohn	The Weeknd; OPN; Martin^{[a]}; Holter^{[a]}; Cohn^{[a]}	3:32
3.	"How Do I Make You Love Me?"	Tesfaye; Lopatin; Martin; Axel Hedfors; Steve Angello; Sebastian Ingrosso; Holter; Cohn	The Weeknd; OPN; Martin^{[a]}; Swedish House Mafia^{[a]}; Holter^{[a]}; Cohn^{[a]}	3:34
4.	"Take My Breath"	Tesfaye; Ahmad Balshe; Andrea Di Ceglie; Luigi Tutolo; Martin; Holter	The Weeknd; Martin; Holter	5:39
5.	"Sacrifice"	Tesfaye; Martin; Hedfors; Angello; Ingrosso; Carl Nordström; Holter; Kevin McCord^{[c]}	The Weeknd; Martin; Swedish House Mafia; Holter	3:08
6.	"A Tale by Quincy"	Tesfaye; Quincy Jones; Lopatin; Jeff Gitelman	The Weeknd; OPN; Martin; Gitty	1:36
7.	"Out of Time"	Tesfaye; Lopatin; Martin; Holter; Tomoko Aran^{[d]}; Tetsurō Oda^{[d]}	The Weeknd; OPN; Martin^{[b]}; Holter^{[b]}	3:34
8.	"Here We Go... Again" (featuring Tyler, the Creator)	Tesfaye; Tyler Okonma; Masamune Kudo; Bruce Johnston; Christian Love; Brian Kennedy; Benny Bock; Charlie Coffeen	The Weeknd; Rex Kudo; Johnston; Kennedy; Bock; Coffeen	3:29
9.	"Best Friends"	Tesfaye; Jason Quenneville	The Weeknd; DaHeala; OPN^{[b]}; Martin^{[b]}; Holter^{[b]}; Cohn^{[b]}	2:43
10.	"Is There Someone Else?"	Tesfaye; Lopatin; Martin; Thomas Brown; Peter Lee Johnson	The Weeknd; OPN; Tommy Brown; Johnson; Martin^{[b]}; Holter^{[b]}	3:19
11.	"Starry Eyes"	Tesfaye; Lopatin; Brown; Johnson	The Weeknd; OPN; Martin^{[b]}; Holter^{[b]}	2:28
12.	"Every Angel Is Terrifying"	Tesfaye; Lopatin; Cohn	The Weeknd; OPN; Cohn^{[b]}	2:47
13.	"Don't Break My Heart"	Tesfaye; Lopatin; Martin; Holter; Cohn	The Weeknd; OPN; Martin^{[a]}; Holter^{[a]}; Cohn^{[a]}	3:25
14.	"I Heard You're Married" (featuring Lil Wayne)	Tesfaye; Dwayne Carter; Adam Wiles; Lopatin	The Weeknd; Calvin Harris; OPN^{[b]}; Martin^{[b]}; Holter^{[b]}	4:23
15.	"Less than Zero"	Tesfaye; Martin; Holter	The Weeknd; Martin; Holter; OPN^{[b]}	3:31
16.	"Phantom Regret by Jim"	Tesfaye; Jim Carrey; Lopatin; Martin; Holter; Cohn	The Weeknd; OPN; Martin^{[a]}; Holter^{[a]}; Cohn^{[a]}	2:59
Total length:				51:49

Alternate World edition
No.	Title	Writer(s)	Producer(s)	Length
17.	"Moth to a Flame" (with Swedish House Mafia)	Tesfaye; Angello; Ingrosso; Nordström	Swedish House Mafia; Nordström	3:54
18.	"Dawn FM" (OPN remix)			3:03
19.	"How Do I Make You Love Me?" (Sebastian Ingrosso and Salvatore Ganacci remix)			3:37
20.	"Sacrifice" (remix; with Swedish House Mafia)	Tesfaye; Martin; Hedfors; Angello; Ingrosso; Nordström; Holter; McCord^{[c]}	The Weeknd; Martin; Swedish House Mafia; Holter	3:58
21.	"Out of Time" (Kaytranada remix)			4:35
22.	"Best Friends" (remix; with Summer Walker)			2:55
23.	"Starry Eyes" (Mike Dean remix)			3:18
24.	"Take My Breath" (single version)			3:40
Total length:				80:49

=== Notes ===
- ^{^[a]} signifies a co-producer
- ^{^[b]} signifies an additional producer
- Alternate World edition was initially featuring the remix of "Take My Breath" featuring Agents of Time and tracks 17 and 20. International editions also included track 24.
- Apple Music exclusive includes the music videos of "Gasoline", "Take My Breath", "Sacrifice" and "Moth to a Flame".

=== Sample credits ===
- ^{^[c]} "Sacrifice" contains an interpolation from "I Want to Thank You", written by Kevin McCord, and performed by Alicia Myers.
- ^{^[d]} "Out of Time" contains a sample from "Midnight Pretenders", written by Tomoko Aran and Tetsurō Oda, and performed by Aran.

== Personnel ==
Credits adapted from liner notes.

Musicians

- The Weeknd – vocals, keyboards, programming (all tracks); bass, drums (4); background vocals (15)
- OPN – keyboards, programming (1–3, 7, 10–13, 16)
- Jasper Randall – choir arrangement (1, 11, 12)
- Angela Parrish – choir vocals (1, 11, 12)
- Anna Davidson – choir vocals (1, 11, 12)
- Bri Holland – choir vocals (1, 11, 12)
- Jessica Rotter – choir vocals (1, 11, 12)
- Joanna Wallfisch – choir vocals (1, 11, 12)
- Katie Hampton – choir vocals (1, 11, 12)
- Rachel Panchal – choir vocals (1, 11, 12)
- Sara Mann – choir vocals (1, 11, 12)
- Sarah Margaret Huff – choir vocals (1, 11, 12)
- Jim Carrey – voice (1, 7, 16)
- Max Martin – keyboards, programming (2–7, 10, 11, 13, 15, 16); bass (4, 15), drums (4); background vocals, guitar (15)
- Oscar Holter – keyboards, programming (2–7, 10, 11, 13, 15, 16); bass (4, 15), drums (4), guitar (15)
- Elvira Anderfjärd – background vocals (4)
- David Bukovinszky – cello (4, 11)
- Shellback – drums (4)
- Magnus Sjölander – percussion (4)
- Mattias Bylund – strings (4, 11)
- Mattias Johansson – violin (4, 11)
- Quincy Jones – voice (6)
- Christian Love – background vocals (8)
- Benny Bock – keyboards, programming (8)
- Brian Kennedy – keyboards, programming (8)
- Bruce Johnston – keyboards, programming, vocal arrangement, vocals (8)
- Charlie Coffeen – keyboards, programming (8)
- Rex Kudo – keyboards, programming (8)
- DaHeala – keyboards, programming (9)
- Peter Noos Johansson – trombone (11)
- Josh Safdie – voice (12)
- Calvin Harris – keyboards, programming (14)
- Matt Cohn – keyboards (16), programming (2, 3, 9, 12, 13), vocal arrangement (3, 16); drums (2, 3, 12, 13)

Technical

- Dave Kutch – mastering
- Şerban Ghenea – mixing
- John Hanes – mix engineering
- Jeremy Lertola – engineering (1–3, 11, 14, 15)
- Matt Cohn – engineering (1–3, 6–16)
- Sam Holland – engineering (1–4, 6, 10, 11, 13–16)
- Shin Kamiyama – engineering (1–3, 5, 7–15)
- Michael Ilbert – engineering (8)
- Kevin Peterson – mastering assistance

== Charts ==
=== Weekly charts ===
Weekly chart performance
Chart (2022–2023)	Peak position
Argentine Albums (CAPIF)	7
Australian Albums (ARIA)	1
Austrian Albums (Ö3 Austria)	2
Belgian Albums (Ultratop Flanders)	2
Belgian Albums (Ultratop Wallonia)	4
Canadian Albums (Billboard)	1
Czech Albums (ČNS IFPI)	2
Danish Albums (Hitlisten)	2
Dutch Albums (Album Top 100)	1
Finnish Albums (Suomen virallinen lista)	1
French Albums (SNEP)	3
German Albums (Offizielle Top 100)	5
Greek Albums (IFPI)	14
Hungarian Albums (MAHASZ)	18
Icelandic Albums (Tónlistinn)	2
Irish Albums (Official Charts)	1
Italian Albums (FIMI)	4
Japanese Albums (Oricon)	49
Japanese Hot Albums (Billboard Japan)	41
Lithuanian Albums (AGATA)	1
New Zealand Albums (RMNZ)	1
Norwegian Albums (VG-lista)	1
Polish Albums (ZPAV)	4
Portuguese Albums (AFP)	3
Scottish Albums (Official Charts)	4
Slovak Albums (ČNS IFPI)	2
Spanish Albums (Promusicae)	2
Swedish Albums (Sverigetopplistan)	1
Swiss Albums (Schweizer Hitparade)	1
UK Albums (Official Charts)	1
UK R&B Albums (Official Charts)	1
US Billboard 200	2
US Top R&B/Hip-Hop Albums (Billboard)	1

=== Year-end charts ===
Year-end chart performance
Chart (2022)	Position
Australian Albums (ARIA)	10
Australian Hip Hop/R&B Albums (ARIA)	3
Austrian Albums (Ö3 Austria)	70
Belgian Albums (Ultratop Flanders)	29
Belgian Albums (Ultratop Wallonia)	41
Canadian Albums (Billboard)	10
Danish Albums (Hitlisten)	17
Dutch Albums (Album Top 100)	12
French Albums (SNEP)	22
German Albums (Offizielle Top 100)	74
Global Albums (IFPI)	15
Icelandic Albums (Tónlistinn)	13
Italian Albums (FIMI)	61
Lithuanian Albums (AGATA)	23
New Zealand Albums (RMNZ)	25
Portuguese Albums (AFP)	44
Spanish Albums (PROMUSICAE)	48
Swedish Albums (Sverigetopplistan)	48
Swiss Albums (Schweizer Hitparade)	30
UK Albums (OCC)	22
US Billboard 200	18
US Top R&B/Hip-Hop Albums (Billboard)	9

Year-end chart performance
Chart (2023)	Position
Australian Albums (ARIA)	79
Australian Hip Hop/R&B Albums (ARIA)	23
Belgian Albums (Ultratop Flanders)	112
Belgian Albums (Ultratop Wallonia)	134
French Albums (SNEP)	154
US Billboard 200	176
US Top R&B/Hip-Hop Albums (Billboard)	73

Year-end chart performance
Chart (2024)	Position
Australian Hip Hop/R&B Albums (ARIA)	47

== Certifications ==
Certifications
Region	Certification	Certified units/sales
Australia (ARIA)	Gold	35,000^{‡}
Austria (IFPI Austria)	Gold	7,500^{‡}
Belgium (BRMA)	Gold	10,000^{‡}
Canada (Music Canada)	3× Platinum	240,000^{‡}
Denmark (IFPI Danmark)	Platinum	20,000^{‡}
France (SNEP)	Platinum	100,000^{‡}
Italy (FIMI)	Platinum	50,000^{‡}
New Zealand (RMNZ)	Platinum	15,000^{‡}
Norway (IFPI Norway)	Gold	10,000^{‡}
Poland (ZPAV)	Platinum	20,000^{‡}
Portugal (AFP)	Gold	3,500^{‡}
United Kingdom (BPI)	Platinum	300,000^{‡}
United States (RIAA)	Platinum	1,000,000^{‡}
^{‡} Sales+streaming figures based on certification alone.

== Release history ==
Release history
Region	Date	Label(s)	Format(s)	Edition	Ref.
Various	January 7, 2022	XO; Republic	Digital download; streaming	Standard	
Various	January 11, 2022	XO; Republic	Digital download; streaming	Alternate World	
Various	January 28, 2022	XO; Republic	CD	Standard	
Japan	March 16, 2022	Universal Music Japan	CD; CD+DVD	Alternate World	
Various	April 29, 2022	XO; Republic	Cassette; LP	Standard	

== See also ==
- The Who Sell Out (1967) by the Who, framed as a pirate radio station broadcast
- FM! (2018) by Vince Staples, presented with skits from the radio show Big Boy's Neighborhood
