= How Do I Make You Love Me? =

- Remix cover

Song by the Weeknd

from the album Dawn FM
- Released: January 7, 2022
- Genre: Synth-pop
- Length: 3:34
- Label: XO; Republic
- Songwriters: Abel Tesfaye; Daniel Lopatin; Max Martin; Axel Hedfors; Steve Angello; Sebastian Ingrosso; Oscar Holter; Matt Cohn
- Producers: The Weeknd; OPN; Max Martin; Swedish House Mafia; Oscar Holter; Matt Cohn

Music video
- "How Do I Make You Love Me?" on YouTube

"How Do I Make You Love Me?" is a song by the Canadian singer-songwriter the Weeknd, and serves as the third track from his fifth studio album Dawn FM (2022). The song was written and produced by the Weeknd, OPN, Max Martin, Swedish House Mafia, Oscar Holter and Matt Cohn.

On July 22, 2022, the Weeknd released both an animated music video for "How Do I Make You Love Me?", and a remix created by Sebastian Ingrosso and Salvatore Ganacci.

== Background and promotion ==
The song's name was first revealed on January 5, 2022, when the Weeknd posted the track listing for his Dawn FM album.

On January 7, 2022, alongside the release of Dawn FM, the Weeknd hosted a live event with Amazon Music, in which he served as a disc jockey and played the entire album, including "How Do I Make You Love Me?", in front of a small crowd. Various different shots of the livestream were turned into lyric videos for the album.

== Music video ==
An animated music video for "How Do I Make You Love Me?" was released on July 22, 2022. It was directed by Jocelyn Charles with some creative direction from Cliqua.

=== Synopsis ===
The video's events take place after the video of another song from Dawn FM, "Out of Time", with a masked Tesfaye in a hospital. As Tesfaye attempts to escape while being held back by hospital staff, his arm is ripped out, before he jumps out of a window. After Tesfaye lands on the floor, a terrified driver runs him over as butterflies and insects fly out of his eyes. A large moth then appears and causes the pedestrians to go into flight by flapping its wings, before Tesfaye blows up a balloon version a himself, which engulfs the city. Tesfaye escapes through the sewage system, where he faces a demon-like creature and loses more of his limbs. He later is seen attempting to break into a woman's house, before his head falls off and his body is dismembered, revealing a child version of himself.

=== Reception ===
Rolling Stone called the video "nightmarish", further writing that the video had the "perfect ingredients for a nightmare," mentioning the giant moth and the dismemberment present in the video. Vibe wrote that the video is an exploration of "beauty behind the madness of love, life, mortality, and youth".

== Live performances ==
The Weeknd first performed "How Do I Make You Love Me?" in a television music special titled as The Dawn FM Experience, and its live performance was included on a ten-track EP which consisted of all the track he performed on the special, released exclusive on Amazon Music.

The song was performed again at the Coachella Valley Music and Arts Festival during the Weeknd's 2022 headlining set, and was later included as part of the set list for the Weeknd's After Hours til Dawn Tour.

== Charts ==
Chart performance for "How Do I Make You Love Me?"
Chart (2022)	Peak position
Australia (ARIA)	27
Australia Hip-Hop/R&B Singles (ARIA)	8
Austria (Ö3 Austria Top 40)	70
Canada Hot 100 (Billboard)	16
Czech Republic Singles Digital (ČNS IFPI)	59
Denmark (Tracklisten)	23
France (SNEP)	56
Global 200 (Billboard)	17
Greece International (IFPI)	9
Iceland (Tónlistinn)	7
India International Singles (IMI)	14
Italy (FIMI)	78
Lithuania (AGATA)	19
Netherlands (Single Top 100)	44
Norway (VG-lista)	31
Portugal (AFP)	21
Slovakia (Singles Digitál Top 100)	22
South Africa Streaming (TOSAC)	31
Sweden (Sverigetopplistan)	24
UK Singles (OCC)	22
UK Hip Hop/R&B (OCC)	9
US Billboard Hot 100	39
Vietnam (Vietnam Hot 100)	98

== Certifications ==
Certifications for "How Do I Make You Love Me?"
Region	Certification	Certified units/sales
Australia (ARIA)	Gold	35,000^{‡}
Brazil (Pro-Música Brasil)	Gold	20,000^{‡}
^{‡} Sales+streaming figures based on certification alone.
