= Is There Someone Else? =

Song by the Weeknd

from the album Dawn FM
- Released: January 7, 2022
- Genre: Synth-pop; synth-funk
- Length: 3:19
- Label: XO; Republic
- Songwriters: Abel Tesfaye; Daniel Lopatin; Thomas Brown; Max Martin; Peter Lee Johnson
- Producers: The Weeknd; Tommy Brown; Peter Lee Johnson; Oscar Holter

Music video
- "Is There Someone Else?" on YouTube

"Is There Someone Else?" is a song by Canadian singer-songwriter the Weeknd. Released as the tenth track on his fifth studio album, Dawn FM (2022), it was written by the Weeknd, OPN, Tommy Brown and Peter Lee Johnson, and produced by the four with additional production by Max Martin and Oscar Holter. The track peaked at number 45 on the UK Singles Chart and number 31 on the Billboard Hot 100.

On January 7, 2023, the one-year anniversary of Dawn FM, a music video for "Is There Someone Else?" was released. The Weeknd performed the song during his After Hours til Dawn Tour and included it on his 2023 live album, Live at SoFi Stadium.

== Composition and lyrics ==
"Is There Someone Else?" is composed in the key of A minor with a time signature of 4/4 (common-time), and follows a tempo of 135 beats per minute. The song's lyrics focus on Tesfaye's suspicion that his partner is having an affair with another man.

== Music video ==
A music video for the song was released on January 7, 2023, as part of the one-year anniversary of the album's release. It was directed by Cliqua.

=== Synopsis ===
The video begins with the Weeknd and a young woman entering an apartment, before the woman gives him a seductive strip tease, which he views through a window. From afar, the woman is being watched by another person from a telescope, who is revealed to be a masked version of the Weeknd. The ending of the video has the masked version of the Weeknd run to the apartment, after seeing the other version of himself with the woman, only to find no one inside the apartment.

== Charts ==
Chart performance for "Is There Someone Else?"
Chart (2022–2023)	Peak position
Australia (ARIA)	18
Australia Hip-Hop/R&B Singles (ARIA)	4
Canada Hot 100 (Billboard)	12
Czech Republic Singles Digital (ČNS IFPI)	79
Denmark (Tracklisten)	27
France (SNEP)	68
Global 200 (Billboard)	16
Greece International (IFPI)	2
Iceland (Tónlistinn)	14
India International Singles (IMI)	10
Italy (FIMI)	98
Lithuania (AGATA)	11
New Zealand Hot Singles (RMNZ)	4
Portugal (AFP)	18
Slovakia (Singles Digitál Top 100)	28
South Africa Streaming (TOSAC)	22
Suriname (Nationale Top 40)	24
Sweden (Sverigetopplistan)	41
UK Singles (OCC)	45
UK Hip Hop/R&B (OCC)	19
US Billboard Hot 100	31
US Hot R&B/Hip-Hop Songs (Billboard)	10
Vietnam (Vietnam Hot 100)	66

== Certifications ==
Certifications for "Is There Someone Else?"
Region	Certification	Certified units/sales
Australia (ARIA)	Platinum	70,000^{‡}
Brazil (Pro-Música Brasil)	Diamond	160,000^{‡}
Canada (Music Canada)	3× Platinum	240,000^{‡}
Denmark (IFPI Danmark)	Gold	45,000^{‡}
France (SNEP)	Gold	100,000^{‡}
Italy (FIMI)	Gold	50,000^{‡}
New Zealand (RMNZ)	Platinum	30,000^{‡}
Poland (ZPAV)	Gold	25,000^{‡}
United Kingdom (BPI)	Gold	400,000^{‡}
Streaming
Greece (IFPI Greece)	Gold	1,000,000^{†}
^{‡} Sales+streaming figures based on certification alone.^{†} Streaming-only figures based on certification alone.
