= Less than Zero (The Weeknd song) =

2022 single by the Weeknd

"Less Than Zero"

Single by the Weeknd

from the album Dawn FM
- Released: July 7, 2022
- Genre: Synth-pop; new wave
- Length: 3:32
- Label: XO; Republic
- Songwriters: Abel Tesfaye; Max Martin; Oscar Holter
- Producers: The Weeknd; Max Martin; Oscar Holter; Oneohtrix Point Never

The Weeknd singles chronology
| "Out of Time" (2022) | "Less Than Zero" (2022) | "Nothing Is Lost (You Give Me Strength)" (2022) |

"Less than Zero" is a song by Canadian singer and songwriter the Weeknd. It was released to French contemporary hit radio on July 7, 2022, as the fourth and final single from his fifth studio album Dawn FM (2022). The song was written by the Weeknd, Max Martin, and Oscar Holter, and produced by the three alongside Oneohtrix Point Never.

== Background and promotion ==
The song's name was first revealed on January 5, 2022, when Canadian singer the Weeknd posted the track listing for the song's parent album Dawn FM (2022). A lyric video for the song directed by Micah Bickham was released on January 9, 2022. It was also one of the songs performed in the television music special The Dawn FM Experience.

The song was given a limited single release in France, with it being sent to contemporary hit radio on July 7, 2022, in the country.

"Less than Zero" served as one of the two official theme songs for WWE's WrestleMania 39, marking the fourth straight year a song by the Weeknd served as the theme song for the annual event.

== Lyrics and composition ==
"Less than Zero" has been described as a slow-dance new wave and synth-pop track where the Weeknd sings about remaining regretful sentiments he has after the end of a relationship and how he blames himself. It is in the key of C major.

== Critical reception ==
"Less Than Zero" was met with widespread acclaim. Critics noted the song as a highlight on the record, with particular praise being given to the song's production, lyrics, its acoustic ending and The Weeknd's emotionally resonant vocals. Critics from Billboard noted that the song had the ability to potentially achieve the top 40 success that the singles from the Weeknd's previous After Hours had.

== Credits and personnel ==
Credits adapted from Tidal.

- The Weeknd – vocals, background vocals, songwriting, production
- Max Martin – guitar, keyboard, bass, background vocals, programming, songwriting, production
- Oscar Holter – guitar, keyboard, bass, programming, songwriting, production
- OPN - production
- Şerban Ghenea - mixing
- Dave Kutch – mastering
- Kevin Peterson – mastering
- Jeremy Lertola - engineering
- John Hanes - engineering
- Matt Cohn - engineering
- Sam Holland - engineering
- Shin Kamiyama - engineering

== Charts ==
Chart performance for "Less than Zero"
| Chart (2022) | Peak position |
|---|---|
| Australia (ARIA) | 47 |
| Australia Hip-Hop/R&B Singles (ARIA) | 18 |
| Canada Hot 100 (Billboard) | 32 |
| Canada CHR/Top 40 (Billboard) | 46 |
| Denmark (Tracklisten) | 33 |
| France (SNEP) | 82 |
| Global 200 (Billboard) | 24 |
| Greece International (IFPI) | 14 |
| Iceland (Tónlistinn) | 21 |
| India International Singles (IMI) | 16 |
| Lithuania (AGATA) | 30 |
| Portugal (AFP) | 39 |
| Slovakia (Singles Digitál Top 100) | 56 |
| South Africa Streaming (TOSAC) | 63 |
| Sweden (Sverigetopplistan) | 67 |
| UK Audio Streaming (Official Charts) | 57 |
| US Billboard Hot 100 | 53 |

== Certifications ==
Certifications for "Less than Zero"
| Region | Certification | Certified units/sales |
|---|---|---|
| Australia (ARIA) | Gold | 35,000^{‡} |
| Brazil (Pro-Música Brasil) | Gold | 20,000^{‡} |
| Canada (Music Canada) | Platinum | 80,000^{‡} |
| France (SNEP) | Gold | 100,000^{‡} |
| New Zealand (RMNZ) | Gold | 15,000^{‡} |
| United Kingdom (BPI) | Silver | 200,000^{‡} |
^{‡} Sales+streaming figures based on certification alone.

== Release history ==
| Region | Date | Format | Label(s) | Ref. |
|---|---|---|---|---|
| France | July 7, 2022 | Contemporary hit radio | Universal | |
