= Take My Breath =

2021 single by the Weeknd

Single by the Weeknd

from the album Dawn FM
- Released: August 6, 2021
- Studio: MXM (Los Angeles and Stockholm)
- Genre: Dance-pop; disco; funk; synthwave
- Length: 5:41 (album version); 3:40 (single/radio edit); 5:51 (extended mix)
- Label: XO; Republic
- Songwriters: Abel Tesfaye; Ahmad Balshe; Max Martin; Oscar Holter
- Producers: The Weeknd; Max Martin; Oscar Holter

The Weeknd singles chronology
"Better Believe" (2021)	"Take My Breath" (2021)	"Die for It" (2021)

Music video
- "Take My Breath" on YouTube

"Take My Breath" is a song by Canadian singer and songwriter the Weeknd. It was released on August 6, 2021, through XO and Republic Records, as the lead single from his fifth studio album, Dawn FM (2022). The song was written and produced by the Weeknd, Max Martin and Oscar Holter, with Belly receiving additional songwriting credits.

A disco, dance-pop, funk and synthwave track with psychedelic elements, "Take My Breath" was met with widespread critical acclaim for the Weeknd's vocals and its production, which was influenced by the beats and synthesizers of the 1980s. The song debuted at number six on the US Billboard Hot 100, marking the Weeknd's thirteenth top 10 entry.

== Background and promotion ==
The Weeknd first teased that he was working on a new album in September 2020, via an interview with Rolling Stone in which he stated "I might have another album ready to go by the time this quarantine is over". Later on during the 2021 Billboard Music Awards in May, he went on to state in his acceptance speech "I just want to say the After Hours are done and The Dawn is coming." Throughout June and July, the Weeknd continued to mention his upcoming project under the tentative title The Dawn by revealing a new transitional look. He also released the singles "You Right" with Doja Cat and "Better Believe" with Belly and Young Thug during that period.

On August 2, 2021, a snippet of "Take My Breath" with a visual of a sunrise titled "The Dawn Is Coming" and a GQ cover story was released in anticipation of new music. The title of the single and its release date of August 6 was confirmed later that day through a promotional video for the 2020 Summer Olympics, which featured hurdlers Sydney McLaughlin and Dalilah Muhammad, middle-distance runner Athing Mu and sprinter Gabrielle Thomas.

== Lyrics and composition ==
"Take My Breath" has been described by music critics as a disco, dance-pop, funk and synthwave track with elements of psychedelia. The single and radio version of the song runs for a duration of three minutes and forty seconds, while the extended version has a length of five minutes and fifty-one seconds. Also, the album version of the song runs for a duration of five minutes and thirty-nine seconds, which segues from the preceding track "How Do I Make You Love Me?". It was written in the key of C minor with a tempo of 121 beats per minute. Lyrically, the song details an entanglement in a romantic relationship that ultimately leads to autoerotic asphyxiation.

== Critical reception ==
"Take My Breath" received widespread critical acclaim. The vocals and production of the track received praise from Billboard's Joe Lynch, who compared the latter aspect's usage of a synthesizer to the synth riff that was used in Donna Summer's 1977 single "I Feel Love". Ben Beaumont-Thomas of The Guardian gave the song a five-star rating, stating that it is "an instant disco-pop masterpiece". Consequence of Sound writer Mary Siroky complimented "Take My Breath", "the music is pulsing, almost dizzying in its dance-floor intensity from start to finish, leaving the listener appropriately breathless". Chief critic Jon Pareles of The New York Times highlighted the record's retro appeal, "the disco thump, electric piano chords and call-and-response falsetto vocals in "Take My Breath" hark back to vintage Bee Gees. Journalist Quinn Moreland from Pitchfork complimented the intro and chorus, "from the strutting intro to the extremely infectious melody, "Take My Breath" is full of life".

=== Year-end lists ===
Publication	List	Rank	Ref.
Billboard	The 100 Best Songs of 2021	57	
CBC Music	The Top 100 Canadian Songs of 2021	2	
NME	The 50 Best Songs of 2021	13	

== Accolades ==
Awards and nominations for "Take My Breath"
Year	Organization	Award	Result	Ref(s)
2021	UK Music Video Awards	Best R&B/Soul Video – International	Nominated	

== Music video ==
The music video for "Take My Breath" was first teased by the Weeknd on social media via self-released images of the visual during the week leading up to the release of the single. Directed by Cliqua, it originally was supposed to play before IMAX showings of The Suicide Squad, but was reportedly pulled due to epilepsy concerns in regards to the pervasive strobe lighting in the video. The video was released alongside the song on August 6, 2021.

The video starts with the Weeknd walking outside overlooking a sunrise, before entering a nightclub with pulsating strobe lights. Upon entering the club, he meets his love interest, played by actress and stuntwoman Shaina West. The two dance together and exchange breaths through an oxygen tank, before the Weeknd's breath is literally taken away as he gets strangled by West's braids. The video ends with the Weeknd regaining his breath and consciousness as he is seen lying down on the club floor with a snippet of "Sacrifice" playing in the background. As of early 2022, the video has over 100 million views on YouTube.

== Use in media ==
"Take My Breath" was used as the theme song for WWE's 2021 pay-per-view Crown Jewel.

The song was included in the 2017 online video game Fortnite as a playable track in its "Fortnite Festival" mode, which the Weeknd headlined for its launch on December 9, 2023.

== Track listing ==
Digital single #1

1. "Take My Breath" – 3:40

Digital single #2 / CD maxi-single

1. "Take My Breath" – 3:40
2. "Take My Breath" (Instrumental) – 3:40
3. "Take My Breath" (Extended Version) – 5:51

== Personnel ==
- The Weeknd – songwriting, vocals, production, programming, keyboards, bass, drums
- Belly – songwriting
- Max Martin – songwriting, production, programming, keyboards, bass, drums
- Oscar Holter – songwriting, production, programming, keyboards, bass, drums
- Elvira Anderfjärd – background vocals
- David Bukovinsky – cello
- Shellback – drums
- Magnus Sjölander – percussion
- Mattias Bylund – strings
- Mattias Johansson – violin
- Sam Holland – engineering, studio personnel
- Şerban Ghenea – mixing, studio personnel
- Dave Kutch – mastering, studio personnel

== Charts ==
=== Weekly charts ===
Weekly chart performance for "Take My Breath"
Chart (2021–2022)	Peak position
Argentina Hot 100 (Billboard)	41
Australia (ARIA)	9
Austria (Ö3 Austria Top 40)	24
Belgium (Ultratop 50 Flanders)	4
Belgium (Ultratop 50 Wallonia)	3
Canada Hot 100 (Billboard)	3
Canada AC (Billboard)	5
Canada CHR/Top 40 (Billboard)	5
Canada Hot AC (Billboard)	3
Croatia International (HRT)	2
CIS Airplay (TopHit)	3
Czech Republic Airplay (ČNS IFPI)	11
Czech Republic Singles Digital (ČNS IFPI)	24
Denmark (Tracklisten)	7
Euro Digital Song Sales (Billboard)	5
Finland (Suomen virallinen lista)	11
France (SNEP)	17
Germany (GfK)	18
Global 200 (Billboard)	5
Greece International (IFPI)	5
Hungary (Rádiós Top 40)	2
Hungary (Single Top 40)	7
Hungary (Stream Top 40)	20
India International (IMI)	5
Ireland (IRMA)	11
Israel (Media Forest)	1
Italy (FIMI)	49
Japan Hot 100 (Billboard)	61
Lebanon (Lebanese Top 20)	2
Lithuania (AGATA)	10
Mexico Airplay (Billboard)	3
Netherlands (Dutch Top 40)	7
Netherlands (Single Top 100)	17
New Zealand (Recorded Music NZ)	12
Norway (VG-lista)	9
Panama (PRODUCE)	33
Poland Airplay (ZPAV)	4
Portugal (AFP)	11
Romania (Airplay 100)	50
Russia Airplay (TopHit)	3
San Marino (SMRRTV Top 50)	1
Singapore (RIAS)	17
Slovakia Airplay (ČNS IFPI)	14
Slovakia Singles Digital (ČNS IFPI)	10
South Africa Streaming (TOSAC)	16
Spain (Promusicae)	73
Sweden (Sverigetopplistan)	8
Switzerland (Schweizer Hitparade)	10
UK Singles (Official Charts)	13
US Billboard Hot 100	6
US Adult Contemporary (Billboard)	21
US Adult Pop Airplay (Billboard)	6
US Dance Airplay (Billboard)	9
US Pop Airplay (Billboard)	8
US Rhythmic Airplay (Billboard)	10
Vietnam (Billboard Vietnam Hot 100)	83

=== Year-end charts ===
2021 year-end chart performance for "Take My Breath"
Chart (2021)	Position
Belgium (Ultratop Flanders)	44
Belgium (Ultratop Wallonia)	31
Canada (Canadian Hot 100)	44
Croatia International Airplay (Top lista)	64
CIS (TopHit)	37
Denmark (Tracklisten)	92
France (SNEP)	159
Global 200 (Billboard)	146
Hungary (Rádiós Top 40)	98
Hungary (Single Top 40)	60
Hungary (Stream Top 40)	73
Netherlands (Dutch Top 40)	49
Netherlands (Single Top 100)	92
Poland (ZPAV)	55
Russia Airplay (TopHit)	38
Switzerland (Schweizer Hitparade)	85
US Billboard Hot 100	89
US Adult Top 40 (Billboard)	37
US Mainstream Top 40 (Billboard)	38

2022 year-end chart performance for "Take My Breath"
Chart (2022)	Position
Belgium (Ultratop 50 Flanders)	81
Canada (Canadian Hot 100)	43
Croatia International Airplay (Top lista)	7
Global 200 (Billboard)	181
Russia Airplay (TopHit)	100

Year-end chart performance
Chart (2025)	Position
Argentina Anglo Airplay (Monitor Latino)	89

== Certifications ==
Certifications for "Take My Breath"
Region	Certification	Certified units/sales
Australia (ARIA)	2× Platinum	140,000^{‡}
Brazil (Pro-Música Brasil)	Diamond	160,000^{‡}
Canada (Music Canada)	4× Platinum	320,000^{‡}
Denmark (IFPI Danmark)	Platinum	90,000^{‡}
France (SNEP)	Diamond	333,333^{‡}
Germany (BVMI)	Gold	200,000^{‡}
Italy (FIMI)	Platinum	100,000^{‡}
New Zealand (RMNZ)	Platinum	30,000^{‡}
Norway (IFPI Norway)	Platinum	60,000^{‡}
Poland (ZPAV)	Gold	25,000^{‡}
Portugal (AFP)	Gold	5,000^{‡}
Spain (Promusicae)	Gold	30,000^{‡}
United Kingdom (BPI)	Platinum	600,000^{‡}
United States (RIAA)	Platinum	1,000,000^{‡}
Streaming
Greece (IFPI Greece)	Gold	1,000,000^{†}
Sweden (GLF)	Platinum	8,000,000^{†}
^{‡} Sales+streaming figures based on certification alone.^{†} Streaming-only figures based on certification alone.

== Release history ==
Release history and formats for "Take My Breath"
Country	Date	Format	Label	Ref.
Various	August 6, 2021	Digital download; streaming	XO; Republic	
Australia	August 6, 2021	Contemporary hit radio	UMA	
Italy	August 6, 2021	Contemporary hit radio	Universal	
United States	August 7, 2021	Hot adult contemporary radio	XO; Republic	
United States	August 10, 2021	Rhythmic contemporary radio	XO; Republic	
United States	August 10, 2021	Contemporary hit radio	XO; Republic	
