= Out of Time (The Weeknd song) =

2022 single by the Weeknd

- Remix bundle cover

Single by the Weeknd

from the album Dawn FM
- Released: January 25, 2022
- Genre: R&B; city pop
- Length: 3:34
- Label: XO; Republic
- Songwriters: Abel Tesfaye; Daniel Lopatin; Tomoko Aran; Tetsurō Oda; Max Martin
- Producers: The Weeknd; OPN; Max Martin; Oscar Holter

The Weeknd singles chronology
"Sacrifice" (2022)	"Out of Time" (2022)	"Less than Zero" (2022)

Music video
- "Out of Time" on YouTube

"Out of Time" is a song by the Canadian singer and songwriter the Weeknd. It was released to American urban adult contemporary radio through XO and Republic Records on January 25, 2022, as the third single from his fifth studio album Dawn FM. The song was written and produced by the Weeknd and Oneohtrix Point Never; with Tomoko Aran and Tetsurō Oda receiving songwriting credits for the sampling of Aran's 1983 song "Midnight Pretenders". Max Martin and Oscar Holter received additional production credits. The track also features additional vocals from Jim Carrey, who provides narration throughout the album. The song also won an MTV Video Music Award for Best R&B Video in 2022.

== Background and promotion ==
"Out of Time" was released on January 7, 2022, alongside its parent album. It was sent to American urban adult contemporary radio on January 25 as the album's third single.

== Lyrics and composition ==
"Out of Time" has been described by critics as an R&B and city pop ballad with elements of boogie. The song is written in the key of C minor with a tempo of 93 beats per minute. Lyrically, the song details how the Weeknd's trauma from past relationships has negatively affected his ability to fix the romantic relationship he had with his former partner.

== Music video ==
The music video for "Out of Time" was released on April 5, 2022. Directed by Cliqua, it features actress and model HoYeon Jung, and continues a storyline made with the visuals from Dawn FM. Rolling Stone noted that many scenes within the visual are reminiscent of scenes from Sofia Coppola's Lost in Translation (2003).

=== Synopsis ===
In the video, the Weeknd and Jung meet in an empty hotel and quickly bond over singing the song in a karaoke box. They steal the karaoke machine and frolic around the hotel drinking, dancing, and singing the song. Towards the end, an older version of the Weeknd shown with a deformed appearance from the events of the video for "Gasoline" tries to reach out to his present self, before the video transitions to the Weeknd's older point of view in a surgery room, where Jim Carrey, narrating the final lines, puts a mask on him.

== Critical reception ==
"Out of Time" received critical acclaim. Critics praised the song for its production, lyrics, and vocals. Heran Mamo of Billboard named the track as the second-best song from the album, highlighting "The swirling flute and shimmering production feels like he's in a fairy tale where he can turn back time with just the snap of his fingers". A New University review called the song "one of the album's masterpieces".

== Track listing ==
- Digital download
1. "Out of Time" – 3:34
- Remix bundle
1. "Out of Time" (Kaytranada remix) – 4:35
2. "Out of Time" (Kaytranada remix; radio edit) – 2:35
3. "Out of Time" – 3:34
4. "Out of Time" (instrumental) – 3:34
5. "Out of Time" (video) – 3:53

== Charts ==
=== Weekly charts ===
Weekly chart performance for "Out of Time"
Chart (2022)	Peak position
Argentina Hot 100 (Billboard)	86
Australia (ARIA)	29
Australia Hip-Hop/R&B Singles (ARIA)	10
Canada Hot 100 (Billboard)	20
Canada CHR/Top 40 (Billboard)	17
Canada Hot AC (Billboard)	34
Czech Republic Singles Digital (ČNS IFPI)	90
Denmark (Tracklisten)	32
France (SNEP)	55
Global 200 (Billboard)	15
Greece International (IFPI)	12
Iceland (Tónlistinn)	17
India International Singles (IMI)	20
Italy (FIMI)	96
Japan Hot Overseas (Billboard Japan)	11
Lithuania (AGATA)	28
Netherlands (Single Top 100)	86
New Zealand Hot Singles (RMNZ)	5
Portugal (AFP)	16
San Marino (SMRRTV Top 50)	20
Slovakia (Singles Digitál Top 100)	90
South Africa Streaming (TOSAC)	29
South Korea (Gaon)	160
Sweden (Sverigetopplistan)	46
UK Audio Streaming (Official Charts)	42
US Billboard Hot 100	32
US Adult Contemporary (Billboard)	29
US Adult Pop Airplay (Billboard)	26
US Hot R&B/Hip-Hop Songs (Billboard)	11
US Pop Airplay (Billboard)	20
US R&B/Hip-Hop Airplay (Billboard)	43
US Rhythmic Airplay (Billboard)	15
Vietnam (Vietnam Hot 100)	15

=== Year-end charts ===
2022 year-end chart performance for "Out of Time"
Chart (2022)	Position
Canada (Canadian Hot 100)	83
US Hot R&B/Hip-Hop Songs (Billboard)	65
Vietnam (Vietnam Hot 100)	99

== Certifications ==
Certifications for "Out of Time"
Region	Certification	Certified units/sales
Australia (ARIA)	Platinum	70,000^{‡}
Brazil (Pro-Música Brasil)	Platinum	40,000^{‡}
France (SNEP)	Gold	100,000^{‡}
Italy (FIMI)	Gold	50,000^{‡}
New Zealand (RMNZ)	Platinum	30,000^{‡}
United Kingdom (BPI)	Silver	200,000^{‡}
United States (RIAA)	Platinum	1,000,000^{‡}
^{‡} Sales+streaming figures based on certification alone.

== Release history ==
Release history and formats for "Out of Time"
Country	Date	Format	Version	Label	Ref.
United States	January 25, 2022	Urban adult contemporary radio	Original	XO; Republic	
United States	March 28, 2022	Hot adult contemporary radio	Original	XO; Republic	
United States	March 29, 2022	Contemporary hit radio	Original	XO; Republic	
United States	March 29, 2022	Rhythmic contemporary radio	Original	XO; Republic	
Various	April 7, 2022	12-inch vinyl	Original	XO; Republic	
Various	April 22, 2022	Digital download; streaming	Remix bundle	XO; Republic	
Italy	April 22, 2022	Radio airplay	Original	Universal	
