= Tomoko Aran =

Japanese singer-songwriter (born 1958)

Tomoko Aran 亜蘭 知子
- Born: Tomoko Yoshiura; 14 January 1958 (age 68); Hirosaki, Aomori, Japan
- Genres: City pop
- Labels: Warner Pioneer; CBS/Sony
- Formerly of: Nagisa no All-Stars
- Website: tomokoaran.jugem.jp

Tomoko Yamaguchi (Japanese: 山口 智子, Hepburn: Yamaguchi Tomoko; née Yoshiura (吉浦); born 14 January 1958), known professionally as Tomoko Aran (亜蘭 知子, Aran Tomoko), is a Japanese singer-songwriter and book author. After starting her songwriting career in the late 1970s, she had released nine albums and eight singles for Warner Pioneer and CBS/Sony from 1981 to 1990. She returned to public attention in the 2010s amidst the rise of city pop to popularity.

== Biography ==
Tomoko Aran was born on 14 January 1958 in Hirosaki, Aomori Prefecture. During her youth, while listening to The Beatles, Elton John, and Cliff Richard, she gained an interest in music and songwriting. She made her songwriting debut when she was 19, and some of her work included music performed by Naomi Akimoto, B.B.Queens, B'z, Toshio Furukawa, Junko Mihara, Yoko Minamino, Tetsurō Oda, Takako Ōta, Kiyotaka Sugiyama, and Tube, as well as her own music.

In 1981, Aran released her first album, Shinkei Suijaku, as well as her first single "Kanashiki Vaudevillian". She went on to release eight more albums; her third one, Fuyū Kūkan (1983), was reportedly only known at the time it was released for using computer-generated imagery on its album cover. Akihiko Takeda said that her vocals, particularly in Fuyū Kūkan, "are an impressive mix of techno and dance pop". Another interesting aspect of Fuyū Kūkan is the covert art : it has been made with a supercomputer.

The Chūō Kōron said that "women living in the spotlight" was a recurring theme in her work. She was a founding member of the band Nagisa no All-Stars, and she was part of their 2006 reunion. She worked with the company Being, Inc.

Outside of music, Aran also worked as a media personality, including as a host of Beat Takeshi no TV Tackle, as well as in the radio shows Holiday Pops Inn, Mach Music Flight, and Aran Tomoko no Sabishigariya no Omocha Bako. She once wrote a short story collection named Tokai wa Sabishigariya no Omocha Bako (都会は淋しがりやのオモチャ箱), published in June 1985; a children's book named Sōshiki-gokko (葬式ごっこ), published by Obunsha in April 1999; and an essay book named Koi no Road Sign: Road Signs for Your Love (恋のロードサイン), published by Kobunsha in June 2003.

Although she reportedly received widespread recognition for her songwriting career, none of her musical releases were hits at first. However, she returned to public attention in the 2010s amidst the rise of city pop to popularity, with both the Manila Bulletin and Robert Moran of The Age considering her an icon in the genre, and her music appeared in several city pop music compilations. Two of the songs from Fuyū Kūkan, "Midnight Pretenders" and "I'm in Love", received a vinyl single release on 29 September 2021, and Fuyū Kūkan received a Super Audio CD re-release on 23 February 2022. Her song "Midnight Pretenders" was sampled on the Weeknd's 2022 song "Out of Time".

== Discography ==
=== Albums ===
Title	Year	Details	Peak chart positions	Sales	Ref.
Title	Year	Details	JPN	Sales	Ref.
Shinkei Suijaku (神経衰弱)	1981	Released: July 1981; Label: Warner Pioneer	—	—	
Shikisai Kankaku (色彩感覚)	1982	Released: 1982; Label: Warner Pioneer	—	—	
Fuyū Kūkan (浮遊空間)	1983	Released: 1983; Label: Warner Pioneer	—	—	
More Relax	1984	Released: 1984; Label: Warner Pioneer	—	—	
Imitation Lonely: Tokai wa, Sabishigariya no Omocha-bako (Imitation Lonely ―都会は、淋しがりやのオモチャ箱―)	1985	Released: 1985; Label: Warner Pioneer	—	—	
Last Good-bye	1986	Released: 1986; Label: Warner Pioneer	—	—	
Mind Games (stylized in all-caps)	1987	Released: 1987; Label: Warner Pioneer	—	—	
Stay In My Eyes (ステイ・イン・マイ・アイズ)	1988	Released: 21 November 1988; Label: CBS/Sony	—	—	
Sunny Side Memories (stylized in all-caps)	1990	Released: 21 April 1990; Label: CBS/Sony	—	—	

=== Singles ===
Title	Year	Details	Peak chart positions	Sales	Ref.
Title	Year	Details	JPN	Sales	Ref.
"Kanashiki Vaudevillian/Yōsai no Onna-tachi" (悲しきボードビリアン/So Get Up (要塞の女たち))	1981	Released: 1981; Label: Warner Pioneer	—	—	
"Body to Body/Hito Natsu no Tapestry (Tapestry)" (Body to Body/ひと夏のタペストリー (Tapestry))	1983	Released: 1983; Label: Warner Pioneer	—	—	
"Drive To Love (Ai no Umi e)/Mō Ichido South Wind" (Drive To Love (愛の海へ)/もう一度South Wind)	1984	Released: 1984; Label: Warner Pioneer	—	—	
"Love Connection (Shitataka ni Woman)/Kanashimi no Sing" (Love Connection (したたかにWoman)/哀しみのSing)	1985	Released: 1985; Label: Warner Pioneer	—	—	
"Till The End Of The World/Rain"	1986	Released: 1986; Label: Warner Pioneer	—	—	
"Wait Forever/One And Only"	1988	Released: 1988; Label: CBS/Sony	—	—	
"Aki/Je t'aime Kimama ni" (秋/Je t'aime 気ままに...)	1989	Released: 1989; Label: CBS/Sony	—	—	
"Everything/Nichiyōbi no Scat" (Everything/日曜日のスキャット)	1990	Released: 1 February 1990; Label: CBS/Sony	—	—	
"Midnight Pretenders/I'm in Love"	2021	Released: 29 September 2021; Label: Warner Music Japan	—	—	

== Songwriting credits ==
- "Let's Go Seishun" (1980, theme song of Go Go! Cheer Girl) by Junko and Cheer Leader
- "Sexy Night" (1980) by Junko Mihara
- "Drum" (1981) by Junko Mihara
- "Lonely Chaser" (1984, Chō Kōsoku Galvion opening theme) by Riyuko Tanaka
- "Memory Lullaby" (1984, Chō Kōsoku Galvion ending theme) by Riyuko Tanaka
- "Season in the Sun" (1986) by Tube
- "Summer Dream" (1987) by Tube
- "Nothing To Change" (1988) by B'z
- "Private Panic" (1989, Magical Chinese Girl Paipai! insert song) by Natsuki Ozawa
- "Yume Ippai" (1990, Chibi Maruko-chan theme song) by Yumiko Seki
