= Sacrifice (The Weeknd song) =

2022 single by the Weeknd

Single by the Weeknd

from the album Dawn FM
- Released: January 7, 2022
- Recorded: 2020–2021
- Studio: MXM (Los Angeles and Stockholm)
- Genre: Post-disco; electro; funk; disco
- Length: 3:09
- Label: XO; Republic
- Songwriters: Abel Tesfaye; Max Martin; Axel Hedfors; Steve Angello; Sebastian Ingrosso; Carl Nordström; Oscar Holter; Kevin McCord
- Producers: The Weeknd; Max Martin; Swedish House Mafia; Oscar Holter

The Weeknd singles chronology
"Poison" (2021)	"Sacrifice" (2022)	"Out of Time" (2022)

Music video
- "Sacrifice" on YouTube

"Sacrifice" is a song by Canadian singer and songwriter the Weeknd. It was released on January 7, 2022, through XO and Republic Records, alongside his fifth studio album, Dawn FM, as that album's second single. The song was written by the Weeknd, Max Martin, Oscar Holter, Swedish House Mafia, & Carl Nordström and produced by the former four, with Kevin McCord receiving songwriting credits for the sampling of the 1981 track "I Want to Thank You", performed by Alicia Myers.

== Background and promotion ==
At the end of the Weeknd's music video for Dawn FM's lead single "Take My Breath", a snippet of "Sacrifice" is heard. It was released alongside its parent album on January 7, 2022, and was sent to American contemporary hit radio stations on January 11 as the second single from the album. In 2022, "Sacrifice" served as the official theme song for WWE's WrestleMania 38, marking the third straight year in a row that a Weeknd song served as the theme song for the annual event. It is also the first song from the Dawn FM album to be used as a WrestleMania theme.

== Lyrics and composition ==
"Sacrifice" has been described by music critics as a post-disco and electro track that details the Weeknd's hedonistic lifestyle.

== Critical reception ==
Critics noted "Sacrifice" as being a standout track from the album, with the Weeknd's vocals and production being highlighted. Mankaprr Conteh from Rolling Stone compared the Weeknd's performance on the song to that of Michael Jackson's on his 1983 single "Wanna Be Startin' Somethin'" and his 1979 single "Don't Stop 'Til You Get Enough", putting emphasis on the similar sounding vocal melodies and guitar riffs. Heran Mamo of Billboard agreed, adding that the song is "the closest thing to a Michael Jackson record in the 21st century," claiming that it "resurrects the period-appropriate disco-funk". Mary Siroky in her review for Consequence of Sound highlighted that the song "is more of the irresistible fare for which The Weeknd has become known", praising his "wavy vocals" that "sound right at home here" and the production for being "bouncy and bright, making 'Sacrifice' stand out in an album packed with earworms."

The song won the Juno Award for Single of the Year at the Juno Awards of 2023.

== Music video ==
The music video for "Sacrifice", directed by Cliqua, was released alongside the song and parent album on January 7, 2022, and serves as the sequel to the music video of "Take My Breath". It begins with the Weeknd, who is dazed and confused, being brought towards a theoretical light at the end of a tunnel; while a snippet of Dawn FM's title track, featuring narration by actor Jim Carrey, is played in the background. He then wakes up out of breath as a result of the events that occurred in the "Take My Breath" music video. As he tries to catch his breath, he is abducted by a hooded cult and tied to a wheel-like contraption to be used for a human sacrifice. As the cult members gather around him, a veiled female figure in a red cloak appears and takes his soul away. A series of psychedelic-hued visuals, strobe lighting and dance numbers are then showcased. The Weeknd is then seen singing into a microphone while holding the stand with metal gauntlets. As the sacrifice continues, his hands become horrifically scarred, with the red-cloaked female having stolen his youth. The Weeknd is then seen giving his own variation of Michael Jackson's foot shuffle before the cult members disperse and The Weeknd tumbles out in a fading shot.

== Credits and personnel ==
- The Weeknd – vocals, songwriting, production, programming, keyboards
- Max Martin – songwriting, production, programming, keyboards
- Oscar Holter – songwriting, production, programming, keyboards
- Swedish House Mafia – production
  - Axel Hedfors – songwriting
  - Steve Angello – songwriting
  - Sebastian Ingrosso – songwriting
- Carl Nordström – songwriting
- Kevin Duane McCord – songwriting
- Serban Ghenea – mixing
- John Hanes – mix engineering
- Dave Kutch – mastering
- Kevin Peterson – assistant mixing
- Shin Kamiyama – engineering

== Charts ==
=== Weekly charts ===
Weekly chart performance for "Sacrifice"
Chart (2022)	Peak position
Argentina Hot 100 (Billboard)	65
Australia (ARIA)	9
Australia Hip-Hop/R&B Singles (ARIA)	2
Austria (Ö3 Austria Top 40)	27
Belgium (Ultratop 50 Flanders)	8
Belgium (Ultratop 50 Wallonia)	2
Brazil (Top 100 Brasil)	7
Canada Hot 100 (Billboard)	9
Canada AC (Billboard)	14
Canada CHR/Top 40 (Billboard)	9
Canada Hot AC (Billboard)	7
Croatia International (HRT)	1
Czech Republic Airplay (ČNS IFPI)	6
Czech Republic Singles Digital (ČNS IFPI)	27
Denmark (Tracklisten)	12
Euro Digital Song Sales (Billboard)	15
Finland (Suomen virallinen lista)	7
France (SNEP)	21
Germany (GfK)	27
Global 200 (Billboard)	2
Greece International (IFPI)	1
Hungary (Rádiós Top 40)	34
Hungary (Single Top 40)	19
Hungary (Stream Top 40)	20
Iceland (Tónlistinn)	5
India International Singles (IMI)	7
Ireland (IRMA)	5
Italy (FIMI)	38
Japan Hot 100 (Billboard)	85
Lebanon (Lebanese Top 20)	11
Lithuania (AGATA)	3
Malaysia (RIM)	17
Mexico Airplay (Billboard)	10
Netherlands (Dutch Top 40)	10
Netherlands (Single Top 100)	15
New Zealand (Recorded Music NZ)	22
Norway (VG-lista)	7
Portugal (AFP)	6
San Marino (SMRRTV Top 50)	5
Singapore (RIAS)	15
Slovakia Airplay (ČNS IFPI)	31
Slovakia Singles Digital (ČNS IFPI)	9
South Africa Streaming (TOSAC)	17
South Korea (Gaon)	194
Spain (Promusicae)	68
Sweden (Sverigetopplistan)	5
Switzerland (Schweizer Hitparade)	13
UK Singles (Official Charts)	10
UK Hip Hop/R&B (Official Charts)	4
US Billboard Hot 100	11
US Adult Contemporary (Billboard)	23
US Adult Pop Airplay (Billboard)	16
US Dance Airplay (Billboard)	6
US Hot R&B/Hip-Hop Songs (Billboard)	3
US Pop Airplay (Billboard)	13
US Rhythmic Airplay (Billboard)	13
Vietnam (Vietnam Hot 100)	22

=== Year-end charts ===
2022 year-end chart performance for "Sacrifice"
Chart (2022)	Position
Belgium (Ultratop 50 Flanders)	53
Belgium (Ultratop 50 Wallonia)	15
Canada (Canadian Hot 100)	52
Croatia (HRT)	50
France (SNEP)	97
Global 200 (Billboard)	190
Netherlands (Dutch Top 40)	77
US Hot R&B/Hip-Hop Songs (Billboard)	50

== Certifications ==
Certifications for "Sacrifice"
Region	Certification	Certified units/sales
Australia (ARIA)	Platinum	70,000^{‡}
Belgium (BRMA)	Gold	20,000^{‡}
Brazil (Pro-Música Brasil)	3× Platinum	120,000^{‡}
Canada (Music Canada)	2× Platinum	160,000^{‡}
Denmark (IFPI Danmark)	Gold	45,000^{‡}
France (SNEP)	Diamond	333,333^{‡}
Italy (FIMI)	Platinum	100,000^{‡}
New Zealand (RMNZ)	Gold	15,000^{‡}
Poland (ZPAV)	Gold	25,000^{‡}
Spain (Promusicae)	Gold	30,000^{‡}
United Kingdom (BPI)	Gold	400,000^{‡}
Streaming
Sweden (GLF)	Gold	4,000,000^{†}
^{‡} Sales+streaming figures based on certification alone.^{†} Streaming-only figures based on certification alone.

== Release history ==
Release history and formats for "Sacrifice"
Country	Date	Format	Label	Ref.
France	January 7, 2022	Radio airplay	XO; Republic	
Italy	January 7, 2022	Radio airplay	Universal	
United States	January 11, 2022	Contemporary hit radio	XO; Republic	
United States	January 11, 2022	Rhythmic contemporary radio	XO; Republic	
