= Oscar Holter =

Swedish record producer and songwriter (born 1986)

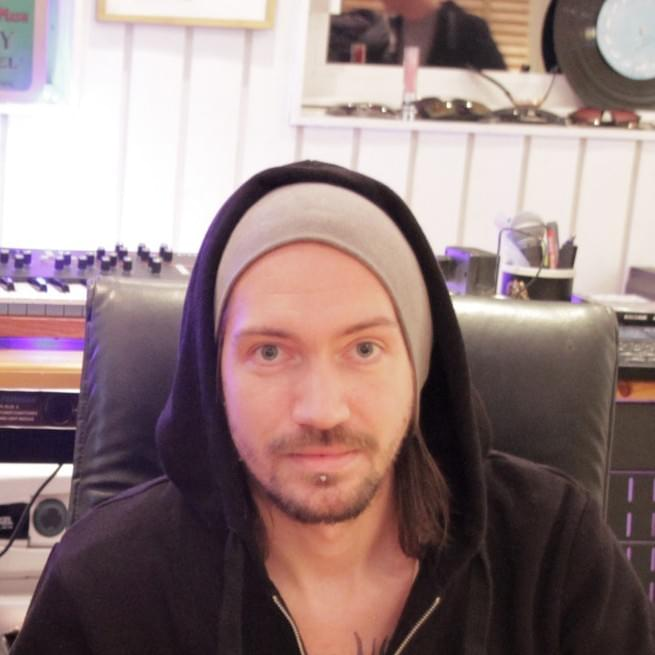
- Holter in 2014

Background information
- Born: Oscar Thomas Holter; 26 February 1986 (age 40); Degerfors, Sweden
- Genres: Pop; dream pop; futurepop; EBM
- Occupations: Record producer; songwriter
- Years active: 2005–present

Oscar Thomas Holter (born 26 February 1986) is a Swedish record producer and songwriter based in the United States. He is best known for his work with record producer and fellow Swede Max Martin and Canadian singer-songwriter the Weeknd on the 2019 single "Blinding Lights", which became the longest-charting Hot 100 song and the #1 greatest song of all time according to the Billboard Hot 100. Holter has written and produced songs with the likes of Katy Perry, Taylor Swift, Marina, Tove Lo, Charli XCX, DNCE, Hailee Steinfeld, Carly Rae Jepsen, Cher Lloyd, Christina Aguilera, Adam Lambert, and Troye Sivan. He is also a former member of the EBM band Necro Facility.

== Songwriting and production credits ==
Title	Year	Artist(s)	Album	Credits
"Pio Konta"	2009	Kostas Martakis	Pio Konta	Co-writer/Co-producer
"Pote"	2009	Kostas Martakis	Pio Konta	Co-writer/Co-producer
"Kano Oti Thes"	2009	Kostas Martakis	Pio Konta	Co-writer/Co-producer
"I Agapi Ine Edo"	2009	Kostas Martakis	Pio Konta	Co-writer/Co-producer
"Dance on Me"	2009	Kostas Martakis	Pio Konta	Co-writer/Co-producer
"Love Me Like You Hate Me"	2010	Tone Damli	Cocool	Co-writer
"Lightbringer" (featuring Necro Facility)	2011	Covenant	Modern Ruin	Co-writer/Co-producer
"This Time Love Is For Real"	2011	Sanna Nielsen	I'm in Love	Co-writer
"Take Me Home"	2011	Sanna Nielsen	I'm in Love	Co-writer
"Let There Be Love"	2012	Christina Aguilera	Lotus	Co-writer
"Free World"	2013	Miyavi	Miyavi	Co-producer
"Alone With Me"	2014	Cher Lloyd	Sorry I'm Late	Co-writer/Producer
"A Town Called Paradise" (featuring Zac Barnett)	2014	Tiësto	A Town Called Paradise	Co-producer
"Let's Go" (featuring Icona Pop)	2014	Tiësto	A Town Called Paradise	Co-writer/Co-producer
"Should've Been Us"	2015	Tori Kelly	Unbreakable Smile	Co-writer/Co-producer
"Evil in The Night"	2015	Adam Lambert	The Original High	Co-writer/Co-producer
"Things I Didn't Say"	2015	Adam Lambert	The Original High	Co-writer/Co-producer
"Lies"	2015	Hilary Duff	Breathe In. Breathe Out.	Co-writer/Co-producer
"Run Away with Me"	2015	Carly Rae Jepsen	E-MO-TION	Co-writer
"Jinx"	2015	DNCE	Swaay EP	Co-writer
"Love Myself"	2015	Hailee Steinfeld	Haiz	Co-writer/Co-producer
"You're Such A"	2015	Hailee Steinfeld	Haiz	Co-producer
"Rock Bottom" (solo / featuring DNCE)	2015	Hailee Steinfeld	Haiz	Co-producer
"Hell Nos and Headphones"	2015	Hailee Steinfeld	Haiz	Co-producer
"Just Like Fire"	2016	Pink	Alice Through the Looking Glass: Original Movie Soundtrack	Co-writer/Co-producer
"Hair Up" (with Gwen Stefani & Ron Funches)	2016	Justin Timberlake	Trolls: Original Movie Soundtrack	Co-writer/Co-producer
"Fuck Apologies" (featuring Wiz Khalifa)	2016	JoJo	Mad Love	Co-writer/Co-producer
"Lady Wood"	2016	Tove Lo	Lady Wood	Co-writer/Co-producer
"True Disaster"	2016	Tove Lo	Lady Wood	Co-writer/Producer
"Doctor You"	2016	DNCE	DNCE	Co-writer/Co-producer
"Blown" (featuring Kent Jones)	2016	DNCE	DNCE	Co-writer/Co-producer
"Be Mean"	2016	DNCE	DNCE	Co-writer/Co-producer
"Breathe"	2017	Astrid S	Party's Over	Co-writer/Producer
"Bon Appétit" (featuring Migos)	2017	Katy Perry	Witness	Co-writer/Producer
"Secrets"	2017	Pink	Beautiful Trauma	Co-writer/Producer
"Dancing With Our Hands Tied"	2017	Taylor Swift	Reputation	Co-writer/Producer
"Bloom"	2018	Troye Sivan	Bloom	Co-writer/Producer
"Dance to This" (featuring Ariana Grande)	2018	Troye Sivan	Bloom	Co-writer/Producer
"1999" (with Troye Sivan)	2018	Charli XCX	Charli	Co-writer/Producer
"Timebomb"	2019	Walk the Moon	Non-album single	Co-writer/Producer
"Don't Feel Like Crying"	2019	Sigrid	Sucker Punch	Co-writer/Producer
"Enjoy Your Life"	2019	Marina	Love + Fear	Co-writer/Co-producer
"True"	2019	Marina	Love + Fear	Co-writer
"Blinding Lights"	2019	The Weeknd	After Hours	Co-writer/Co-producer
"In Your Eyes"	2020	The Weeknd	After Hours	Co-writer/Co-producer
"Hardest to Love"	2020	The Weeknd	After Hours	Co-writer/Co-producer
"Scared to Live"	2020	The Weeknd	After Hours	Co-writer/Co-producer
"Save Your Tears"	2020	The Weeknd	After Hours	Co-writer/Co-producer
"Cry About It Later"	2020	Katy Perry	Smile	Co-writer/Co-producer
"Higher Power"	2021	Coldplay	Music of the Spheres	Co-writer/Co-producer
"Coloratura"	2021	Coldplay	Music of the Spheres	Co-writer/Co-producer
"My Universe"	2021	Coldplay and BTS	Music of the Spheres	Co-writer/Co-producer
"Take My Breath"	2021	The Weeknd	Dawn FM	Co-writer/Co-producer
"How Do I Make You Love Me?"	2022	The Weeknd	Dawn FM	Co-writer/Co-producer
"Sacrifice"	2022	The Weeknd	Dawn FM	Co-writer/Co-producer
"Don't Break My Heart"	2022	The Weeknd	Dawn FM	Co-writer/Co-producer
"Less than Zero"	2022	The Weeknd	Dawn FM	Co-writer/Co-producer
"Gasoline"	2022	The Weeknd	Dawn FM	Co-producer
"Out of Time"	2022	The Weeknd	Dawn FM	Co-producer
"Best Friends"	2022	The Weeknd	Dawn FM	Co-producer
"Starry Eyes"	2022	The Weeknd	Dawn FM	Co-producer
"I Heard You're Married" (featuring Lil Wayne)	2022	The Weeknd	Dawn FM	Co-producer
"Good Ones"	2022	Charli XCX	Crash	Co-writer/Producer
"The Astronaut"	2022	Jin	Non-album single	Additional producer
"Spaceman"	2022	MØ	Motordrome (The Dødsdrom Edition)	Co-writer/Producer
"Change"	2022	Skip Marley	Non-album single	Co-writer/Producer
"Over"	2023	Chvrches	Non-album single	Co-writer/Producer
"Leave Me Slowly"	2023	Lewis Capaldi	Broken by Desire to Be Heavenly Sent	Co-writer
"Give Me Mercy"	2025	The Weeknd	Hurry Up Tomorrow	Co-writer/Co-producer
"Open Hearts"	2025	The Weeknd	Hurry Up Tomorrow	Co-writer/Co-producer
"Runaway"	2025	The Weeknd	Hurry Up Tomorrow	Co-writer/Co-producer
"Society"	2025	The Weeknd	Hurry Up Tomorrow	Co-writer/Co-producer
"Without a Warning"	2025	The Weeknd	Hurry Up Tomorrow	Co-writer/Co-producer
"Talk To Me"	2026	Robyn	Sexistential	Co-writer/Co-producer
