= The Weeknd =

Canadian singer and songwriter (born 1990)

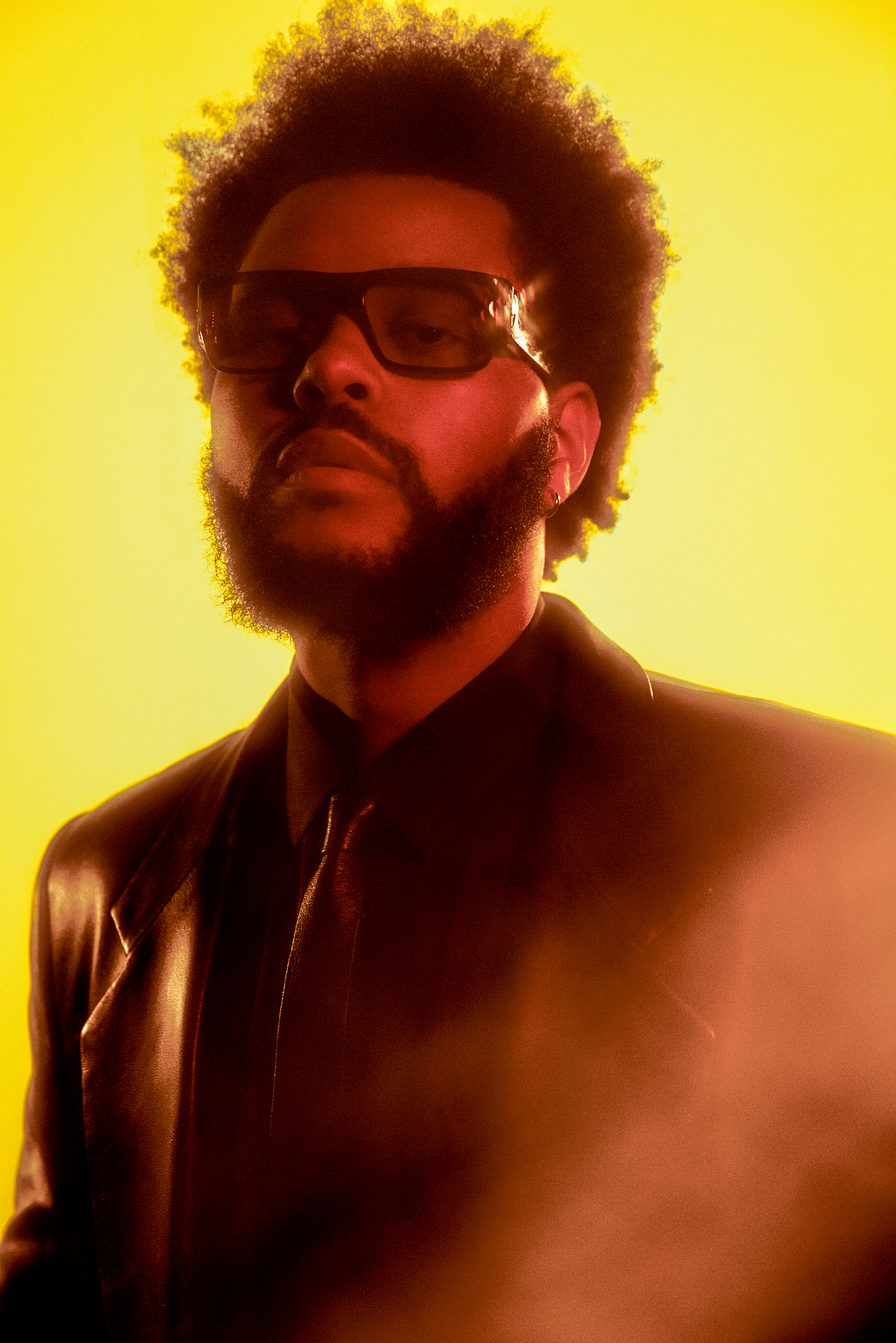
- Tesfaye in 2021
- Born: Abel Makkonen Tesfaye; February 16, 1990 (age 36); Metropolitan Toronto, Ontario, Canada
- Other name: Kin Kane • Gene Hackerman
- Occupations: Singer; songwriter; record producer; actor
- Years active: 2009–present
- Works: Discography; songs recorded; videography
- Awards: Full list
- Musical career
- Genres: R&B; pop
- Instruments: Vocals; keyboards
- Labels: XO; Republic
- Publisher: Universal Music Publishing Group
- Formerly of: The Noise; Bulleez n Nerdz
- Website: theweeknd.com

Abel Tesfaye (Note: Amharic: አቤል ተስፋዬ) (born Abel Makkonen Tesfaye; (Note: Amharic: አቤል መኮንን ተስፋዬ) February 16, 1990), known by his stage name the Weeknd, is a Canadian singer, songwriter, record producer, and actor. Regarded as an influential figure in popular music, he is known for his light-lyric tenor vocal range and falsetto, alternative R&B sound, and dark aesthetics, as well as the cinematic visuals and storytelling of his music videos. His accolades include 4 Grammy Awards, 20 Billboard Music Awards, 22 Juno Awards, 6 American Music Awards, 3 MTV Video Music Awards, and a Latin Grammy Award.

Tesfaye began releasing music anonymously in 2009. After co-founding the record label XO, he released three mixtapes—House of Balloons, Thursday, and Echoes of Silence—in 2011. He signed with Republic Records to compile the mixtapes into the compilation album Trilogy (2012), before releasing his debut studio album, Kiss Land (2013). Following collaborations and film soundtrack contributions from 2013 and 2014, Tesfaye blended alternative R&B with pop on his second and third studio albums, Beauty Behind the Madness (2015) and Starboy (2016); both debuted atop the US Billboard 200 and featured the Billboard Hot 100 number-one singles "Can't Feel My Face", "The Hills", "Starboy", and "Die for You". His debut extended play (EP), My Dear Melancholy (2018), featured the US top-ten single "Call Out My Name".

Tesfaye began an album trilogy based on three time points, starting with the dream pop– and new wave–inspired album After Hours (2020), which spawned the chart-topping singles "Heartless" and "Save Your Tears", as well as "Blinding Lights"—the best-performing song in the Billboard Hot 100's history and the most-streamed song on Spotify. The trilogy's latter two installments, Dawn FM (2022) and Hurry Up Tomorrow (2025), featured the US top-ten singles, "Take My Breath" and "Timeless".

Tesfaye is one of the best-selling and most-streamed artists of all time. He has amassed eight diamond-certified singles from the Recording Industry Association of America (RIAA). The first artist to ever surpass 100 million monthly listeners on Spotify and the highest-paid musician in 2025, he ranked among the world's 100 most influential people by Time in 2020. His After Hours til Dawn Tour (2022–2026) set the record for the highest-grossing tour by a male soloist in history. Tesfaye also co-created and starred in the HBO drama series The Idol (2023) and the film Hurry Up Tomorrow (2025). His other ventures include hosting the Apple Music 1 radio show Memento Mori (2018–2022), being appointed goodwill ambassador for the World Food Programme in 2021, and advocacy for racial equality and food security.

== Life and career ==
=== 1990–2008: Early life ===
Abel Tesfaye (born Abel Makkonen Tesfaye) was born on February 16, 1990, in a city in Ontario, variously reported to be Toronto, (Note: Cited to multiple sources:) or Scarborough. (Note: Cited to multiple sources:) (Note: Toronto and Scarborough were separate cities when Tesfaye was born, and the latter was amalgamated into the former in 1998.) The only child of Ethiopian immigrants Makkonen Tesfaye and Samrawit Hailu, who separated shortly after his birth; he was raised in the suburb of Scarborough by his mother and grandmother. During his childhood, his mother worked several jobs, including in nursing and catering, while attending night school. Tesfaye's patronymic is spelled "Makkonen" instead of the traditional Ethiopian name "Makonnen". The similarity with the Finnish surname Makkonen is pure coincidence. The spelling of Tesfaye's patronymic might be the result of a typographic error or a new form of the traditional name. In 2024, he legally removed his middle name. Tesfaye grew up speaking Amharic, and is also fluent in French, as he attended a French immersion school. He was further educated at West Hill Collegiate Institute and Birchmount Park Collegiate Institute.

At seventeen, Tesfaye dropped out of school and relocated to an apartment in the neighbourhood of Parkdale with two friends, one of whom was La Mar Taylor—his best friend and now creative director. They lived a hedonistic lifestyle, and paid their $850 monthly rent using welfare checks. Later, Tesfaye earned money by selling cannabis and folding clothes at an American Apparel store in downtown Toronto, where his coworkers played his early music without realizing it was his. He also experienced homelessness and was incarcerated on several occasions during this time, which encouraged him to "smarten up, to focus". Tesfaye frequently engaged in drug use, including substances such as ketamine, cocaine, MDMA, magic mushrooms, and cough syrup, stating that drugs were a "crutch" for him when he wrote music. He adopted his stage name because he moved to Parkdale on a weekend; he removed the last 'e' in 'weekend' to avoid trademark issues with the Canadian pop rock band the Weekend. Before releasing music under his current stage name, he went under the alias "Kin Kane", as part of a hip-hop duo called "Bulleez n Nerdz", and was part of a production team called 'the Noise'.

=== 2009–2014: Trilogy and Kiss Land ===
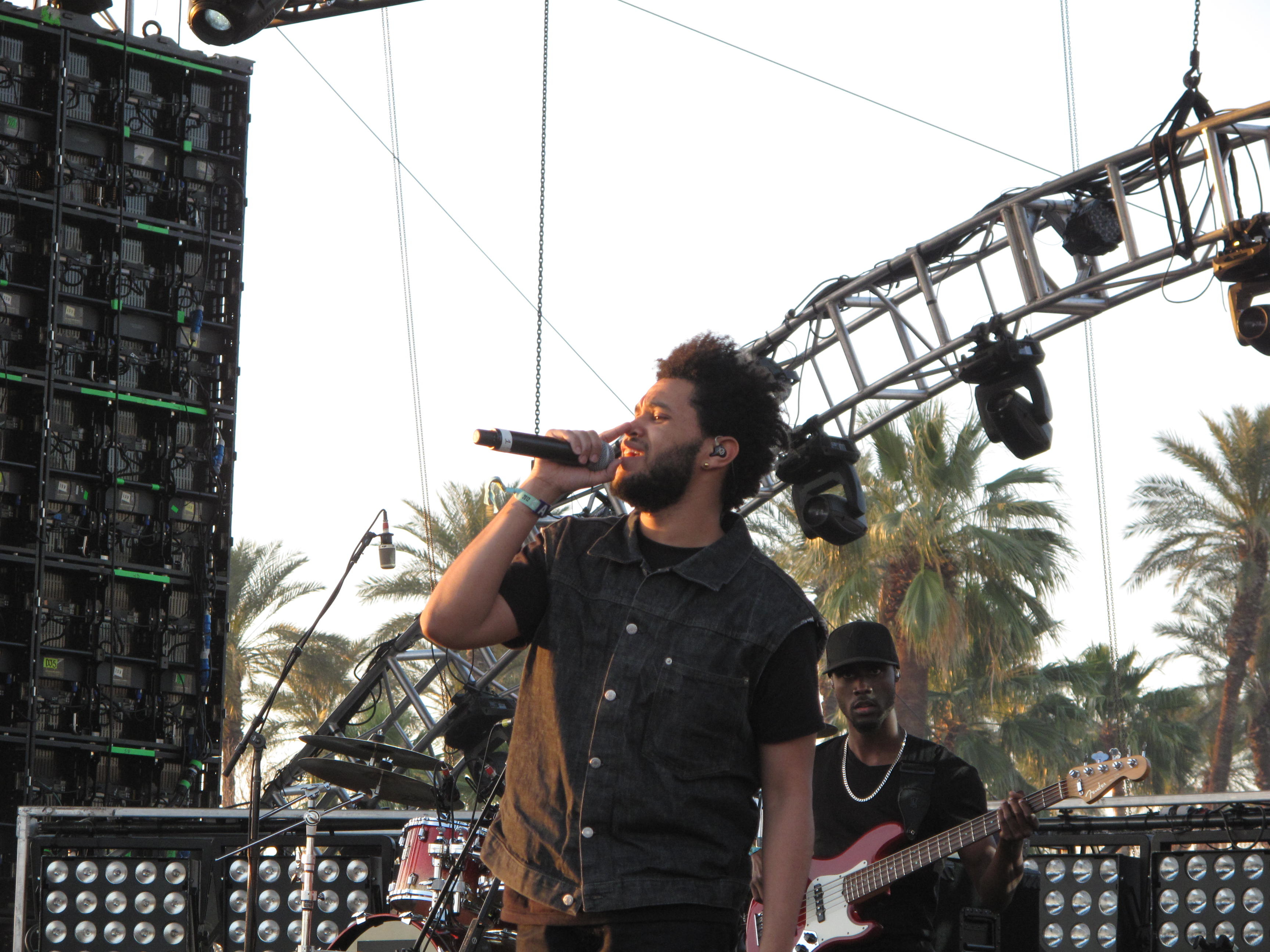
Tesfaye performing at the Coachella Valley Music and Arts Festival in 2012

In August 2009, Tesfaye began anonymously releasing music on YouTube. The following year, he met the producer Jeremy Rose at a party. Rose asked Tesfaye if he wanted to work together as a dark R&B project after hearing him freestyle over an instrumental. After creating multiple songs and parting ways due to creative differences, Tesfaye was allowed to use the songs they made together under the condition that Rose received production credits. In December 2010, Tesfaye uploaded "What You Need", "Loft Music" and "The Morning" to YouTube under the username "xoxxxoooxo". His identity remained undisclosed initially. These songs gained attention online and were later acknowledged in a blog post by the rapper Drake. The songs subsequently received coverage from various media outlets, including Pitchfork and The New York Times.

In 2011, Tesfaye met music executives Wassim "Sal" Slaiby and Amir "Cash" Esmailian, with whom, along with Taylor, he founded the XO record label; earlier in 2009, Tesfaye and Taylor, along with friend and later photographer and collaborator Hyghly Alleyne formed a multimedia collective, She's So Lovely via Tumblr. On March 21, Tesfaye released his debut mixtape, House of Balloons, which featured production from Illangelo and Doc McKinney. The mixtape also included tracks produced by Rose, although he did not receive production credits. House of Balloons was named as one of the ten shortlisted nominees for the 2011 Polaris Music Prize. Tesfaye started working with Drake in May, eventually earning a spot at the latter's OVO Fest on July 31. That month, Tesfaye held his first live performance at The Mod Club in Toronto, which received media attention for Drake being in attendance. He also participated in concerts hosted by the Black Student Association at the University of Toronto. In summer 2011, he also received media attention in the United States when his song "High For This" was featured in an ad campaign for the final season of HBO's "Entourage." On August 18, Tesfaye released his second mixtape, Thursday, which garnered usually positive reviews. Tesfaye contributed to four songs on Drake's second studio album, Take Care, released on November 15, as a songwriter, producer and a featured artist on the album's seventh single, "Crew Love". He released his third mixtape, Echoes of Silence, on December 21. It was a long-listed nominee for the 2012 Polaris Music Prize.

In April 2012, Tesfaye began performing at more shows, such as the Coachella Festival, and two sold-out shows at the Bowery Ballroom in New York City. He also performed at various European festivals, such as Primavera Sound in Spain and Portugal and the Wireless Festival in the United Kingdom. In September, Tesfaye signed with Republic Records; XO was assumed as a subsidiary label. That same month, he embarked on his first concert tour, the Fall Tour, which included his own headlining shows and some opening shows for the English band Florence and the Machine. The tour was performed in North America in September to November. On November 13, Tesfaye released Trilogy, a compilation album comprising re-mixed and remastered versions of his 2011 mixtapes, and three additional tracks. The album debuted at number four on the US Billboard 200 with first-week sales of 86,000 copies, and has received platinum certifications from the Recording Industry Association of America (RIAA) and double-platinum from Music Canada. It also earned Tesfaye a nomination for the Sound of 2013 poll award by BBC.

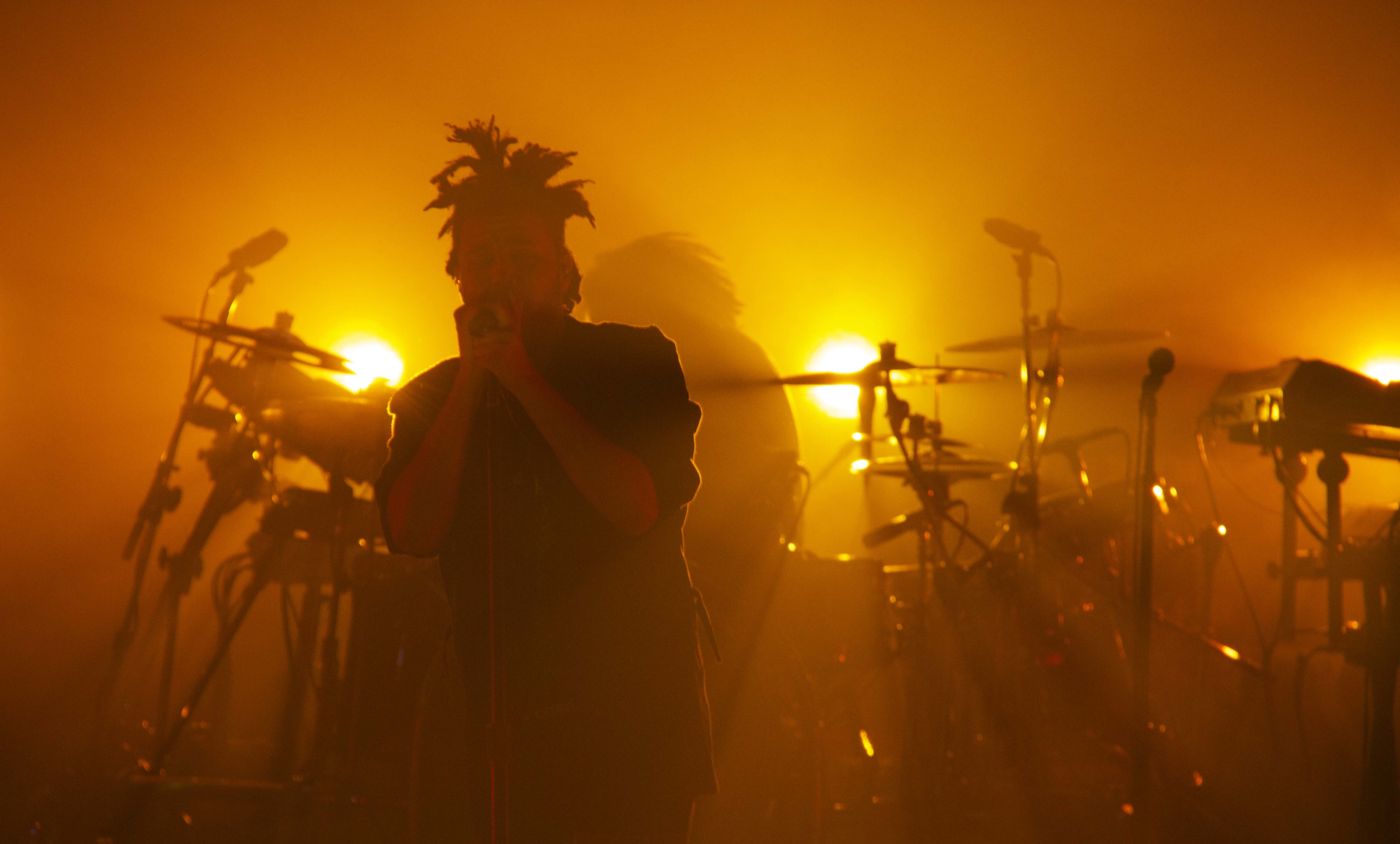
Tesfaye performing at Massey Hall in October 2013

On May 17, 2013, Tesfaye released the title track to his debut studio album, Kiss Land and announced the album's release date of September 10. Upon its release, the album debuted at number two on the Billboard 200 with 96,000 copies and received generally positive reviews from music critics. Tesfaye further promoted the album with a fall tour that occurred in North America and England in September to November. In October 2013, Tesfaye was announced as the opening act for Drake's European leg of Would You Like a Tour?, lasting between February and March 2014. Between November 6 and 13, he served as an opening act for Justin Timberlake during The 20/20 Experience World Tour. He also contributed two songs to the soundtrack for the 2013 film The Hunger Games: Catching Fire, "Devil May Cry" and the soundtrack's second single, "Elastic Heart" with Sia and Diplo.

In February 2014, Tesfaye released a remix of "Drunk in Love" from Beyoncé's eponymous studio album, and Ty Dolla Sign's "Or Nah". He announced the King of the Fall Tour in June, a 4-city tour of North America between September and October and was supported by Schoolboy Q and Jhené Aiko. In promotion of the tour, he released the songs "King of the Fall" and "Often" in July of that year. On August 25, Tesfaye collaborated with Ariana Grande on the song "Love Me Harder" from Grande's second studio album My Everything. It was later released on September 30 as the fourth single from the album, and peaked at number seven on the Billboard Hot 100. On December 23, Tesfaye released the song "Earned It" from the soundtrack for Fifty Shades of Grey (2015). The single, which peaked at number three on the Billboard Hot 100, earned Tesfaye his first and only Academy Award nomination for Best Original Song. The song won Best R&B Performance and was nominated for Best R&B Song and Best Song Written for Visual Media at the 58th Annual Grammy Awards.

=== 2015–2016: Beauty Behind the Madness ===
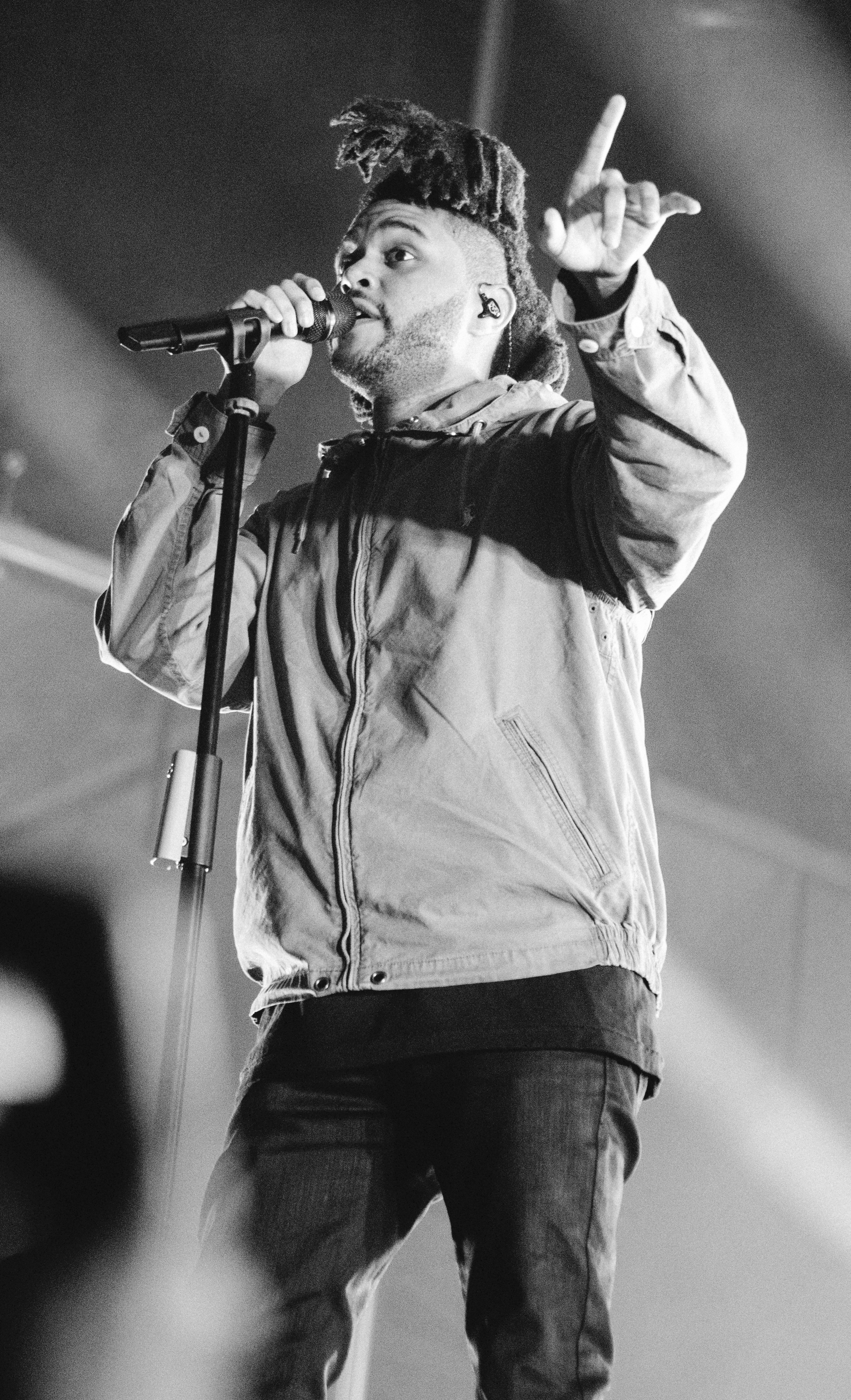
Tesfaye performing at Bumbershoot, 2015

On May 27, 2015, Tesfaye released the second single from Beauty Behind the Madness, "The Hills". The single debuted at number twenty on the Billboard Hot 100, and peaked at number one, becoming Tesfaye's second number-one single, following "Can't Feel My Face", which had reached the number one position before it, and by four years, was certified diamond by the RIAA, marking Tesfaye's first diamond-certified record. In June 2015, after winning the Centric Award at the BET Awards, Tesfaye performed "Earned It" with Alicia Keys. On June 8, he released the song "Can't Feel My Face" as the album's third single. The track was previously leaked in May, but was released as a single following a performance by Tesfaye at the Apple Worldwide Developers Conference. The single debuted at number twenty-four on the Billboard Hot 100, and peaked at number one, making it Tesfaye's third top 10 hit and his first number-one song in the United States. The song was nominated for Record of the Year and Best Pop Solo Performance at the 58th Annual Grammy Awards.

Tesfaye occupied all three slots on Billboard's Hot R&B/Hip-Hop Songs chart simultaneously with the aforementioned singles, becoming the first artist in history to accomplish this. He was also unveiled as one of the musical faces of the streaming service Apple Music, alongside Drake. During the 2015 MTV Video Music Awards, Apple debuted a two-part promotional commercial featuring Tesfaye, which had a guest appearance from John Travolta. In July, Tesfaye headlined the inaugural FVDED in the Park festival in Surrey, British Columbia. On June 29, Tesfaye was featured on Meek Mill's second studio album Dreams Worth More Than Money (2015), on the track "Pullin' Up".

Beauty Behind the Madness, Tesfaye's second studio album, was released on August 28, 2015, and debuted atop the Billboard 200, earning 412,000 album-equivalent units in its first week. It reached the top 10 in over ten countries and reached number one in Canada, Australia, Norway, and the United Kingdom. The album was promoted by Tesfaye headlining various summer music festivals, including Lollapalooza, the Hard Summer Music Festival, and the Bumbershoot Festival. He announced The Madness Fall Tour, his first large-scale tour across the United States, which began in November, and concluded in December. The album was certified double platinum in the U.S., and sold 1.5 million copies worldwide. It was the most-streamed album in 2015, with over 60 million streams, and was ranked on multiple lists of albums of the year. The three singles that preceded the album were certified platinum in the United States. The album won Best Urban Contemporary Album and was nominated for Album of the Year at the 58th Annual Grammy Awards.

On September 4, 2015, Tesfaye was featured on Travis Scott's debut album Rodeo, on the track "Pray 4 Love". On October 10, Tesfaye appeared on Saturday Night Live alongside actress Amy Schumer, performing as the show's musical guest. This was his first performance on the show as a solo artist, after appearing with Ariana Grande to perform "Love Me Harder". In November, he began his debut arena tour, The Madness Fall Tour, concluding in December. On December 18, Tesfaye was featured on Belly's single "Might Not" from his eighth mixtape Up For Days. On February 14, 2016, Tesfaye was featured on Kanye West's seventh studio album The Life of Pablo on the track "FML". It marked their second collaboration, with West previously writing and producing on Tesfaye's track "Tell Your Friends" from Beauty Behind the Madness. On March 1, Tesfaye was featured on Future's single "Low Life" from his fourth studio album Evol. On April 23, he was featured on Beyoncé's sixth studio album Lemonade on the track "6 Inch". On August 26, Tesfaye was featured on Cashmere Cat's single "Wild Love" with Francis and the Lights, which served as the lead single from Cashmere Cat's debut studio album 9 (2017).

=== 2016–2019: Starboy and My Dear Melancholy, ===
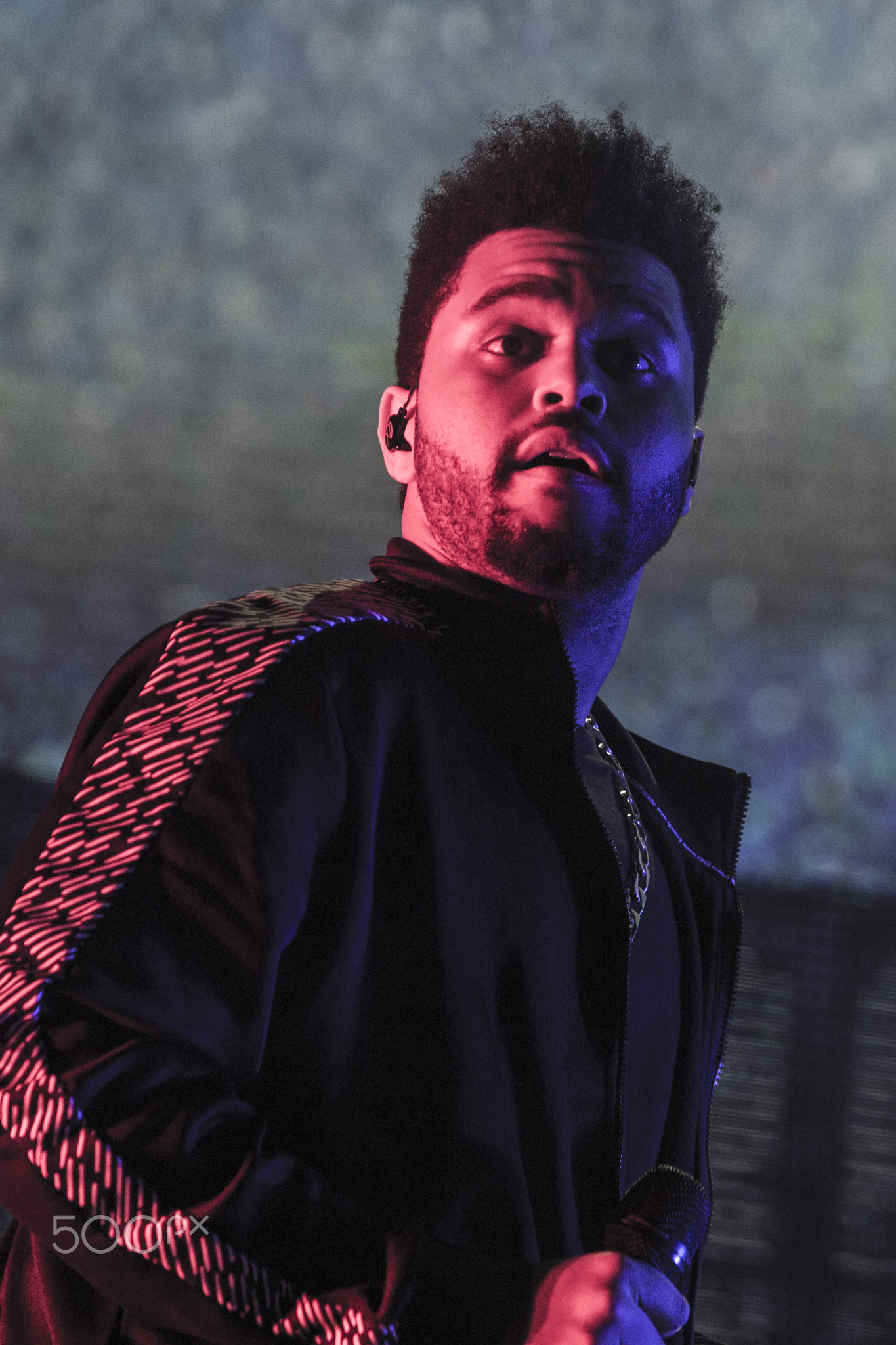
Tesfaye performing at Lollapalooza Chile during the Starboy: Legend of the Fall Tour in 2017

In September 2016, Tesfaye announced that his third studio album, Starboy, would be released on November 25, and included collaborations with now-disbanded French electronic music duo Daft Punk. He released the album's title track, which featured the duo on September 21. The song debuted at number 40 on the Billboard Hot 100, and peaked at number one, making it Tesfaye's third number-one single. As of March 2023, the song is certified Diamond by the RIAA. Their second collaboration, "I Feel It Coming" was released on November 24. The single peaked at number four on the Billboard Hot 100. On October 1, Tesfaye made a second appearance on Saturday Night Live as the musical guest alongside actress Margot Robbie. During the show, he performed "Starboy" and "False Alarm". On November 23, he released the short film M A N I A. Directed by Grant Singer, it featured excerpts from the album, including snippets from "All I Know" featuring Future, "Sidewalks" featuring Kendrick Lamar, "Secrets", and "Die for You". Upon release, the album debuted at number one on the U.S. Billboard 200 with 348,000 units, making it Tesfaye's second consecutive number-one album. As of January 2019, the album is certified triple platinum by the RIAA. The album won Best Urban Contemporary Album at the 60th Annual Grammy Awards, making it Tesfaye's second win in the category.

On February 17, 2017, Tesfaye began his fifth concert tour, called Starboy: Legend of the Fall Tour. The tour was in support of his third studio album Starboy, and concluded on December 14. He visited the continents Europe, North America, and Oceania. On February 15, Tesfaye was featured on Nav's commercial debut single "Some Way", which also served as the lead single from his self-titled mixtape. On February 24, he appeared on Future's sixth studio album Hndrxx, on the song "Comin Out Strong". On April 19, Tesfaye appeared on the title track and second single from Lana Del Rey's fifth studio album. On July 30, he was featured on French Montana's track "A Lie", the third single from his second studio album Jungle Rules. He then appeared on the Virgil Abloh-directed music video for Lil Uzi Vert's "XO Tour Llif3" alongside Nav. He was later featured on Lil Uzi Vert's debut album Luv Is Rage 2 on the track "UnFazed" and on Gucci Mane's eleventh studio album Mr. Davis on the track "Curve".

On February 2, 2018, Tesfaye contributed to the soundtrack for Black Panther on the song "Pray for Me" with Kendrick Lamar. The track served as the third single from the soundtrack, and peaked at number seven on the Billboard Hot 100. On March 30, Tesfaye released his debut extended play My Dear Melancholy, after news of the project were teased and leaked. The EP debuted at number one on the Billboard 200 with 169,000 units, making it Tesfaye's third consecutive number-one album and the shortest album, by track count, to top the chart in eight years. On April 6, Tesfaye released the EP's lead single "Call Out My Name", which peaked at number four on the Billboard Hot 100. On April 13, he headlined the Coachella Valley Music and Arts Festival for the first time. He appeared in multiple festivals throughout 2018 to support the EP, most notably the Mawazine Festival in Morocco, Lollapalooza in both Chicago and Berlin, and a post-race concert at the Abu Dhabi Grand Prix.

On June 6, 2018, Tesfaye announced his new Apple Music 1 radio show Memento Mori. The first episode was released two days later. He would later feature on two tracks from Travis Scott's third studio album, Astroworld, which were "Skeletons" and "Wake Up" on August 3. On November 21, he released his first greatest hits album The Weeknd in Japan. In support of the album and his EP My Dear Melancholy, he began his sixth concert tour, the Weeknd Asia Tour, a six-show tour of Asia during November and December. On January 11, 2019, Tesfaye was featured on Gesaffelstein's song "Lost in the Fire", the second single from his second studio album Hyperion. On April 18, he released "Power Is Power" with SZA and Travis Scott, the lead single from the Game of Thrones-inspired soundtrack. On August 30, during the Telluride Film Festival, he made his acting debut in the film Uncut Gems as himself.

=== 2019–2021: After Hours and Super Bowl LV halftime show ===
On November 24, 2019, Tesfaye teased his single "Blinding Lights" through a Mercedes-Benz commercial. On November 27, he released "Heartless" as the lead single from his fourth studio album. The song debuted at number thirty-two on the Billboard Hot 100 and peaked at number one, making it Tesfaye's fourth number-one single. "Blinding Lights" was released two days after the release of "Heartless" on November 29. The single debuted at number eleven on the Billboard Hot 100 and peaked at number one, making it Tesfaye's fifth number-one single. "Blinding Lights" would then go on to become the first song in the chart's history to hold a spot in the top ten for an entire year. It also became the longest charting song by a solo artist on the Hot 100 at 90 weeks, ending the week of September 11, 2021. On November 23, 2021, "Blinding Lights" was ranked as the best-performing song in the Billboard Hot 100's history, surpassing "The Twist" by Chubby Checker. On January 1, 2023, it became the most streamed song on Spotify with 3.3 billion streams.

On February 19, 2020, Tesfaye revealed that his fourth studio album would be titled After Hours, and would be released on March 20. He also released the album's title track as a promotional single. On March 7, he made his third appearance as a musical guest on Saturday Night Live, alongside actor Daniel Craig. On the show, he starred in the skit "On The Couch" with actors Kenan Thompson and Chris Redd, performed "Blinding Lights", and debuted the track "Scared to Live". Tesfaye released the album's third single "In Your Eyes" on March 24. The track peaked at number sixteen on the Billboard Hot 100. Upon release, After Hours debuted atop the Billboard 200, earning 444,000 units, marking Tesfaye's fourth consecutive number-one album. It became the most streamed R&B album of all time, surpassing Tesfaye's own Starboy. In the album's first charting week, Tesfaye also became the first artist to lead the Billboard 200, Billboard Hot 100, Billboard Artist 100, Hot 100 Songwriters and Hot 100 Producers charts simultaneously, and repeated his lead the following week. The deluxe version of After Hours was released on March 29, 2020, and contained the tracks "Nothing Compares", "Missed You" and "Final Lullaby". On May 4, Tesfaye made a guest appearance on the American Dad! episode "A Starboy Is Born", also co-written by Tesfaye and featuring a song titled "The Weeknd's Dark Secret". On July 27, he voiced three characters during the 200th episode of Robot Chicken.

On August 7, 2020, Tesfaye was featured on the late Juice Wrld's single "Smile" from his first posthumous album Legends Never Die. On August 28, he was featured on Calvin Harris' single "Over Now". On October 30, Tesfaye appeared on Ariana Grande's song "Off the Table" from her sixth studio album Positions. On the same day, he appeared on Oneohtrix Point Never's track "No Nightmares" from his ninth studio album Magic Oneohtrix Point Never, which he also executive produced with OPN. On November 5, he appeared on the remix of Maluma's "Hawái", was nominated for Best Urban Fusion/Performance at the 22nd Annual Latin Grammy Awards. On December 10, he performed at iHeartRadio's Jingle Ball. On February 5, 2021, Tesfaye released his second greatest hits album The Highlights. The album debuted at number two on the US Billboard 200, making it Tesfaye's highest charting compilation album and the biggest first week debut for a greatest hits album since Fully Loaded: God's Country (2019).

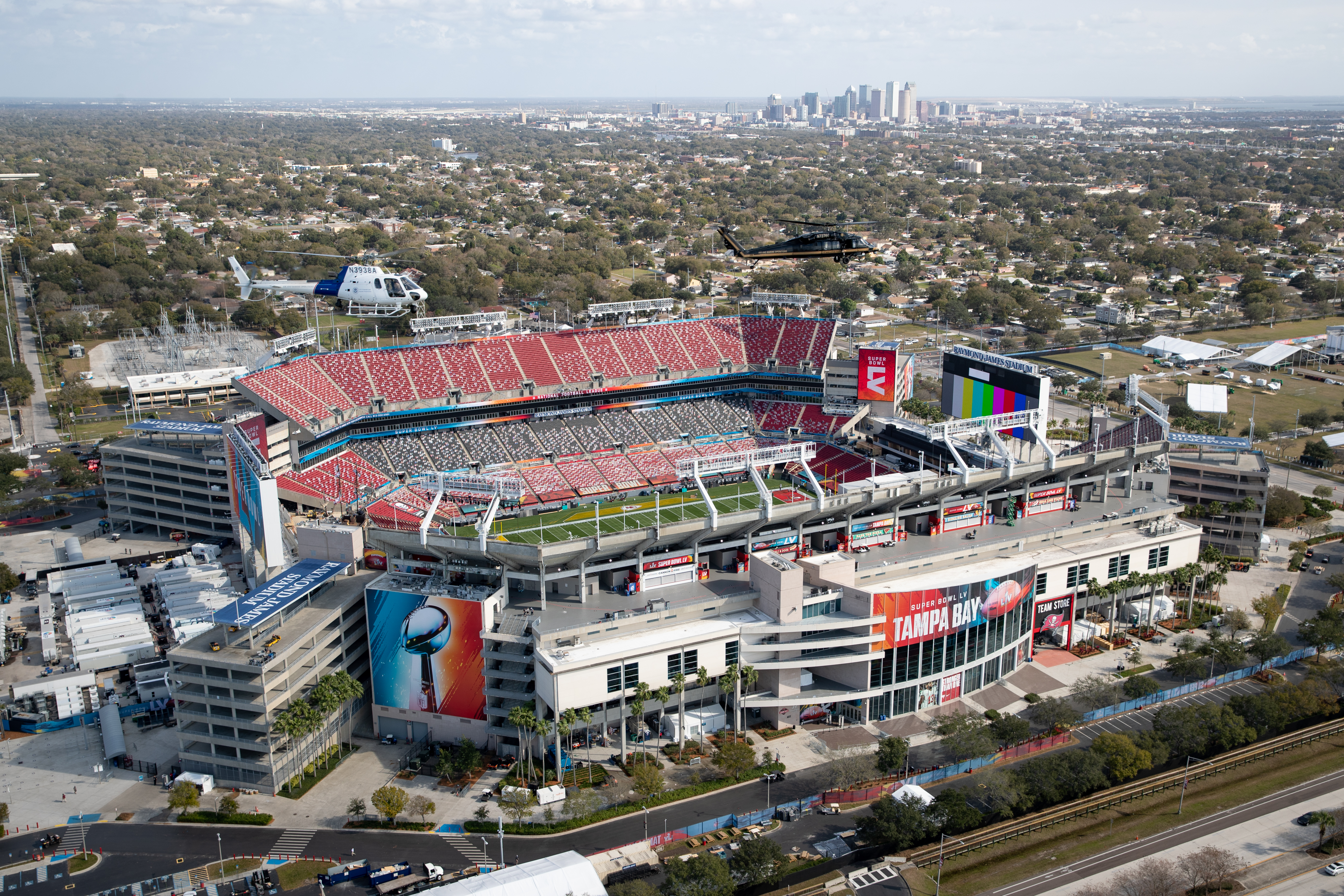
Tesfaye headlined the Super Bowl LV halftime show at the Raymond James Stadium in 2021

Tesfaye headlined the Super Bowl LV halftime show on February 7, 2021, becoming the first Canadian solo artist to headline the show. He reportedly spent US$7 million of his own money on the Super Bowl performance. Reviews of the performance were generally positive. The show resulted in a surge in streaming and downloads for Tesfaye's After Hours album as well as for the seven other songs he performed. The halftime show earned three nominations at the 73rd Primetime Emmy Awards: Outstanding Variety Special (Live), Outstanding Lighting Design/Lighting Direction for a Variety Special, and Outstanding Technical Direction, Camerawork, Video Control for a Special.

Over 2021, Tesfaye reissued his three mixtapes in its authentic form with the original mixes and samples to celebrate the tenth anniversary of their release, with House of Balloons coming first in March. Thursday's reissue followed in August, and in December, Echoes of Silence was reissued. On April 23, Tesfaye released a remix of "Save Your Tears" with Ariana Grande, marking their third collaboration. The remix launched the song to the top of the Billboard Hot 100 on the chart dated May 8, 2021, becoming both artists' sixth number one hit. He later began to tease new music in the same month. When asked about a new album during an interview with Variety, he explained that "if the last record is the After Hours of the night, then The Dawn is coming". On May 11, Tesfaye performed "Save Your Tears" at the Brit Awards. He also accepted his first Brit Award for International Male Solo Artist, which was presented to him by former first lady of the United States Michelle Obama.

On May 24, Tesfaye performed "Save Your Tears" at the Billboard Music Awards. He was nominated for a record sixteen awards, and won ten, including Top Artist and Top Hot 100 Song. When accepting his awards, Tesfaye continued to tease new music by saying "the After Hours are done, and The Dawn is coming". On May 28, he performed the remix of "Save Your Tears" at the iHeartRadio Music Awards with Ariana Grande. On June 25, Tesfaye appeared on Doja Cat's single "You Right" from her third studio album Planet Her. On July 22, he appeared on Belly's single "Better Believe" with Young Thug from his third studio album See You Next Wednesday.

=== 2021–2023: Dawn FM ===
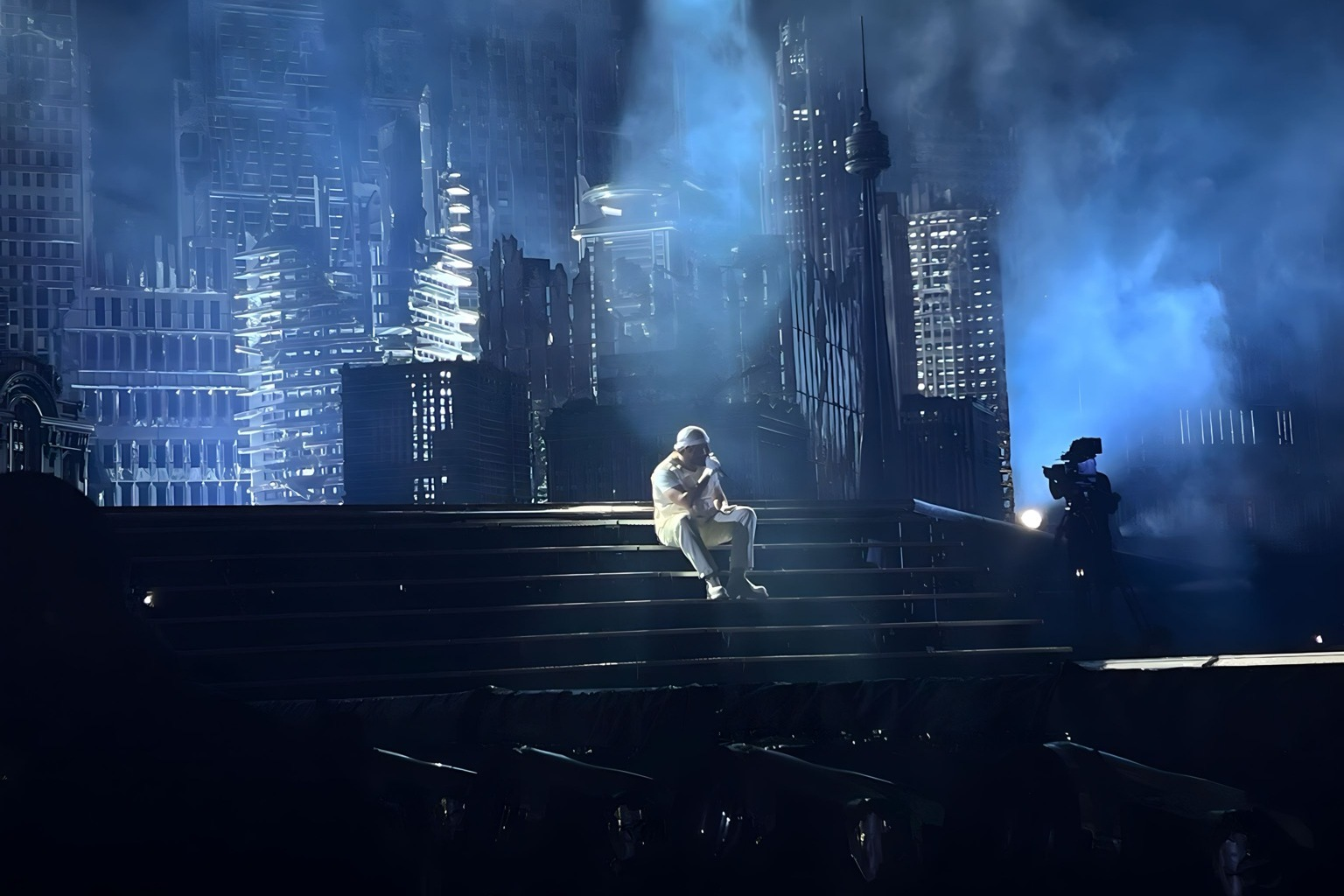
Tesfaye in July 2023 during his After Hours til Dawn Tour in Paris.

On August 2, 2021, Tesfaye released a snippet of new music on social media. He appeared on the cover of the September 2021 issue of GQ, marking the magazine's first global publication. Then, in a collaboration with NBC Sports and the 2020 Summer Olympics, Tesfaye announced the single "Take My Breath", which was released on August 6. Later that month, he appeared on Kanye West's tenth studio album Donda on the track "Hurricane", which won Best Melodic Rap Performance at the 64th Annual Grammy Awards. On October 4, during an episode of Memento Mori, Tesfaye revealed that his fifth studio album was complete and that he was waiting on a "couple characters that are key to the narrative." On October 18, Tesfaye announced that his upcoming tour, originally titled the After Hours Tour, would be held entirely in stadiums due to arena constraints and was scheduled to commence in July 2022. The tour was renamed as the After Hours til Dawn Tour, and would incorporate elements from his fourth and fifth studio albums.

On October 22, 2021, Tesfaye appeared on Swedish House Mafia's single "Moth to a Flame" from their debut studio album Paradise Again. On November 5, he appeared on Post Malone's single "One Right Now" from his fourth studio album Twelve Carat Toothache. On November 11, he was featured on Rosalía's single "La Fama" from her third studio album Motomami. On December 16, Tesfaye was featured on FKA Twigs' single "Tears in the Club" from her debut mixtape Caprisongs. The next day, on December 17, he was featured on Aaliyah's single "Poison" from her posthumous album Unstoppable. Tesfaye released his fifth studio album Dawn FM on January 7, 2022. Upon release, the album debuted at number two on the Billboard 200 with 148,000 units, marking Tesfaye's eighth top ten entry and his second non-consecutive album to debut at number two. He also broke the record for the most simultaneous entries for a male soloist on the Billboard Global 200, with twenty-four songs on the chart. In addition to "Take My Breath", Dawn FM was supported by the singles "Sacrifice" and "Out of Time". On February 26, Tesfaye premiered The Dawn FM Experience, a television music special in partnership with Amazon Prime Video.

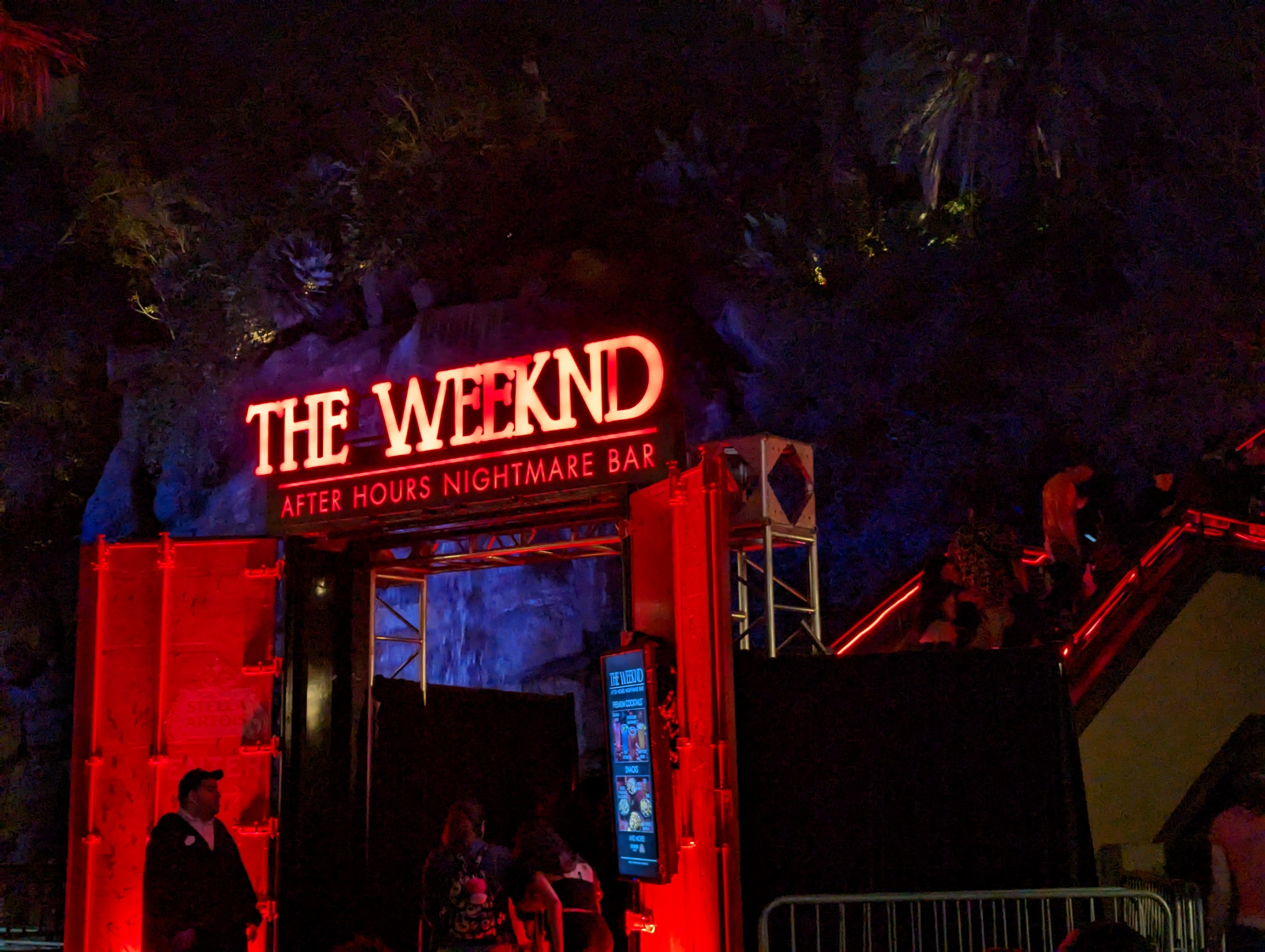
The Weeknd's haunted house as part of Universal's Halloween Horror Nights.

On March 20, 2022, Tesfaye played in an episode of the cartoon The Simpsons. On April 18, he headlined the Coachella Valley Music and Arts Festival for the second time, performing alongside Swedish House Mafia. On July 8, his record of most number-one songs on the Billboard Hot R&B Songs chart was surpassed by fellow singer and would-be rival Chris Brown; Weeknd had 71 while Brown broke his record by 8 more. On July 26, Tesfaye announced that he would host a haunted house at Universal Studios Florida and Hollywood, as part of Universal's Halloween Horror Nights hosted every Halloween. Tesfaye appeared on the song "Creepin'" from Metro Boomin's album, Heroes & Villains, on December 2. His song "Nothing Is Lost (You Give Me Strength)", made for the film Avatar: The Way of Water's official soundtrack, was released on December 16.

On February 24, 2023, following months-long renewed interest in and virality of Tesfaye's 2016 song "Die for You", which began charting in 2022 and reached a new peak of 6 on the Billboard Hot 100 6 years after its release, a remix of the song featuring Ariana Grande was released. The remix marked their fourth collaboration. In the Billboard Hot 100 issue dated March 11, the remix reached the top of the chart, becoming both artists' seventh number one hit. On February 27, in the wake of the remix's success, Tesfaye became the first artist to surpass 100 million monthly listeners on Spotify. On March 3, Tesfaye released his first live album, titled Live at SoFi Stadium. It featured recordings from his HBO concert film of the same name, showcasing the last concert of the North American leg of his After Hours til Dawn Tour at SoFi Stadium. He subsequently featured on four songs—"Artificial Intelligence", "Defame Moi", "More Coke!!", and "Emotionless"—from Mike Dean's album 4:23, released on April 29. On May 8, Tesfaye stated that he was intending to retire the moniker of "the Weeknd" in favor of performing under his birth name, or adopting a new pseudonym altogether. He explained that his upcoming album would most likely serve as his "final hurrah" under the name. He later withdrew his decision, stating on September 18, 2026, that he was "not stepping away from anything" and that "I'm going to keep doing this for as long as I possibly can. The Weeknd isn't going anywhere."

=== 2023–2024: The Idol ===
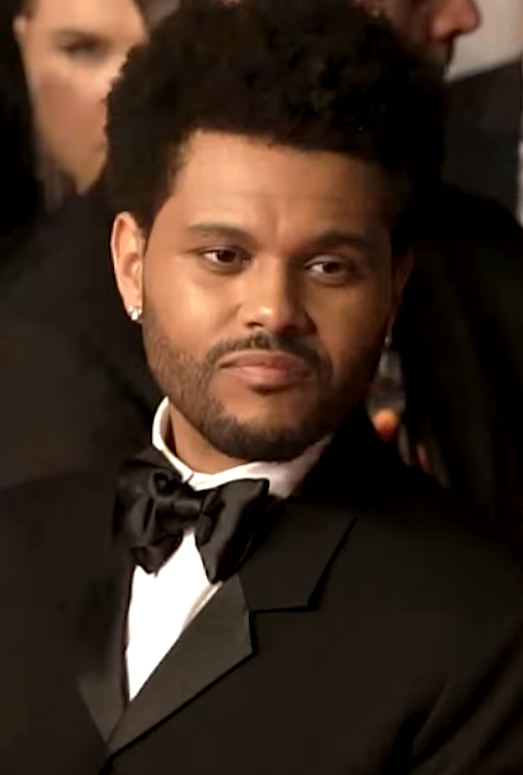
Tesfaye at the 2023 Cannes Film Festival

Tesfaye co-created the HBO drama series The Idol with Sam Levinson, and stars in the show alongside Lily-Rose Depp. The series premiered at the 2023 Cannes Film Festival out of competition, where it received significant controversy for its graphic depiction of onscreen nudity and sexual content. The series debuted to widespread negative reviews from critics. The Hollywood Reporter stated that the series confirms the allegations that "Instead of subtly skewering the misogynistic and predatory nature of the business, The Idol became a forbidden love story — the stuff of a toxic man's fantasy", and called it "regressive rather than transgressive". He received negative reviews for his acting, with critic Robert Daniels of The Playlist writing, "Tesfaye is also a terrible actor. He lacks the comfortability, the gravitas, charisma, and charm to increase the viability of Jocelyn being attracted to him. In most scenes, Tesfaye either hides under the cover of dim lighting, obtrusive coverage, or re-recorded dialogue dubbed into several scenes." On August 28, 2023, HBO announced it had cancelled The Idol after one season.

On June 8, 2023, Tesfaye announced a series of EPs featuring music from The Idol. Originally intended as a soundtrack album, each EP was released following the premiere of each episode of the show, which featured collaborations with Future, Playboi Carti, Madonna, Lil Baby, Lily-Rose Depp, and Jennie from the South Korean girl group Blackpink. These EPs yielded the hit singles "Popular" and "One of the Girls". Later in June he received an invitation from the Academy to become a member. On July 21, Tesfaye appeared on Travis Scott's lead single "K-pop" from his fourth studio album Utopia, and later appeared on another track on Scott's album, "Circus Maximus". Tesfaye appeared on Diddy's single "Another One of Me" on September 15, which he called his "final feature", despite releasing multiple collaborations with Metro Boomin and Future in 2024.

On December 2, 2023, Fortnite announced that Tesfaye would be featured as the headlining artist for its Fortnite Festival gamemode and outfits of him would become available to play with on December 9. His outfits have three different variants of himself; the red suit seen throughout the promotional material for After Hours, the outfit from his 2022 Coachella performance, and two of the costumes that he was seen wearing during the After Hours til Dawn Tour. Tesfaye first teased news of a follow-up album to Dawn FM in 2022, telling his fans: "[I] wonder... did you know you're experiencing a new trilogy?" via Twitter. On January 8, 2024, he further teased an upcoming album, posting pictures of his last two albums and a question mark on his social media. On March 22, he appeared on the track "Young Metro" from Future and Metro Boomin's collaborative album, We Don't Trust You, as well as three tracks on Future and Metro Boomin's We Still Don't Trust You album two weeks later.

=== 2024–present: Hurry Up Tomorrow ===
On July 17, 2024, Tesfaye announced a one-night show in São Paulo, Brazil, set to take place on September 7, 2024. He announced the title of his upcoming sixth album, Hurry Up Tomorrow, three days prior to the concert, and on September 13, released "Dancing in the Flames", which was then intended as the debut single from the album. Three days later, he released an acoustic version of the song. On September 27, Tesfaye released "Timeless", featuring previous collaborator Playboi Carti, peaking at number three on the Billboard Hot 100 and becoming his highest debut on that chart to date. On October 30, Tesfaye released "São Paulo", featuring Brazilian singer Anitta. The album was released on January 31, 2025. Upon release, the album debuted at number one on the Billboard 200 with 490,500 units, including 359,000 pure album sales, the latter figure being the highest for any male artist since 2020. With this feat, Hurry Up Tomorrow marks his fifth Billboard 200 chart-topping album and his highest opening week sales by overall units in the country. The album also marked the second largest week opener of 2025 (after Morgan Wallen's I'm the Problem), and the largest for any album since Taylor Swift's The Tortured Poets Department (2024). On March 14, 2025, Tesfaye appeared on the US top five single "Rather Lie" from Playboi Carti's third studio album, Music.

Tesfaye starred alongside Jenna Ortega in a companion film Hurry Up Tomorrow (2025) directed by Trey Edward Shults, released on May 16 and widely criticized by critics, bombing at the box office bomb with grossing $7.6 million from its $15 million budget. Brandon Yu of The New York Times described the psychological thriller as being "all style and no substance". Charles Bramesco of IndieWire criticized Tesfaye's acting and writing, describing it as "modes of imitative, hollow performance, like a bad actor's varying notions of good acting". Jordan Hoffman of Entertainment Weekly criticized the overall film as being a "nearly plot-free movie, [that] is self-indulgent, overly serious, and, worst of all, just plain dull." IndieWire labeled it one of the "worst vanity projects ever made". A more positive review came from G. Allen Johnson of the San Francisco Chronicle who described the film as "a risk-taking experience" and "visually marvelous as it is head-scratching", acknowledging it was imperfect, but applauding the way in which it "questions, probes and challenges viewers".

Having already set a new record for the top grossing tour by a male solo artist, on December 30, 2025, Tesfaye became the first artist on Spotify to have thirty songs with more than one billion streams each. Tesfaye continued to set new touring milestones throughout 2026, selling out a record-breaking six consecutive shows at the Stade de France and grossing more than 120 million in July alone, while his two nights in Jakarta helped generate nearly 14 million in economic activity for the city. On October 31, 2026, Tesfaye released "Hong Kong", the track samples the Faye Wong song "Monsoon (季候風)" and had been previously premiered in concert at Kai Tak Stadium.

== Artistry ==
=== Influences ===
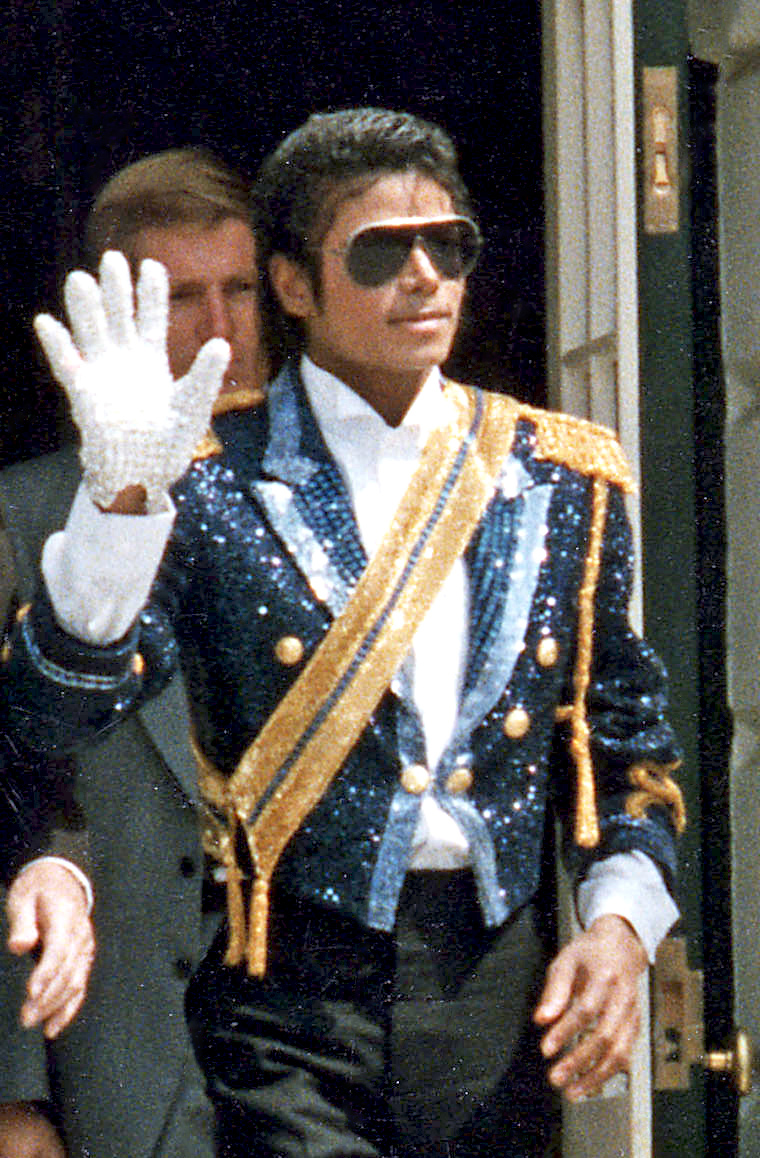
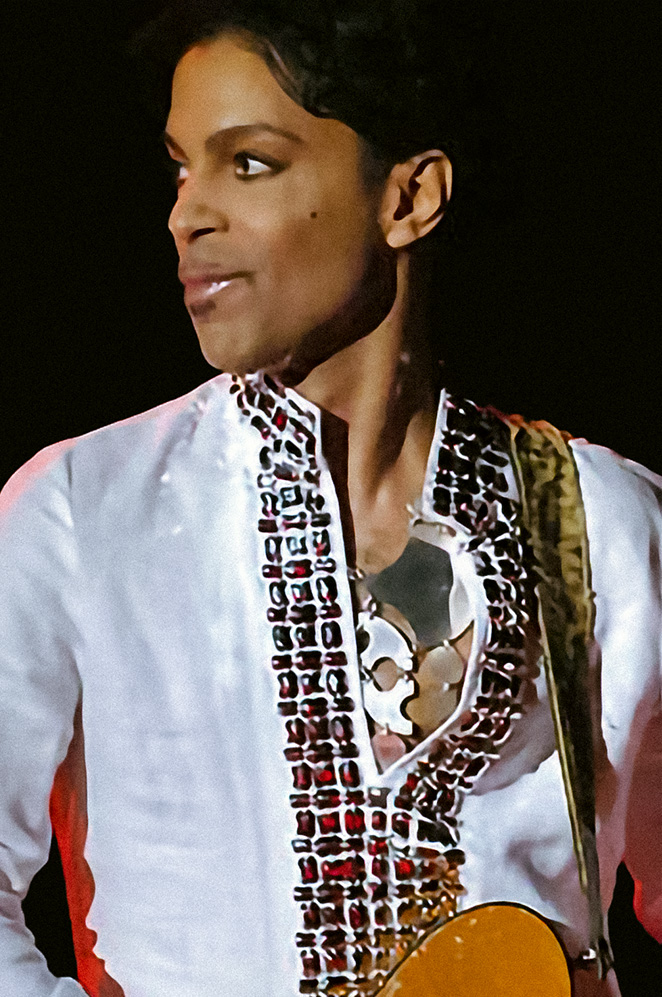
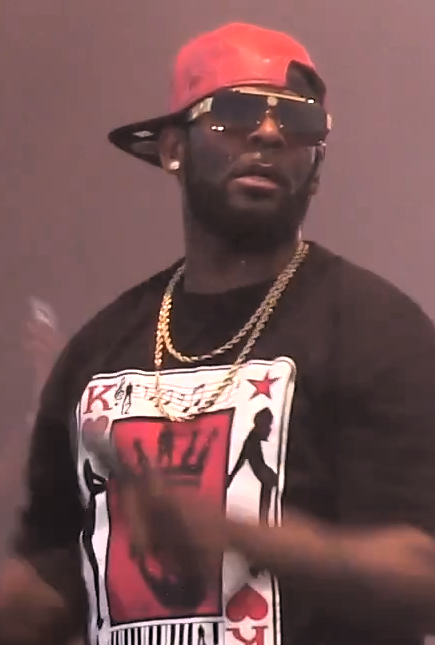
Tesfaye cites Michael Jackson, Prince, and R. Kelly as his main musical inspirations.

Tesfaye cites Michael Jackson, Prince, and R. Kelly as his main musical inspirations. He has attributed Jackson's music as key in spurring him to be a singer, referencing the lyrics to "Dirty Diana" as an example. His high-flying vocal style was influenced by Ethiopian singers such as Aster Aweke. He grew up listening to a variety of music genres, including soul, hip hop, funk, indie rock, and post-punk. Tesfaye is heavily influenced by 1980s music, and credits the video game Grand Theft Auto: Vice City (2002) for "opening my eyes" to the music of that era. "I've always had an admiration for the era before I was born", he said in an interview for Billboard. "You can hear it as far back as my first mixtape that the '80s – Siouxsie and the Banshees, Cocteau Twins – play such a huge role in my sound."

Tesfaye has named Deftones as one of his influences during the making of House of Balloons, Thursday and Echoes of Silence. He has also cited Lana Del Rey, David Bowie, the Smiths, Bad Brains, Talking Heads, DeBarge, 50 Cent, Wu-Tang Clan, and Eminem as influences and inspirations. When Daft Punk announced their split in 2021, Tesfaye praised them during an interview with Variety, saying: "Those guys are one of the reasons I make music, so I can't even compare them to other people..."

=== Production and songwriting ===
"House of Balloons"
A 30-second sample of one of Tesfaye's early songs, "House of Balloons", showcasing the singer's alternative R&B sound alongside a sample of Siouxsie and the Banshees' "Happy House".

Tesfaye's songs are "built around a fogged, crepuscular production", and feature slow tempos, rumbling bass, and forlorn echoes. His music incorporates samples that are unconventional in R&B production, including punk, shoegaze, dream pop and alternative rock. Marc Hogan of Spin says that Tesfaye's samples tend "to draw from rock critic-approved sources, though generally ones that already share elements of his sexual menace", sampling artists such as Beach House, Siouxsie and the Banshees and Aaliyah. Tesfaye worked mostly with producers Illangelo and Doc McKinney, whom Ian Cohen of Pitchfork credits with developing "a state-of-the-art R&B template" with the artist. In concert, Tesfaye reappropriates his digitized productions with a suite-like arena rock aesthetic.

His emotional, plaintive lyrics often express feelings of hurt and deal with subject matter such as sex, drugs, and partying; this is seen especially in After Hours and House of Balloons. Hermione Hoby of The Guardian characterizes Tesfaye's songs as "narcotised-slow jams" and delineates their message as "partying is an existential experience, sex is fraught with alienation, and everything registers as unreal and unsettling." Paul MacInnes of The Guardian stated that he views Tesfaye's three mixtapes as "a rough trajectory of party, after-party and hangover." Tesfaye has stated that by singing vulgar, ignorant lyrics in an elegant, sexy way, he is "paying homage to R Kelly, and even Prince to a certain extent."

=== Voice and music style ===
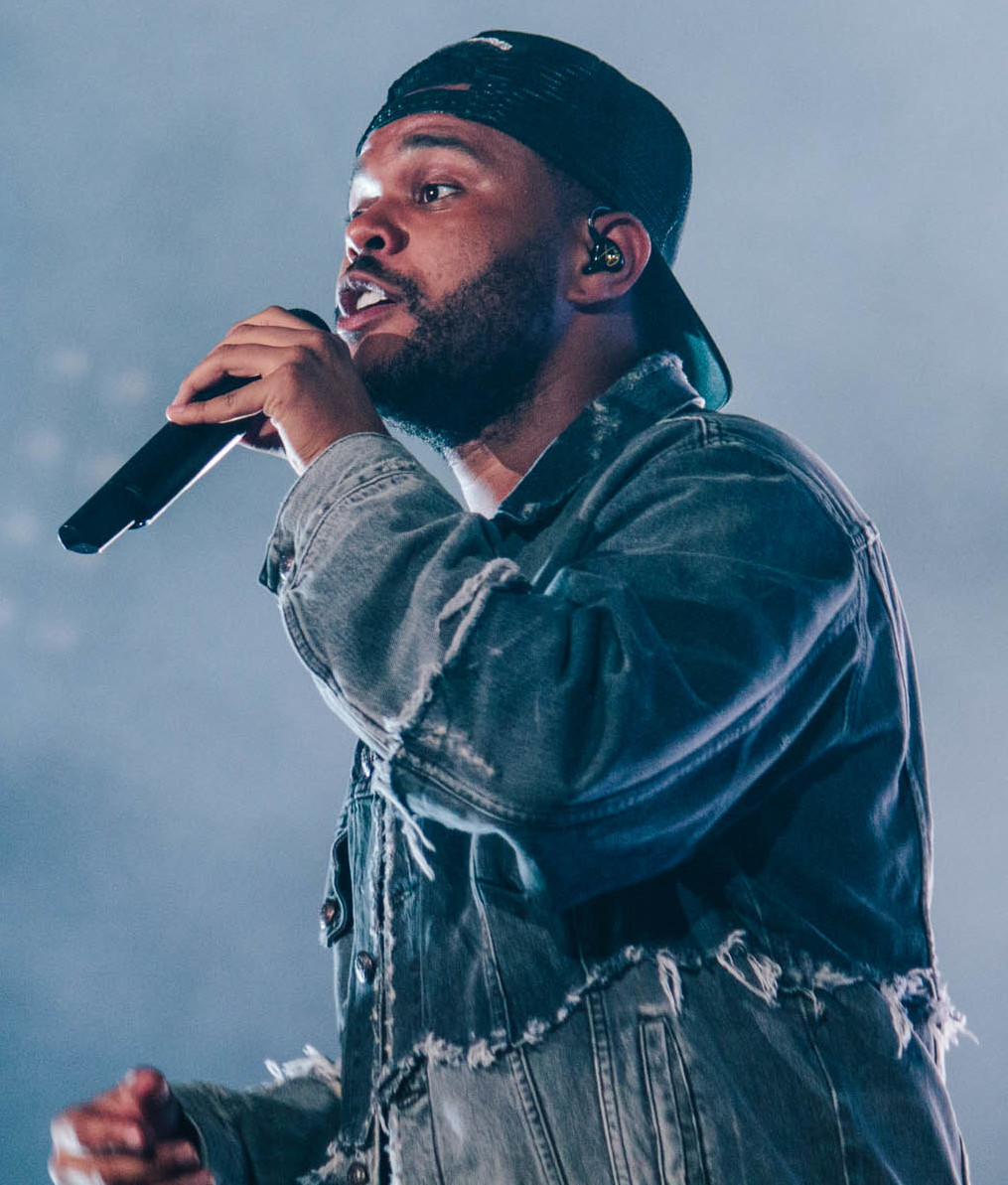
Tesfaye performing in July 2018

Tesfaye often sings in a falsetto register. J. D. Considine finds his singing's "tremulous quality" similar to Michael Jackson, but writes that he eschews Jackson's "strong basis in the blues" for a more Arabic-influenced melisma. Tesfaye possesses a wide light-lyric tenor vocal range, which spans over three octaves. His vocal range reaches its extreme low at the bass F (F_{2}), and its peak high at the tenor G♯ (G♯_{5}), with a natural tessitura within the upper fourth octave. Tesfaye often makes use of his head voice to build resonance to belt out strong high notes within the fifth octave. Tesfaye's vocals have a recognizable Ethiopian characteristic. Hannah Giogis of Pitchfork notes that "his trademark vibrato, the characteristically pained whine that pervades much of Tesfaye's music, draws from a long Ethiopian musical legacy of tortured pining. Imbuing our voices with the shaky pain of loss—romantic or otherwise—is a hallmark of Ethiopian musical tradition. Tesfaye, with his staccato wails and aching nostalgia, is a young, North American addition to a dynasty of melodramatic Ethiopian singers." In 2023, Rolling Stone ranked the Weeknd at number 110 on its list of the 200 Greatest Singers of All Time.

Tesfaye's discography spans pop, R&B, hip-hop, and dance genres. His earlier work is generally categorized as alternative R&B, due to its contributions in broadening the genre's musical palette to incorporate electronic and indie styles, while his later work gravitates towards electropop. Critics have credited his early work with helping shape the development of alternative R&B. Tesfaye shared his thoughts on the primary label during an interview with Time in 2015, stating: "Alternative R&B is in my soul. It's not going anywhere. When I put out songs from House of Balloons in 2010, people said I made R&B cool again. I'm assuming that's when the label was created. I feel honored that a good part of today's music is inspired by it, consciously or subconsciously. The only way I could have done that was to be ambitious and grand." Tesfaye's first three mixtapes; House of Balloons, Thursday and Echoes of Silence, are alternative R&B projects that draw on dream pop, post-punk and trip hop, amongst others. His debut studio album Kiss Land is categorized as R&B and dark wave. His next three albums, Beauty Behind the Madness, Starboy and After Hours, are considered R&B and pop; with Starboy utilizing heavy trap influences, and After Hours drawing on new wave and dream pop influences. Tesfaye's fifth studio album Dawn FM explores dance-pop and synth-pop genres.

== Legacy ==
=== Influence on R&B and pop ===
Music journalists have credited Tesfaye's early work, particularly his 2011 mixtape House of Balloons, with helping reshape contemporary R&B and pop. In a 2016 roundtable, The Fader writers described the mixtape as having a lasting effect on contemporary pop music and as presenting a new framework for music discovery; they also characterized it as a blueprint that prompted widespread imitation. Writing for Exclaim! in 2021, A. Harmony said that its dark production, explicit subject matter and anonymous release helped establish a space for alternative R&B. Harmony identified Bryson Tiller and 6lack among artists influenced by the mixtape, and H.E.R. and Sault among acts that adopted elements of its early mystique.

Critics have particularly emphasized the way Tesfaye combined R&B with electronic, indie-rock and dream-pop textures. Rolling Stone wrote that House of Balloons fused hip-hop, rock and pop, and singled out Usher and Rihanna as artists who found inspiration in the Weeknd after its release. In 2015, the magazine published a survey of songs it considered indebted to his sound, including recordings by Miguel, Usher, Dawn Richard, Justin Bieber, Jhené Aiko and Drake.

In a 2016 Vogue profile, Taylor Swift said that contemporary radio was "peppered with hints of production elements and vocal stylings" likely inspired by the Weeknd; the article also described the work of Zayn and Nick Jonas as indebted to him. Tove Lo likewise cited the Weeknd as "a big inspiration", saying that his work could be heard in the melodic character of some of her songs. In 2020, Diplo said the production of Usher's 2012 single "Climax" drew on the House of Balloons era, citing its "dark edges".

Tesfaye's influence continued into the 2020s through the retro-pop sound of After Hours and Dawn FM. LOS40 credited After Hours with helping popularize a renewed interest in 1980s pop that was subsequently pursued by artists including Dua Lipa and Miley Cyrus. Blinding Lights became a prominent example of this retro-modern approach; MusicRadar described it as the “ultimate ’80s-sounding hit” and noted that it synthesized multiple 1980s influences into an original contemporary-pop sound. Dawn FM broadened that palette through synth-pop, 1980s R&B and Japanese city pop, while retaining the darker vocal style critics associated with Tesfaye's earlier work.

Critics also connected later pop releases directly to the sound of After Hours. Reviewing Ed Sheeran's 2021 single "Bad Habits", The Guardian wrote that its primary influence appeared to be After Hours, citing its glossy update of 1980s dance-pop and its lyrical treatment of compulsive hedonism. Reviewing Tory Lanez's 2021 album Alone at Prom, AllMusic's Andy Kellman similarly described its synthesizer-driven retro-contemporary style as being "in the vein of" After Hours.

Critics also used "Blinding Lights" as a reference point for subsequent pop singles. Stereogum described the Kid Laroi and Justin Bieber's 2021 single "Stay" as effectively recasting "Blinding Lights" with a more overtly heart-on-sleeve style. Reviewing Harry Styles' 2022 single "As It Was", The Guardian likewise compared its 1980s-inflected melody with the explicit neon-pop aesthetic of "Blinding Lights", while distinguishing Styles's song as a broader blend of influences.

=== Persona and visual world-building ===
The Weeknd's early anonymity formed part of his artistic identity. The Fader wrote in 2020 that the construction of the Weeknd persona was as important as the music itself, tracing the persona's continuing hold over audiences to the world established on House of Balloons. Tesfaye said that he initially concealed his identity because he did not consider himself to have the conventional image of an R&B singer and wanted listeners to judge the music without preconceptions; he later said that the resulting mystery and mythology became part of the project's appeal. The project was initially released with little public information about Tesfaye, while its black-and-white cover, photographed by his creative director and XO co-founder La Mar Taylor, established an image that Taylor described as matching the project's "moody, debaucherous R&B sound".

Kiss Land marked an early expansion of this approach. Tesfaye described the 2013 album to Complex as a world he had created in his head to symbolize touring life, an unfamiliar experience after he had spent his life in Toronto. He characterized its narrative as foreign and Asian-inspired, with Japan serving as a central reference point. In a later interview with GQ, he recalled that touring and visiting Tokyo had exposed him to "all this new information". Tesfaye also cited filmmakers John Carpenter, David Cronenberg and Ridley Scott as influences, describing Kiss Land as akin to a horror film; in 2021, he told GQ that cinema had been his "first passion".

Tesfaye has also used changes in hairstyle, colour and costuming to distinguish creative eras. His tall, sculptural dreadlocks had become a defining part of his public image during the Beauty Behind the Madness period. For the rollout of Starboy in 2016, he replaced them with a closely cropped cut. Vogue described the new album portrait's red backdrop and altered appearance as signaling a new creative turn. Tesfaye later said that Starboy had "no real story", describing it instead as an attempt to expand on the success of Beauty Behind the Madness. Writing in 2016, The Guardian characterized the colour palette of his videos as cold blue and purple, and their visual motifs as drawing on horror cinema and softcore imagery.

During the After Hours era, Tesfaye appeared in a red blazer and progressively bloodied, bandaged makeup across music videos and televised performances. The visual campaign drew explicitly on cinema: in a 2020 GQ interview, Tesfaye cited films including Possession, Fear and Loathing in Las Vegas and Claire Denis's Trouble Every Day, as well as thrillers from the 1970s and 1980s, as touchstones for the videos. Director Alex Lill told Pitchfork that Tesfaye developed overarching album narratives and sought to connect individual appearances—including late-night television performances, awards shows and the Super Bowl LV halftime show—into them. Dawn FM extended this approach through an album-length radio-station concept: The Guardian described it as a broadcast from purgatory, with Jim Carrey serving as host and advertisements contributing to its fictional setting. Taylor has said that the creative team translates Tesfaye's ideas across recordings, stadium shows, film and televised performances, while Billboard Canada described the After Hours til Dawn Tour as a narrative-driven extension of After Hours, Dawn FM and Hurry Up Tomorrow. While promoting Hurry Up Tomorrow in 2025, Tesfaye described the Weeknd project as a "15-year film" and said that the film enabled him to give the persona a visual ending.

=== Critical reception and cultural footprint ===
Tesfaye was named to the 2020 Time 100. In an accompanying tribute, Elton John praised his "incredible imagination", describing the shifting personae of his music and presentation as central to his work and commending the range of influences he incorporated into a distinct artistic vision.

House of Balloons has received substantial retrospective recognition. It appeared on decade-end album lists by Pitchfork, Vice and Slant Magazine, and in 2025, Rolling Stone included it in its list of the 250 greatest albums of the 21st century so far; the magazine's entry described the mixtape as the standout in Tesfaye's catalogue despite his subsequent commercial success.

Tesfaye's visual work has also been adapted beyond recorded music and concert performance. In 2022, Universal Parks & Resorts presented The Weeknd: After Hours Nightmare, a haunted-house attraction at Universal Orlando Resort and Universal Studios Hollywood based on the music and imagery of After Hours. The following year, Universal Studios Singapore presented an expanded After Hours Til Dawn Nightmare attraction drawing on both After Hours and Dawn FM.

In March 2023, Guinness World Records described Tesfaye as the world's most popular artist after he set its record for the most monthly listeners on Spotify, with 111.4 million listeners at the time. Guinness also recognized him as the first artist to reach 100 million monthly listeners on the platform. "Blinding Lights" received separate retrospective recognition in November 2021, when Billboard named it the number-one song on its Greatest of All Time Hot 100 Songs chart. In 2024, Spotify hosted its inaugural Billions Club event in Santa Monica, California, an intimate performance commemorating Tesfaye's achievement of 21 songs earning 1 billion streams.

The City of Toronto awarded Tesfaye a Key to the City in July 2025, recognizing his artistic achievements and philanthropic impact. The city cited his connection to Scarborough, support for local institutions and co-founding of the Toronto creative hub HXOUSE; it also proclaimed July 26 and 27 "Weeknd Weekend".

== Controversies ==
=== Plagiarism allegations ===
In December 2015, Tesfaye was sued by Cutting Edge Music, which alleged that the bassline for "The Hills" had been taken from a composition featured in the score for the 2013 science fiction film The Machine. One of the producers of the song was alleged to have sent a private Twitter message to Tom Raybould, the composer of the film's score, stating that he had sampled the composition. The lawsuit was dismissed in March 2016, with legal reporting indicating that the parties appeared to have reached a settlement. In April 2025, Cutting Edge filed another copyright infringement lawsuit against Tesfaye and several of his collaborators and music companies, again alleging that "The Hills" copied elements of the score for The Machine.

In September 2018, Tesfaye and Daft Punk were sued by Ethiopian-American singer and songwriter Yasmin Mohamed, who alleged that "Starboy" infringed on her work. Tesfaye denied the allegations.

In April 2019, Tesfaye was sued by British songwriters William Smith, Brian Clover, and Scott McCulloch, who alleged that his song "A Lonely Night" infringed on their song "I Need to Love". In July 2020, a federal court granted summary judgment in favor of Tesfaye and his collaborators, finding that the plaintiffs had failed to establish a genuine dispute concerning the defendants' access to their song or substantial similarity between the protectable elements of the two works. In October 2021, the United States Court of Appeals for the Ninth Circuit affirmed the decision.

In February 2020, Tesfaye and Kendrick Lamar were sued by the now-defunct indie band Yeasayer, which alleged that "Pray for Me" included an unauthorized sample of their song "Sunrise". Yeasayer voluntarily dismissed the lawsuit later that year.

In September 2021, Tesfaye, Nicolás Jaar, and Frank Dukes were sued for copyright infringement by producers Suniel Fox and Henry Strange, who alleged that "Call Out My Name" was "strikingly [or] substantially similar, if not identical" to their song "Vibeking". In March 2023, the parties reached a settlement, the terms of which were not publicly disclosed.

=== Allegations of homophobic lyrics ===
In January 2019, Tesfaye faced criticism over lyrics in his and Gesaffelstein's single "Lost in the Fire". Critics and social media users described lines in the song's second verse as homophobic or biphobic, arguing that they dismissed same-sex attraction as a "phase", fetishized relationships between women, and invoked the idea that a person's sexual orientation could be changed through sex.

The criticism focused particularly on the lyric "While I fuck you straight", which commentators interpreted as invoking the idea that lesbian or bisexual women could be "turned straight". While Tesfaye did not respond directly to the criticism at the time, many speculate that he later referenced the controversy in the lyrics to his song "Snowchild", saying, "Every month, another accusation. Only thing I'm phobic of is failing".

=== Public disputes ===
==== Drake ====
Tesfaye and Drake were early collaborators from Toronto. In 2010, Drake's October's Very Own blog promoted several of Tesfaye's early songs, and the two subsequently collaborated on Tesfaye's mixtape Thursday and Drake's 2011 album Take Care. Tesfaye received writing and vocal credits on several songs from Take Care.

In 2012, Drake indicated that he was interested in signing Tesfaye to his OVO Sound imprint, although Tesfaye ultimately signed with Republic Records. The decision prompted media speculation about a rift between the two, although Drake later denied that several of his songs were directed at Tesfaye and stated that he had no hard feelings about Tesfaye's decision. In a 2013 interview, Tesfaye discussed contributing material to Take Care that had originally been intended for his own music, while also describing Drake as his closest friend in the music industry at the time and expressing gratitude for his early support.

The two continued to collaborate publicly during the following years. In 2017, Drake brought Tesfaye out during OVO Fest, where they performed together and Drake expressed interest in a future collaborative OVOXO project. Later that year, reports emerged of possible tension between the two amid rumors that Drake had been romantically involved with Tesfaye's former girlfriend, model Bella Hadid.

In January 2019, Tesfaye appeared on Gesaffelstein's song "Lost in the Fire". Media outlets interpreted lyrics from the song as possible references to Drake's son and to the rumors concerning Drake and Hadid. Later that year, Drake released the song "War", whose lyrics were widely interpreted as indicating that the two had resolved their differences.

In November 2020, Drake publicly defended Tesfaye following his exclusion from the nominations for the 63rd Annual Grammy Awards. The two appeared publicly together again in February 2022, when Drake attended Tesfaye's birthday celebration and referred to their relationship as a reunited "family". However, Drake then appeared to direct a subliminal at Tesfaye on "All the Parties," a track from his album For All the Dogs in 2023.

Their apparent tensions escalated in 2024 amid Drake's wider conflicts with Future, Metro Boomin, and Kendrick Lamar. Tesfaye appeared on Future and Metro Boomin's collaborative album We Still Don't Trust You, released on April 12, on the song "All to Myself". Media outlets interpreted the song's lyrics as references to Drake and Tesfaye's previous decision not to sign with OVO Sound.

Drake subsequently addressed Tesfaye on the diss track "Push Ups", which also targeted several other artists involved in the broader conflict. He addressed Tesfaye again on "Family Matters". Tesfaye subsequently attended The Pop Out: Ken & Friends concert in June 2024. In November 2024, Drake publicly criticized Tesfaye during a livestream, asking for his song "Starboy" to be turned off and stating that "real 6ixers" did not listen to it.

==== Justin Bieber ====
In January 2017, a public dispute emerged between Tesfaye and Justin Bieber after Tesfaye began dating Bieber's former girlfriend, singer Selena Gomez. When asked whether he listened to Tesfaye's music, Bieber responded that he did not and described it as "whack". The following month, Bieber appeared to mock Tesfaye's song "Starboy" during an Instagram Live broadcast.

Tesfaye subsequently appeared on Canadian rapper Nav's song "Some Way". Media outlets interpreted several lyrics from the song as a response to Bieber and his relationship with Gomez. The public dispute subsequently received little further attention.

==== Usher ====
In April 2020, Tesfaye discussed the influence of his 2011 mixtape House of Balloons on contemporary music during an interview with Variety. Referring to Usher's 2012 single "Climax", Tesfaye stated that he initially thought the song was "a Weeknd song" and said that he had been both flattered and angered by its perceived similarity to his early work.

Usher's collaborator Eric Bellinger, subsequently promoted the "#ClimaxChallenge" on social media, challenging Tesfaye to perform the song to demonstrate whether he could reproduce its high notes, while Usher posted videos of himself singing "Climax". Usher also appeared to respond indirectly to the controversy by tweeting, "Have you ever seen the moon bark back at the dog?" Media outlets interpreted the message as a response to Tesfaye's remarks.

Diplo, who produced "Climax", subsequently stated that Tesfaye's early music had influenced his approach to the song's production. However, the song's co-producer and co-writer Ariel Rechtshaid disputed that "Climax" had been influenced by Tesfaye's music.

Tesfaye subsequently clarified that his comments had been taken out of context, describing Usher as "a King and always an inspiration". In August 2020, Tesfaye stated that he had contacted Usher to apologize for the misunderstanding and denied that a feud had existed between them. In 2026, Bellinger questioned the Weeknd's ability to perform the high notes in Usher's song, saying, "I ain't never heard you up there, champ."

=== 2021 Grammys snub ===
Following the announcement of the nominations for the 63rd Annual Grammy Awards in November 2020, Tesfaye received no nominations despite the commercial and critical success of his album After Hours and its single "Blinding Lights". The absence of any nominations was widely described by music critics and publications as one of the ceremony's most notable snubs. Tesfaye subsequently accused the Grammys of corruption, writing on Twitter, "The Grammys remain corrupt. You owe me, my fans and the industry transparency...".

Reports subsequently indicated that Tesfaye's team and the Recording Academy had held discussions about a possible performance at the ceremony while he was also preparing to perform at the Super Bowl LV halftime show. A source close to Tesfaye's team alleged that disagreements over the scheduling of the two performances had complicated the negotiations. Harvey Mason Jr., the Recording Academy's chair and interim president and chief executive officer at the time, denied that Tesfaye's Super Bowl performance could have affected the nomination process, stating that voting had concluded before the performance was announced.

In January 2021, Tesfaye described the snub as a "sucker punch" and said that he had been confused by the outcome after being widely told that his work was expected to receive nominations. He questioned the Recording Academy's record regarding Black artists in the Album of the Year category, while stating that he did not want to make the controversy solely about himself. He later stated that his three Grammy Awards "mean nothing to me now" and said that he was willing to face criticism if doing so could help prevent a similar situation from occurring again.

In March 2021, Tesfaye announced that he would boycott the Grammy Awards and would no longer allow his record label to submit his music for consideration, citing the Academy's anonymous nomination review committees, which he referred to as "secret committees".

The following month, the Recording Academy announced changes to its nomination process, including the elimination of the nomination review committees for most categories and a shift toward nominations determined by votes from the Academy's wider voting membership. The Academy stated that the changes had been under consideration before the controversy surrounding Tesfaye's exclusion and were not a direct response to his boycott.

Tesfaye described the elimination of the committees as "an important start" but announced that he would continue his boycott, stating that trust between artists and the Grammy organization had been broken for too long and that he remained uninterested in submitting his music for consideration.

In February 2025, Tesfaye ended his years-long boycott of the Grammy Awards with a surprise performance at the 67th Annual Grammy Awards. Before introducing him, Recording Academy chief executive officer Harvey Mason Jr. acknowledged Tesfaye's previous criticism of the organization and highlighted changes that the Academy had made to its membership and voting procedures. Tesfaye subsequently performed "Cry for Me" and "Timeless", marking his first appearance at the ceremony since 2017.

Later that year, Tesfaye's record label resumed submitting his music for Grammy consideration. His album Hurry Up Tomorrow and several of its songs were submitted in multiple categories for the 68th Annual Grammy Awards, marking his first Grammy submissions since announcing his boycott in 2021. Despite the submissions, he received no nominations.

=== The Idol allegations ===
In March 2023, Rolling Stone published a report based on interviews with 13 sources connected to the production of the HBO drama series The Idol, which Tesfaye co-created, co-wrote, and starred in alongside Sam Levinson. The report described alleged production difficulties following the departure of the series' original director, Amy Seimetz, and a subsequent creative overhaul. Sources interviewed by the magazine alleged that the revised version placed greater emphasis on explicit sexual content and included material they characterized as resembling "sexual torture porn" and a "rape fantasy". The report also cited sources who alleged that Tesfaye had been dissatisfied with the original direction of the series, including its perceived "female perspective".

HBO disputed the report's characterization of the production, stating that the series' initial approach had not met the network's standards and that the subsequent creative changes had been made in the interests of the production and its cast and crew. The network stated that the creative team had remained committed to maintaining a "safe, collaborative and mutually respectful working environment". Actress Lily-Rose Depp, who starred in the series, similarly defended the production, stating that she had felt supported and that her input and opinions had been valued during the creative process.

Tesfaye responded to the report by posting a clip from The Idol in which his character described Rolling Stone as "a little irrelevant", accompanying it with the caption "@RollingStone did we upset you?" In a subsequent interview with Vanity Fair, he said that he considered the report "ridiculous" and had intended his response to be similarly "ridiculous".

Tesfaye disputed the characterization of Seimetz's departure and the creative overhaul. He stated that he had enjoyed working with Seimetz and attributed the changes to logistical difficulties involving production timelines and her schedule, as well as his desire not to rush his first television series. Addressing speculation that the overhaul had been motivated by a desire for a more prominent role, he maintained that the series remained centered on Depp's character and said that he had initially been reluctant to play Tedros.

During the series' release, Tesfaye also rejected interpretations that his character, Tedros, was intended to be romanticized. He described the character as a "pathetic scumbag" and stated that he wanted audiences to be disgusted by him rather than view him as seductive or aspirational.

In later interviews, Tesfaye reflected more critically on the series. In January 2025, he said that he remained proud of the cast and crew while acknowledging that the story of The Idol "could have been told in a different way". In May 2025, Tesfaye said that criticism of the series "makes a lot of sense" and described the production as having "too many cooks in the kitchen". He attributed some of the project's difficulties to repeated changes in its format and to competing creative voices, stating that the production had reached a point where everyone was attempting to "get to the finish line" and that "you can't force something". He described the resulting series as "half-baked" and said that, despite being involved in the writing and production, he had been reluctant to exert greater creative influence because of concerns about being perceived as "difficult" in Hollywood. Tesfaye nevertheless said that he remained proud of the "leap of faith" taken by those involved in the series.

== Other ventures ==
=== Endorsements and investments ===
In 2013, Tesfaye collaborated with condom company ONE to give away limited-edition condoms at his shows during the Kiss Land Fall Tour. In November 2015, he partnered with electronic vaporizer company Pax Labs to release a limited edition vaporizer. He also collaborated with fashion designer Alexander Wang for an apparel collection. In 2016, Tesfaye became a creative collaborator and global brand ambassador for the clothing brand Puma. With the partnership, he released numerous capsule collections and hosted several pop-up retail stores.

In 2017, Tesfaye partnered with retail company H&M for their men's collection. He cut ties with the company in 2018, following a racist incident within the company. In July 2018, Tesfaye collaborated with Marvel Comics to release a comic book and limited merchandise collection inspired by his third studio album Starboy. In August, he released an apparel collection in collaboration with A Bathing Ape. A second collection was released in January 2020.

In April 2019, Tesfaye became an owner and global ambassador of the esports company OverActive Media, who owns the Splyce and Overwatch League team Toronto Defiant. On August 31, 2020, Tesfaye partnered with TD Bank to launch Black HXOUSE, an entrepreneurial initiative within the incubator HXOUSE, where he serves as a sleeping partner. On September 9, Canadian Prime Minister Justin Trudeau announced a CA$221,000,000 joint venture with HXOUSE for Black Canadian entrepreneurs. In March 2021, Tesfaye auctioned a collection of visual artwork and an unreleased song in the form of a non-fungible token (NFT) on Nifty Gateway. In October, he joined football player Tom Brady's NFT platform Autograph as a member of their board of directors. In December 2021, an NFT collection commemorating the record-breaking performance of Tesfaye's song, "Blinding Lights", on the Billboard Hot 100 was created in a partnership with OpenSea, Billboard and Autograph.

In 2022, Tesfaye invested in plant-based beverage brand Koia. Since 2023, Tesfaye, in partnership with Blue Bottle Coffee launched Samra Origins, a specialty coffee brand inspired by his Ethiopian heritage and which he named after his mother. A new coffee blend collection (the "Togetherness Blend") in collaboration with Nespresso was released in 2025. The same year, he partnered with Roblox to launch a limited avatar collection, as well as French football club Paris Saint-Germain FC to launch a limited capsule collection and kits under the XO branding, and Canadian baseball team Toronto Blue Jays for a limited merch collaboration during the 2025 World Series. In December 2025, Tesfaye secured a $1 billion deal with Lyric Capital, placing his music catalogue in a joint venture and allowing him "freedom to utilize the publishing and masters' rights over the catalog." On January 22, 2026, HXOUSE announced a partnership with Point Park University to launch their "Creative Direction Credential Program", providing education for young artists in Pittsburgh, which began in March.

==== XO ====
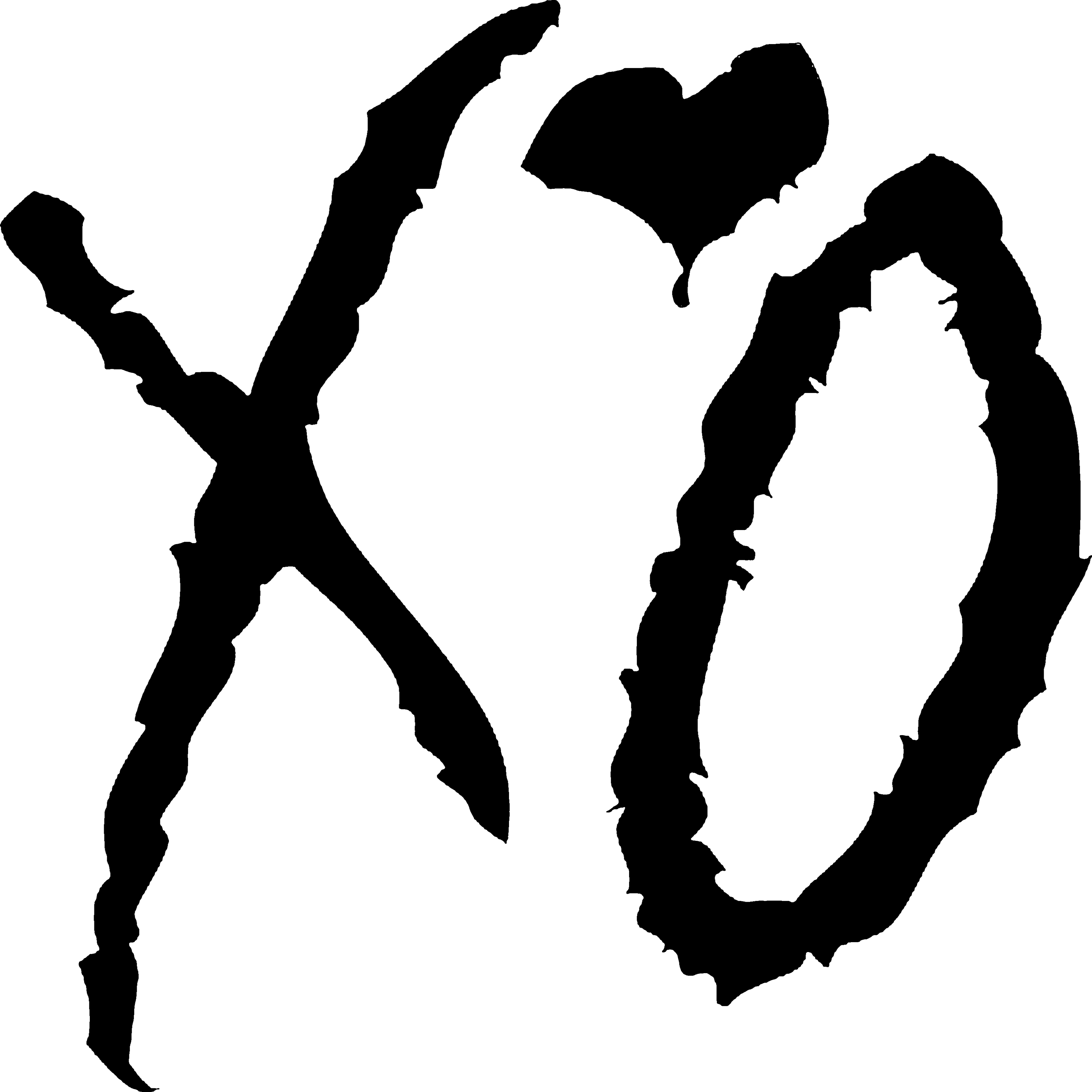
The logo for Tesfaye's record label XO

In 2011, Tesfaye co-founded with managers Wassim Slaiby and Amir Esmailian, as well as creative friend La Mar Taylor, the XO record label. Its motto is "XO 'Til We Overdose" and has been frequently associated with OVO Sound, Drake's record label, of which the partnership has been sometimes labelled as "OVOXO". "XO", sometimes used as an emoticon for hugs and kisses, may refer to Tesfaye's recreational use of ecstasy and oxycodone. Tesfaye would later use the word as a suffix for his given name on social media (AbelXO). Artists signed to XO include the Weeknd himself, Belly, Nav, and Chxrry, while 88Glam and Black Atlass were previously signed to the label. As of 2025, the label has eight number-one albums on the Billboard 200: six albums by the Weeknd and two albums by Nav.

==== Memento Mori ====
In June 2018, Tesfaye created the radio show Memento Mori under Apple Music 1 (then known as Beats 1). The show, which featured numerous guest artists, featured songs that inspired Tesfaye's album during recording processes. The guests would also make curated playlists and host their own episodes. The first episode, aired on June 8, featured songs that were inspired by "some very memorable nights." Tesfaye was at the time living in Paris when airing the first episode. Campaigns for After Hours and Dawn FM were also aired on Memento Mori. For the former campaign, the ninth episode that aired on August 13, 2020, was made to celebrate Tesfaye's debut album Kiss Land (2013). These include unreleased tracks that did not make part of the final release and a Lana Del Rey collaboration, as well as a track that would later be released as "Another One of Me" with Diddy.

== Philanthropy ==
After being presented with a Bikila Award for Professional Excellence in 2014, Tesfaye donated CA$50,000 to the University of Toronto to fund a new course on Ge'ez, the classic language of Ethiopia. In May 2016, during Orthodox Easter, Tesfaye donated CA$50,000 to the St. Mary Ethiopian Orthodox Tewahedo Cathedral in Toronto, Canada, a church he attended growing up. In August 2016, he funded a new Ethiopian studies program at the University of Toronto. That same month, Tesfaye donated US$250,000 to the Black Lives Matter Global Network Foundation following numerous reports of police brutality in the United States. In June 2017, Tesfaye donated US$100,000 to the Suubi Health Center, a maternity and children's medical facility in Budondo, Uganda. He was inspired to support the center after learning of French Montana's work with Global Citizen and Mama Hope to help raise awareness for Suubi and the people of Uganda.

In April 2020, Tesfaye launched a line of non-medical face masks with all of the proceeds going to the MusiCares COVID-19 Relief Fund, a campaign launched by the Recording Academy to help musicians affected by the COVID-19 pandemic. In addition, Tesfaye donated US$500,000 to MusiCares and CA$500,000 to the Scarborough Health Network. In May 2020, in response to the murder of George Floyd and the protests that followed, Tesfaye donated US$500,000 to the Black Lives Matter Global Network Foundation, Colin Kaepernick's Know Your Rights Camp, and the National Bail Out. He then urged other music executives, major record labels, and streaming services to donate to the cause as well.

On August 7, 2020, Tesfaye held the "Weeknd Experience", an interactive virtual concert on the social media platform TikTok that drew two million total viewers, including 275,000 concurrent viewers. The concert raised over US$350,000 for the Equal Justice Initiative. He also donated US$300,000 to Global Aid for Lebanon in support of victims of the Beirut explosion. On November 2, the University of Toronto announced that it was able to reach and surpass its fundraising goal of CA$500,000 for its Ethiopic program, which included a CA$30,000 donation from Tesfaye. In May 2021, he was among the celebrities expressing more solidarity for civilians who died during the 2021 Israel–Palestine crisis. On September 23, Tesfaye was honored with the Quincy Jones Humanitarian Award at the inaugural Music in Action Awards, presented by the Black Music Action Coalition. On January 9, 2024, Tesfaye partnered with the non-profit organization School on Wheels Inc. to support more than 1,000 students experiencing homelessness. To coincide with his concert in Brazil, Tesfaye released merchandise and will donate 10% of the net profits to the Brazilian Soul Fund of BrazilFoundation. In 2026 Tesfaye participated in an international charity auction providing medical and emergency supplies for displaced families in Sudan.

=== WFP ambassadorship ===
On April 4, 2021, Tesfaye announced a US$1,000,000 donation through the United Nations World Food Programme (WFP) to relief efforts in Ethiopia for people affected by the Tigray War. On June 9, he met with the administrator of the United States Agency for International Development, Samantha Power, to discuss the humanitarian crisis of the Tigray War. Tesfaye was appointed as a UN Goodwill Ambassador for the World Food Programme on October 7.

On March 3, 2022, he partnered with the WFP to launch the XO Humanitarian Fund. Through the fund, Tesfaye was to donate US$1 from every ticket sold at his After Hours til Dawn Tour, in addition to a US$500,000 donation, to the WFP. $2,500,000 from the XO Humanitarian Fund was directed toward WFP's humanitarian response efforts in the Gaza Strip, providing four million emergency meals for those affected by the Israeli invasion of the Gaza Strip. On April 29, 2024, Tesfaye announced another $2 million donation to the WFP to provide loaves of bread in Gaza. On January 17, 2025, it was announced that Tesfaye had pledged a further $1 million to support relief efforts in the Southern California wildfires. In November 2025, he announced a donation of $350,000 in support of the WFP's response to Hurricane Melissa. In 2026 it was announced that Tesfaye had once again partnered with WFP and would be directing a portion of the proceeds from his tour legs in Latin America and Europe to the XO Humanitarian Fund.

== Personal life ==
Tesfaye has generally sought to keep his personal life out of the public eye. In a 2018 interview with Time, he attributed his reluctance to give interviews to nervousness, saying that he would feel uncomfortable appearing in a live television interview. He also described feeling as though someone was watching him, which contributed to his decision to live in a more secluded area of Los Angeles. In May 2025, Tesfaye told Variety that fame could be a "full-time job", adding that he had no interest in treating it as one.

Tesfaye's father left the family when he was very young. In a 2015 interview with Rolling Stone, Tesfaye said that he had seen his father only twice during his childhood, first briefly when he was about six and again when he was 11 or 12, by which time his father had a new family. He said that he did not resent his father, but described him as having been absent from his upbringing. He said in 2025 that he had found father figures in friendships and in a stepfather who entered his life later.

Tesfaye was raised in the Ethiopian Orthodox Tewahedo Church, grew up listening to Ethiopian music at home, and spoke Amharic as his first language. He has said that the tone and rhythm of Amharic, as well as Ethiopian music, influenced his vocal style and vibrato. In a 2020 interview, he said that he had been raised very religiously but expressed uncertainty about whether he remained religious as an adult.

Tesfaye has described cinema as a major personal interest. In a 2023 interview with Interview, he discussed the importance of film to his artistic interests and the influence of films on his music videos. In the same interview, he publicly disclosed that he has attention deficit hyperactivity disorder (ADHD).

Tesfaye is an avid video game enthusiast. He has cited the influence of Grand Theft Auto: Vice City on his musical tastes, recalling that playing the game as a child introduced him to music by artists such as Hall & Oates and Michael Jackson. In 2026, he discussed his interest in games including Elden Ring and the Persona series, and met with the developers of the independent game About Fishing to discuss its design.

Tesfaye's relationships have attracted substantial media and paparazzi attention. From April 2015 to August 2019, Tesfaye was in an on-again, off-again relationship with American model Bella Hadid. Hadid appeared in the music video for his 2015 single "In the Night". Tesfaye dated American singer and actress Selena Gomez from January to October 2017. The release of his 2018 EP My Dear Melancholy, prompted media speculation that its lyrics referred to his relationships with Gomez and Hadid; The Washington Post and Vanity Fair identified lyrics they interpreted as alluding to the two women. In 2025, Tesfaye said that the EP had felt "more personal again" and allowed him to focus on "the heartbreak side, the vulnerable side", but declined to identify a particular breakup as its inspiration. In a 2018 interview with Time, Tesfaye declined to discuss the specifics of his relationships, saying that he did not want to "open that Pandora's box". In 2022, he was publicly linked to Saudi-born DJ Simi Khadra, with whom he was photographed at public events in subsequent years.

In January 2015, Tesfaye was arrested in Las Vegas after police alleged that he punched an officer who was intervening in a fight. In October 2015, he pleaded no contest to a misdemeanor battery charge and avoided jail time under an agreement that required him to complete community service and fulfil other conditions. In a 2020 interview, he described the period surrounding his early rise to fame as a "real rock-star era" that he was "not really proud of". He also connected the sirens at the end of his song "Faith" to the arrest.

In August 2022, Tesfaye cancelled a concert at SoFi Stadium in Inglewood, California, after losing his voice during the performance of his opening song. In a 2025 interview with The Guardian, he said that he later learned he had been experiencing a panic attack rather than a physical injury. The concert was rescheduled, and he attributed the episode in part to the demands of touring while simultaneously filming the television series The Idol.

Tesfaye has discussed changes in his substance use over the course of his career. In a 2021 interview with GQ, he described himself as "sober lite", saying that he had stopped using hard drugs while continuing to use marijuana and drink alcohol occasionally. In 2025, he said that earlier in his career he had sometimes relied on alcohol to manage nerves and anxiety about performing.

== Accolades ==
Tesfaye has won four Grammy Awards, a Latin Grammy Award, twenty Billboard Music Awards, six American Music Awards, three MTV Video Music Awards and twenty-two Juno Awards. He has also received nominations for an Academy Award and a Primetime Emmy Award.

In October 2014, Tesfaye was awarded the Allan Slaight Honour by Canada's Walk of Fame for "making a positive impact in the fields of music, film, literature, visual or performing arts, sports, innovation or philanthropy". Toronto mayor John Tory announced that the city would observe February 7, 2021, as the Weeknd Day to commemorate Tesfaye's Super Bowl halftime performance.

== Discography ==
Studio albums

- Kiss Land (2013)
- Beauty Behind the Madness (2015)
- Starboy (2016)
- After Hours (2020)
- Dawn FM (2022)
- Hurry Up Tomorrow (2025)

== Filmography ==
- Uncut Gems (2019)
- The Show (2021)
- Live at SoFi Stadium (2023)
- The Idol (2023)
- Hurry Up Tomorrow (2025)

== Tours ==
Headlining

- The Fall Tour (2012)
- The Kiss Land Fall Tour (2013)
- King of the Fall Tour (2014)
- The Madness Fall Tour (2015)
- Starboy: Legend of the Fall Tour (2017)
- The Weeknd Asia Tour (2018)
- After Hours til Dawn Tour (2022–2026)

Supporting

- Florence and the Machine – Ceremonials Tour (2012)
- Justin Timberlake – The 20/20 Experience World Tour (2013)
- Drake – Would You Like a Tour? (2014)

Current touring musicians

- Ricky Lewis – drums (2011–present)
- Patrick Greenaway – lead guitar, backing vocals (2012–present), synthesizer (2020–present), keyboards (2022–present)

Former touring musicians

- Adrian "Adrian X" Eccleston – lead guitar (2011)
- Hill Kourkoutis – bass, keyboards (2011)
- Nathaniel James – bass, keyboards (2012)
- Daniel Jones – keyboards (2012–2013; died 2023)
- Jonathan "Jonny Goood" Drummond – bass, keyboards (2012–2013)
- Kelly Wolfgramm – backing vocals (2012–2013)
- Muhsinah – backing vocals (2012–2013)
- Ledaris "LJ" Jones – bass, keyboards, synthesizer (2013–2022)
- Mike Dean – synthesizer, guitar, keyboards, saxophone (2022 (Note: Guest musician during the Weeknd's co-headlining Coachella performance); 2023–2025)

== See also ==
- List of most-streamed artists on Spotify
