= Bazooka (disambiguation) =

A bazooka is an anti-tank rocket-launcher weapon.

Bazooka may also refer to:

== People ==
- Mohamed Abdel Razek, Egyptian footballer nicknamed "Bazoka" or "Bazooka"
- Wilfredo Gómez, Puerto Rican boxer nicknamed "Bazooka"
- Rafael Limón, Mexican boxer nicknamed "Bazooka"
- Ike Quartey, Ghanaian boxer nicknamed "Bazooka"

== Arts, entertainment, and media ==
=== Fictional characters ===
- Bazooka (G.I. Joe), a fictional character in the G.I. Joe universe
- Bazooka (Transformers), a character from the anime Beast Wars Neo

=== Films ===
- Bazooka (film), a 2025 Malayalam film

=== Music ===
==== Groups and labels ====
- Bazooka (band), a jazz music group

==== Albums ====
- Bazooka, an album by Pat Travers & Carmine Appice

==== Other uses in music ====
- Bazooka (instrument), the musical instrument after which the weapon was named
- "Bazooka" (song), a 2025 song by Miami XO
- "Bazooka", a 2014 song by Firebeatz
- "Bazooka", a 2020 song by GWSN

== Business ==
- Bazooka (chewing gum), a brand of chewing gum
- Bazooka Mobile Audio, the trade name and product line of mobile audio manufacturer Southern Audio Services

== See also ==
- Bazooka Joe, the comic character advertising the chewing gum brand
- Anti-Coercion Instrument, a European Union regulation called the trade bazooka
- Bazuka, a United States R&B music group
