= XO =

Xo or XO may refer to:

== Arts, media, and entertainment ==
- Super Robot Wars XO, a 2006 tactical role-playing video game
- XO Group, a media company
- X-O Manowar, a Valiant Comics superhero
- Xiomara "Xo" Villanueva, a character on Jane the Virgin, an American satirical telenovela

=== Music ===
- XO (group), British girl group
- XO (record label), founded by the Weeknd
- Miami XO, American rapper
- XO (Elliott Smith album), 1998
- XO (Leathermouth album), 2009

==== Songs ====
- "XO" (song), 2013, by Beyoncé from her self-titled studio album
- "XO", 2005, by Fall Out Boy from the album From Under the Cork Tree
- "XO", 2010, by Mike Posner from the album 31 Minutes to Takeoff
- "XO", 2015, by The Eden Project
- "XO", 2022, by girl group Citizen Queen
- "Xo", 2022, by Stand Atlantic from the album F.E.A.R.
- "XO (Only If You Say Yes)", by K-pop boy group Enhypen
- "X.O.", 1996, by Luniz from the film soundtrack Original Gangstas
- "XO / The Host", 2011, by the Weeknd from his third mixtape Echoes of Silence

== Food and drink ==
- XO sauce, a spicy seafood-based dressing sauce
- XO (extra old), a grade of cognac liquor

== Science and technology ==
- XO Telescope or its exo-planet survey
- Xylenol orange, a chemical indicator for metal ions, used in titrations

=== Computing and electronics ===
- OLPC XO, a laptop produced by the One Laptop per Child association
- XO Communications, a telecom company
- Crystal oscillator (deprecated abbreviation: XO), an electronic circuit

=== Biology ===
- XO sex determination system, a chromosomal system used to designate sex of some species of insects, arachnids, and mammals
  - XO, heterogametic male designation under this system
- Turner syndrome, a genetic condition in which one of the sex chromosomes is absent
- Xanthine oxidase, an enzyme that catalyzes the oxidation of hypoxanthine to xanthine

== Other uses ==
- Executive officer or XO, as in a military or police force
- Hugs and kisses or XO
- LTE International Airways's IATA airline code

== See also ==
- Chi Omega ("ΧΩ"), a National Panhellenic Conference women's fraternity
- Executive order (disambiguation), an edict by a member of the executive branch of a government
- Exo (disambiguation), multiple terms
- OX (disambiguation)
- Tic-tac-toe, a game using X's and O's
- X's and O's (disambiguation)
- Xbox One (XBO), a video game console by Microsoft
- XOXO (disambiguation)
