= XOXO (disambiguation) =

XOXO refers to hugs and kisses, a way to express affection.

XOXO may also refer to:

== Music ==
- XOXO (Exo album), 2013
- XOXO (The Jayhawks album), 2020
- XOXO (Jeon Somi album), 2021
  - "XOXO" (song), by Jeon Somi
- XOXO (CNCO album), 2022
- XOXO (Onewe album), 2023
- XOXO, a 2011 album by Casper
- "X.O.X.O.", a song by Miliyah Kato from the 2010 album Heaven
- "xoxo", a 2011 digital single from Humming Urban Stereo
- "XOXO", a song by Ayumi Hamasaki from her 2014 album Colours
- "XOXO (Kisses Hugs)", a song by 6arelyhuman
- XOXO Entertainment, a Thai record label

== Other uses ==
- XOXO (brand), a contemporary brand of clothing and accessories geared toward teenage girls
- XOXO (festival), an arts and technology festival and conference held annually in September in Portland, Oregon
- XOXO (microformat) or eXtensible Open XHTML Outlines, an XML microformat for outlines built on top of XHTML
- XOXO (film), an American drama and music film
- Xoxo, Cape Verde
- Santa Cruz Xoxocotlán, Mexico, commonly referred to as "Xoxo"

== See also ==
- XOXO, Panda and the New Kid Revival, a 2008 album by Her Space Holiday
- "XXXO", a 2010 song by M.I.A.
- "XOXOXO", a song by The Black Eyed Peas from the 2010 album The Beginning
- XO (disambiguation)
- X's and O's (disambiguation)
