= Ecto =

Ecto may refer to:

- Ecto, a medical prefix meaning outer or outside
- Ecto (album), by Happy Rhodes, 1987
- Ecto (software), a weblog client

== See also ==
- Endo (disambiguation)
- Exo (disambiguation)
- Ectoderm, in biology, the outermost tissue layer
- Ectoplasm (cell biology), the outer part of the cytoplasm
- Ectotherm, in biology, a cold-blooded animal
