= X's and O's =

X's and O's, Exes and Ohs, Ex's and Oh's, and other variants in spelling of that phrase may refer to:

- Xs and Os, another name for the game Tic-tac-toe

== Music ==
- "Ex's and Oh's" (Atreyu song), 2006
- "Ex's & Oh's", a 2014 song by Elle King
- "XXX's and OOO's (An American Girl)", a 1994 song by Trisha Yearwood

== Multimedia ==
- Exes & Ohs, a 2007 Canadian/American cable TV series

== See also ==
- XO (disambiguation)
- XOXO (disambiguation)
- Tic Tac Toe (disambiguation)
