= Exo (disambiguation) =

Exo is a South Korean–Chinese boy band.

Exo or EXO may also refer to:

- exo-, a medical prefix denotes something as "outside" another
- Exo (album), a 2012 album by Gatekeeper
- Exo (novel), a novel in the Jumper series by Steven Gould
- Exo (public transit), a regional public transit agency in greater Montreal, Canada
- Exo Inc., a company that makes protein bars using flour made from crickets
- Enriched Xenon Observatory (EXO), a particle physics experiment
- Exo, a 2017 novel by Fonda Lee
- The Exo Building, an office building in Dublin, Ireland.
- EXO, a song by Magdalena Bay from their mixtape Mini Mix Vol. 3

== See also ==
- Ecto (disambiguation)
- Endo (disambiguation)
- XO (disambiguation)
- Exoplanet, a planet outside the Solar System
- Exoskeleton, an external skeleton that supports and protects an animal's body
- endo-exo isomerism, a characteristic of some organic compounds
