= Koia =

Plant-based protein drink brand

- Product type: Plant-based beverages Supplements
- Current owner: Chris Hunter; Maya French; Dustin Baker
- Produced by: Drinkwel, LLC
- Country: United States
- Introduced: 2013; 13 years ago
- Markets: United States
- Tagline: "Love Your Protein"
- Website: drinkkoia.com

Koia is a plant-based protein drink brand started by Maya French, Chris Fanucchi and Dustin Baker in the Chicago-area in 2013. It has many investors, such as The Weeknd, Chris Paul, and Cordae. In 2016, beverage industry veteran Chris Hunter became a cofounder and CEO. In 2019, French was listed on Forbes' 30 Under 30 list for her role in cofounding the company. Her lactose intolerance was a motivating factor for making vegan products. Koia is sold in many popular stores, including Starbucks, Whole Foods, Walmart, and 7-Eleven.
