= Endo =

Endo may refer to:

- Endo (band), an American nu-metal band
- Endō, a Japanese surname
- Endo contractualization, a term for short-term employment in the Philippines
- Endo International, a company specializing in drugs for pain management
- Endo people, an ethnic group in Kenya
  - Endo language, the native language of the Endo people
- Endō Shōta, a Japanese former professional Sumo wrestler
- Ex parte Endo, a 1944 US Supreme Court decision
- Endo-01 a fictional animatronic in Five Nights at Freddy's

== As a prefix ==
Endo, a prefix from Greek ἔνδον endon meaning "within, inner, absorbing, or containing"

- Endocannibalism, a practice of eating the flesh of a dead human being from the same community.
- Endodontics, field of dentistry
- Endogamy, the practice of marrying within a specific ethnic group, class, or social group
- Endogeneity (disambiguation), the property of being influenced within a system
- Endogenous, meaning "proceeding from within"; in biology, used to describe substances that originate from within an organism, tissue, or cell
- Endometriosis, a disease that relates to a person's internal organs
- Endomorphism, in mathematics, a homomorphism from a mathematical object to itself
- Endoscope, an implement used in minimally invasive surgery
- Endoskeleton, skeleton within the creature as opposed to an exoskeleton like that of crabs.
- Endo-exo isomerism, in chemistry, a specific stereochemical relationship in molecular geometry
- For other uses, see

== As an acronym, abbreviation or nickname ==
- ENDO, name of the annual meeting and conference of The Endocrine Society
- Endo, short for 'endodontic root treatment' in dentistry, otherwise known as a root canal
- Endo, a cycling trick also known as a stoppie, after the possible outcome of flipping "end-over-end" if performed incorrectly
- Endo, a slang abbreviation in cycling for an "end over end" accident
- Endo, a nickname for marijuana

== See also ==
- Cannabis, also known as endo in slang term
- Ecto-, a prefix meaning "outside"
- ex- or Exo-, a prefix meaning "outer"
