= Makkonen =

Makkonen is a Finnish surname. Notable people with the surname include:

- Jussi Makkonen (born 1985), Finnish ice hockey player
- Kari Makkonen (born 1955), Finnish ice hockey player
- Leo Makkonen (born 1948), Orthodox Archbishop of Finland
- Matti Makkonen (1952–2015), Finnish engineer
- Sini-Maria Makkonen (born 1986), Finnish rapper known by her stage name Sini Sabotage

== See also ==
- The Weeknd (Abel Makkonen Tesfaye; born 1990), Canadian singer and actor whose middle name is spelled as Makkonen, despite not being of Finnish descent
