= Southern Audio Services =

American Electronics Manufacturer

Southern Audio Services is an American electronics manufacturer based in Baton Rouge, Louisiana, chiefly recognized for its Bazooka Mobile Audio brand and product line. It focuses on mobile audio applications and accessories for cars and marine vehicles, and specializes in subwoofers mounted in a patented tube-styled design enclosure.

The company was founded in 1983 by Jon Jordan as a home audio loudspeaker manufacturer, but soon shifted focus to mobile audio. Engineer Dave Prophit collaborated in 1985 to help design the Bazooka's "bass tube" system.

Bazooka products have received awards from print and online publications, including Innovations magazine and Edmunds.com for "Top 10 Sound Systems in Cars Under $30,000 for 2004."
