= Ecto (software) =

Blogging client

ecto
- Developers: infinite sushi Adrian Tijsseling (Mac OS version); Alex Hung (Windows version)
- Stable release: 2.4.2
- Operating system: Mac OS X, Windows
- Type: Weblog client
- License: Proprietary
- Website: infinite-sushi.com - ecto

ecto is a commercial weblog client for Mac OS X and Microsoft Windows. It allows one to compose and store blog entries on the local desktop computer, then upload them to a weblog host. ecto interacts with popular server software such as Blogger, Movable Type, and WordPress, among others. The developer believes the additional flexibility of the desktop operating system allows the client to incorporate features lacking in web-based clients.

== Critical reception ==
AppleMatters gave ecto 9 out of 10.
