= Innovation (magazine) =

- Editor: Candace Lim
- Frequency: Tri-annually
- Circulation: 10,000
- Publisher: NUS, World Scientific
- First issue: 2000
- Based in: Singapore
- Language: English
- Website: http://www.innovationmagazine.com
- ISSN: 0219-4023 (print); 1793-673X (web)

Innovation is a subscription-based magazine, compiling recent developments in the area of research in Singapore and globally. The format and style is designed to be accessible to an "educated layperson", and also includes relevant fields such as patenting. The magazine is jointly published by the National University of Singapore and World Scientific.

To date, local Singaporean companies such as the Defence, Science and Technology Agency (DSTA) and academia have been featured in the magazine.

== Key Editorial Columns ==
Aside from the cover story, each magazine generally has the following columns:

- Features - Includes recent global developments in research. The latest publication includes an article on battery alternatives by Peter Harrop.
- In Brief - News and innovations from all disciplines
- Industry Updates - A compilation of important industry developments
- Viewpoint - Personal opinions regarding recent issues, by leaders in corporations
- Spotlight - Profiling of personalities in the international research and business community
- Events Calendar - Lists technology-related events taking place around the world.
