= Mekonnen =

Mekonnen (Amharic: መኮንን), also spelled Mekonen and Makonnen is a male name of Ethiopian origin meaning "nobleman" or "aristocrat," and the Amharic pronunciation of an ancient Ge'ez noble title (see: Ethiopian aristocratic and court titles). Notable people with the name include:

== Mekonnen ==
- Abebe Mekonnen (born 1964), Ethiopian long-distance runner
- Demeke Mekonnen (born 1963), Ethiopian politician and Deputy Prime Minister of Ethiopia
- Deresse Mekonnen (born 1987), Ethiopian middle-distance runner
- Eyob Mekonnen (1975–2013), Ethiopian reggae singer
- Hailu Mekonnen (born 1980), Ethiopian long-distance runner
- Se'are Mekonnen (died 2019), Chief of General Staff of the Ethiopian National Defence Forces
- Seifu Mekonnen (1953–2020), Ethiopian Olympic boxer
- Tadesse Mekonnen (born 1958), Ethiopian cyclist
- Ayele Mekonnen (born 1957), Ethiopian cyclist
- Tsegaye Mekonnen (born 1995), Ethiopian long-distance runner
- Wallelign Mekonnen (1945–1972), Ethiopian Marxist activist and writer
- Mekonnen Gebremedhin (born 1988), Ethiopian middle-distance runner
- Yalemtsehay Mekonnen (born 1955), Ethiopian physiologist and pharmacologist

== Makonnen ==
- Makonnen Wolde Mikael (1852–1906), Ethiopian governor and father of Haile Selassie I
- Makonnen Endelkachew (1890–1963), Ethiopian aristocrat and Prime Minister
- Tafari Makonnen Woldemikael (1892–1975), birth name of Ethiopian Emperor Haile Selassie I
- T. Ras Makonnen (1900–1983), Guyanese-born Pan-African activist
- Prince Makonnen (1923–1957), son of Haile Selassie I
- Endelkachew Makonnen (1927–1974), Ethiopian aristocrat and politician
- Seifu Makonnen (born 1953), Ethiopian Olympic boxer
- Tamarat Makonnen (born 1972), American music video director
- Makonnen Sheran (born 1989), American musician, known professionally as iLoveMakonnen
- Prince Joel Dawit Makonnen (born 1982), member of the Ethiopian Imperial Family
- Ariana Austin Makonnen, American philanthropist, business woman, and member of the Ethiopian Imperial Family
- Rebecca Makonnen, Canadian radio and television broadcaster
