= Bazooka (song) =

Single by Miami XO
- Released: December 29, 2025
- Genre: Hip-hop; meme rap; trap
- Length: 1:48
- Songwriter: Miami XO
- Producer: Slxwly

Miami XO singles chronology
"2026" (2025)	"Bazooka" (2025)	"Bazooka (Sequel)" (2026)

"Bazooka" is a single by American rapper Miami XO, released independently on December 29, 2025.

"Bazooka" quickly went viral, initially gaining traction on SoundCloud before spreading to platforms YouTube and Twitter.

== Background ==
"Bazooka" was produced by Slxwly. Lyrically, the song features a satirical tone about a grandmother getting killed by a bazooka. Stereogum describes the backstory involving a hit-and-run incident that motivates the act of revenge. In an interview with podcaster Luhsyke, Miami XO said that he "really didn’t have any, like, inspiration" for the song.

== Critical reception ==
"Bazooka" was widely recognized for its viral appeal and unique blend of humor and melody. Alexander Cole of HotNewHipHop described "Bazooka" as a song "that proves the aura of 2016 is still alive and well."

The New York Times recognized the track's impact by naming it "Song of the Week" from February 17, 2026, to February 24, 2026. Writer Jon Caramanica described "Bazooka" as one of the most durable meme songs of the year, highlighting its viral spread across SoundCloud, TikTok, and social media, and noted the contrast between the song's laid-back, melodic trap production and its darkly humorous lyrics, particularly the hook: "Kaboom, kablow, kaboom / Rest in peace my granny, she got hit by a bazooka". Caramanica also emphasized the track's cultural impact, with fans interpreting it as comedy, dance, and even therapy, and concluded that the song blends humor, musical skill, and viral creativity, making it a defining soundtrack of early 2026.

== Live performances and other uses ==
Miami XO performed "Bazooka" live for the first time at the Thaw Out Festival in Boone, North Carolina on April 25, 2026.

In early April 2026, the White House used "Bazooka" alongside war footage in a social media post. A "funeral" was held for his grandmother in the Roblox game Steal a Brainrot. In the video game Fortnite Battle Royale, an emote with the song's audio was added.

== Music video ==
A couple days into 2026, Miami XO released a no-budget music video for "Bazooka." The music video shows the rapper and his friends hanging out and holding the song's cover.

== Credits and personnel ==
Adapted from Tidal.

- Miami XO – vocals, composition, lyrics
- Slxwly – production

== Release history ==
Release dates and formats for "Bazooka"
Region	Date	Format	Version	Label	Ref.
Various	December 29, 2025	Digital download; streaming	Original	Self-released	
Various	January 1, 2026	Digital download; streaming	Re-release of original	Self-released	
Various	January 16, 2026	Digital download; streaming	Yuno Miles remix	Self-released	
