= Hugs and kisses =

Friendly term

Hugs and kisses, abbreviated in the Anglosphere as XO or XOXO, is an informal term used for expressing sincerity, faith, love, or good friendship at the end of a written letter, email or text message.

== Origins ==
The earliest attestation of the use of either x or o to indicate kisses identified by the Oxford English Dictionary appears in the English novelist Florence Montgomery's 1878 book Seaforth, which mentions "This letter [...] ends with the inevitable row of kisses,—sometimes expressed by × × × × ×, and sometimes by o o o o o o, according to the taste of the young scribbler". Here it appears that x and o are both ways to indicate a kiss. (Earlier versions of the dictionary identified an example from 1763, one Gil. White signing off a letter with "I am with many a xxxxxxx and many a Pater noster and Ave Maria, Gil. White". This has, however, since been reinterpreted as an indication of blessings rather than kisses, perhaps evoking the Christian sign of the cross.)

Nothing more is known about the origins of x and o meaning 'hugs' or 'kisses'. A 2014 article in The Washington Post that drew on interviews with scholars noted that "the Internet abounds with origin theories" yet that "there is no definitive answer to how a cross came to mean a kiss" and that "less is known about how 'o' came to signify a hug".

Speculations include that the use of x to indicate a kiss was transferred from earlier symbolic uses of the letter. Allegedly, in the Middle Ages, a Christian cross might be drawn on documents or letters to mean sincerity, faith, and honesty; the sign was certainly sometimes used in place of a signature. Unscholarly speculations sometimes extend to the idea that after a cross was written at the end of a document, the writer might kiss it as a show of their sincerity. The Greek word for Christ, ΧΡΙΣΤΟΣ, gave rise to the practice of using the Latin letter X as an abbreviation for 'Christ' (similar to the more elaborate Chi Rho symbol). Supposedly, this was then kissed in this tradition of displaying a sacred oath.

There is speculation on the Internet that the 'O' is of North American descent: when arriving in the United States, Jewish immigrants, most of whose first language was Yiddish, would use an 'O' to sign documents, thus not using the sign of the cross, and shop keepers would often use an 'O' when signing documents, in place of an 'X'.

== See also ==
- P.S.
