= Royal Opera of Versailles =

Opera house of the Palace of Versailles, France

Coordinates: 48°48′21.5″N 2°7′22″E

Royal Opera of Versailles (Opéra royal de Versailles)
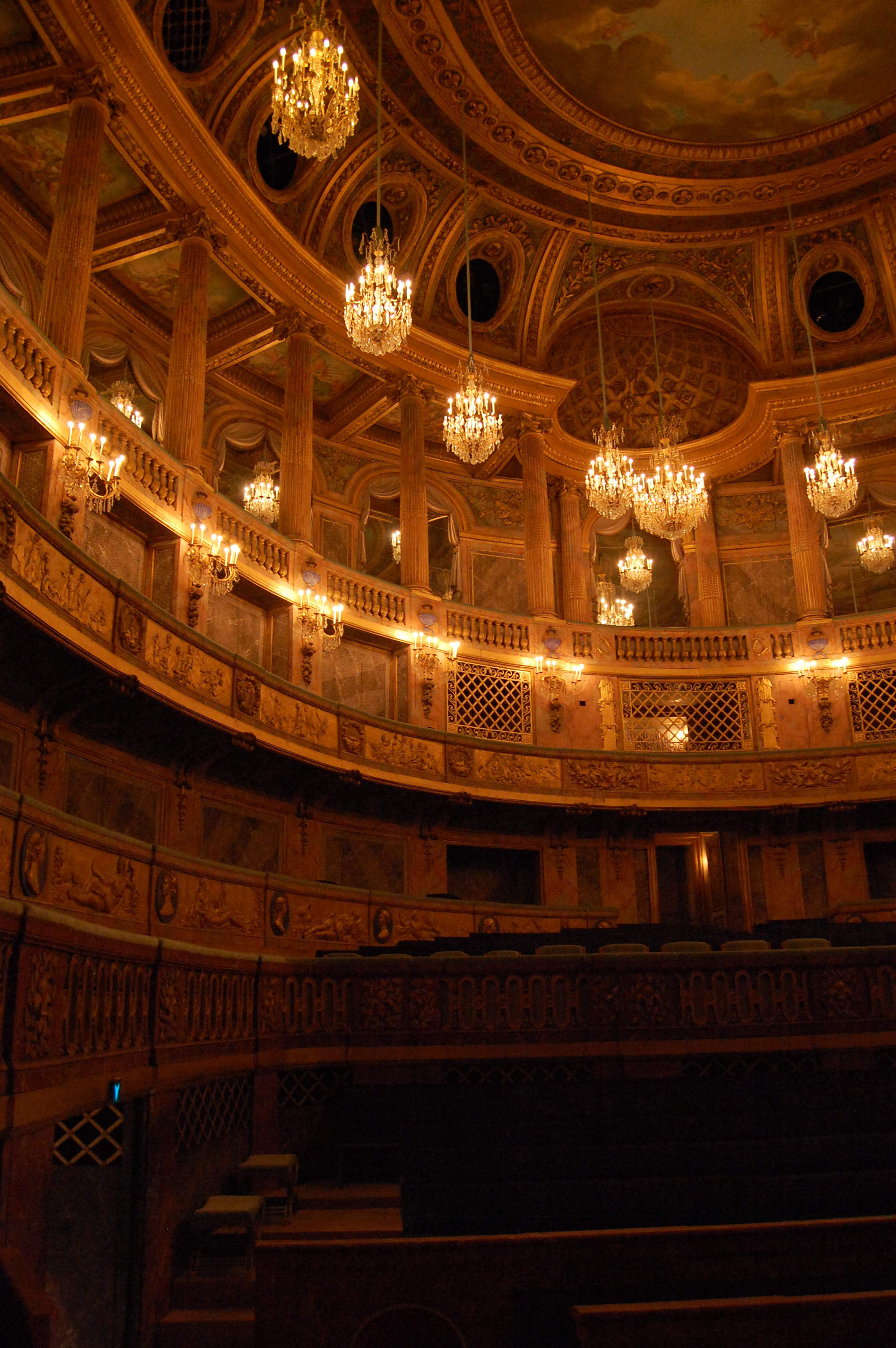
- View of the opera

General information
- Architect: Ange-Jacques Gabriel
- Decorator: Augustin Pajou
- Construction dates: 1763-1770
- Date of inauguration: 16 May 1770
- Inaugural occasion: Marriage of the dauphin (future Louis XVI) with archduchess Marie-Antoinette of Austria
- Seating, as a theater: 712
- Accommodation as salle de spectacle: 1,200
- Construction material: Wood (interior ornament); Masonry (structure)
- Central ceiling painting: Apollo preparing the crowns for illustrious Men of the Arts by Louis Jean-Jacques Durameau (1733–1796)

The Royal Opera of Versailles (French: Opéra royal de Versailles) is the main theatre and opera house of the Palace of Versailles. Designed by Ange-Jacques Gabriel, it is also known as the Théâtre Gabriel. The interior decoration by Augustin Pajou is constructed almost entirely of wood, painted to resemble marble in a technique known as faux marble. The excellent acoustics of the opera house are at least partly due to its wooden interior.

The house is located at the northern extremity of the north wing of the palace. General public access to the theater is gained through the two-story vestibule. Some parts of the Opera, such as the king's Loge and the king's Boudoir represent some of the earliest expressions of what would become known as Louis XVI style.

Jean-Baptiste Lully's Persée — written in 1682, the year Louis XIV moved into the palace — inaugurated the Opera on 16 May 1770 in celebration of the marriage of the Dauphin — the future Louis XVI — to Marie Antoinette.

The Opera Royal can serve either as a theater for opera, stage plays, or orchestral events, when it can accommodate an audience of 712, or as a ballroom, when the floor of the orchestra level of the auditorium can be raised to the level of the stage. On these occasions, the Opera can accommodate 1,200.

== The French Enlightenment ==
During the French Enlightenment, the theatre became a place where political and social ideas were considered myths and superstitions were tested. As more Enlightenment thinkers began to question the tenets of religion, many eighteenth-century citizens began to replace the pulpit with the stage, and looked to the theatre for their moral instruction as well as entertainment. The nobility had a lot to do with the rise of theatre during this time. Louis XIV, who is known as the "Sun King" for playing the allegorical character of the sun in Ballet Royal de la Nuit in 1653, moved his royal court from the capital, Paris, to Versailles, aspiring to get more control of the government. The Opera, which was built for Louis XV, however, was not built until later. His mistress, Madame de Pompadour, patronized artists, actors, and musicians while bankrupting France. Meanwhile, the aristocracy and church paid no taxes, and the bourgeoisie paid for the monarchy's tastes. Yet, it was not until after the death of Louis' mistress that the construction of the Opera began.

== The importance of early theatre in French society ==
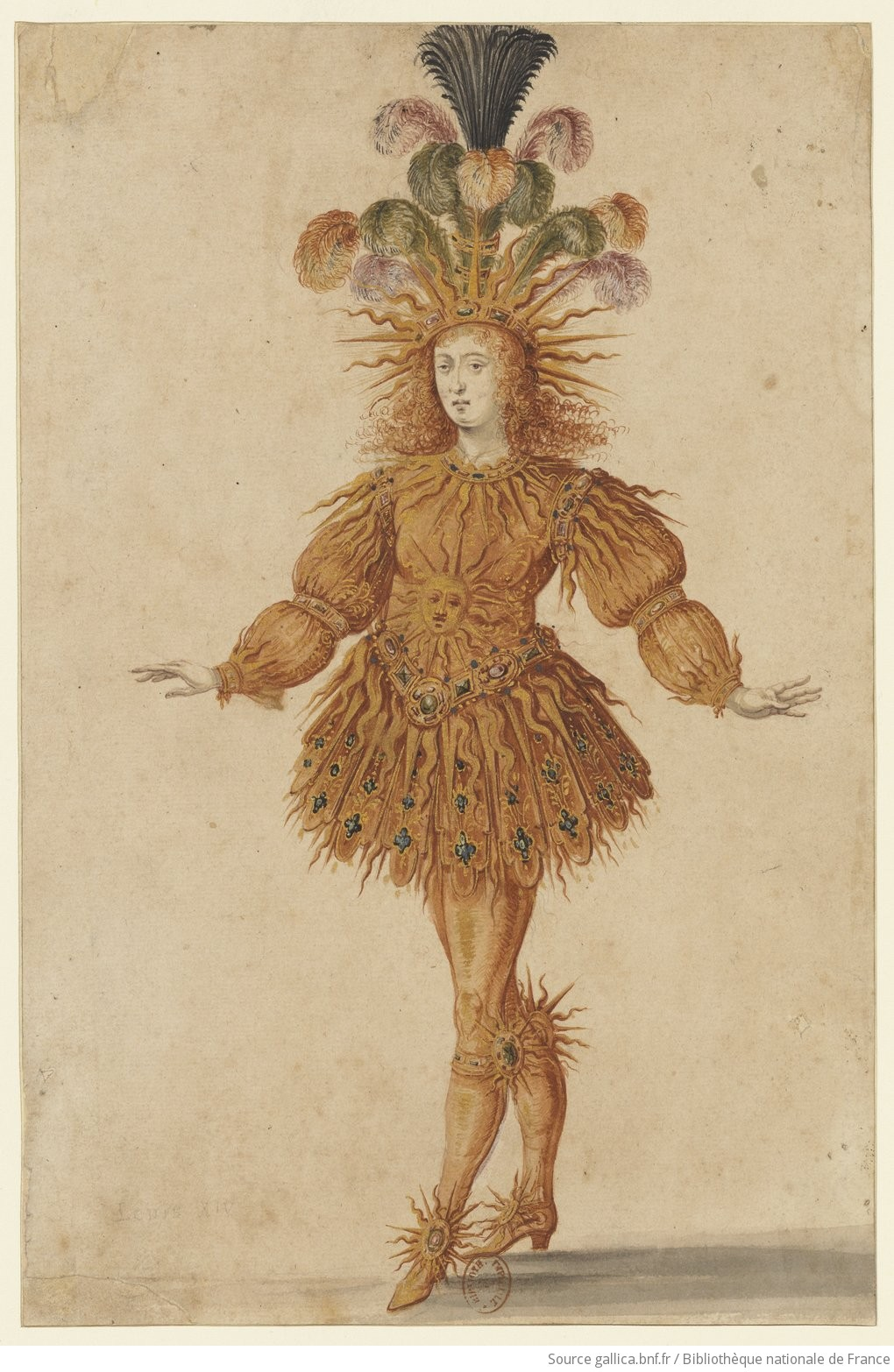
Louis XIV as Apollo in the Ballet Royal de la Nuit (1653)

Long before the Opera Royal was dreamed of, theatre was becoming an important part of French society. Beginning with the reign of Louis XIII, the frequency and regularity of theatrical performances had increased: the show was considered as much an entertainment as it was an expression of power. The idea of it being an expression of power can be traced to one of Louis XIII's ministers, Cardinal Richelieu. Richelieu wanted to create an image of the king (and France) that displayed well roundedness in all things, a society who dabbled not only in politics or court, but music and art and theatre. He envisioned a force to lead the way, culturally. Attending a theatrical performance was quickly becoming a sign of stature, and though few permanent theatre spaces were created at this time, theatre found itself performed anyway. It is pertinent to note that until the final installation of the Versailles court, performances of operas and ballets, comedies and tragedies, were performed mainly in the gardens.

Soon, however, spaces that were frequently used for performances would become specific performance spaces. In time the royal residences equipped themselves little by little with fixed theatres, although they often continued to use temporary structures and installations one could disassemble in various places, such as galleries, staircases, lounges, and gardens. These staged productions were important for many reasons. Little divertissements for the court, they also were at times used by royalty for their own reasons. Louis XIV's performance during the Ballet Royal de la Nuit, for example, was a statement of his power, his coming of age, and the fact that he was ready to take the throne with no regents. Indeed, his performance as Apollo is what earned him the name Sun King. Stage productions such as operas and ballets were important during the reigns of the Bourbon monarchs in France. Louis XIV in particular employed these and similar art forms extensively not only to entertain the noblemen in his court but also to promote his own self-image and the glory of his country. Although he desired an Opera for his beloved Versailles, during the second half of Louis' reign, most operas, ballets and other staged divertissements for court and the public appeared indoors, in theatres or in other sites arranged as required for individual productions.

== Temporary theatres 1664 to 1674 ==
During the early years of his reign of Louis XIV, theatres were often temporary structures, built for a particular event and destroyed after their use. The first such theater was constructed for the fête of The Pleasures of the Enchanted Island, which was held in 1664. In the area west of what is now the Bassin d'Apollon, a temporary theater was constructed in which Molière's La Princesse d'Élide débuted on 8 May. During this fête an additional theatre was erected inside the chateau for the presentation of three other plays by Molière: Les Fâcheux, Le Mariage Forcé, and Tartuffe, which premiered in an incomplete, albeit contentious, form. None of these theatres survived this fête.

The Grand Divertissement royal of 1668, which celebrated the end of the War of Devolution, witnessed the construction of a luxurious temporary theater built in the gardens on the site of the future Bassin de Bacchus. Constructed of papier-mâché, which was either gilded or painted to resemble marble and lapis lazuli, the theater seated 1,200 spectators who attended the debut of Molière's George Dandin ou le Mari confondu on 18 July 1668. As with The Pleasures of the Enchanted Island, this theater was destroyed shortly after the end of the fête.

The third fête or, more accurately, a series of six fêtes - Les Divertissments de Versailles - were held in July and August 1674 to celebrate the second conquest of Franche-Comté. The fête featured a number of theatrical productions that were staged throughout the grounds in temporary theaters. On 4 July, Jean-Baptiste Lully's Alceste was performed for the court in the Cour de Marbre; on 11 July, Philippe Quinault's L'Églogue de Versailles was staged near the Trianon de Porcelaine; eight days later, the Grotte de Thétys served as the setting for Molière's The Imaginary Invalid; and Jean Racine's Iphigénie debuted on 18 August in a theater constructed in the Orangerie.

== Creation of permanent theatres ==
=== La salle de la Comédie, 1681 to 1769 ===
In spite of the need for a permanent theater at Versailles, it would not be until 1681 that a permanent structure would be built. In that year, the Comptes des Bâtiments du Roi record payments for a theater that was constructed on the ground floor of the château between the corps de logis and the Aile de Midi. The interior of the theater – known as the salle de la Comédie – contained a semicircle of row seating with loges set into the bays of the lateral walls. On the south wall of the theater, abutting the wall of the Escalier des Princes, was the royal tribune, which contained a central room octagonal loge and two smaller loges on either side. The salle de la Comédie would function as a de facto permanent theater at Versailles until 1769, when it was destroyed in order to provide direct access to the gardens from the Cour Royale.

=== Small theatre, 1688 to 1703 ===
In 1688, Louis XIV ordered a small theater to be constructed in the north wing of the Grand Trianon. This structure was destroyed in 1703 to accommodate a new apartment for the King.

Because the salle de la Comédie was designed for stage plays, Versailles lacked a theatre in which more elaborate productions could be staged. For larger productions, the Grand Manège (the covered riding arena) in the Grand Écurie was converted for more elaborate entertainments, but the space had limitations. In 1685, Louis XIV approved plans for the construction of a larger permanent theater that could the more elaborate productions, such as pièces à machines.

The pièces à machines were theatrical presentations using ballet, opera, and special staging effects that required a theatre that could accommodate the complicated machinery used in the production of these plays. The Salle des Machines at the Tuileries Palace in Paris, designed by Carlo Vigarani, was the closest to Versailles. However, with Louis XIV's dislike for Paris – due in large part to his flight from the Tuileries in 1651 – and his increasing wish to keep his court at Versailles, the King approved the construction of a larger theater in 1685. With a plan more grandiose than the theatre of the Tuileries, the construction of this new theatre was much lauded by contemporary descriptions of Versailles.

Construction was planned for the northern end of the Aile des Nobles, and was well underway when the War of the League of Augsburg, which began in 1688, permanently halted construction. It would not be until the reign of Louis XV that construction on this site would resume.

== Return to temporary theatres and conversions, 1729 to 1770 ==
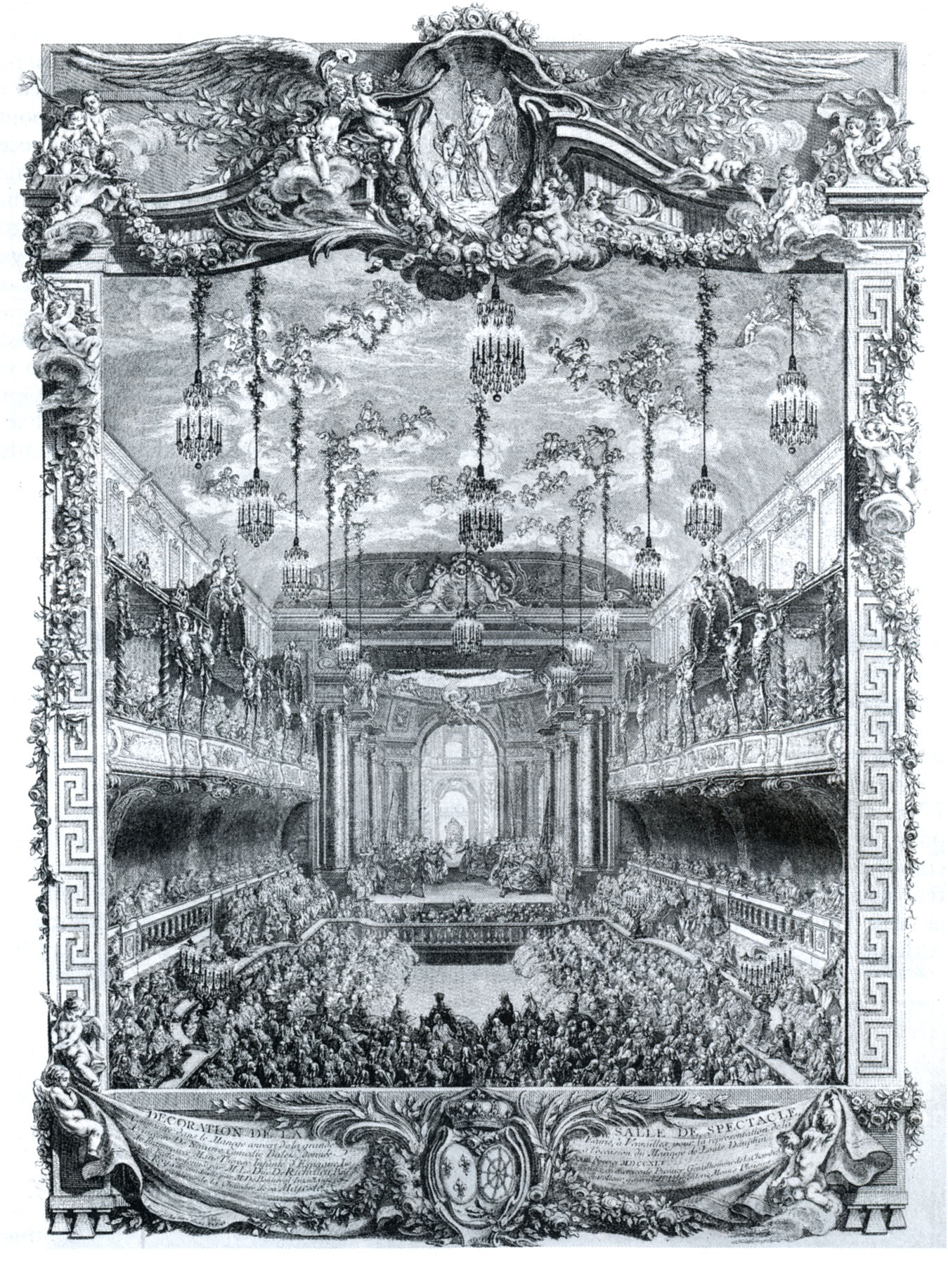
Premiere of Rameau's La princesse de Navarre on 23 February 1745 in the Grande Écurie, engraving by Charles-Nicolas Cochin.

With the return of the court to Versailles in 1722, spaces used by Louis XIV were once again pressed into service for the needs of the court. In 1729, as part of the festivities in celebration of the birth of the Dauphin Louis, a temporary theatre was constructed in the Cour de Marbre. The salle de la Comédie and the Manège of the Grand Écurie continued to be used as they had during the reign of Louis XIV.

However, owing to Louis XV proclivity for more a more intimate theater, a number of temporary theaters known as the théâtres des cabinets were created. These theaters were most often constructed in one of the rooms of the petit appartement du roi, with the petite galerie being the most frequently used starting from 1746. In 1748, the Escalier des ambassadeurs was converted into a theatre, in which Madame de Pompadour staged and acted in a number of plays. Two years later, the theatre was dismantled when the Escalier des ambassadeurs was destroyed for the construction of the apartment of Madame Adélaïde.

Acutely aware of the need for a larger and more permanent theater, as early as the 1740s Louis XV, seriously considered reviving Louis XIV's plans for a permanent salle de spectacle to be constructed at the northern end of the Aile de Nobles. However, owing to the Seven Years' War, construction would not be able to commence for nearly 20 years. When fire destroyed the Grand Écurie and the theatre of the Manège in 1751, and since the salle de la Comédie had become an unfeasible venue due to its size for theatrical productions, Louis XV finally authorized Ange-Jacques Gabriel to design the Opera in 1763.

== Construction of the Opera, 1765 to 1770 ==
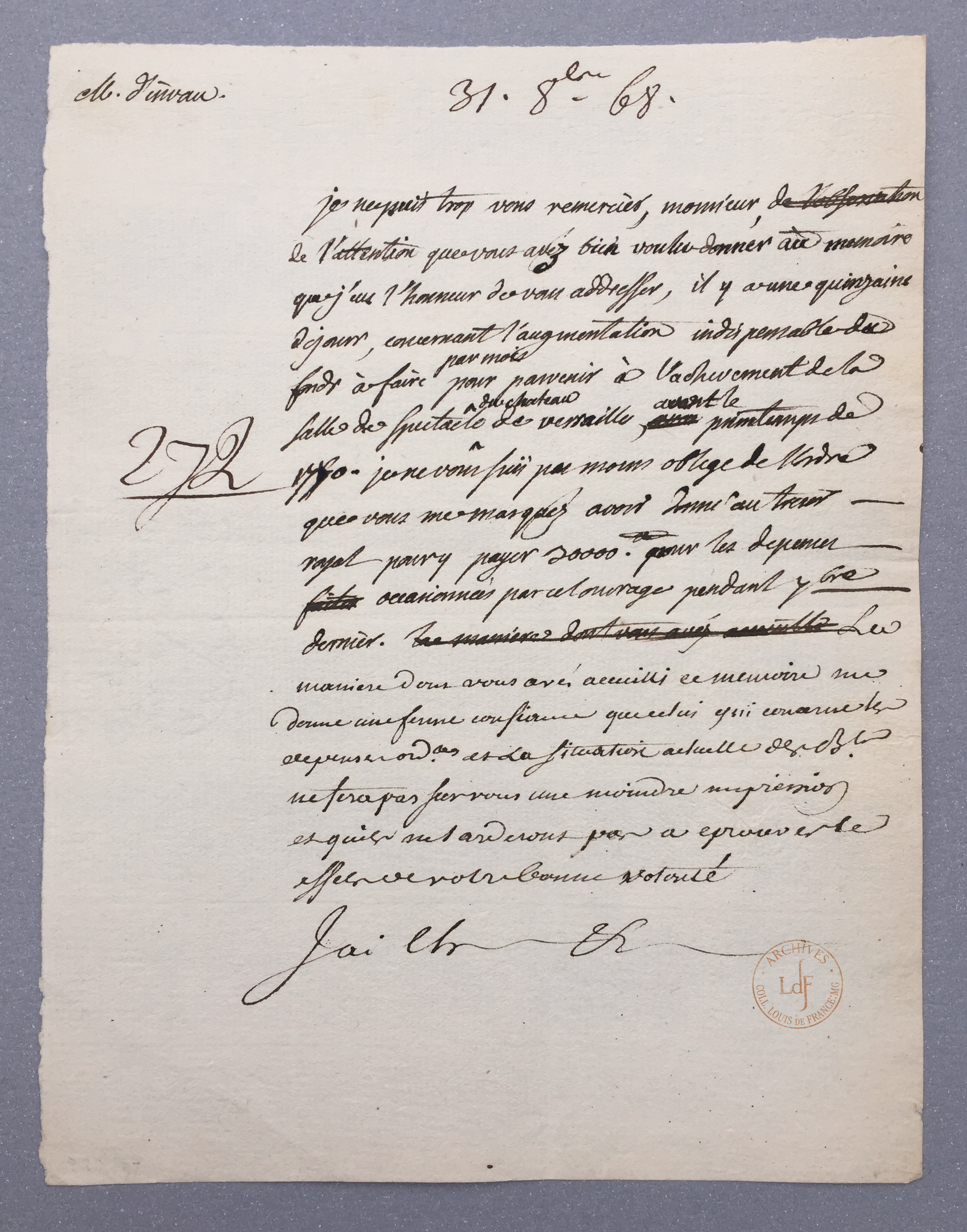
The Marquis de Marigny asking Étienne Maynon d'Invault, Controller-General of Finances, for a budget increase to complete the works on the Royal Opera of Versailles until spring 1770 («parvenir à l'achèvement de la salle de spectacle du Château de Versailles, avant le printemps de 1770»). Draft letter, October 31, 1768.

Construction work on the Opera began in earnest in 1765 and was completed in 1770. Ange-Jacques Gabriel reverted to an old design by Jules Hardouin-Mansart and Gaspare Vigarani: the Salle des Ballets, at the far north end of the château, which had been abandoned at the outbreak of the War of the Spanish Succession. The terminal pavilion of the north wing, intended for this, had been carried up to its full height only on the garden side; on the street side it had advanced no further than the foundations. At the time, it represented the finest example in theatre design, having 712 seats, and it was the largest theatre in Europe. Today, it remains one of the few 18th century theaters to have survived to the present day.

Gabriel's design for the Opera was exceptional for its time since it featured an oval plan. As an economy measure, the floor of the orchestra level can be raised to the level the stage, thus doubling the floor space. The transition from the auditorium to the stage is managed by the introduction of a giant order of engaged Corinthian columns, with a cornice ranging with the whole Ionic entablature. The proscenium is formed by two pairs of columns, coupled in depth, with their entablature. On either side two more pairs, more widely spaced, enclosed with three tiers of boxes. Breaking with traditional Italian-style theatres which stacked tiered boxes like chicken coops, two balconies ring the house, topped by an ample colonnade that seems to extend into infinity thanks to a play of mirrors. It was planned that the Opera should serve not only as a theatre, but as ballroom or banqueting hall as well. The theatre burned ten thousand candles in a single setting, therefore making it very expensive to rent the space out.

It opened May 16, 1770, with Lully's Persée. (On May 23, 2014, Persée returned to the theatre for the first time in 244 years, with a production by the Canadian opera company Opera Atelier.)

On 1 October 1789, the gardes du corps du roi held a banquet to welcome the Flanders Regiment, which had just arrived to strengthen protection for the royal family against the revolutionary rumblings that were being heard in Paris. At this banquet, Louis XVI, Marie Antoinette, and the Dauphin received the pledge of loyalty from these guards. Revolutionary journalist Jean-Paul Marat described the banquet as a counter-revolutionary orgy, with the soldiers ripping off the blue-white-red cockades they had been wearing and replacing them with white ones, the color that symbolized the Bourbon monarchy. In truth, there is no evidence of this act, and actual eyewitnesses and attendees, such as the Queen's lady of the bedchamber Madame Campan, record no such destruction of cockades. This was the last event held in the Opera during the Ancien Régime.

Built entirely of wood, which is painted in faux marble to represent stone, the Opera has excellent acoustics and represents one of the finest examples of neo-classical decoration. The theme of the decoration is related to Apollo and the Olympian deities. The decoration of the Opera was directed by Augustin Pajou, who executed the bas-reliefs panels that decorate the front of the loges. The ceiling features a canvas by Louis Jean-Jacques Durameau in which Apollo and the Muses are depicted.

In spite of the excellent acoustics and the opulent setting, the Opera was not often used during the reign of Louis XVI, largely on grounds of cost. However, for those occasions when the Opera was used, they became events of the day. Some of the more memorable uses of the Opera during the reign of Louis XVI included:

5 May 1777: Revival of Jean-Philippe Rameau's Castor et Pollux for the visit of Joseph II, Holy Roman Emperor, Marie Antoinette's brother.
23 May 1782: Revival of Aline, reine de Golconde by Michel-Jean Sedaine;
29 May 1782: Revival of Christoph Willibald Gluck's opera, Iphigénie en Aulide and the revival of Maximilien Gardel's ballet Ninette à la Cour;
8 June 1782: Dress ball held in honor of the visit of the comte and comtesse du Nord, the Tsesarevich Paul and Tsesarevna Marie Feodorovna of Russia who were traveling incognito.
14 June 1784: Revival of Gluck's Armide for the visit of Gustav III of Sweden.

== The Opera after the Revolution ==
Originally used only for royal ceremonies and extraordinary performances, this pinnacle of the Gabriel family's work began to be used less and less because of the immense cost to stage productions there. During the period of its usage, however, it was an example of royal lavishness and love for theatrical performances, and the fact that attending opera was once again the fashionable thing to do for the upper class, thanks in part to Queen Marie Antoinette's patronage, should not be underestimated.

When the royal family left Versailles in October 1789, the château and the Opera were closed. While the château did see some activity under Napoleon (redecoration of the parts of the queen's apartment for the Empress Marie Louise) and Louis XVIII, the Opera did not reopen again until 1837, when Louis Philippe I redecorated the theater and presented Molière's Le Misanthrope. During the state visit of Queen Victoria and Prince Albert, the Opera Royal was converted into a banquet room for a gala dinner on 25 August 1855. This was to be one of the most elaborate events staged at Versailles during the Second Empire.

In 1872, during the Paris Commune, the Opera was converted by Edmond de Joly for use by the Assemblée nationale, who used the Opera until 1876; between 1876 and 1879, the Senate convened here.

== The Opera Royal since 1950 ==
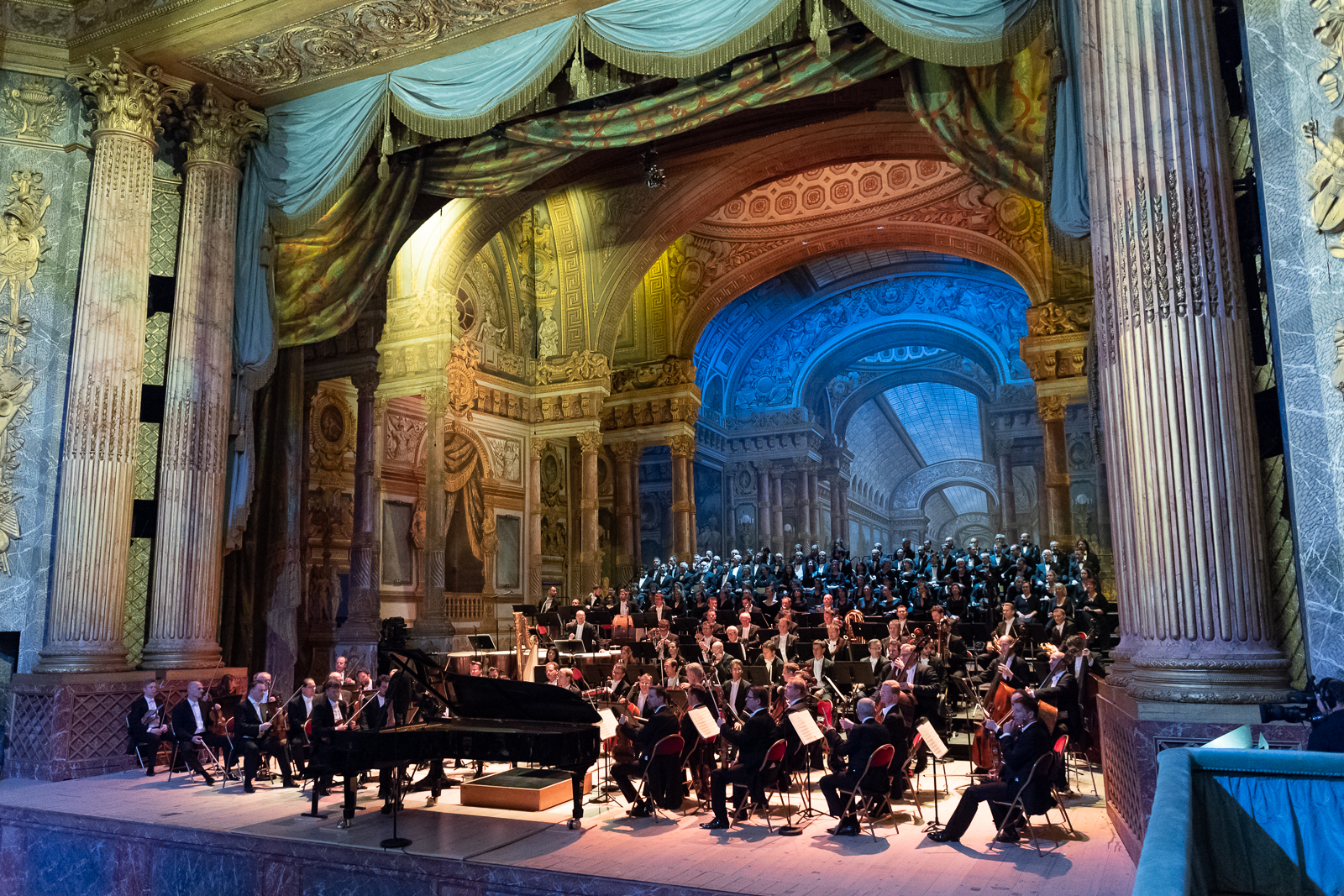
View of the stage

1952–1957 witnessed major restoration of the Opera – generally considered one of the finest restoration projects undertaken at Versailles – when it was restored under the direction of André Japy to its 1770 state (Verlet, p. 384). The Opera officially reopened on 9 April 1957 in the presence of Queen Elizabeth II of the United Kingdom, with a presentation of Act II of Rameau's Les Indes Galantes. Since its restoration, the Opera has been used for state functions as well as a variety of operatic and musical events (Langlois, 1958).

The Opera was most recently closed in June of 2007 for an extensive two year renovation to bring the backstage and production areas up to safety standards. During this latest renovation, led by chief architect of Monument historique Frédéric Didiera, a new firewall was installed, the downstage timberframe stairs were restored to their original purpose, stage and lighting equipment were modernized, the technical grid was redone, dressing rooms were moved and brought up to modern standards, and adjacent spaces formerly given over to the Senate, including the Actor's Building, were reclaimed to once again accommodate the needs of performers, workshops, and offices. The Opera reopened its doors in September of 2009, and has since carried out an expanded and ambitious regular series of operatic, balletic, and concert performances, especially celebrating the works of the Baroque and Classical periods most closely associated with the Opera and the Palace of Versailles.

Today, with its superb acoustics and magnificent décor, the Opera represents one of the finest 18th century opera houses in Europe. The importance of the Opera Royal is directly linked to the history of the many theatres at Versailles and the history of theatrical stagings in 17th and 18th century France.

== Gallery of images ==
Temporary theaters during the reign of Louis XIV
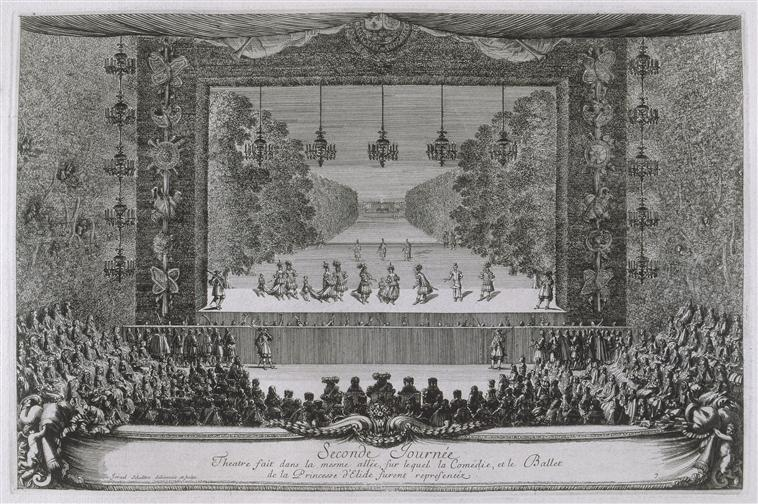
Les Plaisirs de l'Ile Enchantée, temporary theater built for the production of Molière's la Princess d'Élide (8 May 1664). Silvestre Israël Silvestre, 1621–1691.

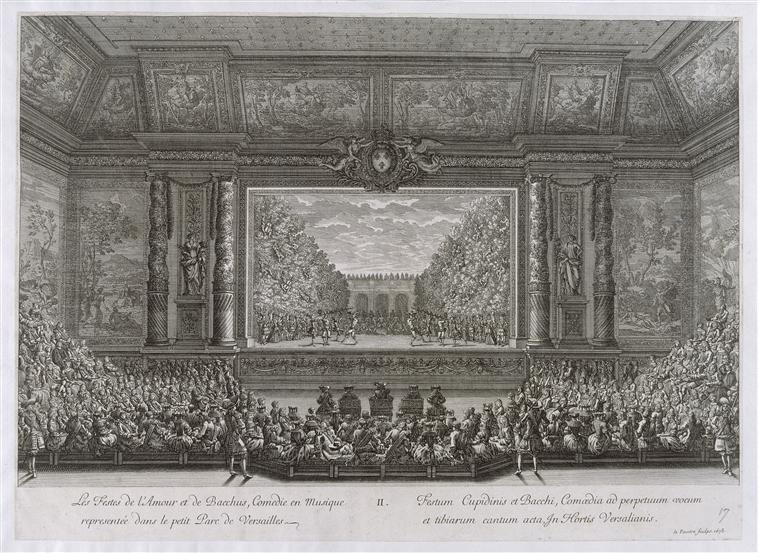
Grand Divertissement royal, temporary theater built for the production of Molière's George Dandin ou le Mari confondu (15 July 1668) Jean Le Pautre, 1618–1682.

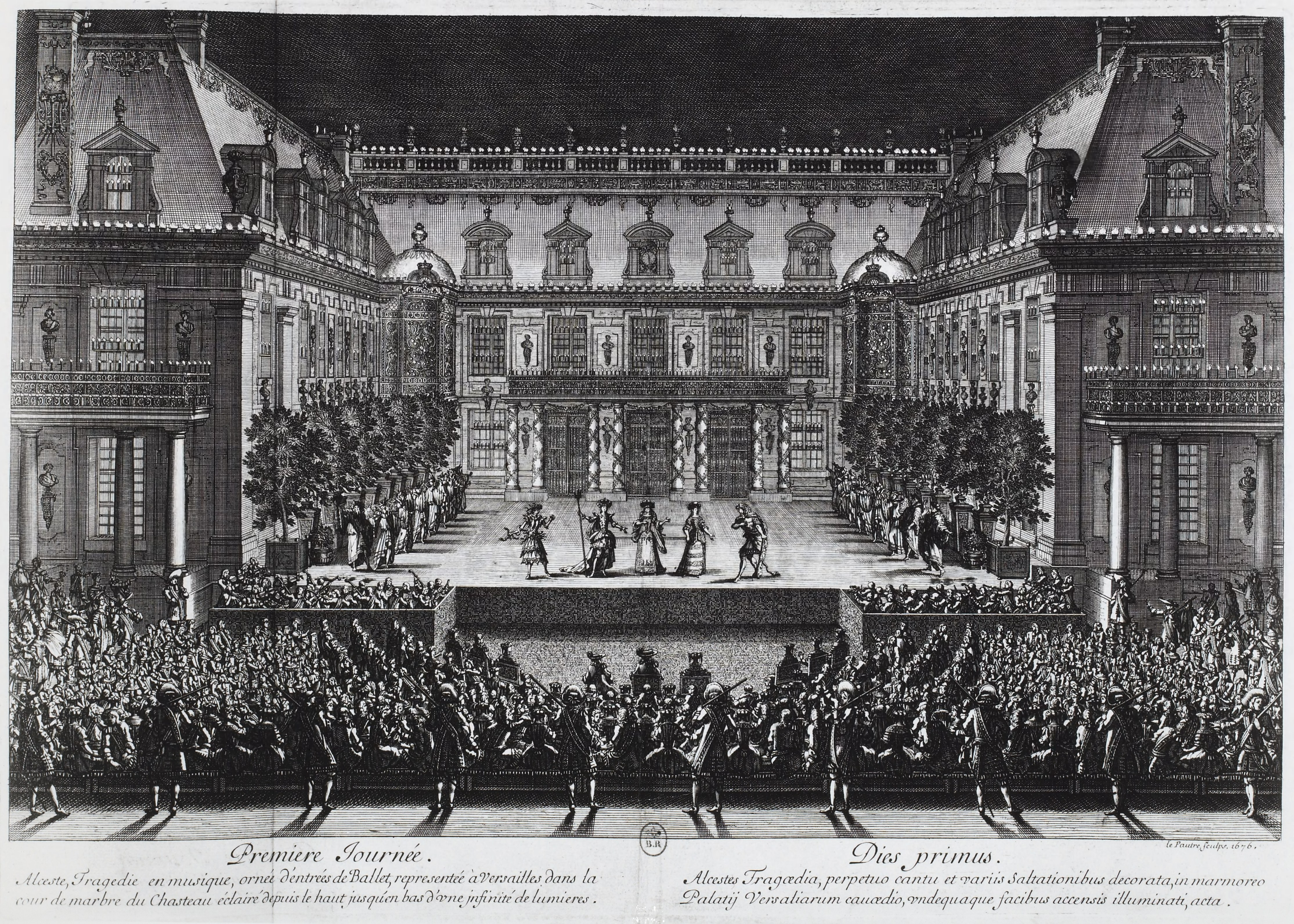
Les Divertissments de Versailles, the Cour de Marbre serving as a theater for the production of Philippe Quinault's and Jean-Baptiste Lully's Alceste (4 July 1674).

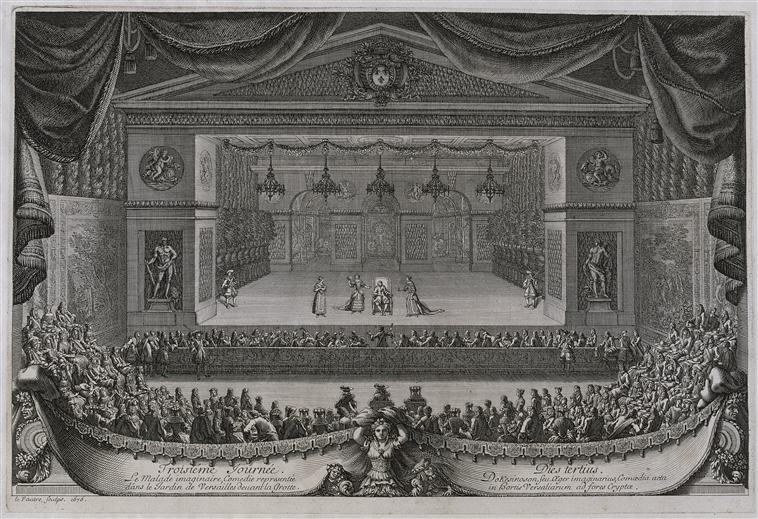
Les Divertissments de Versailles, temporary theater built before the Grotte de Thétys for the revival of Molière's The Imaginary Invalid. (18 July 1674). Jean Le Pautre, 1618–1682.

Temporary theaters during the reign of Louis XV
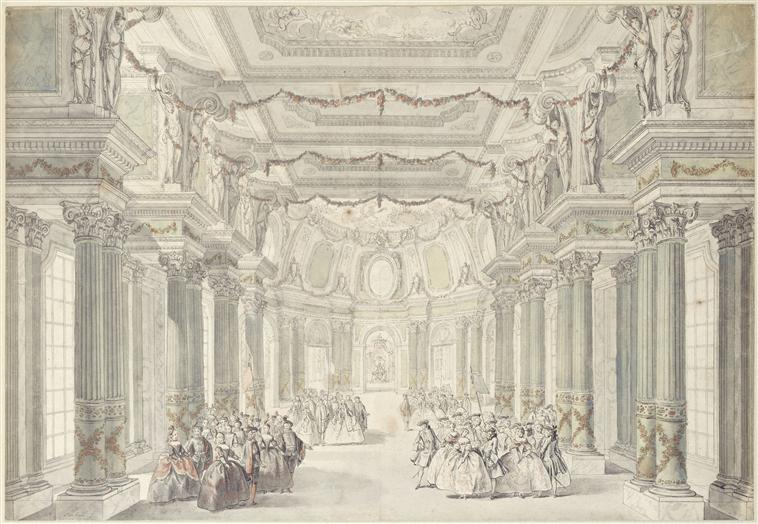
"Presentation of the comédie-ballet La Princesse de Navarre given in the manège of the Grande Écurie of Versailles on the occasion of the marriage of the Dauphin to the Infanta Maria Teresa Rafaela of Spain (23 February 1745)." Charles Nicolas Cochin (le Jeune), 1715–1790.

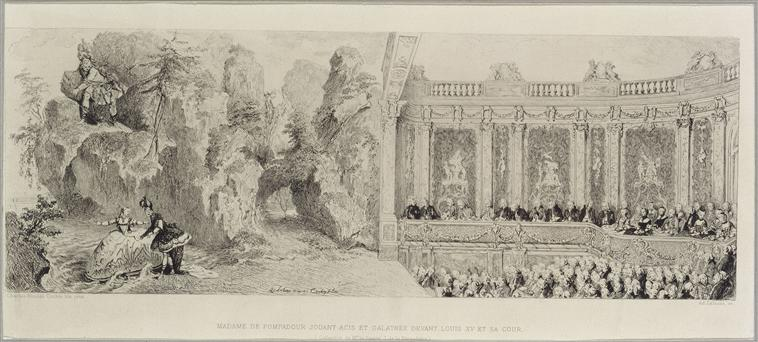
"Acis et Galatée, presented on the stage of the theater constructed in the escalier des Ambassadeurs at Versailles (23 January – 10 February 1749." Adolphe Lalauze, 1838–1906 (ca. 1890 after a design by Cochin).

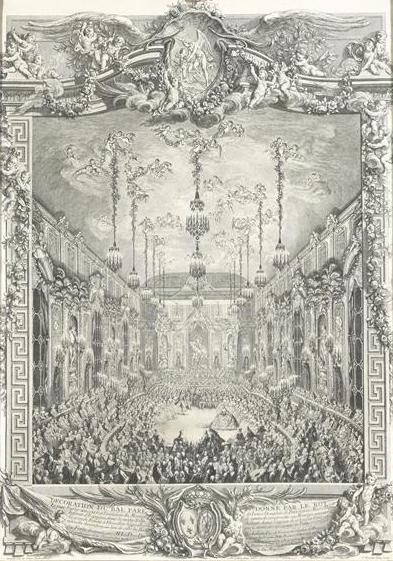
"Fancy dress ball given by the king in the manège of the Grande Écurie of Versailles on the occasion of the marriage of the Dauphin to the Infanta Maria-Thérèse-Raphaëlle of Spain (24 February 1745)." Charles Nicolas Cochin (le Jeune), 1715–1790.

The Opéra royal during the 18th and 19th centuries
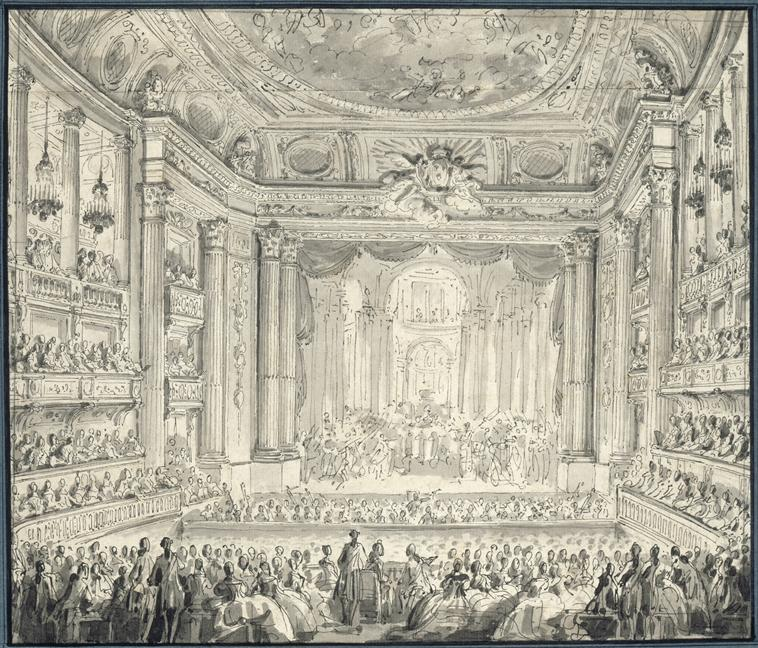
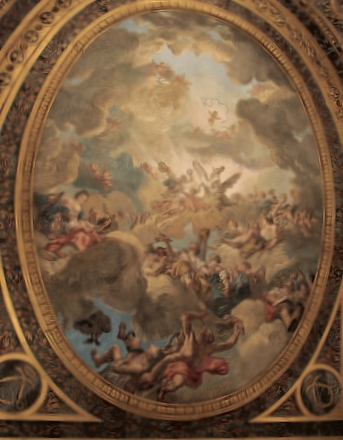
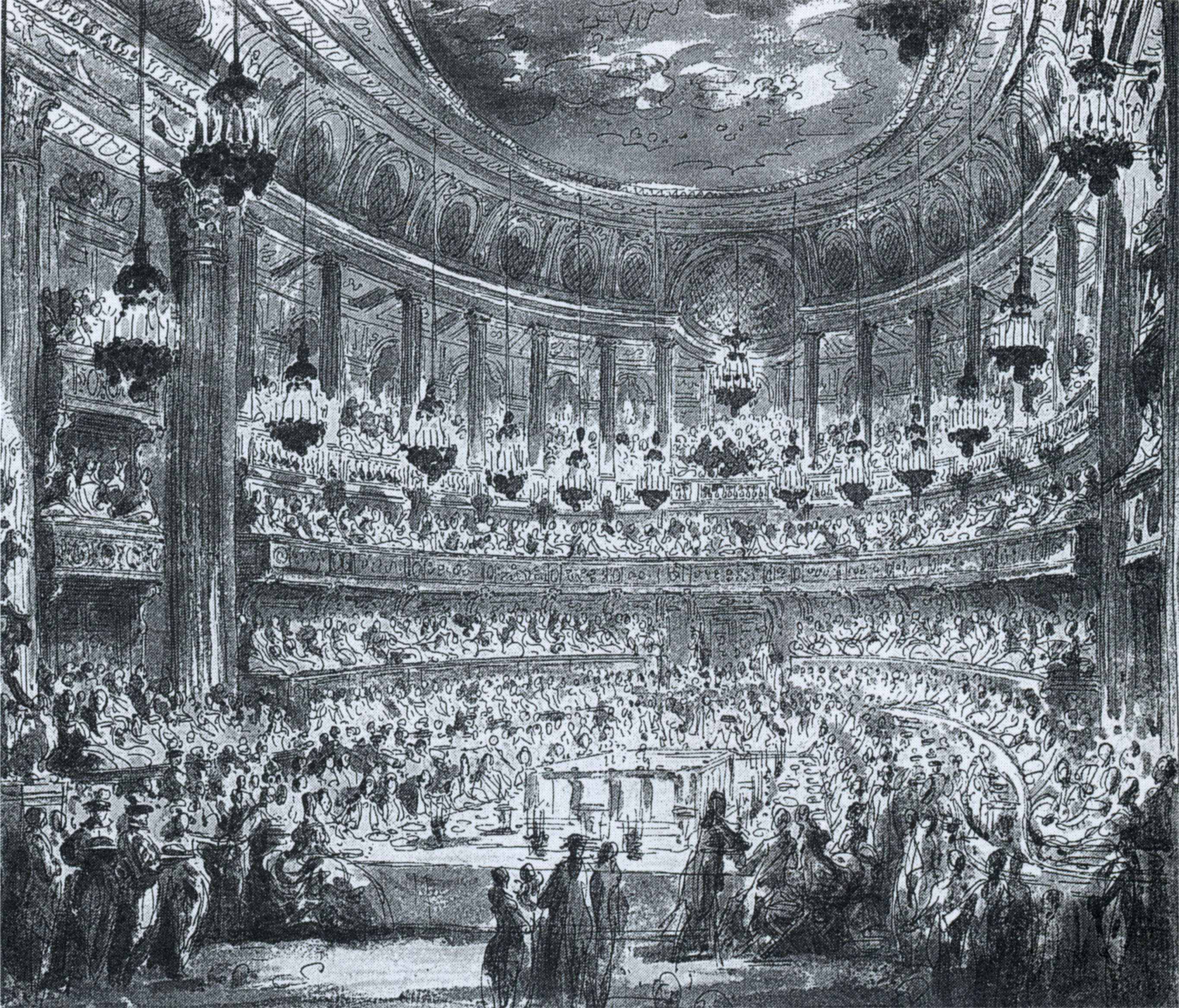
"Inauguration of the Opéra, 16 May 1770."

Jean-Michel Moreau (1741–1814).

Ceiling of the Opéra royal de Versailles. "Apollo preparing the crowns for illustrious Men of the Arts" ca. 1770.

Louis Jean-Jacques Durameau (1733–1796).

Auditorium of the Opéra de Versailles during the celebrations of the wedding of the Dauphin and Marie Antoinette in 1770.

Jean-Michel Moreau (1741–1814).

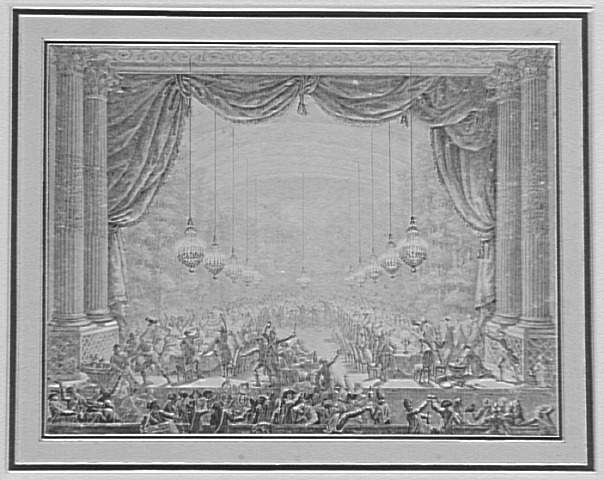
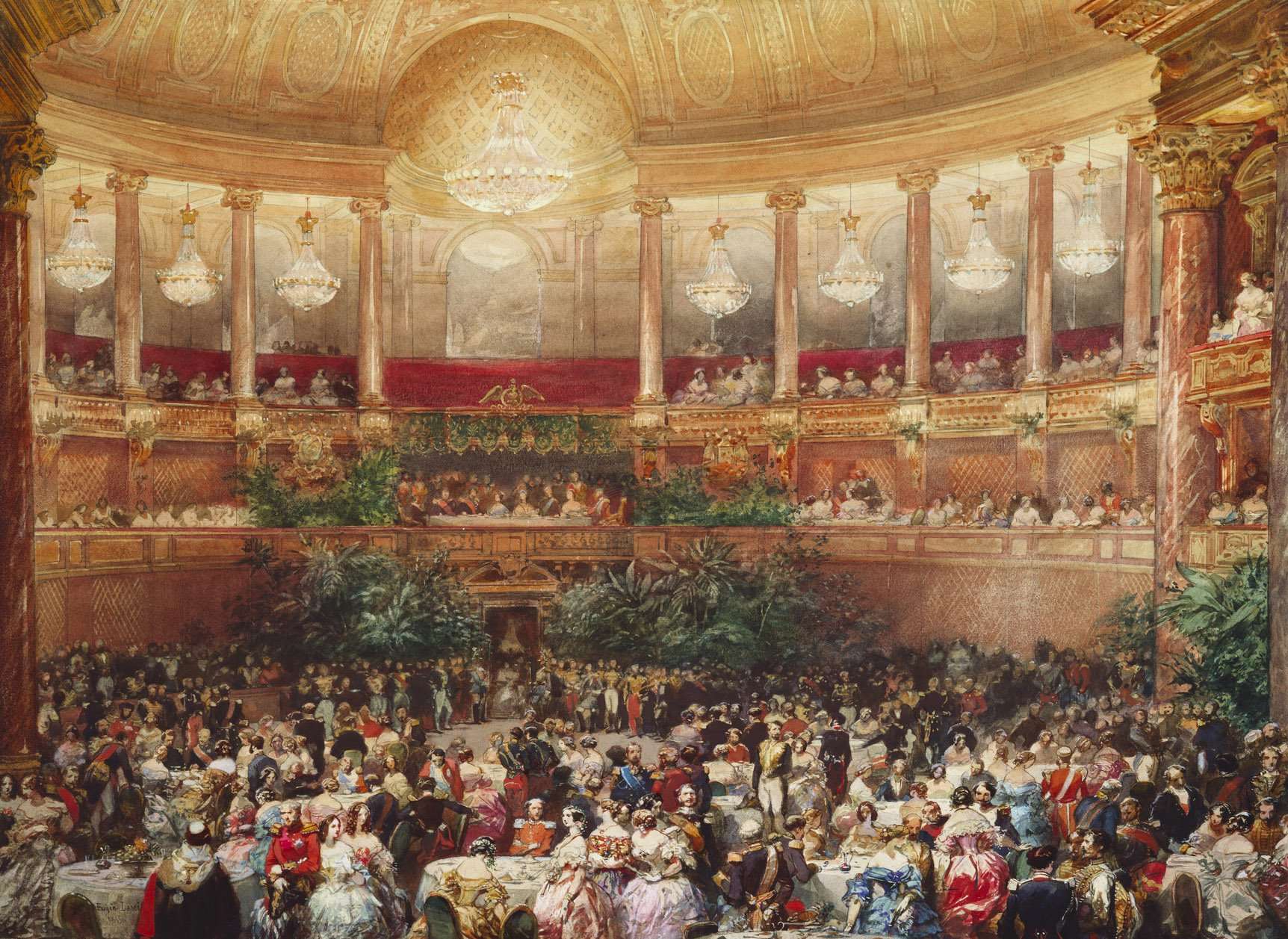
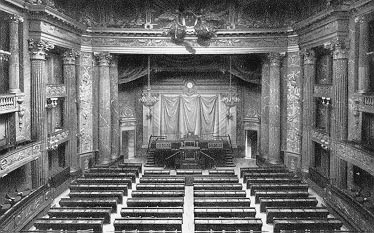
"Banquet of the gardes du corps given in the Opéra de Versailles, 1 October 1789."

Jean-Louis Prieur (1759–1795).

Banquet offered by Napoleon III to Queen Victoria and Prince Albert of Saxe-Coburg and Gotha in the Opera of Versailles, 25 August 1855.

Eugène Lami (1800–1890)

The Opera of Versailles converted for the use of the Senate of the Third Republic, ca. 1876.
