= Interlude =

Interlude may refer to:

- a short play or, in general, any representation between parts of a larger stage production
- Entr'acte, a piece of music performed between acts of a theatrical production
- a section in a movement of a musical piece, see: Bridge or Break
- a piece of music composed of one or more movements, to be inserted between sections of another composition: see also intermezzo, and for the Baroque era, sinfonia

== Music ==
=== Albums ===
- Interlude (Billy Taylor album), 1961
- Interlude (Toshiko Akiyoshi album), 1987
- Interlude (Kool Moe Dee album), 1994
- Interlude (EP), a 1999 EP by Iron Savior
- Interlude (Saint Etienne album), 2001
- Interlude (David Lyttle album), 2012
- Interlude (Delain album), 2013
- Interlude (Jamie Cullum album), 2014

=== Songs ===
Many albums contain songs titled "Interlude", or acted as an interlude. Notable songs are listed below.

- "Interlude" (aka "A Night in Tunisia"), a 1942 composition by Dizzy Gillespie
- "Interlude" (1957 song), a Skinner/Webster song recorded by the McGuire Sisters in 1957
- "Interlude" (Timi Yuro song), 1968, later covered by Morrissey and Siouxsie in 1994
- "A Thousand Miles" (originally "Interlude"), by Vanessa Carlton, 2002
- "Repeat After Me (Interlude)", by the Weeknd, 2020
- "Interlude" (J. Cole song), 2021

== Films ==
- Interlude (1946 film), Swedish film directed by Hasse Ekman and starring Viveca Lindfors and Erik Berglund
- Interlude (1957 film) an American film directed by Douglas Sirk and starring June Allyson and Rossano Brazzi
- Interlude (1968 film), a British film directed by Kevin Billington and starring Oskar Werner and Barbara Ferris

== Other uses ==
- Morality play, a modern critical term describing medieval and early Tudor theatrical entertainments that were known as "Interludes"
- Interlude (visual novel), a 2003 anime and visual novel by Longshot
- Interlude (painting), a 1963 painting by John Koch
- Interlude, an interactive media production company, now known as Eko
- Interlude (The Righteous Gemstones), an episode of the American television series The Righteous Gemstones

== See also ==
- Lude (disambiguation)
- Inter (disambiguation)
