= John Koch =

American painter (1909–1978)

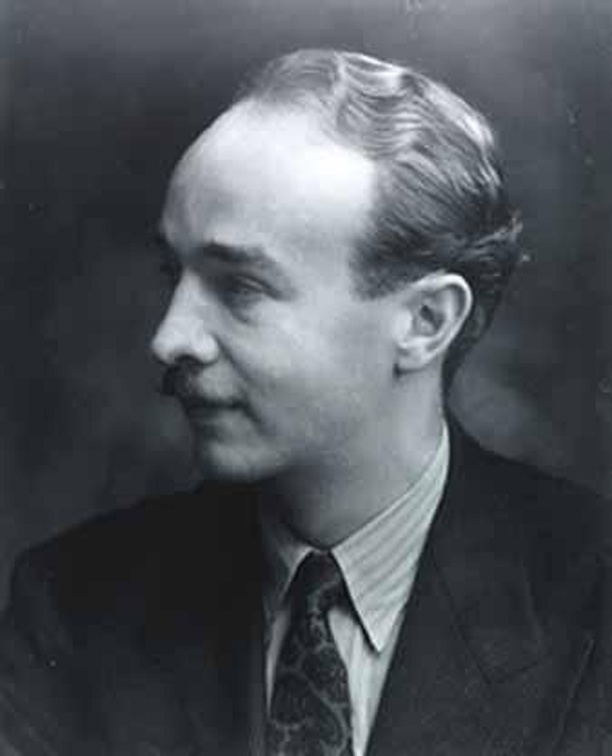
- Born: August 18, 1909; Toledo, Ohio, US
- Died: April 19, 1978 (aged 68); New York City, US
- Education: self-taught
- Known for: portraits, genre scenes
- Notable work: Cocktail Party (1956); Studio – End of Day (1961); Siesta (1962); The Sculptor (1964)
- Movement: Realism
- Spouse: Dora Zaslavsky
- Awards: National Academy of Design (multiple awards); National Arts Club gold medal

John Koch (August 18, 1909 — April 19, 1978), (pronounced "KŌK") was an American painter and teacher, and an important figure in 20th century Realism. He is best known for his light-filled paintings of urban interiors, often featuring classical allusions, many set in his own Manhattan apartment.

His works are in the collections of prominent American museums, including the Metropolitan Museum of Art, the Smithsonian American Art Museum, the Whitney Museum of American Art, the Brooklyn Museum, the Museum of Fine Arts, Boston, and many others.

== Life and career ==
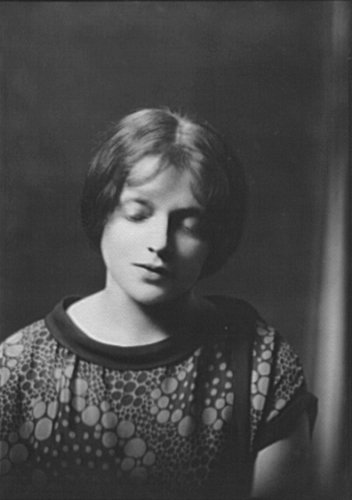
Dora Zaslavsky in 1925, photographed by Arnold Genthe

Koch was born in Toledo, Ohio, to Marian Joan and Edward John Koch, and grew up mostly in Ann Arbor, Michigan. During his high school years he spent two summers at an artists' colony in Provincetown, Massachusetts. He moved to New York City in 1928, where he met and became friends with Dora Zaslavsky, a talented piano teacher, four years his senior. He moved to Paris, where he spent five years studying on his own, copying paintings at the Louvre and other museums, and supporting himself by painting portraits.

He returned to New York City in 1934, where Zaslavsky was teaching at the Manhattan School of Music and waiting for her divorce to be finalized. They were married on December 23, 1935. The Koch marriage was childless, which may have been a cause of regret—his 1955 painting Father and Son depicts him turning from his easel to see himself as a boy lying on the floor and sketching.

Koch was drafted into the U.S. Army in 1943, but wound up doing alternative service in New York veterans hospitals. He taught at the Art Students League of New York, 1944–1946. After World War II he became a featured artist at Portraits Incorporated, which managed commissions and charged up to $10,000 for a group portrait by him. (Note: Koch wrote to LIFE Magazine in 1956 after it misstated his fees: "LIFE's statements concerning the prices for my work are quite inaccurate. Instead of receiving $3,000 for a group of two, my lowest fee is $4,500. For larger groups, I command a much larger fee. JOHN KOCH, New York, N.Y.")

In 1953, John and Dora Koch bought a 14-room apartment on the tenth floor of The El Dorado, a building at 300 Central Park West. They soon bought the adjacent apartment to house Dora's piano studio. Following the death of Koch's mother, his father came to live with them. Koch painted individual portraits of his father, and featured him in several of the group portraits.

Koch suffered a stroke in 1975, that paralyzed his right hand and forced him to use a wheelchair. He recovered some use of his hand, but died in 1978, following a second stroke.

I am quite visibly a Realist, occupied essentially with human beings, the environments they create, and their relationships. — John Koch

== Art ==
Koch's early work may be considered Impressionist. A review of his 1943 one-man show at Kraushaar Galleries praised his "throwing off his Renoirish tendency and asserting himself on his own". Much of his mature work is composed of portraits and social scenes, including cocktail parties and scenes with the artist at work with his models. The models are often but not always nude.

Koch has developed a soft and luminous style of underpainting in egg tempera and glazing with misty oils to create a cool and ingratiating effect vaguely reminiscent of the seventeenth-century Dutch master Vermeer. He paints mostly portraits of wealthy New Yorkers, at $3,000 and up, set in the elegant interiors that best become them.

His Portraits Inc. commissions included Family Group (1951, Smithsonian American Art Museum), John and Barbara Wood and their two sons; Roosevelt Ladies at Oyster Bay (1953, private collection), Mrs. Quentin Roosevelt II, her three young daughters, and another girl; (Note: Frances Webb (1917–1995), married Quentin Roosevelt II in 1944. They had three daughters: Alexandra (b. 1945), Anna (b. 1946), and Susan (b. 1948). Quentin died in a 1949 plane crash at age 29.) and a c.1954 double portrait of composer Richard Rodgers and his wife, designer Dorothy Rodgers. Publisher Malcolm Forbes commissioned two group portraits: The Forbes Family (1956, private collection) and The Forbes Family at Dinner (1966, private collection). The Forbes Magazine Collection also purchased numerous paintings by Koch. Both Koch's 1955 portrait of Great Britain's Princess Margaret and his 1966 portrait of actress Julie Andrews are in the collection of the National Portrait Gallery.

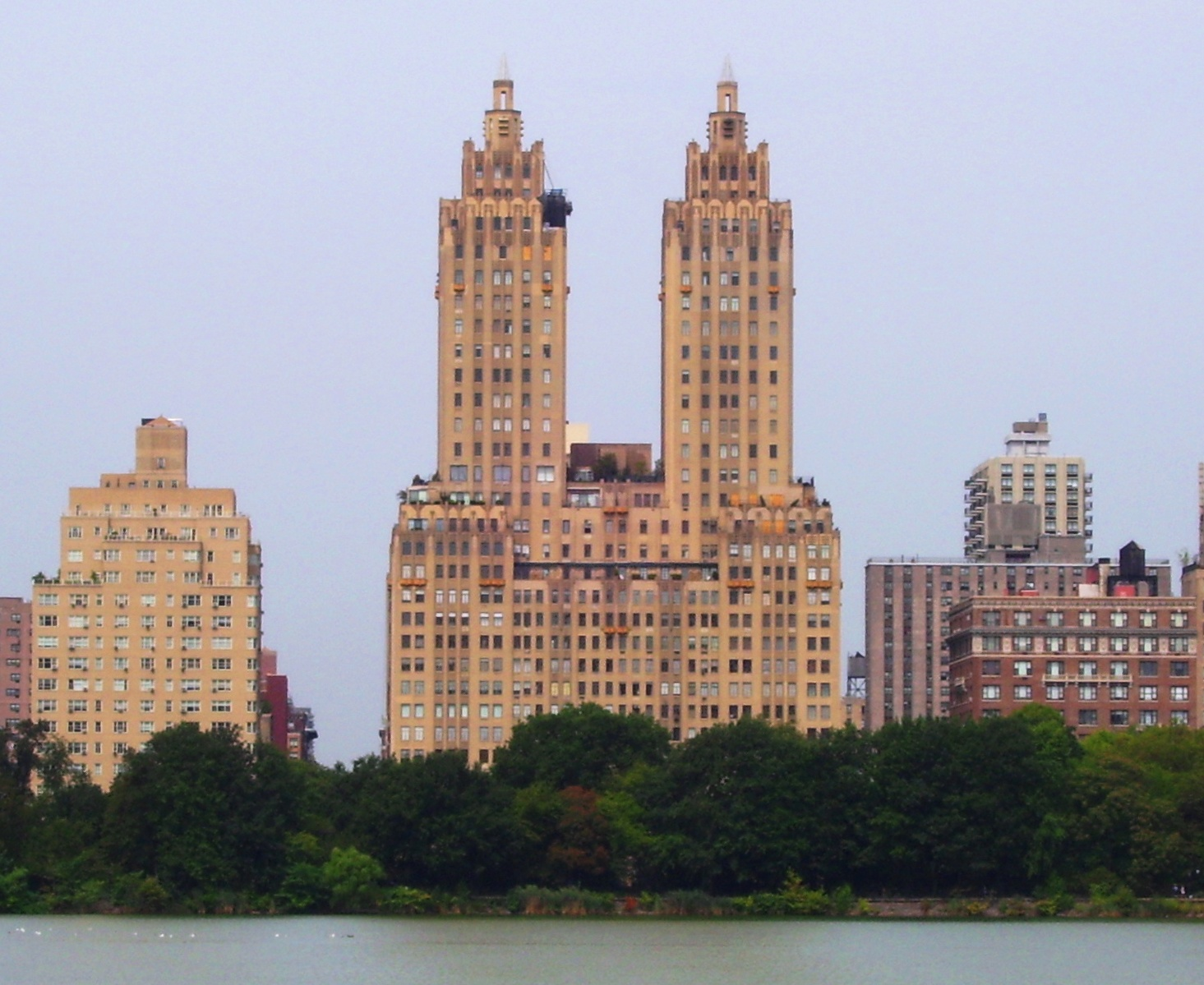
The El Dorado from Central Park Reservoir. The Koches' apartment was at the northeast corner of the 10th floor (right). Its living room faced the park.

Cocktail Party (1956), is perhaps Koch's most famous work. "The party he portrayed occurred only in his imagination, although its attendees were all acquaintances of the Kochs in the mid-1950s. Each was painted from life at separate sittings, and placed by Koch into his immaculate new living room at the El Dorado, with the painter and his wife as the consummate hosts. John stands at the bar, self-consciously reflected in a mirror as he pours one of his famous martinis; Dora bends forward to attend to the seated music critic Noel Strauss." The painting also is an example of his games-playing with spaces and objects: "Koch often shifted the location and appearance of his precious objects in his paintings. A couch might be burgundy in one work and navy blue in another. A door might lead to a bathroom or a bedroom, depending upon the needs of the composition. In this instance, the painting over the mantle is a Tiepolo entirely of Koch's creation. Tiepolo never painted it, and the Kochs never owned it. Nonetheless, Koch thought it was a fine placement for a Tiepolo such as this one, and so here it is."

In his personal works, Koch created unusual and complex compositions, sometimes through the use of mirrors, as in Interior of Studio (1956). The painting at first appears to be a casual genre scene, with a handsome young bodybuilder, Ernest Ulmer, one of Dora's piano students, relaxing on a sofa, center, while Dora is on the phone, left. Reflected in the large mirror behind Ulmer is the opposite end of the room, where piano student Don Edmans and Koch's father are engaged in conversation before the glare of a window. Also semi-obscured by the glare is Koch standing at his easel, gazing intently at Ulmer (and at the viewer via Koch's reflection). Koch seems to have given the painting to Ulmer, "which hung in his own living room for many year." Ulmer donated Interior of Studio to the Metropolitan Museum of Art in 2007.

Ulmer posed for Koch's "most self-revealing painting", The Sculptor (1964, oil on canvas, 80" x 59 7/8", Brooklyn Museum). Its original title was Prometheus, the god who stole fire from Mount Olympus. A full-length standing male nude seen from behind, Ulmer towers over the seated Koch and holds a cigarette lighter at hip level, while the artist leans in to get a light. The lighter illuminates Koch's face and its flame is vividly reflected in his glasses, "a sexually loaded reference to Prometheus's gift of fire to mankind".

As punishment for the theft of fire, Zeus chained Prometheus to a rock and sent an eagle each day to tear out his liver. Koch was an occasional sculptor, and modeled Prometheus and Hercules, a work depicting Hercules wrestling with the eagle to rescue the chained Prometheus. A large version of this sculpture appears in the background of The Sculptor, and Ulmer may have posed for the sculpture as well as the painting. (Note: A smaller version of Prometheus and Hercules appears in The Plasterers (1967), End of the Day (1970), and Rest Period (1974); and an even smaller version appears as the base of a lamp in Model Undressing (1962), The Lesson (1970), and Sunday Noon (1973).)

Koch's most frequent model was his wife Dora, (Note: Other frequent models included Rosetta Howard (1926–2003): Studio – End of Day (1961), Interlude (1963), Two Artists and a Model (1965); Felicity Dell'Aquila-Geyra; and Ernest Ulmer.) who appeared in dozens of his paintings, including tender double portraits painted for their wedding anniversaries.

=== Exhibitions, awards and honors ===
While living in Paris, Koch exhibited at the 1929 Salon de Printemps of the Société des Artists Français, and received an honorable mention.

His first one-man show was in 1939 at Kraushaar Galleries in New York City, from which East River (c.1934) was purchased for the Brooklyn Museum. Kraushaar represented him for the next thirty-four years, and presented more than a dozen one-man shows.

He exhibited at the Pennsylvania Academy of the Fine Arts from 1939 to 1945, and in 1952 and 1962. Two of his works were chosen for the Whitney Museum of Art's 1941 annual exhibition, Paintings by Artists Under Forty. The Metropolitan Museum of Art hosted American Painting Today, A National Competitive Exhibition in 1950, at which The Monument was shown. (Note: The catalogue listed the price for The Monument as $3,500.) He first exhibited at the National Academy of Design in 1948, and was awarded its Altman Prize in 1959 and 1964, its Saltus Medal in 1962, its Morse Medal in 1968, and its Engle Prize in 1972.

Koch was elected an Associate member of the National Academy of Design in 1953, and an Academician in 1954. He was awarded the National Arts Club's 1963 gold medal, and was elected to the American Academy of Arts and Letters in 1970.

The U.S. Senate authorized Leon Kroll, Julian E. Levi, and Koch to select American art to be exhibited in the Hall of Education at the 1964 New York World's Fair.

The Museum of the City of New York hosted a 1963 exhibition: John Koch in New York, 1950–1963. The New York Cultural Center hosted a 1973 retrospective exhibition of his work. Kraushaar Galleries hosted a 1980 memorial exhibition of his work.

The New York Historical Society organized a 2001–2002 posthumous exhibition, John Koch: Painting a New York Life. In a Time Magazine review, critic Robert Hughes compared Koch's highly cultured "painted world" to that of Vermeer, and the artist's consummate skill in painting surfaces to John Singleton Copley. "Memory and desire: Koch's great understated themes."

In 2022, the Hammer Museum at University of California, Los Angeles, organized the exhibition Joan Didion: What She Means, curated by The New Yorker theater critic Hilton Als. The exhibition paid homage to writer Joan Didion, and works by John Koch and 50 other modern and contemporary international artists were included to give a flavor of the New York City art scene of the 1950s, 1960s and 1970s.

== Sexuality ==
There are notable sexual undercurrents in Koch's paintings. TIME Magazine featured his painting Siesta on the cover of its January 24, 1964 special issue: Sex in the U.S. And there has always been speculation about Koch's sexuality. Editor and critic Leo Lerman (1914–1994), an "out" gay man, a long-time friend of the Koches and a subject in several of the paintings, wrote of Koch in his posthumously published journals: "I was astonished to find he was a practicing homosexual. I think Dora knew." But there is no other literature or stories from Koch's many friends and students that corroborate this, and he was happily married, for almost 50 years, to Dora Zaslavsky.

== Legacy ==
Among Koch's private students were Charles Pfahl, Nelson Shanks, and Teodorico Quirós.

Koch was one of six American Realist painters depicted in Raphael Soyer's 1962 group portrait, Homage to Thomas Eakins. (Note: The 6 painters were Leonard Baskin, Edward Hopper, John Koch, Jack Levine, Reginald Marsh, Moses Soyer, and art historian/Eakins biographer Lloyd Goodrich.) Soyer painted a larger version, 1964–1965, with eleven American Realist painters. (Note: The 11 painters were Leonard Baskin, Edwin Walter Dickinson, John Dobbs, Edward Hopper, John Koch, Jack Levine, Reginald Marsh, Henry Varnum Poor, Mary Soyer, Moses Soyer, Raphael Soyer himself, and art historian/Eakins biographer Lloyd Goodrich.) That painting and Soyer's 1965 study of Koch are at the Hirshhorn Museum and Sculpture Garden.

Author Dorothy Parker's last published article was a 1964 appreciation of Koch's paintings and the nostalgic New York that they evoked: "I know Mr. Koch only through his paintings, and through the almost lyrical tributes to his works. I do not know what school of painting he belongs to; he is not, I believe, avant-garde, and he is, I gather, though I have to strain to take it in, a realist—but not of the ashcan school of the Glackens, Luks, Sloan group. He takes his realism out on the rich. His lovely ladies step out of Edith Wharton, and his graceful gentlemen come from Henry James."

Pulitzer-Prize-winning reporter Joseph B. Treaster wrote Koch's New York Times obituary: "For much of his career, Mr. Koch was regarded by the art world's avant‐garde and the powerful family of museum directors as a rather accomplished, but, perhaps, superficial society painter whose aim was nothing more serious than to please. But with the revival of Realism in the last decade, critics and many younger artists began to take a more serious view of his work."

Koch's papers are at the Smithsonian Institution's Archives of American Art, for which he recorded a 1968 oral history.

The John Koch Award in Art is presented annually by the American Academy of Arts and Letters "to a young painter of figurative work", and is accompanied by a $10,000 prize.

Studio – End of Day (1961) set the auction record for a painting by Koch. On December 1, 2005, it realized $604,000 at Christie's New York, and is now in the collection of the Crystal Bridges Museum of American Art.

== Selected works ==
=== Portraits ===
- Portrait of Harvey La Terre (1942), Georgia Museum of Art, Athens
- Portrait of My Wife (1942), New Britain Museum of American Art, Connecticut
- Self-Portrait (c.1950-1953), National Academy of Design, New York City
- Portrait of the Artist's Father (1951). Auctioned at Christie's NYC, 26 February 2013, Realized $62,500
- Family Group (1951), Smithsonian American Art Museum, Washington, D.C.
- Roosevelt Ladies at Oyster Bay (1953), Roosevelt family
- Interior: Leo Lerman (1953), National Academy of Design, New York City
- Portrait of Felicia and Reginald Marsh (1953), Whitney Museum of American Art, New York City
- The Antiquarian (1953), Metropolitan Museum of Art, New York City
- Portrait of Princess Margaret (1955), National Portrait Gallery, Washington, D.C.
- Portrait of Dora in Interior (c.1957), Whitney Museum of American Art, New York City
- The Forbes Family (1956), private collection
- The Forbes Family at Dinner (1966), private collection
- Portrait of Julie Andrews (1966), National Portrait Gallery, Washington, D.C.
- The Painter and His Wife (1967), Gibbes Museum of Art, South Carolina
- Painting Alice Neel (1969), Hirshhorn Museum and Sculpture Garden, Washington, D.C.
- Portrait of Janet D. Schenck (1970), Manhattan School of Music, New York City
- Portrait of Henry Luce III (1973), private collection
- Portrait of Mrs. Joel Lang with "The Cocktail Party" (n.d., after 1956), Farnsworth Art Museum, Maine

=== Genre scenes ===
- Rehearsal (c.1938-1940), Columbus Museum, Georgia
- Supper Table (1939), Newark Museum, New Jersey
- The Supper Table (c.1940), University of Michigan Museum of Art, Ann Arbor
- Flower Shop (c.1940), Nelson-Atkins Museum of Art, Missouri. Exhibited at PAFA, 1940
- The Toast (c.1940), Lehigh University Art Galleries, Pennsylvania
- At the Museum (1941), Museum of Fine Arts, Boston, Massachusetts
- Vermont Marble Quarry (c.1941), Museum of Fine Arts, Springfield, Massachusetts. Exhibited at Whitney Museum, 1941
- Bathers (c.1941), Fort Wayne Museum of Art, Indiana
- The Florist (1943), New Britain Museum of American Art, Connecticut
- Garden at Wilmington (c.1946), Delaware Art Museum, Wilmington
- The Window (1947), Brooklyn Museum, New York City
- From My Window (c.1947), New Britain Museum of American Art, Connecticut
- The Monument (1950), unlocated. Exhibited at the Metropolitan Museum of Art's American Painting Today, A National Competitive Exhibition, 1950.
- Hanging Clothes (1950), Toledo Museum of Art, Ohio
- The Bridge (c.1950), Fine Arts Museums of San Francisco, California
- The Bed (c.1950), Detroit Institute of Arts, Michigan
- My Studio (c.1952), Smithsonian American Art Museum, Washington, D.C.
- Studio in Night Light (1952–1953), Des Moines Art Center, Iowa
- Interior of Studio (1956), Metropolitan Museum of Art, New York City
- Dressing (1956), Metropolitan Museum of Art, New York City
- Friends (c.1956), Metropolitan Museum of Art, New York City
- Music (1956–1957), Butler Institute of American Art, Ohio
- Three Musicians (1958). Auctioned at Sotheby's NYC, 20 May 2015, Realized $274,000
- Polishing the Chandelier (1958), Parrish Art Museum, New York
- Studio – End of Day (1961), Crystal Bridges Museum of American Art, Arkansas. Auctioned at Christie's NYC, 1 December 2005, Realized $604,000
- Model Undressing (1962), Metropolitan Museum of Art, New York City
- Siesta (1962). Auctioned at Bonhams NYC, 29 July 2020, Realized $596,075
- Conversation (c.1962), Smithsonian American Art Museum, Washington, D.C.
- Interlude (1963), Memorial Art Gallery, University of Rochester, New York
- 10 A.M. (c.1963), Virginia Museum of Fine Arts, Richmond
- The Sculptor (1964), Brooklyn Museum, New York City, gift of the artist
- The Painter (1964). Sold at Christie's NYC, 19 May 2010, Realized $122,500
- The Toast (1964), Addison Gallery of American Art, Massachusetts
- The Plasterers (1967). Sold at Brunk Auctions, 9 May 2005, Realized $210,000
- The Rehearsal (1968), Princeton University Art Museum, New Jersey
- End of Day (1970), Rockford Art Museum, Illinois
- Morning (1971), Hirshhorn Museum and Sculpture Garden, Washington, D.C.
- Two Models and the Artist (1972), Westmoreland Museum of American Art, Pennsylvania
- Painter and Models (1972), Columbia Museum of Art, South Carolina
- The Telephone (1972), Lauren Rogers Museum of Art, Mississippi
- Writing Letters (1973), Canton Museum of Art, Ohio
- Sunday Morning (1974), Virginia Museum of Fine Arts, Richmond
- Studio – End of Day II (1974), Minneapolis Institute of Art, Minnesota
- The Window Washers (1975), Wichita Museum of Art, Kansas
- Telephone Call (n.d.), Whitney Museum of American Art, New York City
- Female Nude (n.d.), Whitney Museum of American Art, New York City

=== Landscapes and still lifes ===
- East River (c.1934), Brooklyn Museum, New York City
- Vermont Landscape (c.1940), Bennington Museum, Vermont
- Still Life with Angels (1953). Auctioned at Christie's NYC, 20 May 2008, Realized $29,800
- Still Life, Dusk, Setauket (1963), Marion Koogler McNay Art Museum, Texas
- Dining Room Still Life (1972), Nelson-Atkins Museum of Art, Missouri
