= Intermezzo =

Opera genre

In music, an intermezzo (/ˌɪntərˈmɛtsoʊ/, Italian pronunciation: [interˈmɛddzo], plural form: intermezzi), in the most general sense, is a composition which fits between other musical or dramatic entities, such as acts of a play or movements of a larger musical work. In music history, the term has had several different usages, which fit into two general categories: the opera intermezzo and the instrumental intermezzo.

== Renaissance intermezzo ==
The Renaissance intermezzo was also called the intermedio. It was a masque-like dramatic piece with music, which was performed between the acts of a play at Italian court festivities on special occasions, especially weddings. By the late 16th century, the intermezzo had become the most spectacular form of dramatic performance, and an important precursor to opera. The most famous examples were created for Medici weddings in 1539, 1565, and 1589. In Baroque Spain the equivalent entremés or paso was a one-act comic scene, often ending in music and dance, between jornadas (acts) of a play.

== Opera intermezzo ==
The intermezzo, in the 18th century, was a comic operatic interlude inserted between acts or scenes of an opera seria. These intermezzi could be substantial and complete works themselves, though they were shorter than the opera seria which enclosed them; typically they provided comic relief and dramatic contrast to the tone of the bigger opera around them, and often they used one or more of the stock characters from the opera or from the commedia dell'arte. In this they were the reverse of the Renaissance intermezzo, which usually had a mythological or pastoral subject as a contrast to a main comic play. Often they were of a burlesque nature, and characterized by slapstick comedy, disguises, dialect, and ribaldry. The most famous of all intermezzi from the period is Pergolesi's La serva padrona, which was an opera buffa that after the death of Pergolesi kicked off the Querelle des Bouffons.

In some cases the intermezzo repertory spread more quickly than did the opera seria itself; the singers were often renowned, the comic effects were popular, and intermezzi were relatively easy to produce and stage. In the 1730s the style spread around Europe, and some cities—for example Moscow—recorded visits and performances by troupes performing intermezzi years before any actual opera seria were done.

The intermède (the French equivalent of the intermezzo) was the single most important outside operatic influence in Paris in the mid-18th century, and helped create an entire new repertory of opera in France (see opéra comique).

The word was used (with a hint of irony) as the title of Richard Strauss's two-act opera, Intermezzo (1924), the scale of which far exceeds the intermezzo of tradition.

Many of the most celebrated intermezzi are from operas of the verismo period: Mascagni's Cavalleria rusticana and L'amico Fritz, Leoncavallo's Pagliacci, Puccini's Suor Angelica, Giordano's Fedora, and especially that from Massenet's Thais, which became known as the Méditation.

== Instrumental intermezzo ==
In the 19th century, the intermezzo acquired another meaning: an instrumental piece which was either a movement between two others in a larger work or a character piece that could stand on its own. These intermezzi show a wide variation in the style and function: in Mendelssohn's incidental music to A Midsummer Night's Dream the intermezzo serves as musical connecting material for action in Shakespeare's play; in chamber music by Mendelssohn and Brahms, the intermezzi are names for interior movements which would otherwise be called scherzi; and the piano intermezzi by Brahms, some of his last compositions, are sets of independent character pieces not intended to connect anything else together. Stylistically, intermezzi of the 19th century are usually lyrical and melodic, especially compared to the movements on either side, when they occur in larger works. The Brahms piano intermezzi in particular have an extremely wide emotional range, and are often considered some of the finest character pieces written in the 19th century.

Opera composers sometimes wrote instrumental intermezzi as connecting pieces between acts of operas. In this sense, an intermezzo is similar to the entr'acte. The most famous of this type of intermezzo is probably the intermezzo from Mascagni's Cavalleria rusticana. Puccini also wrote intermezzi for Manon Lescaut and Madama Butterfly, and examples exist by Wolf-Ferrari, Delius and others.

Also, incidental music for plays usually contained several intermezzi. Schubert's Rosamunde music as well as Grieg's Peer Gynt contained several intermezzi for the respective plays.

Schumann combined intermezzi in several of his works featuring piano, including the Piano Concerto Op. 54. Carnaval Op. 9 and intermezzi Op. 4

In the 20th century, the term was used occasionally. Shostakovich used it for one movement of his dark String Quartet No. 15, and again for the ninth piece of his Orchestral Suite for The Gadfly (1955). Bartók used the term for the fourth movement (of five) of his Concerto for Orchestra.

== See also ==
- Entr'acte
- Divertimento
- Interlude (disambiguation)
- Entremet
- Entremés

== Sources ==
- The New Harvard Dictionary of Music, ed. Don Randel. Cambridge, Massachusetts, Harvard University Press, 1986. ISBN 0-674-61525-5
- Articles "Intermezzo," "Intermedio" in The New Grove Dictionary of Music and Musicians, ed. Stanley Sadie. 20 vol. London, Macmillan Publishers Ltd., 1980. ISBN 1-56159-174-2
