= Interlude (painting) =

1963 painting by John Koch

Interlude, John Koch, 1963, 50 1/8 x 39 7/8 in. (127.3 x 101.3 cm)

Interlude is an oil-on-canvas work by mid-20th-century painter John Koch, that sits in the Memorial Art Gallery's permanent collection. It was completed in 1963 in the midst of the Civil Rights Movement. It is one of Koch's many known works featuring himself and a nude model in-studio. Interlude along with other pieces such as The Sculptor (1964), and Painter and Models (1972) present the theme of a scene in which artist and model are in the midst of taking a break. Nakedness of the model is still portrayed, but in an unprompted and naturalistic state different from whatever artificial pose they might have been posing in. The model is alongside Koch before his unfinished canvas, in his high end domestic space — a fourteen-room apartment on Central Park West. An interaction between Koch and the model, or the model and another subject, is customarily caught in frame. Interlude depicts Koch's wife, Dora Zaslavsky, handing the model a cup of tea for example. This unique take on the nude portrait is a stand out feature of Koch's body of work. In addition to subject matter, Koch's painting style reflects traditional European Realism, somewhat of a rare sight in post-war American Expressionism.

== Description ==
In John Koch's Interlude, a large oil on canvas work, there are three figures, a white man and woman and a black woman - John Koch, his wife Dora Zaslavsky, and model Rosetta Howard. Koch occupies space in the farthest layer of the composition, sitting back on a couch with a drink in one hand and the other propped up, his eyes focused on a tall canvas turned away from the viewer and lit by a single lamp. Dora wears a plain floor length quilted robe, occupying the middle ground, a gentle polite smile on her face with downturned eyes that are probably focused on the white teacup and saucer she is handing to the model. Koch's inclusion of this bright crimson creates a visual focus, and perhaps even a point of contrast to separate Howard's figure from the mostly brown tones she is composed within. Howard is completely nude and occupying the foreground, facing away from the viewer so that only her back, the top of her buttocks, and her outstretched arm reaching for the teacup is visible. Her hair is either short or pinned up, making the expanse of her back a prominent and outstanding part of the overall composition - a second central focal point.

Interlude is realistic due to its soft brushstrokes and use of lighting. There is no outright abstraction or experimentation with color, viewers are visually transported to the warmly lit room in which the scene in question takes place. The artist creates a highly detailed rendering through a small patch of yellow light on the wooden floor in the mid-ground, to the carefully painted creasing of the white sheets, where the nude woman sits.

In addition to brushstrokes and lighting, Interlude has a sharp foreground to background compositional layout that acts almost like a window into the painting, elevating the viewer's visual experience. From foreground to background, the viewer is closest to Howard looking into a room that ends with a large mirror on the furthest wall – a mirror that reflects windows on the invisible fourth wall, or the area from which we view the scene. The windows contain architecture-like shapes that suggest a world beyond the confines of the room, and the cool blue light they let in clearly indicates the primary light source of the painting. Use of the fourth wall adds to the composition's sharp foreground to background compositional layout, thus confirming its definitive use of realism.

In its entirety, this painting is a scene caught in motion, the moment a teacup is handed to a body leaning forward, possibly from a position previously held for the working artist in the background. It is the moment the artist takes a break and leans back to observe what he had been working on – a pregnant pause disturbed by sheets ruffling, the shuffling of feet on the wooden floor, and the clink of a teacup in its saucer.

== Art movements and contemporaneous influences ==
As a whole, Interlude depicts a scene that could be reality. Viewers might not find it hard to believe that there was a moment in a Manhattan apartment wherein an artist paints a model, and the artist's wife hands the model a cup of tea.

Abstraction, as it pertains to post-war American Expressionism, is not prevalent in Interlude's composition. In the aftermath of World War II, Abstract Expressionism gained traction — particularly in the New York art world. Stylistically, Abstract Expressionism is emotion-based and an exploration of the artist's subconscious. There is an element of spontaneity in the nature of Abstract Expressionist work, often portrayed intentionally by the artist despite the real behind-the-scenes planning that goes into the production of these pieces especially due to their large size.

Post-war New York emphasized Abstract Expressionism, yet Koch and his wife Dora were adamantly opposed. In fact, Koch was quoted as being "hostile" toward Abstract Expressionists and art critics. The Manhattan artist was strongly in favor of continuing to paint the way he wanted to regardless of what was fashionable in the New York art scene. Koch's desired art form was that of the old masters, in the form of traditional European Realism (not to be confused with 19th century French Realism, itself a complete shift away from the romanticization of scenes and portraiture seen in European painting for centuries). Koch was self-taught and honed his abilities by completing master studies, or copying the works of Spanish, French, Dutch, Italian, and Flemish old masters. His interests persisted in the eras of Baroque, Rococo, Impressionist, and other pre-Expressionist Western (European and American) art styles. Although European traditionalism provided the basis for Koch's stylistic choices, he continued to go against the grain just as he did with his denial of post-war Expressionism. Koch centered his body of work on a localized experience within his Upper West Side apartment, with himself, his wife Dora, their guests, or hired models as the primary subject matter, as opposed to singular depictions of the European upper crust lavishing in their inherited finery.

Interlude and many of Koch's other apartment-set scenes are reminiscent of older European painting styles in their depiction of reality. There is a subtle quality to the transitioning of tones, proportionality in the depiction of human figures as they are drawn in their architectural surroundings, and the soft, immersive use of lighting to create a realistic scene. Viewers might perceive Koch's detailed paintings from life to be similar to Abstract Expressionism's pure spontaneity, in that they describe exactly what he sees before him as it happens. The dynamics of setting the scene in terms of lighting based on time of day, and the naturalistic movements of characters caught as they are occurring, could support this analysis of pieces like Interlude. However, Koch's compositions are not spontaneous but are deeply thought out, as his preliminary sketches for Interlude will demonstrate in the following section. Koch's artistic process is reminiscent of setting a stage, with well fleshed out characters, placement of people and objects, and the angle from which the viewer is shown the scene.

While Koch had his art career submerged in European traditionalism, his wife Dora was a classical musician herself who gave private lessons when she was not helping her husband with his work. Within the Abstract Expressionist New York art world, Dora and John Koch created an enclave for themselves as appreciators and professionals of classical and traditional European art forms.

== Thematic analysis ==
When speaking about his inclusion of nude models in much of his work, Koch said "I find the back of a human being as eloquent and as expressive [as a face] ". Model Rosetta Howard's exposed back at the front of the frame is a focal point of the composition. Individual muscles and the play of light on her skin is painted carefully to create a very real, almost tangible image. Viewers might perceive aspects of her character from the strength and confidence of her posture and the assertive elegance with which she reaches out for the cup of tea being offered by Dora.

Interlude was completed in 1963 at the height of the Civil Rights Movement. This was a significant period of American history in which African Americans campaigned to "abolish legalized racial segregation, discrimination, and disenfranchisement." Sociopolitical tensions were high, making Koch's inclusion of an African American model, and the traditional nude portrait form in which she is presented, a notable talking point of Interlude.

A primary focus of Interlude's play on contemporary themes of race is in the exchange between Dora and Howard. In the preliminary sketches Study for "Interlude" I and Study for "Interlude" II that are in the Memorial Art Gallery's collection, Koch plays with the placement of compositional elements, including the space between Howard and Dora's outstretched arms. Koch's decision to leave a gap between Howard's hand and the incoming teacup and saucer was pivotal for the racial discussion found in Interlude. Given the historical context, the reversal of dynamics seen in the action of Dora serving Howard is noted, although it is unclear whether Koch did this with the intention of highlighting racial themes, or if it was simply to make the composition more dynamic.
