= Jean-Baptiste Defernex =

French sculptor

- Born: Jean-Baptiste Defernex circa 1729; Paris, France
- Died: circa 1783; Vincennes, France
- Education: Académie de Saint-Luc
- Known for: Sculpture

Jean-Baptist Defernex (c. 1729 – c. 1783) was a French sculptor, best known for his portrait busts, most often of women.

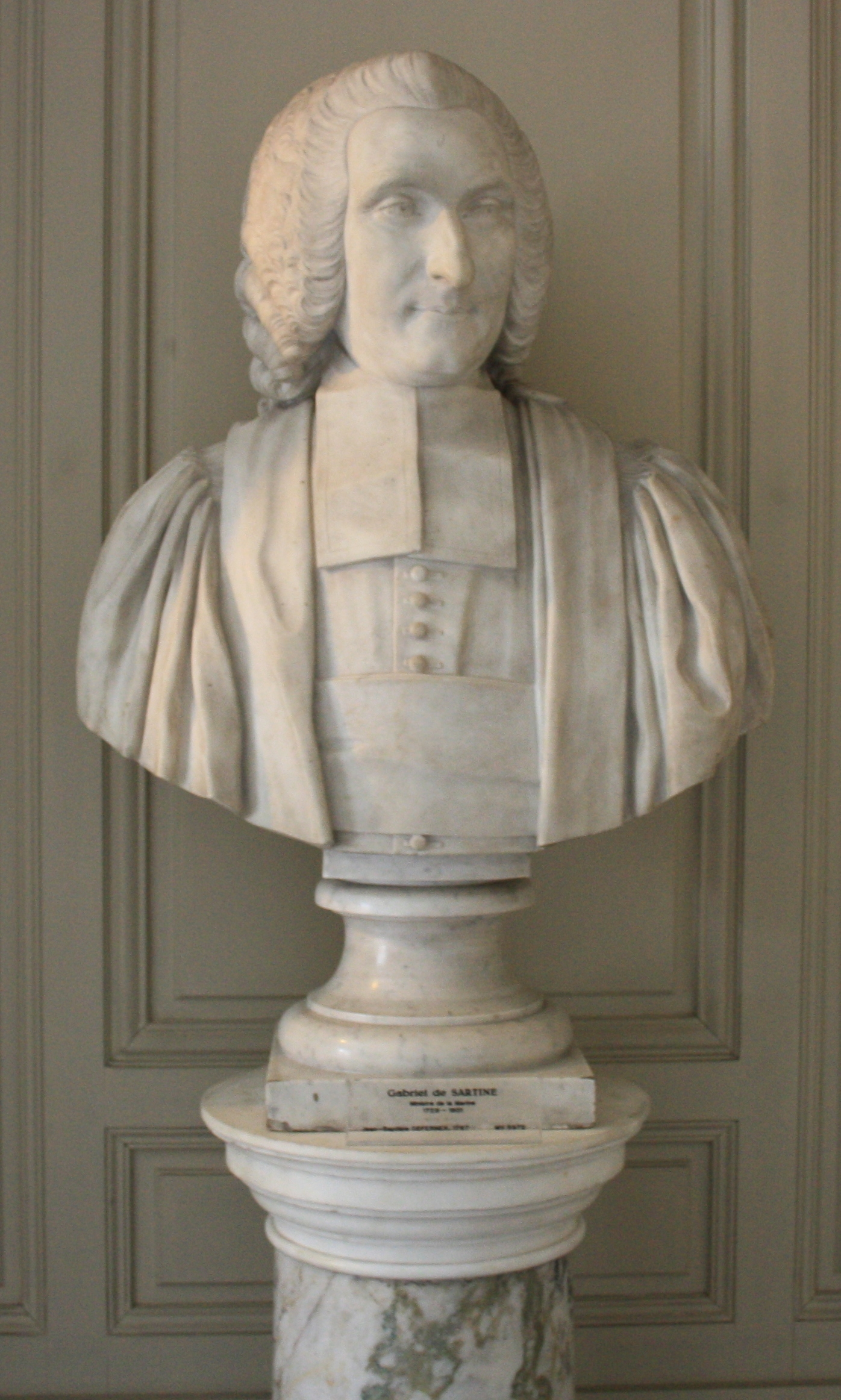
Bust of Gabriel de Sartine, Comte d'Alby of 1767 by Defernex

== Career ==
Little is known of Defernex's early training, but he started as a modeler at the Sèvres factory. He was sculptor to the Duc d'Orléans and worked on gilded lead statue groups of children at the Palais-Royal. Defernex was not a member of the Académie de peinture et de sculpture, but did attend the Académie de Saint-Luc. He also established a school for sculpture and drawing, where the noted Louis Jean-Jacques Durameau studied.

Defernex did not receive any official commissions, and his style seems to have been regarded as unfashionable during his day. The expressions of his portrait busts have been compared to those of Jean-Baptiste Greuze, and have been described as "...honest, unidealized, quite free from gallant flattery..." by the art historian Michael Levey.

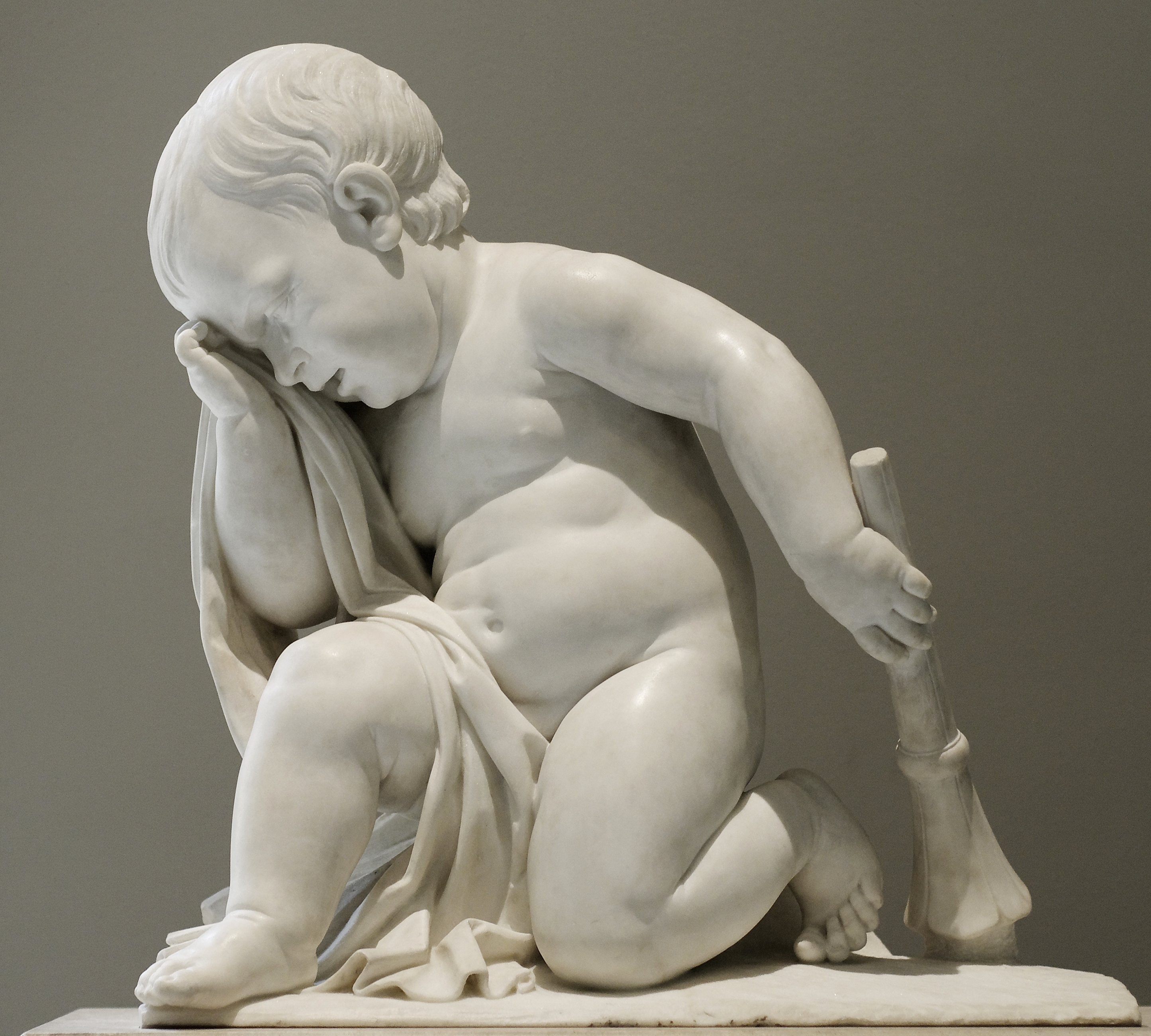
Distressed Genius of 1768 by Defernex

== Works ==
- Bust of Jean-Baptiste Réveillon of 1752, terracotta (Museum of Fine Arts, Boston)
- Bust of Marie-Anne Botot d'Angeville of 1752, terracotta (Museum of Fine Arts, Boston)
- Boy Playing with a Dog of c. 1754, porcelain (Cité de la Céramique)
- Bust of Marie-Justine Duronceray of 1757, terracotta (Louvre)
- The Milkmaid of c. 1757, porcelain (Louvre)
- The Butter Churner of c. 1760, porcelain (Cité de la Céramique)
- The Little Rock Cutter of c. 1762, porcelain (Palace of Versailles)
- Bust of Antoine-René de Voyer de Paulmy d’Argenson of c. 1765 (High Museum of Art)
- Bust of Anne-Marie Le Page of 1766, terracotta (British Museum)
- Bust of Gabriel de Sartine, Comte d'Alby of 1767, marble (Palace of Versailles)
- Distressed Genius of 1768, marble (Louvre)
- Bust of Georges-Louis Leclerc, Comte de Buffon of 1772, marble (Musée Buffon)
- Presumed Bust of Princesse de Béthune-Sully of 1773, marble (private collection)
- Bust of a Man of 1774, terracotta (Palais de l'Élysée)
- Bust of Prince Nicolas-Vassilievitch Repnin of 1764, marble (Musee Jacquemart-Andre)
