= Repeat After Me (Interlude) =

Song by the Weeknd

from the album After Hours
- Released: March 20, 2020
- Studio: Republic Studios (Los Angeles, California)
- Genre: R&B
- Length: 3:15
- Label: XO; Republic
- Songwriters: Abel Tesfaye; Kevin Parker; Daniel Lopatin
- Producers: Kevin Parker; OPN

Audio
- "Repeat After Me (Interlude)" on YouTube

"Repeat After Me (Interlude)" is a song by the Canadian singer-songwriter the Weeknd from his fourth studio album After Hours (2020), featuring vocals from the Australian musician Kevin Parker. The song was written by the Weeknd, along with its producers Oneohtrix Point Never and Parker. It was released on March 20, 2020, alongside the rest of its parent album.

== Background and composition ==
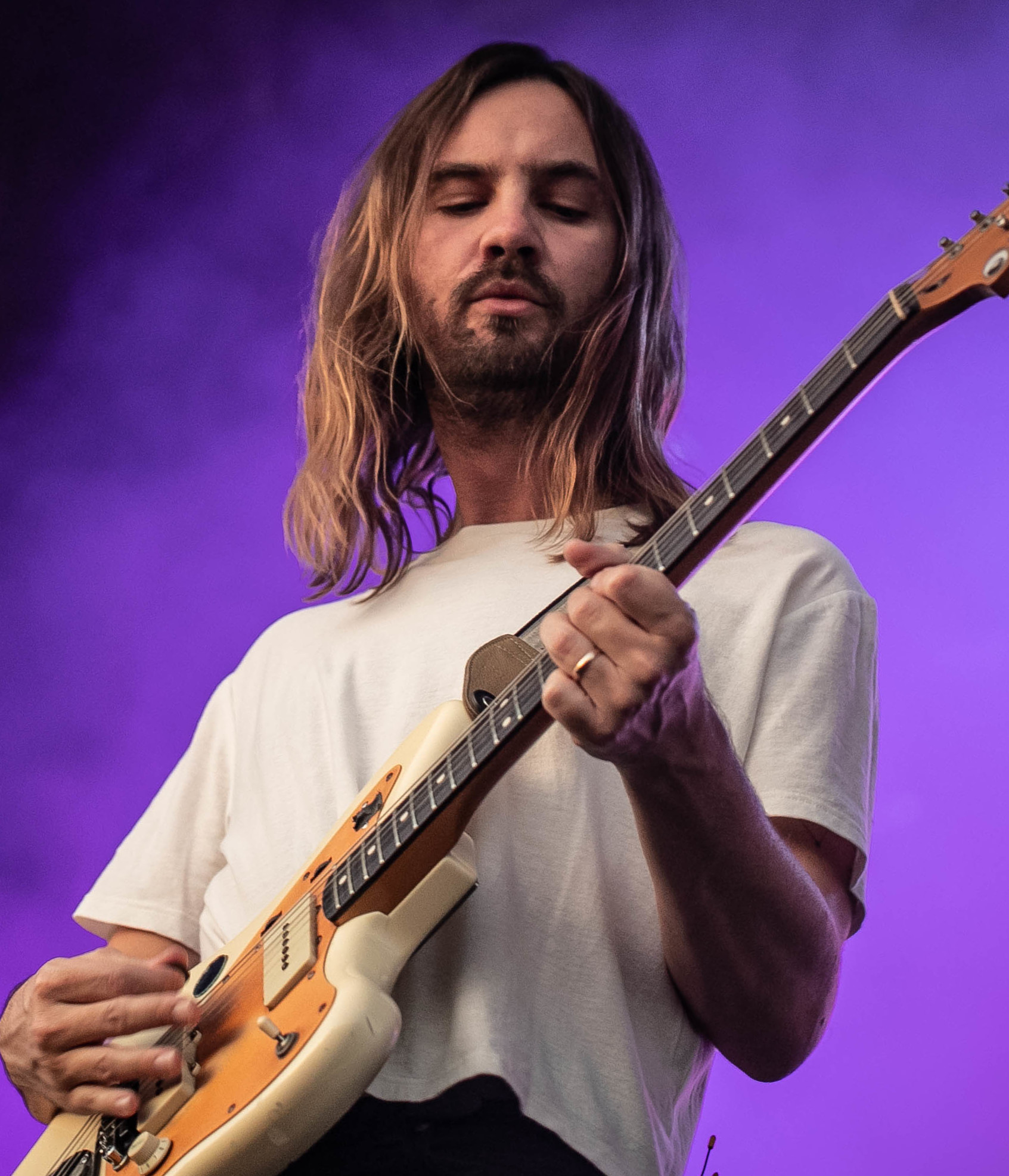
The Australian musician Kevin Parker has hidden vocals in the song's intro.

The Weeknd revealed the tracklist for its parent album, After Hours on March 17, 2020, with "Repeat After Me (Interlude)" shown as the album's twelfth track. It was then released on March 20, 2020, alongside the rest of its parent album.

An interlude between the album's first eleven tracks and the two darker closing tracks that follow (which are its title track and Until I Bleed Out), the song is primarily a R&B track with elements of trap. The lyrics of "Repeat After Me" are summarized to "you love me, not him" by Pitchfork, with its sound being described by Rolling Stone as a "wounded power ballad overlaid with spacey bubble-prog keyboards." The song's intro features garbled vocals from the Australian musician Kevin Parker, who is one of the song's producers.

== Critical reception ==
Critics complimented the song's sound upon release, with Billboard ranking "Repeat After Me (Interlude)" as the eleventh best song from After Hours, calling some lines such as "you don't love him if you're thinking of me," as "tweet worthy", and later stating that although trap occasionally feels like a crutch in Tesfaye's music, that this particular hip-hop transition is welcome, citing the continuation of infusing "airy, experimental sound." In a review of the song, Pitchfork called its lyrics "typical Weeknd fare—you love me, not him", but praised Tesfaye's vocals, citing its delicateness, and stating how his words leave a "wistful, transient impression". Pitchfork would later praise Parker's production, stating the song "[displays] Parker's palette, replete with an audible, Tame Impala—like electronic squiggle or two."

MTV would call "Repeat After Me (Interlude)" Parker's seventh best collab, calling the track "textbook Tame Impala" and citing how "satisfying" it is to hear Tesfaye's vocals over the instrumental.

== Commercial performance ==
Like all of the other tracks from After Hours, "Repeat After Me (Interlude)" charted at number 69 on the US Billboard Hot 100 issue dated April 4, 2020. It was the second lowest charting track from the album, above the closing track, "Until I Bleed Out".

== Personnel ==
- The Weeknd – vocals, songwriting
- Kevin Parker – vocals, songwriting, production
- Daniel Lopatin – songwriting, production
- Shin Kamiyama – engineering
- Matt Cohn – engineering, mixing
- Dave Kutch – mastering
- Kevin Peterson – mastering

== Charts ==
Chart (2020)	Peak position
Canada Hot 100 (Billboard)	62
France (SNEP)	130
Lithuania (AGATA)	49
Portugal (AFP)	81
Sweden Heatseeker (Sverigetopplistan)	8
UK Audio Streaming (OCC)	96
US Billboard Hot 100	69
US Hot R&B/Hip-Hop Songs (Billboard)	32
US Rolling Stone Top 100	31

== Release history ==
Region	Date	Format	Label(s)	Ref.
Various	March 20, 2020	Digital download; streaming	XO; Republic	
