= Les Plaisirs de l'Isle enchantée =

Festival performed at Versailles in 1664

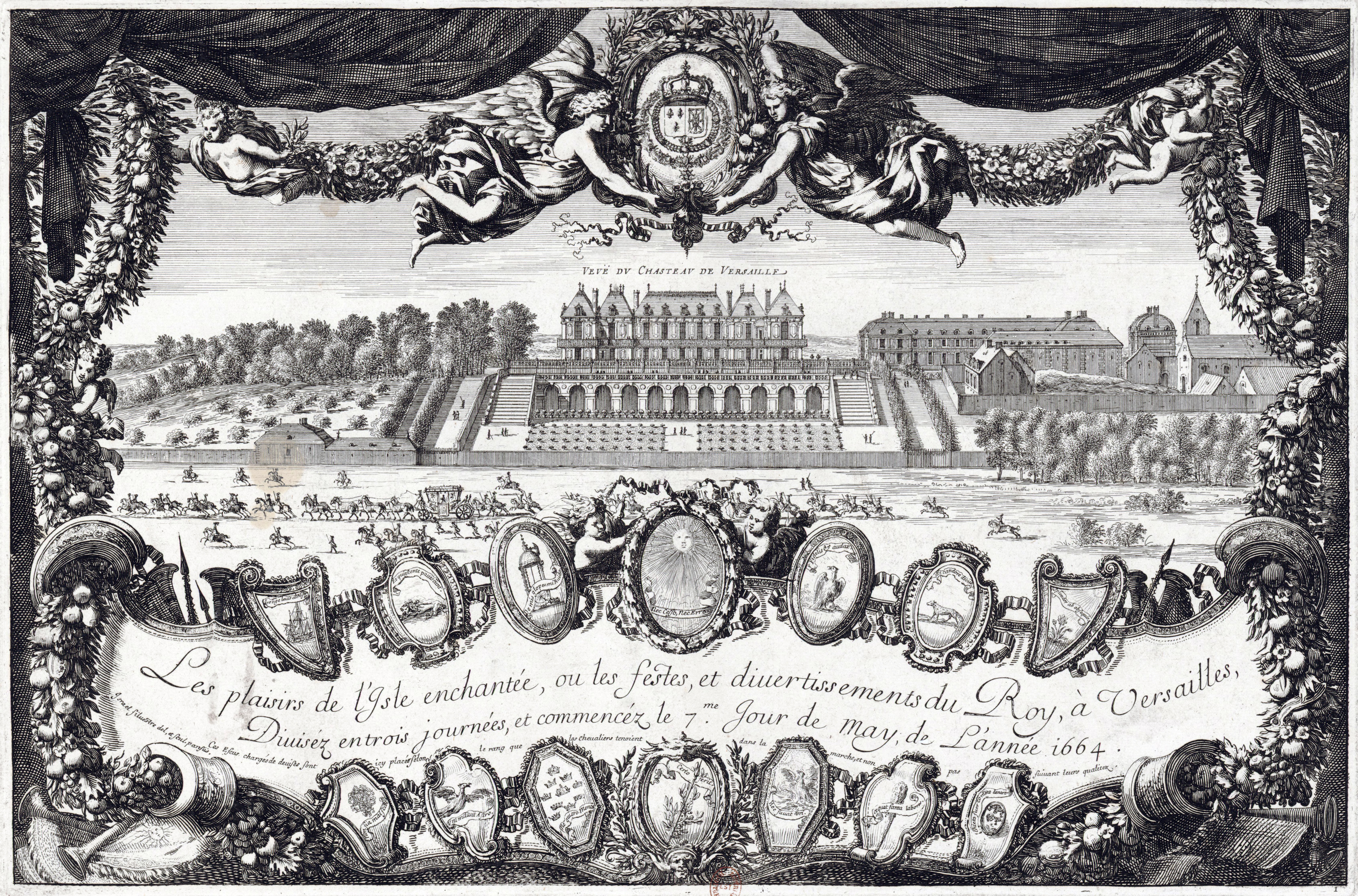
Frontispiece to the 1673 commemorative booklet, engraved by Israël Silvestre

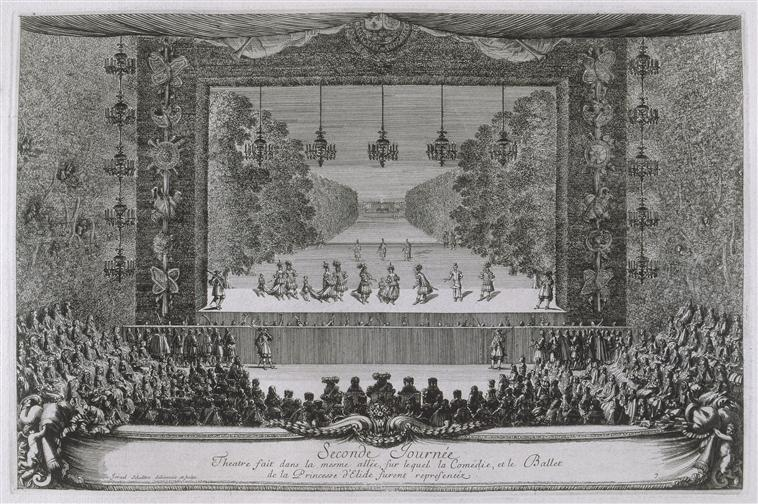
The theatre installed for the première of La Princesse d'Elide, engraved by Silvestre

Les Plaisirs de l'Isle enchantée ("The Pleasures of the Enchanted Island") was a multi-day festival presented from 7 to 13 May 1664 to the court of King Louis XIV of France in the newly landscaped gardens of Versailles. Unlike earlier royal festivals, given in urban settings, it was presented to an exclusive audience of about 600 invited guests.

At the King's request, it was organized by the Duke of Saint-Aignan, who took the title from a popular episode in cantos 6–8 and 10 of the 1516 Italian epic Orlando furioso by Ludovico Ariosto, in which the knight Ruggiero (in French, Roger) becomes a prisoner of love at the sorceress Alcina's court. The incidental music for the festivities was composed by Jean-Baptiste Lully, the verses were by Isaac de Benserade and Octave de Périgny, and the stage machinery and sets were designed by Carlo Vigarani.

Molière also played a large role in the organisation of festivities, which featured the premières of his plays La Princesse d'Élide and Tartuffe. Lully also composed the music for the six intermèdes of La Princesse d'Élide, which was performed on the second day of the festival in a temporary outdoor theatre installed in the gardens for the occasion. The audience had a view of the Basin of Apollo (at that time known as the Fountain of Swans) in which Vigarani had constructed a small-scale set depicting Alcine's magic palace. Fireworks were set off at the basin on the third day.

== Recordings ==
- Lully ou le Musicien du Soleil, Vol. III (besides an excerpt ("1ère journée") from Les Plaisirs de l'Ile Enchantée (LWV 22), also includes La Grotte de Versailles (LWV 39) and Le Carrousel (LWV 72)). Benjamin Lazar, speaker; Françoise Masset, Julie Hassler, Raphaële Kennedy, sopranos; Renaud Tripathi, tenor; Jean-Louis Georgel, baritone; Philippe Roche, bass; La Simphonie du Marais, conducted by Hugo Reyne. OCLC 702206016.
