= Lude =

Lude may refer to:

- Lude, name of a Chinese YouTube influencer
- Lude (stream), a stream in the Harz Mountains of Germany used by the historic mining industry
- Alternative spelling for Ludic language
- Short for Quaalude, brand name for Methaqualone
- Mike Lude (1922–2024), American athlete, coach and administrator
- Short for Honda Prelude
