= Dora Zaslavsky =

American pianist

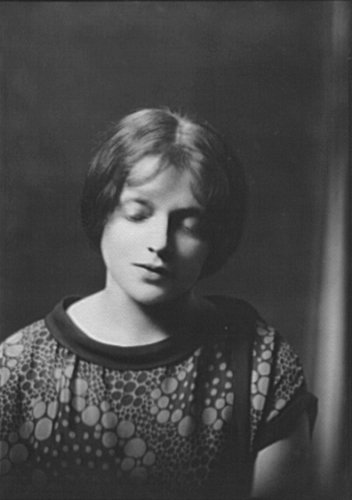
Dora Zaslavsky Koch

Dora Zaslavsky Koch (July 18, 1904 – September 9, 1987) was a Russian-born American pianist who was one of the first graduates of and later a teacher at the Manhattan School of Music.

== Early life ==
Zaslavsky was born in the Russian Empire in 1904, arriving in New York as an infant on February 22, 1905. Her family was Jewish, from the city of Kremenchuk in the oblast of Poltava. Her father Max had emigrated to the United States the previous year. She was traveling with her mother Celia née Fleisher, older siblings Joseph and Fay, and a young cousin. Another brother Israel (also George) was born six years later. Other sources give Zaslavsky’s birth year as 1905, but this is incompatible with the ship manifest information. The family story goes that Zaslavsky's musical talent was discovered "thanks to a large toy piano with real black and white keys" that her father, a peddler, had brought home for her.

She studied piano with Harold Bauer and Janet Schenck, founder of the Neighborhood Music School, which became the Manhattan School of Music, and she was the school's first graduate in 1920. Zaslavsky continued her studies with Wilhelm Backhaus in Philadelphia and Paris, then returned to New York to take up her teaching career at the Manhattan School, where she taught alongside Constance Keene. Among her students were David Bar-Ilan and Abbey Simon.

== Marriages ==
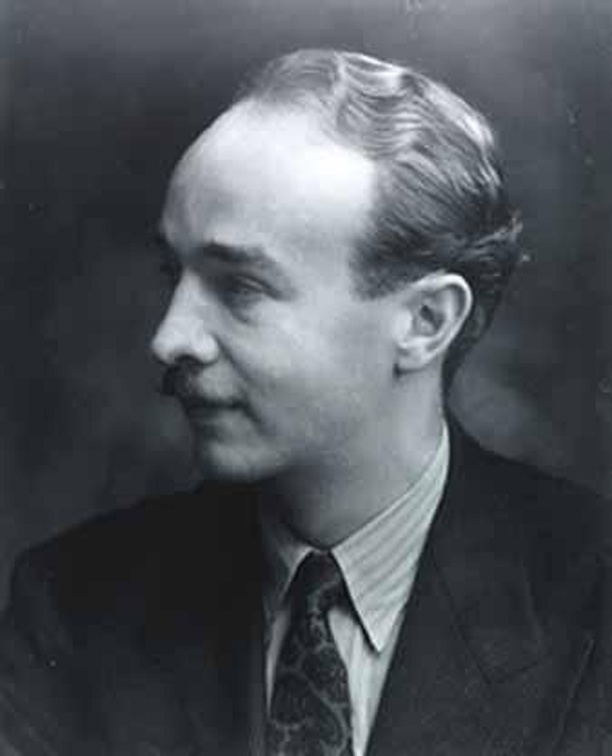
John Koch

Zaslavsky married New Yorker Herbert Spencer Schwartz (also Herbert Thomas Schwartz) on September 12, 1927. He was a gifted musician whose mother had hoped he would become a concert pianist, as Zaslavsky’s father had hoped for her. Schwartz, however, chose to pursue a college education rather than continue in music. At the time of their marriage he was beginning his third undergraduate year at the University of Michigan in Ann Arbor, thinking of becoming a physician. He was accepted into medical school but dropped out after one semester, entering Columbia University the following fall to study philosophy. He wrote his doctoral thesis on the philosophy of music, graduating in 1933. Zaslavsky and Schwartz were amicably divorced on August 10, 1935, each of them interested in someone else at the time.

Zaslavsky's second husband, John Koch, grew up in Ann Arbor, and joined the art scene in Paris at age nineteen, where he lived for nearly five years, returning in June, 1933, to Ann Arbor. When he settled in Manhattan the following year, he already knew Zaslavsky, either having met her in New York City before he left for Paris, or having met her during one of her visits to Paris. He was "determined to win her." Koch stayed first with a friend, then moved to a room next door to the one at 56th & Madison in which Zaslavsky was living with her sister Fay. Koch and Zaslavsky were married on December 23, 1935. Their first apartment was at 865 First Avenue in Midtown Manhattan. The bedroom served as his studio; the living room with piano was her studio.
