= La Princesse d'Élide =

1664 French play by Molière

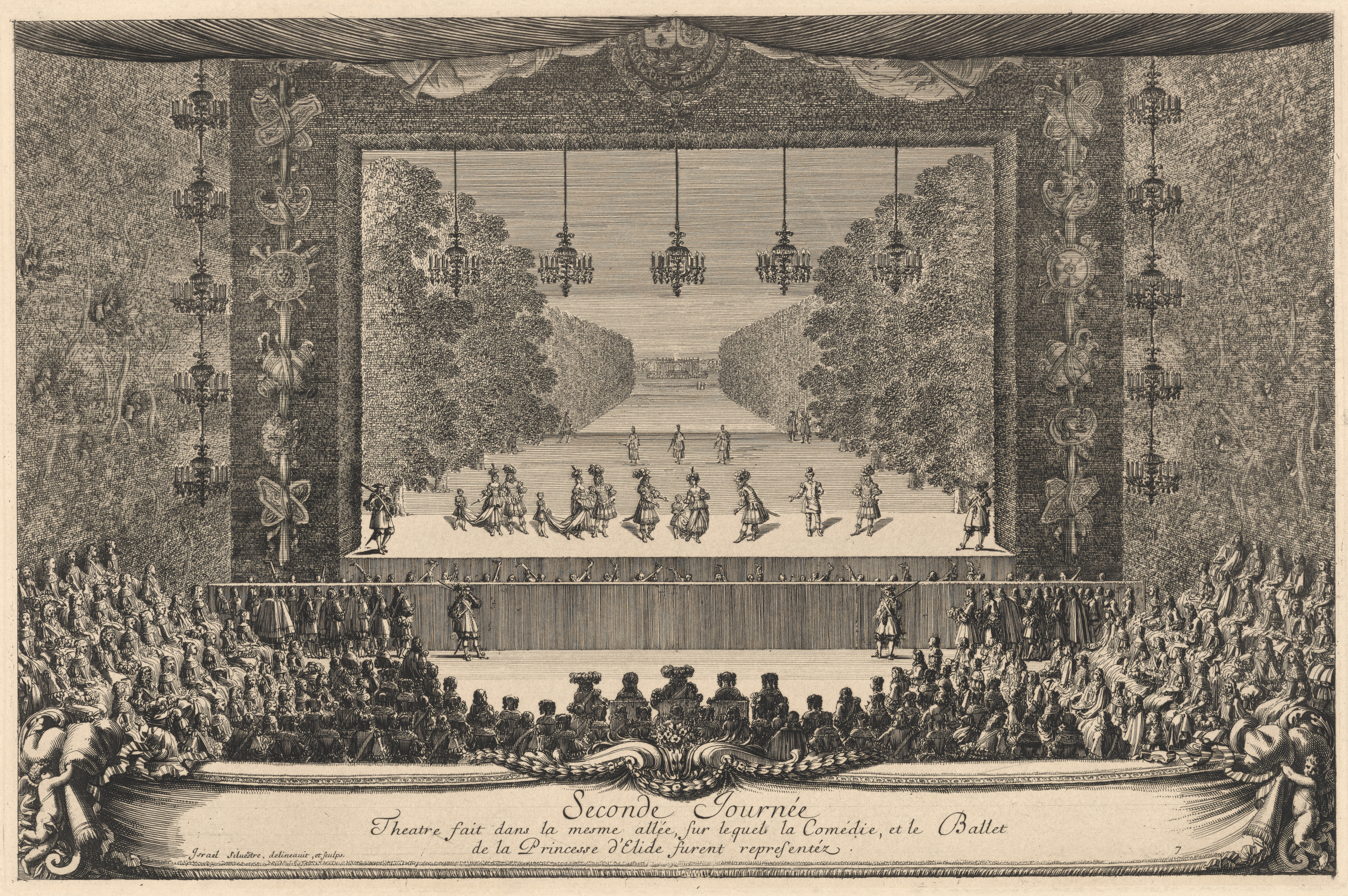
Premiere of La Princesse d'Élide at Versailles in 1664

La Princesse d'Élide (The Princess of Elis) is a 1664 French comic play ("comédie galante") in 5 acts in verse and prose by Molière, who based it on Agustin Moreto y Cabaña's 1654 Spanish play El desdén con el desdén (Scorn for Scorn) but moved the location to Elis in Greece. The play includes six intermèdes with verses by Molière and music by Jean-Baptiste Lully.

It was first performed on 8 May 1664 as part of Louis XIV's multi-day royal festival Les Plaisirs de l'Isle enchantée at Versailles and revived in July four times for the court at the Palace of Fontainebleau and on 9 November for public performances at the Théâtre du Palais-Royal in Paris, where it ran until 4 January 1665, its twenty-fifth representation and the last by the troupe of Molière.

Thompson wrote: "Here Molière's troupe staged a play-within-the-play, a new comedy-ballet called La Princesse d'Elide, which included a number of pastoral interludes that mirrored the setting surrounding the audience. Just as Le Nôtre's gardens mixed heroic grandeur with the simple charms of nature, so Molière's prancing satyrs and bucolic dancers played sophisticated games that mixed simplicity and artifice. The plot revolved around a princess who was apparently immune to love but who was eventually won over by a young man who feigned indifference in order to entice her. At the outset Princess Elide was presented as a spirited beauty who loved hunting more than she sought love, and it cannot have been an accident that Louise de la Vallière was dedicated to the chase. Indeed the whole play might be seen to justify Louis' passion for her."

== Bibliography ==
- Garreau, Joseph E. (1984). "Molière", vol. 3, pp. 397–418 in McGraw-Hill Encyclopedia of World Drama, Stanley Hochman, editor in chief. New York: McGraw-Hill. ISBN 9780070791695.
- Lancaster, Henry Carrington (1936). A History of French Dramatic Literature in the Seventeenth Century. Part III: The Period of Molière 1652–1672. New York: Gordian Press (1966 reprint). OCLC 477005751.
- Powell, John S. (2000). Chapter 15: "The Public Reception of a Court Success: La Princesse d'Élide", pp. 337–353, in his Music and Theatre in France 1600–1680. Oxford: Oxford University Press. ISBN 9780198165996.
- Wine, Kathleen (2002), "Princesse d'Élide, La", pp. 391–392, in The Molière Encyclopedia, edited by James F. Gaines. Westport, Connecticut/London: Greenwood Press. ISBN 9780313312557.
- Thompson, Ian (2006), pp. 134-135, in The Sun King's Garden, London: Bloomsbury Publishing Inc. ISBN 9780747576488.
