= Louis Jean-Jacques Durameau =

French painter

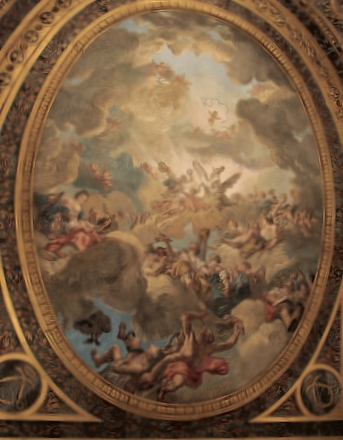
Louis Jean-Jacques Durameau, Plafond painting in the Royal Opera of Versailles, ca. 1770

Louis Jean-Jacques Durameau (French pronunciation: [lwi ʒɑ̃ ʒak dyʁamo]; Paris, 5 October 1733- Versailles, 3 September 1796) was a French painter.

== Life ==
A son of Jacques Durameau (master printer in intaglio) and Marie Rocou (or Rocan), he was intended for an engraver by his father and trained in drawing at the studio of the sculptor Jean-Baptiste Defernex. He then entered the studio of Jean-Baptiste Marie Pierre. In 1757, he won the Grand prix de Rome, with the subject Élie ressuscite le fils de la Sunamite. He died at the age of 62 of a pulmonary congestion after a trip to Paris on foot.
