= Intermède =

18th-century opera genre

Intermède (also intermédie, intramède, entremets) is a French theatrical entertainment or spectacle, often involving song and dance and inserted between the acts of a play. It was similar to the Italian intermedio.

The context in which the intermède was performed has changed over time. During the 16th century they were court entertainments in which ballet was an important element. The intermède was sometimes given between the acts of spoken plays, especially in the 17th century when they were performed with the works of Pierre Corneille and Jean Racine. Molière and Lully experimented with the form in their comédies-ballets, sometimes coordinating the content with the plot of the play in which they were inserted, for example, in La Princesse d'Élide (1664).

During the Age of Enlightenment, the term was used for one-act Italian operas, as performed in 18th-century France, either in the original language or in French translation (such as La servante maîtresse, the French version of Pergolesi's La serva padrona), but also for original French works of similar style in one or two acts, with or without spoken dialogue. During the course of the century, the intermède gradually disappeared as it was developed and transformed into the opéra comique.

During the 19th and 20th centuries, the term was occasionally used, usually anachronistically, by opera composers, but also as a term in relation to instrumental music.

== Sources ==
- Bartlet, M. Elizabeth C. (1992). "Intermède" in The New Grove Dictionary of Opera, edited by Stanley Sadie (London, 1992) ISBN 0-333-73432-7
- Anthony, James R.; Bartlet, M. Elizabeth C. (2001). "Intermède [intermédie, intramède, entremets]" in The New Grove Dictionary of Music and Musicians, second edition, edited by Stanley Sadie. London: Macmillan. Reprint at Grove Music Online (subscription, Wikilibrary access, or UK public library membership required).
