= Belly discography =

- Studio albums: 4
- Singles: 24
- Mixtapes: 12

The discography of Palestinian-Canadian rapper Belly consists of four studio albums, 12 mixtapes and 24 singles.

== Albums ==
=== Studio albums ===
List of albums, with selected chart positions
| Title | Album details | Peak chart positions | | Certifications |
| Title | Album details | CAN | US | Certifications |
|---|---|---|---|---|
| The Revolution | Released: 5 June 2007; Label: CP; Format: CD, digital download | 27 | — | MC: Gold |
| Immigrant | Released: 12 October 2018; Label: Roc Nation, XO; Format: Digital download, streaming | 31 | 169 | |
| See You Next Wednesday | Released: 27 August 2021; Label: Roc Nation, XO; Format: Digital download, streaming | 26 | 191 | |
| 96 Miles from Bethlehem | Released: 30 May 2024; Label: SALXCO, UAM; Format: Digital download, streaming | — | — | |
"—" denotes a title that did not chart, or was not released in that territory.

=== Mixtapes ===
List of mixtapes, with selected details and selected chart positions
| Title | Mixtape details | Peak chart positions | |
| Title | Mixtape details | CAN | US Heat. |
|---|---|---|---|
| Death Before Dishonor: Vol. 1 | Released: 2005; Label: Self-released; Format: Digital download | — | — |
| Death Before Dishonor: Vol. 2 | Released: 13 September 2005; Label: Self-released; Format: Digital download | — | — |
| Death Before Dishonor: Vol. 3 | Released: 2007; Label: Self-released; Format: Digital download | — | — |
| Back for the First Time Vol. 1 (with DJ Smallz) | Released: 23 July 2010; Label: Self-released; Format: Digital download | — | — |
| Sleepless Nights (with DJ Ill Will) | Released: 4 March 2011; Label: Self-released; Format: Digital download | — | — |
| Belly & Kurupt The Lost Tapes 2008 (with Kurupt) | Released: 19 May 2011; Label: Self-released; Format: Digital download | — | — |
| The Greatest Dream I Never Had (with DJ Drama) | Released: 11 November 2011; Label: Self-released; Format: Digital download | — | — |
| Up for Days | Released: 7 May 2015; Label: Roc Nation, XO; Format: Digital download | — | — |
| Another Day in Paradise | Released: 27 May 2016; Label: Roc Nation, XO; Format: Digital download | — | — |
| Inzombia | Released: 11 November 2016; Label: Roc Nation, XO; Format: Digital download | — | 25 |
| Mumble Rap | Released: 6 October 2017; Label: Roc Nation, XO; Format: Digital download | 55 | — |
| Mumble Rap 2 | Released: 19 May 2023; Label: Roc Nation, XO; Format: Digital download | — | — |
"—" denotes a title that did not chart, or was not released in that territory.

== Singles ==
=== As lead artist ===
List of singles as lead artist, with selected chart positions and certifications
| Title | Year | Peak chart positions | | | | Certifications | Album(s) |
| Title | Year | CAN | US | US R&B/HH | US Rap | Certifications | Album(s) |
|---|---|---|---|---|---|---|---|
| "Pressure" (featuring Ginuwine) | 2006 | 10 | — | — | — | | The Revolution |
| "Don't Be Shy" (featuring Nina Sky) | 2007 | 45 | — | — | — | | The Revolution |
| "I'm the Man" (featuring Kurupt) | 2007 | — | — | — | — | | The Revolution |
| "Ridin'" (featuring Mario Winans) | 2007 | 80 | — | — | — | | The Revolution |
| "Hot Girl" (featuring Snoop Dogg) | 2009 | 58 | — | — | — | | Back for the First Time Vol. 1 and Sleepless Nights 1.5 |
| "Back Against the Wall" (featuring Kobe) | 2011 | — | — | — | — | | Sleepless Nights 1.5 |
| "I Drink I Smoke" (featuring Snoop Dogg) | 2011 | — | — | — | — | | Sleepless Nights 1.5 |
| "Purple Drugs" | 2011 | — | — | — | — | | Sleepless Nights 1.5 |
| "Num8ers" | 2011 | — | — | — | — | | Sleepless Nights 1.5 |
| "Hartwin Cole" (featuring Faber Drive) | 2011 | — | — | — | — | | Sleepless Nights 1.5 |
| "1200" (featuring Juicy J) | 2012 | — | — | — | — | | Trap Hour |
| "Might Not" (featuring the Weeknd) | 2015 | 28 | 68 | 21 | 11 | MC: 2× Platinum; RIAA: Platinum | Up for Days |
| "No Option" | 2015 | — | — | — | — | | Up for Days |
| "Zanzibar" (featuring Juicy J) | 2016 | — | — | — | — | | Another Day In Paradise |
| "You" (featuring Kehlani) | 2016 | — | — | — | — | | Another Day In Paradise |
| "Ballerina" | 2016 | 48 | — | — | — | | Another Day In Paradise |
| "Re Up" (featuring Nav) | 2017 | — | — | — | — | | Inzombia |
| "P.O.P." | 2017 | — | — | — | — | | Mumble Rap |
| "Man Listen" | 2017 | — | — | — | — | | Non-album singles |
| "4 Days" (featuring YG) | 2018 | — | — | — | — | | Non-album singles |
| "Maintain" (featuring Nav) | 2018 | 97 | — | — | — | | Immigrant |
| "What You Want" (featuring the Weeknd) | 2018 | 47 | — | — | — | MC: Gold | Immigrant |
| "Money on the Table" (featuring Benny the Butcher) | 2021 | — | — | — | — | | See You Next Wednesday |
| "IYKYK" | 2021 | — | — | — | — | | See You Next Wednesday |
| "Zero Love" (featuring Moneybagg Yo) | 2021 | — | — | — | — | | See You Next Wednesday |
| "Better Believe" (with the Weeknd and Young Thug) | 2021 | 23 | 88 | 31 | 25 | | See You Next Wednesday |
| "Die for It" (with the Weeknd featuring Nas) | 2021 | 65 | — (Note: "Die for It" did not enter the US Billboard Hot 100, but peaked at number 21 on the US Bubbling Under Hot 100 chart.) | — | — | | See You Next Wednesday |
| "Requiem" (featuring Nav) | 2021 | — | — | — | — | | See You Next Wednesday |
| "Flowers" | 2021 | — | — | — | — | | See You Next Wednesday |
| "American Nightmare" | 2023 | — | — | — | — | | Mumble Rap 2 |
| "Ambiance" | 2023 | — | — | — | — | | Mumble Rap 2 |
| "Cocaine Spoon" (featuring Rick Ross) | 2023 | — | — | — | — | | Mumble Rap 2 |
| "Patience vs Patients" | 2024 | — | — | — | — | | 96 Miles from Bethlehem |
"—" denotes a title that did not chart, or was not released in that territory.
