= All I Know (The Weeknd song) =

Song by the Weeknd featuring Future

from the album Starboy
- Released: November 25, 2016
- Genre: R&B; trap
- Length: 5:21
- Label: XO; Republic
- Songwriters: Abel Tesfaye; Nayvadius Wilburn; Benjamin Diehl; Magnus Høiberg; Ahmad Balshe
- Producers: Ben Billions; Cashmere Cat; The Weeknd

"All I Know" is a song by Canadian singer-songwriter the Weeknd featuring American rapper Future, released as a track from the former's third studio album Starboy (2016). The song was written by both artists alongside Belly as well as Ben Billions & Cashmere Cat, who produced the song with the Weeknd.

== Background and release ==
The Weeknd revealed the track list for his third studio album, Starboy, on November 17, 2016, with Future shown to be on the seventeenth track, "All I Know".

Before the release of Starboy, the Weeknd released a short film titled Mania, on November 23, 2016, which featured multiple tracks from Starboy, including "All I Know". The song was one of the two collaborations with Future featured on the album, the other being "Six Feet Under".

== Commercial performance ==
Like the rest of the tracks from Starboy, "All I Know'" charted on the Billboard Hot 100, reaching number 46. It charted on both the R&B Songs chart and Hot R&B/Hip-Hop Songs chart. The song also charted and peaked at number 38 on the Canadian Hot 100, reaching the Top 40.

== Charts ==
Chart (2016–17)	Peak position
Canada Hot 100 (Billboard)	38
Czech Republic Singles Digital (ČNS IFPI)	40
France (SNEP)	184
Netherlands (Single Top 100)	99
Portugal (AFP)	68
UK Singles (OCC)	76
UK Hip Hop/R&B (OCC)	23
US Billboard Hot 100	46
US Hot R&B/Hip-Hop Songs (Billboard)	21

== Certifications ==
Region	Certification	Certified units/sales
Australia (ARIA)	Gold	35,000^{‡}
Canada (Music Canada)	Gold	40,000^{‡}
^{‡} Sales+streaming figures based on certification alone.
