= Maverick (management) =

American music management group

- Industry: Entertainment
- Founded: October 2014
- Founder: Guy Oseary
- Headquarters: Beverly Hills, California
- Website: http://maverick.com/

Maverick is an American music management group formed in 2014 by Guy Oseary. A revival of the Maverick company (1992–2009), the management group also adopts the company's logo.

== History ==
In 2014, Oseary announced that he was forming a joint venture with Live Nation Entertainment to establish a management group, amalgamating with other managers and their companies into one venture. Oseary originally was joined by Reign Deer's Larry Rudolph and Adam Leber, Blueprint Group's Gee Roberson, Cortez Bryant and Shawn Gee, Quest Management's Scott Rodger, Spalding Entertainment's Clarence Spalding, Laffitte Management's Ron Laffitte and I Am Other's Caron Veazey. All nine managers combined their companies together, rebranded them and their respective employees as "Maverick" on October 17, 2014.

In March 2015, founder Madonna released her album Rebel Heart, featuring the Maverick logo on the back cover. This signified a new collaboration between Oseary, Madonna's manager, and Live Nation Entertainment as a management group, not a record label.

In May 2016, Wassim Slaiby, CEO of XO, joined the Maverick Management team with The Weeknd, Belly and Massari.

In November 2017, Maverick parent company Live Nation announced they had paid an undisclosed sum to acquire Big Loud and their six-artist roster.

In July 2018 Maverick announced the signing of Latin pop artist Ricky Martin under manager Lee Anne Callahan-Longo based out of the Maverick New York office.

On August 3, 2018, the band Aerosmith joined the Maverick under Larry Rudolph, who has managed Steven Tyler since 2014.

As of August 2018, Oseary and Thompson were accompanied by artist managers Adam Leber, Lee Anne Callahan-Longo, Larry Rudolph, Gee Roberson, Cortez Bryant, Shawn Gee, Scott Rodger, Wassim “Sal” Slaiby, Clarence Spalding, Kevin “Chief” Zaru and Seth England. Maverick had offices in Los Angeles, New York, Nashville and London.

In April 2021, the Red Hot Chili Peppers joined Guy Oseary’s roster.
