= 96 Miles from Bethlehem =

Studio album by Belly
- Released: 30 May 2024
- Length: 18:40
- Labels: SALXCO; UAM
- Producers: The ANMLS; Belly; Bishara Al-Khell; DaHeala; DannyBoyStyles; Sanaa Moussa

Belly chronology
Mumble Rap 2 (2023)	96 Miles from Bethlehem (2024)

Singles from 96 Miles from Bethlehem
- 1. "Patience vs Patients" Released: 28 May 2024

96 Miles from Bethlehem is the fourth studio album by Palestinian-Canadian rapper Belly. It was released through SALXCO and Universal Arabic Music (UAM) on 30 May 2024. The album contains guest appearances from fellow Palestinian musicians Saint Levant, Ibrahim Maalouf, Elyanna, and MC Abdul. Production was handled by Belly himself, DaHeala, DannyBoyStyles, Bishara Al-Khell, Sanaa Moussa, and the ANMLS. The album was supported by one single, "Patience vs Patients". It serves as the follow-up to Belly's previous album, See You Next Wednesday (2021), as well as his mixtape, Mumble Rap 2 (2023). As a native of the city Jenin in Palestine, it sees Belly speak about the ongoing Israeli–Palestinian conflict as he also references his Palestinian roots, while it is also his first project not to have profanity in any song. The album also marks his shortest project yet, clocking in at 18 minutes.

== Release and promotion ==
On 2 December 2023, Belly announced the title of the album through an Instagram story, where he confirmed its title and revealed that it would be released in February of the next year, which did not happen for unknown reasons. On 28 May 2024, he released the lead single of the album, "Patience vs Patients", alongside its official music video. The following day, Belly shared the cover art of the album and announced that it would be released the next day, while also stating that the profits from the album would be donated towards "Gaza, the West Bank, and other affected areas around Palestine".

== Music and lyrics ==
Belly described 96 Miles from Bethlehem as "the gift, curse, and fate of being Palestinian". The title of the album references how the distance between his hometown of Jenin in Palestine and its city of Bethlehem. Some of the songs include spoken Arabic interludes and Middle Eastern melodies. Its lyrics are in Belly's perspective as a Palestinian on the ongoing war in the Gaza Strip. On the second track of the album, "Blue Bags", he references the shootings of Palestinian people and places as he raps: "It's misdirection, sadistic with these twisted methods / Restricted weapons, inflicted such a sick oppression / They hit the Masjid, irfaa, pick up, it's disconnected / Can't get reception, but y'all don't get the message / Black clouds and toxic rain and bright blue bags for coffins / Send me to the crossing, Lord". On the next track, "Patience vs Patience", he also touches more about that topic: "Drones, helicopters, killing our doctors / Turned the hospital to a hospice / While you watched it". On the last track of the album, "The Gift, the Curse, and the Fate", Belly references the deaths of Palestinians and reflects on their early lives: "Mirages of olive branches, that never extend to truth / Lining the Orwellian orchard of forgotten souls, and martyred youth, generations of teardrops watering trees that once grew".

== Track listing ==
96 Miles from Bethlehem track listing
No.	Title	Writer(s)	Producer(s)	Length
1.	"Metal Birds"	Ahmad Balshe; Jason Quenneville; Danny Schofield; Nicki Lamb	Belly; DaHeala; DannyBoyStyles	1:34
2.	"Blue Bags"	Balshe; Schofield; Bashar Shamout	Belly; DannyBoyStyles; Bishara Al-Khell; Sanaa Moussa	2:06
3.	"Patience vs Patients"	Balshe; Quenneville; Schofield	Belly; DannyBoyStyles; DaHeala	1:33
4.	"Jenin's Song"	Balshe; Quenneville; Schofield; Richard Muñoz; Faris Al-Majed	Belly; DaHeala; Specialk	2:08
5.	"Crucifix"	Balshe; Muñoz; Al-Majed; Lamb	Belly; the ANMLS	1:40
6.	"Baroudeh" (with Saint Levant)	Balshe; Marwan Abdelhamid; Quenneville	Belly; DaHeala; Al-Khell; Moussa	2:35
7.	"Carry Me" (featuring Ibrahim Maalouf)	Balshe; Ibrahim Maalouf; Schofield; Muñoz; Al-Majed	Belly; DannyBoyStyles; the ANMLS	2:01
8.	"Maktub" (with Elyanna and MC Abdul)	Balshe; Elian Margieh; Abdelrahman Al-Shantti; Quenneville; Schofield; Feras Margieh; Abeer Margieh	Belly; DaHeala	3:28
9.	"The Gift, the Curse, and the Fate"	Balshe	Belly; DaHeala	1:31
Total length:				18:40
