= What You Want (Belly song) =

2018 single by Belly featuring The Weeknd

Single by Belly featuring the Weeknd

from the album Immigrant
- Released: May 24, 2018
- Recorded: 2017–2018
- Genre: Pop rap
- Length: 3:15
- Label: Roc Nation; XO
- Songwriters: Ahmad Balshe; Abel Tesfaye; Richard Muñoz; Faris Al-Majed; Navraj Goraya; Henry Walter
- Producers: The ANMLS; Nav; Cirkut

Belly singles chronology
| "Maintain" (2018) | "What You Want" (2018) | "Chalice" (2018) |

The Weeknd singles chronology
| "Call Out My Name" (2018) | "What You Want" (2018) | "Lost in the Fire" (2019) |

Music video
- "What You Want" on YouTube

"What You Want" is a single by Palestinian-Canadian rapper and singer Belly featuring fellow Canadian singer-songwriter the Weeknd. It was released on May 24, 2018, for streaming and digital download by Roc Nation and XO. The song was written alongside producers the ANMLS, Nav, and Cirkut.

== Background ==
"What You Want" is a single off the Immigrant album. It features guest vocals from fellow XO labelmate the Weeknd. This would be their second collaboration, following Belly's 2015 single, "Might Not". The song was officially released on May 24, 2018. Belly told Billboard in an interview, "It was the most fun I ever had shooting a video, me and Abel always have amazing chemistry when we work, but this one takes the cake."

== Music video ==
The music video was released on May 30, 2018. As of June 2023, the music video has received over 11 million views on YouTube.

== Charts ==
| Chart (2018) | Peak position |
|---|---|
| Canada Hot 100 (Billboard) | 47 |
| Canada CHR/Top 40 (Billboard) | 16 |
| Canada Hot AC (Billboard) | 22 |
| US Rhythmic Airplay (Billboard) | 17 |

== Certifications ==
| Region | Certification | Certified units/sales |
|---|---|---|
| Canada (Music Canada) | Platinum | 80,000^{‡} |
^{‡} Sales+streaming figures based on certification alone.

== Release history ==
| Region | Date | Format | Label(s) | Ref. |
|---|---|---|---|---|
| United States | May 24, 2018 | Digital download | XO; Roc Nation | |
