= Six Feet Under (The Weeknd song) =

Song by the Weeknd

from the album Starboy
- Released: November 25, 2016
- Studio: Conway
- Genre: R&B; trap
- Length: 3:58
- Label: XO; Republic
- Songwriters: Abel Tesfaye; Nayvadius Wilburn; Martin McKinney; Benjamin Diehl; Leland Wayne; Henry Walter; Ahmad Balshe; Jason Quenneville
- Producers: Doc McKinney; Cirkut; Metro Boomin; Ben Billions; The Weeknd

"Six Feet Under" is a song by Canadian singer-songwriter the Weeknd, from his third studio album Starboy (2016). It features additional vocals from American rapper Future and was written by both artists alongside Belly, DaHeala, Doc McKinney, Ben Billions, Metro Boomin, and Cirkut, with the latter four producing it with the Weeknd. It is one of the two collaborations between the Weeknd and Future to be featured on the album, the other being "All I Know". The artists previously collaborated on Future's "Low Life".

== Chart performance ==
Like the rest of the tracks from Starboy, "Six Feet Under" charted on the Billboard Hot 100, reaching number 34. It reached the top ten on the R&B Songs chart and the top 20 on the Hot R&B/Hip-Hop Songs chart. The song also charted and peaked at number 20 on the Canadian Hot 100.

== Charts ==
=== Weekly charts ===
Chart (2016–2017)	Peak position
Canada Hot 100 (Billboard)	20
Czech Republic Singles Digital (ČNS IFPI)	27
Germany (GfK)	98
Ireland (IRMA)	67
Netherlands (Single Top 100)	63
Portugal (AFP)	44
Sweden (Sverigetopplistan)	65
UK Singles (OCC)	43
UK Hip Hop/R&B (OCC)	9
US Billboard Hot 100	34
US Hot R&B/Hip-Hop Songs (Billboard)	15

=== Year-end charts ===
Chart (2017)	Position
US Hot R&B Songs (Billboard)	41

== Certifications ==
Region	Certification	Certified units/sales
Canada (Music Canada)	Gold	40,000^{‡}
Denmark (IFPI Danmark)	Gold	45,000^{‡}
New Zealand (RMNZ)	Gold	15,000^{‡}
United Kingdom (BPI)	Silver	200,000^{‡}
United States (RIAA)	Platinum	1,000,000^{‡}
^{‡} Sales+streaming figures based on certification alone.
