= Maintain (song) =

2018 single by Belly featuring Nav

Single by Belly featuring Nav

from the album Immigrant
- Released: 6 April 2018
- Recorded: 2018
- Genre: Hip hop
- Length: 3:29
- Label: Roc Nation; XO
- Songwriter(s): Ahmad Balshe; Navraj Goraya; Guerby Francois; Austin Powerz; Shakari Boles
- Producer(s): Austin Powerz; TrakGirl

Belly singles chronology
"4 Days" (2018)	"Maintain" (2018)	"What You Want" (2018)

Nav singles chronology
"Freshman List" (2018)	"Maintain" (2018)	"Action" (2018)

Music video
- "Maintain" on YouTube

Maintain is a song by Palestinian-Canadian rapper Belly, featuring vocals from fellow Canadian rapper and labelmate Nav. It was released on 6 April 2018 for streaming and digital download by Roc Nation and XO. The song was written by the two artists, and its producers, Austin Powerz and Trakgirl.

== Background ==
"Maintain" is the lead single off the Immigrant album. It features guest vocals from Canadian rapper, and fellow XO labelmate, Nav. This would be their third collaboration, following "Re Up" (Belly, 2016), and "You Know" (Nav and Metro Boomin, 2017). The official music video for the song was released on 11 May 2018.

== Music video ==
The music video was directed by Shomi Patwary. As of June 2019, the music video has clocked in over 3 million views on YouTube.

== Charts ==
Chart (2018)	Peak position
Canada (Canadian Hot 100)	97

== Certifications ==
Region	Certification	Certified units/sales
Canada (Music Canada)	Gold	40,000^{‡}
^{‡} Sales+streaming figures based on certification alone.

== Release history ==
Region	Date	Format	Label(s)	Ref.
United States	6 April 2018	Digital download	XO; Roc Nation	
