= Poison (Aaliyah song) =

2021 single by Aaliyah featuring The Weeknd

Single by Aaliyah featuring the Weeknd

from the album Unstoppable
- Released: December 17, 2021
- Recorded: 2001 (Aaliyah's vocals); 2021 (The Weeknd's vocals)
- Genre: R&B
- Length: 2:42
- Label: Blackground 2.0
- Songwriters: Abel Tesfaye; Ahmad Balshe; Stephen Garrett
- Producers: DannyBoyStyles; Nick Lamb; Mike Dean

Aaliyah singles chronology
"Don't Think They Know" (2013)	"Poison" (2021)	"Gone" (2025)

The Weeknd singles chronology
"Tears in the Club" (2021)	"Poison" (2021)	"Sacrifice" (2022)

Visualizer video
- "Poison" on YouTube

"Poison" is a song by American singer Aaliyah featuring Canadian singer the Weeknd. It was released on December 17, 2021, through Blackground Records 2.0, as the lead single from Aaliyah's upcoming posthumous album, Unstoppable. The Weeknd has writing credits alongside Belly and Static Major. Production was handled by DannyBoyStyles and Nick Lamb with engineer Mike Dean.

== Background ==
In August 2021, it was reported that Aaliyah's recorded work for Blackground (since rebranded as Blackground Records 2.0) would be re-released on physical, digital, and (for the first time ever) streaming services in a deal between the label and Empire Distribution, beginning with One in a Million on August 20, 2021. On August 25, 2021, Aaliyah's uncle and head of Blackground Records 2.0, Barry Hankerson, revealed in an interview with Big Tigger for WVEE that the album Unstoppable, would be released in "a matter of weeks". The album will feature Drake, Snoop Dogg, Ne-Yo, Chris Brown, Future and use previously unreleased vocals from before Aaliyah's passing. Hankerson shared that this will be the end of new music for the late star and added, "I think it's wonderful. It's a very emotional process to do. It's very difficult to hear her sing when she's not here, but we got through it."

On "Poison", Aaliyah's vocals had been demoed in 2001, shortly before the singer's untimely death. Hankerson issued a statement, "Thank you to all of her many fans for keeping [Aaliyah's] music alive. I'm sorry it took so long, but when you lose a family member so unexpectedly, it takes time to deal with that type of grief. I decided to release Aaliyah's music in order to keep her legacy alive."

== Critical reception ==
Upon release, the single attracted backlash due to the poor quality of Aaliyah's vocals in comparison to the crisp quality of the Weeknd's vocals. Fans of Aaliyah dismissed the song as "disrespectful". Less than twenty four hours after its release, Mike Dean, who mixed and mastered the track, released an updated version on all digital outlets. Michael Arceneaux for BET wrote that the new version "was not enough to distract from the reality of the poor quality of the source material they worked with." Writing for the same publication, Moises Mendez II wrote that the mixing of Aaliyah's vocals on the song rendered her "almost unrecognizable".

D-Money for Soul Bounce wrote, "there's something a bit off about the song. In particular, Aaliyah's vocals, which are poorly mixed and sound filtered through an old computer." Jon Blistein, writing for Rolling Stone, called the single "tender" and "atmospheric". Michael Arceneaux for BET wrote that the song "wasn't especially remarkable" and "nothing close to the quality of Aaliyah's catalog". He also wrote that "it would be generous to say the song garnered a mixed reaction because, for the most part, fans were mainly befuddled by the poor quality of the track itself."

== Chart performance ==
One week after the single's release, it debuted at number 33 on the New Zealand Hot Singles Chart.

In the US, "Poison" peaked at number 21 on the Billboard Adult R&B Airplay Chart and spent twelve weeks on that chart. It also debuted on the Billboard R&B Digital Song Sales at number 14 and the Hot R&B Songs chart at number 15.

== Charts ==
Chart performance for "Poison"
Chart (2021–2022)	Peak position
New Zealand Hot Singles (RMNZ)	33
South Africa Radio (RISA)	80
US Adult R&B Songs (Billboard)	21
US Hot R&B Songs (Billboard)	15

== Release history ==
Release history and formats for "Poison"
Region	Date	Format	Label	Ref
Various	December 17, 2021	Digital download; streaming	Blackground Records 2.0; Empire	
