= 4/4 (EP series) =

2016 EP by Meek Mill

EP by Meek Mill
- Released: January 16, 2016; January 30, 2016 (Part 2)
- Recorded: 2015–2016
- Genre: Hip-hop
- Length: 28:49
- Labels: Dream Chasers Records; Maybach Music Group
- Producers: Ben Billions; C-Sick; ChopSquad DJ; DannyBoyStyles; J.Oliver; Jahlil Beats; Mando Fresh; The Beat Bully; Southside

Meek Mill chronology
Dreams Worth More Than Money (2015)	4/4 (2016)	DC4 (2016)

4/4 Part 2

4/4 and 4/4 Part 2 are the respective first and second extended plays by American hip-hop artist Meek Mill. They were released by Dream Chasers Records and Maybach Music Group digitally for free download and stream on My Mixtapez January 16 and January 30, 2016, respectively. Both 4/4 and its second counterpart feature production by C-Sick, Jahlil Beats, The Beat Bully, Ben Billions, ChopSquad DJ, Mando Fresh, Southside, DannyBoyStyles and J.Oliver with the latter featuring guest appearances from Dave East, Future, Omelly and Tdot Illdude. The second installment of the 4/4 extended play project, was released fifteen minutes shortly after Mill's rival, Drake, released a diss track aimed towards him, "Summer Sixteen"; the EP, itself, includes a response track called "War Pain". Mill later revealed that Drake's alleged ghostwriter, Quentin Miller, sent him the lyrics to "Summer Sixteen" before it was released, which influenced Meek's response in "War Pain".

The 4/4 extended play project was also used as a template to help promote Meek Mill's mixtape, DC4, the fourth installment to the Dreamchasers mixtape series, which was later released on October 28, 2016.

== Track listing ==
4/4
No.	Title	Producer(s)	Length
1.	"Pray For 'Em"	C-Sick	3:38
2.	"I'm the Plug (Freestyle)"	Southside	1:43
3.	"Gave 'Em Hope"	J.Oliver	3:31
4.	"FBH"	Jahlil Beats	2:51

4/4 Part 2
No.	Title	Producer(s)	Length
1.	"Fa' Sho" (featuring Tdot Illdude)	Mando Fresh	4:36
2.	"Ricky"	ChopSquad DJ	4:04
3.	"Slippin'" (featuring Dave East and Future)	The Beat Bully	3:29
4.	"War Pain" (featuring Omelly)	Ben Billions; DannyBoyStyles	4:57

Sample credits

- "Pray For 'Em" contains a sample of the song Planet Hell by Nightwish.
- "I'm The Plug (Freestyle)" contains a sample of the songs Jumpman and I'm the Plug by Drake and Future.
- "Slippin'" contains a sample of the song Slippin' by DMX.
