= Immigrant (album) =

Studio album by Belly
- Released: 12 October 2018
- Recorded: 2017–2018
- Length: 32:28
- Label: Roc Nation; XO
- Producer: Austin Powerz; Ben Billions; Bijan Amir; Cirkut; DaHeala; Doc McKinney; ELew; Guerby Francois; Illangelo; Krystyana; Chelminski; Metro Boomin; Nav; Nick The Piff; Rex Kudo; Sam Hamad; Skinny; Southside; The ANMLS; TrakGirl

Belly chronology
Mumble Rap (2017)	Immigrant (2018)	See You Next Wednesday (2021)

Singles from Immigrant
- 1. "Maintain" Released: 6 April 2018; 2. "What You Want" Released: 24 May 2018

Immigrant is the second studio album by Palestinian-Canadian rapper Belly. It was released through Roc Nation and XO Records on 12 October 2018. The album features guest appearances from Zack, Meek Mill, M.I.A., Yo Gotti, Metro Boomin, French Montana, the Weeknd, and Nav. Production was handled by Metro Boomin and Nav themselves, alongside Ben Billions, Skinny, DaHeala, Southside, Cirkut, and ELew, among others.

== Background ==
The album was teased numerous times late 2017, with the album title then being "Midnight Zone". Belly also shared in studio images of himself working alongside American rapper Jay-Z, which speculated the two working on a song together. Following the release of "Maintain", featuring Canadian rapper and fellow labelmate Nav, Belly was attacked by security guards at the Coachella event, during the Weeknd's headlining set. Belly responded with a number of tweets; "20 of you pussies couldn’t take me off my feet" and "no negative bullshit can steal my joy.. I performed the best show of my life, on 4/20 at Coachella ‼️I really came from nothing, and I’m still here.. it’s gotta mean something." The album was officially announced on social media on 2 September 2018, with a new album title and an official release date, where he stated the following; "With everything going on, I can’t sit by and say nothing. I decided to speak my truths. my album is now called || IMMIGRANT || out on October 12 || xotwod || RN"

== Singles ==
The lead single of the album, "Maintain", which features Canadian rapper and fellow labelmate Nav, was released on 6 April 2018. The second single, "What You Want", which features Canadian singer and fellow label boss, the Weeknd, was released on 24 May 2018.

== Commercial performance ==
Immigrant debuted at 169 on the US Billboard 200 chart and at 31 on the Canadian Albums Chart.

== Track listing ==
No.	Title	Writer(s)	Producer(s)	Length
1.	"Another Note" (featuring Zack)	Ahmad Balshe; Zakaria Kharbouch; Benjamin Diehl	Ben Billions	2:30
2.	"Xion"	Balshe; Sami Hamed; Richard Muñoz; Faris Al-Majed; Bijan Amirkhani	Skinny; The ANMLS; Bijan Amir	2:14
3.	"Who Hurt You"	Balshe; Abel Tesfaye; Aubrey Graham; Carlo Montagnese; Martin McKinney; Jason Quenneville; Muñoz; Al-Majed; Krystyana Cleminski; Nicholas Varvatsoulis	DaHeala; The ANMLS	2:43
4.	"Immigrant" (featuring Meek Mill and M.I.A.)	Balshe; Robert Williams; Maya Arulpragasam; Muñoz; Al-Majed; Leon Thomas; Masamune Kudo	The ANMLS; Thomas; Rex Kudo	3:52
5.	"Numbers" (featuring Yo Gotti)	Balshe; Mario Mims; Guerby Francois; Hamed; Muñoz; Al-Majed	Skinny; The ANMLS	2:51
6.	"All for Me" (featuring Metro Boomin)	Balshe; Leland Wayne; Joshua Luellen	Metro Boomin; Southside	2:02
7.	"Dust" (featuring French Montana)	Balshe; Karim Kharbouch; Christian Arroyo; Nicholas Danton; Muñoz; Al-Majed	The ANMLS	2:40
8.	"What You Want" (featuring The Weeknd)	Balshe; Tesfaye; Muñoz; Al-Majed; Navraj Goraya; Henry Walter	The ANMLS; Nav; Cirkut^{[a]}	3:15
9.	"What Does It Mean?"	Balshe; Eric Lewis; Hamed; Muñoz; Al-Majed; Varvatsoulis	ELew; Skinny; The ANMLS	3:36
10.	"Maintain" (featuring Nav)	Balshe; Goraya; Francois; Austin Schindler; Shakari Boles	Austin Powerz; TrakGirl	3:29
11.	"Street Cathedral"	Balshe; Hamed; Muñoz; Al-Majed	Skinny; The ANMLS	3:20
Total length:				32:28

Notes

- ^{^[a]} signifies a co-producer.

Sample credits

- "Who Hurt You" samples "The Zone", performed by the Weeknd featuring Drake.

== Personnel ==
Credits adapted from the album's liner notes and Tidal.

=== Musicians ===
- Belly – primary artist (all tracks)
- Zack – featured artist (track 1)
- Meek Mill – featured artist (track 4)
- M.I.A. – featured artist (track 4)
- Yo Gotti – featured artist (track 5)
- Metro Boomin – featured artist (track 6)
- French Montana – featured artist (track 7)
- The Weeknd – featured artist (track 8)
- Nav – featured artist (track 10)

=== Technical ===
- Jaycen Joshua – mixing (all tracks), studio personnel (all tracks)
- Chris Athens – mastering (all tracks), studio personnel (all tracks)
- Faris Al-Majed – recording (all tracks), studio personnel (all tracks), programming (tracks 2–5, 7–9), engineering (track 8)
- Jacob Richards – assistant mixing (tracks 1, 4, 8), studio personnel (tracks 1, 4, 8)
- Mike Seaberg – assistant mixing (tracks 1, 4), studio personnel (tracks 1, 4)
- Rashawn Mclean – assistant mixing (tracks 1, 4), studio personnel (tracks 1, 4)
- Ben Billions – programming (track 1)
- Baruch "Mixx" Nembhard – mixing (track 2), engineering (track 10), studio personnel (tracks 2, 10)
- David Nakaji – assistant mixing (tracks 2, 3, 5–11), studio personnel (tracks 2, 3, 5–11)
- Iván Jiménez – assistant mixing (tracks 2, 3, 5–7, 11), studio personnel (tracks 2, 3, 5–7, 11)
- Richard Muñoz – programming (tracks 2–5, 7–9)
- DaHeala – programming (track 3)
- Rex Kudo – programming (track 4)
- Anthony Cruz – recording (track 4), studio personnel (track 4)
- Metro Boomin – programming (track 6)
- Southside – programming (track 6)
- Shin Kamiyama – engineering (track 8), studio personnel (track 8)
- Nav – programming (track 8)
- DannyBoyStyles – recording (track 8), studio personnel (track 8)
- Austin Powerz – programming (track 10)
- TrakGirl – programming (track 10)

== Charts ==
Chart (2018)	Peak position
Canadian Albums (Billboard)	31
US Billboard 200	169
