= White Friday (CM9) =

Mixtape by Yo Gotti
- Released: December 23, 2016
- Recorded: 2016
- Studio: CM9 House; No Name Studios (Los Angeles, CA); Patchwerk Studios (Atlanta, GA); Jungle City Studios (New York, NY); Hit Factory Studios (Miami, FL)
- Genre: Hip hop
- Length: 41:31
- Label: CMG; Epic
- Producer: Ben Billions; Chopsquad DJ; DJ Infamous; Marvel Hitz; K Swisha; Reef; Schife Karbeen; Southside; StreetRunner; Tarik Azzouz

Yo Gotti chronology
2 Federal (2016)	White Friday (CM9) (2016)	Gotti Made-It (2017)

Professional ratings
Review scores
Source	Rating
AllMusic	3/5 stars
Pitchfork	6.8/10

White Friday (CM9) is the twentieth and first retail mixtape by American rapper Yo Gotti. It released on December 23, 2016, via Cocaine Muzik Group and Epic Records. Recording sessions took place at CM9 House, No Name Studios in Los Angeles, PatchWerk Recording Studios in Atlanta, Jungle City Studios in New York and Hit Factory Studios in Miami.

Production was handled by Ben Billions, K Swisha, Chopsquad DJ, DJ Infamous, Marvel Hitz, Rob "Reef" Tewlow, Schife Karbeen, Southside, StreetRunner and Tarik Azzouz. It features guest appearances from 2 Chainz, Big Sean, Blac Youngsta, Kanye West, Kodak Black, LunchMoney Lewis, Quavo, YFN Lucci and DJ Khaled.

The mixtape debuted at number 16 on the Billboard 200, number 4 on the Top R&B/Hip-Hop Albums and number 3 on the Top Rap Albums in the United States.

It was supported by music videos for the songs "Weatherman", "81" and "Lifestyle". The song "Castro" reached number 16 on the US Bubbling Under Hot 100.

== Track listing ==
No.	Title	Writer(s)	Producer(s)	Length
1.	"81"	Mario Mims; Brandon Michael Henshaw	Marvel Hitz	3:28
2.	"Power of Money"	Mims; Atia Boggs; Nicholas Warwar; Tarik Azzouz; Danny Flores	StreetRunner; Tarik Azzouz	3:44
3.	"Lifestyle" (featuring LunchMoney Lewis)	Mims; Gamal Lewis; Ben Diehl	Ben Billions; Schife Karbeen	3:10
4.	"Weatherman" (featuring Kodak Black)	Mims; Dieuson Octave; Diehl	Ben Billions	3:26
5.	"Blah Blah Blah"	Mims; Karl Hamnqvist; Lionel Nealy	K Swisha	3:13
6.	"They Like" (featuring YFN Lucci)	Mims; Rayshawn Lamar Bennett; Darrell Jackson	Chopsquad DJ	3:00
7.	"I Remember" (featuring DJ Khaled)	Mims; Khaled Khaled; Rob Tewlow; Angelo Bond; Greg Perry	Reef	4:33
8.	"Castro" (featuring Kanye West, Big Sean, Quavo and 2 Chainz)	Mims; Kanye West; Sean Anderson; Quavious Marshall; Tauheed Epps; Diehl	Ben Billions	3:39
9.	"Free Lunch" (featuring Blac Youngsta)	Mims; Hamnqvist; Nealy	K Swisha	2:45
10.	"Off da Top (3AM)"	Mims; Joshua Howard Luellen	Southside	2:41
11.	"What Happened"	Mims; Eddie Tate; Diehl; Marco Antonio Rodriguez-Diaz Jr.	Ben Billions; DJ Infamous	7:52
Total length:				41:31

Sample credits

- Track 7 contains a sample from "Come On Down (Get Your Head Out Of The Clouds)" written by Angelo Bond and Greg Perry as performed by Greg Perry.

== Personnel ==
- Mario "Yo Gotti" Mims — vocals, executive producer
- Atia "Ink" Boggs — additional vocals (track 2)
- Gamal "LunchMoney" Lewis — vocals (track 3)
- Dieuson "Kodak Black" Octave — vocals (track 4)
- Rayshawn "YFN Lucci" Bennett — vocals (track 6)
- Khaled Mohammed Khaled — vocals (track 7)
- Kanye West — vocals (track 8)
- "Big Sean" Anderson — vocals (track 8)
- Quavious "Quavo" Marshall — vocals (track 8)
- Tauheed "2 Chainz" Epps — vocals (track 8)
- Samuel "Blac Youngsta" Benson — vocals (track 9)
- Eddie Tate — additional vocals (track 11)
- Keith Cooper — saxophone (track 11)
- Brandon "Youngstarr" Henshaw — producer (track 1)
- Nicholas "Streetrunner" Warwar — producer (track 2)
- Tarik Azzouz — producer (track 2)
- Benjamin "Ben Billions" Diehl — producer (tracks: 3, 4, 8, 11)
- Schife Karbeen — producer (track 3)
- Karl Hamnqvist — producer (tracks: 5, 9)
- Lionel Nealy — producer (tracks: 5, 9)
- Darrel "Chopsquad DJ" Jackson — producer (track 6)
- Rob "Reef" Tewlow — producer (track 7)
- Joshua "Southside" Luellen — producer (track 10)
- Marco "DJ Infamous" Rodriguez-Diaz — producer (track 11)
- Leo Goff — recording (tracks: 1–6, 8–11), mixing (tracks: 7–11)
- Kyle Resto — recording (track 7)
- Jaycen Joshua — mixing (tracks: 1–4, 6)
- Manny Marroquin — mixing (track 5)
- Ryan Kaul — engineering assistant (tracks: 1–4, 6)
- Maddox Chhim — engineering assistant (tracks: 1–4, 6)
- Chris Galland — engineering assistant (track 5)
- Jeff Jackson — engineering assistant (track 5)
- Robin Florent — engineering assistant (track 5)
- Andrew Westmoreland — engineering assistant (track 9)
- Matthew Weiss — engineering assistant (track 10)
- Chris Athens — mastering
- Dave Huffman — mastering
- Chris Feldmann — art direction, design
- Steven Wilson — illustration
- Timothy Saccenti — photography
- Jermaine Pegues — A&R
- Salomon Naar — A&R
- Damien Aubrey — A&R
- Dalia Glickman — A&R
- Mel Carter — management

== Charts ==
Chart (2017)	Peak position
US Billboard 200	16
US Top R&B/Hip-Hop Albums (Billboard)	4
US Top Rap Albums (Billboard)	3
