= Infamous (producer) =

American record producer

- Also known as: Infamous; DJ Infamous
- Born: Marco Antonio Rodriguez-Diaz, Jr. June 19, 1980 (age 46); Miami, Florida
- Genres: Hip hop; R&B; pop; turntablism; rock
- Occupations: Record producer; songwriter; disc jockey
- Instruments: Guitar; bass; drums; piano; synthesizers; turntables
- Years active: 1997–present
- Formerly of: The-Allies DJ Crew; Antenna

Marco Rodriguez-Diaz Jr., professionally known as Infamous or DJ Infamous, is a Grammy Award-winning American record producer, songwriter, multi-instrumentalist, and three-time world champion DJ. He is best known for his long-standing collaboration with Lil Wayne, and as a co-writer and co-producer of the Billboard #1 hit “Lose Control” by Teddy Swims.

Infamous first gained international recognition in the late 1990s and early 2000s as a battle DJ and founding member of the legendary DJ crew The-Allies, alongside DJ Craze, A-Trak, DVLP, Spectacular, and J-Smoke. His final competition appearance was in 2001 in London England, where he won the DMC World Team Championship alongside DJ Craze, Prime Cuts, and Tony Vegas.

After retiring from the competitive DJ circuit, Infamous returned to his roots as a guitarist and founded the alt-rock band Antenna, where he honed his skills as a songwriter and producer. Though the band attracted interest from major labels, it disbanded before releasing its debut album.

In 2006, Infamous began working closely with Lil Wayne, producing multiple tracks on the Grammy-winning album Tha Carter III, including the standout collaboration “Mr. Carter” feat. Jay-Z. The track earned a Grammy nomination for Best Rap Performance by a Duo or Group, while the album itself was nominated for Album of the Year and won Best Rap Album.

Infamous continued his work with Wayne throughout the years becoming one of his most frequent collaborators. He produced six tracks on Rebirth, including the lead single “Prom Queen”, which peaked at #15 on the Billboard Hot 100. The title track for the album series I Am Not A Human Being. Multiple tracks on Tha Carter IV and FWA and in 2018, he produced “Mona Lisa” feat. Kendrick Lamar for Tha Carter V, which debuted at #2 on the Hot 100, and topped multiple Billboard charts including Rap Songs, R&B/Rap Songs, Rap Digital Downloads, and Rap Streaming Songs.

In 2024, Infamous co-wrote and produced “Lose Control” by Teddy Swims, which became a global smash, reaching #1 on the Billboard Hot 100, and breaking the record for longest running top ten in Hot 100 history as well as holding the record for most weeks spent on The Hot 100. “Lose Control” currently stands as the 7th biggest hit in Hot 100 history.

== DJ Titles ==
- 1998 ITF USA DJ Champion
- 1998 ITF World DJ Champion (2nd)
- 1999 ITF Western Hemisphere Team Champion
- 1999 ITF World Team DJ Champion
- 1999 DMC USA Team DJ Champion
- 1999 DMC World DJ Team (2nd)
- 2000 ITF Western Hemisphere Beatjuggling Champion
- 2000 ITF World Beatjuggling Champion
- 2000 ITF World Advancement (3rd)
- 2000 DMC USA Team Champion
- 2001 Vestax Extravaganza (3rd)
- 2001 DMC USA (3rd)
- 2001 DMC World Team Champion (Perverted Allies)

== Releases ==
Midget Madness (2002)

== Business endeavors ==
- Tablist Magazine (Founder)
- Allstar Beatdown (Founder)
- Ammo Records (Co-Founder with Develop)

== Production discography ==
=== Lil Wayne - Light Up My La La (2007) ===
- 00. "Light Up My La La"

=== Lil Wayne - The Leak (2007) ===
- 05. "Talkin Bout It" (produced with Develop)

=== Lil Wayne - Tha Carter III (2008) ===
- 02. "Mr. Carter" (featuring Jay-Z) (produced with Drew Correa)
- 14. "Playin With Fire" (featuring Betty Wright) (Guitars and keyboards by Infamous)

=== Fat Joe - The Elephant in the Room (2008) ===
- 01. "The Fugitive"

=== LL Cool J - Exit 13 (2008) ===
- 19. "Dear Hip Hop" (string arrangement by Infamous)

=== Ace Hood - Gutta (2008) ===
- 13. "Top of the World"

=== Plies - Da Realist (2008) ===
- 06. "Family Straight"

=== Jah Cure - The Universal Cure (2009) ===
- 06. "Universal Cure"

=== Capone-n-Noreaga - Channel 10 (2009) ===
- 11. "Beef" {Keys by Infamous)

=== Lil Wayne - Kobe Bryant (2009) ===
- 00. "Kobe Bryant"

=== Fat Joe - J.O.S.E. 2 (2009) ===
- 02. "Hey Joe"
- 12. "Music"

=== Birdman - Priceless (2009) ===
- 06. "Bring It Back" (feat. Lil Wayne)
- 18. "Southside (Remix)" (feat. Lil Wayne, Rick Ross and Mack Maine)

=== Young Money Entertainment - We Are Young Money (2009) ===
- 15. "Finale" (T-Streets, Gudda Gudda, Jae Millz, Tyga, Lil Chuckee, Lil Twist, Nicki Minaj, Shanell, Mack Maine, Drake and Lil Wayne) (produced with Onhel)

=== Lil Wayne - Rebirth (2010) ===
- 02. "Prom Queen" (feat. Shanell)
- 03. "Ground Zero"
- 10. "One Way Trip" (feat. Kevin Rudolf)
- 12. "The Price is Wrong"
- 14. "I'm So Over You" (feat. Shanell)

=== Fat Joe - The Darkside Vol. 1 (2010) ===
- 05. "Rappers are in Danger"
- 04. "Kilos" (feat. Camron and Clipse)

=== Drake - I'm on My Way (2010) ===
- 00. "I'm on My Way" (produced with Noah "40" Shebib)

=== Rick Ross - The Albert Anastasia EP (2010) ===
- 01. "Diddy Speaks" (feat. Diddy)

=== Travis McCoy - Lazarus (2010) ===
- 06. "Akidagain"

=== Lil Wayne - I Am Not a Human Being (2010) ===
- 04. "I Am Not a Human Being"

=== Kid Sister - Fool's Gold Records Vol. 1 (2010) ===
- 06. "Don't Stop Movin"

=== Nelly - 5.0 (2010) ===
- 01. "I'm Number One" (feat. Birdman & DJ Khaled)
- 16. "Giving her the Grind" (feat. Sean Paul and City Spud)

=== Swizz Beatz - Monster Mondays Volume One (2011) ===
- 07. "Hot Steppa #1" (feat. Eve)

=== Kool G Rap - Riches, Royalty, Respect (2011) ===
- 15. "Harmony Homicide"

=== Lil Wayne - Tha Carter IV (2011) ===
- 14. "President Carter"

=== The Game - California Republic (2012) ===
- 14. "Skate On" (feat. Lupe Fiasco)

=== Lupe Fiasco - Food & Liquor II: The Great American Rap Album Pt. 1 (2012) ===
- 13. "Form Follows Function"

=== Meek Mill - Dreams and Nightmares (2012) ===
- 06. "Maybach Curtains" (feat. Nas, Rick Ross and John Legend)

=== Yo Gotti - Nov 19th: The Mixtape (2013) ===
- 04. "Fuck You" (feat. Meek Mill)

=== Wrekonize - The War Within (2013) ===
- 12. "Modern Man"

=== ¡Mayday! - Believers (2013) ===
- 05. "High Ride"
- 07. "My Life"
- 09. "Tear Shit Down"
- 12. "Marathon Man"

=== Yo Gotti - I Am (2013) ===
- 02. "Dont Come Around" (feat. Kendall Morgan)
- 05. "F-U" (feat. Meek Mill)

=== Lil Wayne - Krazy (2014) ===
- 00. "Krazy"

=== Vince Staples - Hell Can Wait (2014) ===
- 02. "65Hunnid"

=== Yo Gotti - Concealed (2014) ===
- 11. "11/11"

=== Viv & The Revival - The Introduction (2015) ===
- 05. "Flash"

=== Lil Wayne - FWA (2015) ===
- 01. "Glory" (produced with Avenue Beatz & Onhel)
- 03. "I Feel Good" (produced with T@)
- 07. "Psycho" (feat. Leah Hayes)
- 09. "Thinking Bout You" (produced with T@)
- 13. "Living Right" (feat. Wiz Khalifa) (produced with T@)
- 14. "White Girl" (feat. Young Jeezy)

=== Yo Gotti - CM8 (2015) ===
- 05. "Long Way" (feat. Big Sean)

=== Yo Gotti - The Return (2015) ===
- 05. "Real Nigga Holiday" (produced with Ben Billions)

=== Black Violin - Stereotypes (2015) ===
- 01. "Stereotypes"
- 05. "Shaker"
- 12. "Runnin"

=== Lil Wayne - Pour Up (2015) ===
- 00. "Pour Up"

=== Belly - Up For Days (2015) ===
- 10. "Who am I" (produced with Ben Billions)

=== Lil Dicky - Professional Rapper (2015) ===
- 11. "Oh Well" (additional keys)

=== Yo Gotti - Again (Single) (2016) ===
- 01. "Again" (feat. LunchMoneyLewis) (produced with Ben Billions and JMIKE)

=== Charlie Puth - Nine Track Mind (2016) ===
- 02. "Dangerously"

=== Yo Gotti - The Art of Hustle (2016) ===
- 05. "General" (feat. Future) (produced with Ben Billions)

=== 2 Chainz - ColleGrove (2016) ===
- 03. "Bounce" (feat. Lil Wayne) (produced with T@)

=== Belly - Inzombia (2016) ===
- 03. "Trap Phone" (feat. Jadakiss)
- 09. "Seven Day Love" (feat. Ashanti) (produced with Ben Billions and Belly)

=== Yo Gotti - CM9 (2016) ===
- 12. "What Happened" (produced with Ben Billions)

=== Belly - Another Day in Paradise (2016) ===
- 01. "It's all Love" (feat. Starrah)

=== G-Eazy - Fast and Furious 8 (2017) ===
- 03. "Good Life" (feat. Kehlani) (produced with DJ Frank E, Ben Billions, Evigan and Danny Majic)

=== Yo Gotti - Top Down (2017) ===
- 00. "Top Down"(feat. Meek Mill) (produced with Ben Billions)

=== Kevin Gates - What If (2017) ===
- 00. "What If" (produced with Ben Billions)

=== Kodak Black - Project Baby 2 (2017) ===
- 01. "Codeine Dreamin" (feat. Lil Wayne) (produced with Ben Billions and Schife Karbeen)

=== Lil Wayne - Dedication 6 Reloaded (2018) ===
- 01. "For Nothing"

=== Kodak Black - Heart Break Kodak (2018) ===
- 05. "Codeine Dreamin" (feat. Lil Wayne) (produced with Ben Billions and Schife Karbeen)
- 09. "I Get Lonely"

=== Kid Cudi - Rampage (2018) ===
- 00. "The Rage" (feat. Smashing Pumpkins) (produced with Ben Billions and Dot Da Genius)

=== Lil Wayne - Tha Carter V (2018) ===
- 08. "Mona Lisa" (feat. Kendrick Lamar)
- 10. "Open Letter"
- 15. "Took His Time"
- 19. "Mess"
- 22. "Used 2"

=== Lil Wayne & Ty Dolla $ign - Spider-Man: Into the Spider-Verse (2018) ===
- 08. "Scared of the Dark" (feat. XXXTENTACION)

=== Lil Wayne & Ty Dolla $ign - Spider-Man: Into the Spider-Verse (2019) ===
- 00. "Scared of the Dark" Remix (feat. XXXTENTACION & Ozuna)

=== Plan B - First Past The Post (2019) ===
- 00. "First Past The Post”

=== Lil Wayne - Funeral (2020) ===
- 06. "Stop Playin with me"

=== Lil Wayne - Tha Carter V Deluxe (2020) ===
- 03. "More To The Story" Ft. Raekwon

=== Lil Wayne - No Ceilings (2020) ===
- 06. "Kobe Bryant"

=== Gashi - Butterflies (2020) ===
- 02. "Madness"

=== Lunchmoney Lewis - Oceans (2021) ===
- 00. "Oceans” ft. Meghan Trainor

=== Belly - See You Next Wednesday (2021) ===
- 05. "Moment of silence"

=== Rick Ross - Richer Than I ever Been (2021) ===
- 09. "Outlawz" ft. Jazmine Sullivan and 21 savage

=== Teddy Swims - I’ve tried everything but therapy (2023) ===
- 02. "Lose control”

=== Diddy - Off the Grid (2023) ===
- 23. "Space” ft. H.E.R.

=== Jit4 Stan - A Different Jit (2024) ===
- 01. "A different Jit”

=== Lil Wayne - Tha Carter VI (2025) ===
- 04. "Hip-Hop” (with BigXthaPlug featuring Jay Jones)

=== Saweetie - Hella Pressure (2025) ===
- 03. "Twinzzz”

=== Pluto - Pluto world (2025) ===
- 07. "Pluto Walk”

== Film scores ==
Magic City Memoirs (2011) Heat Nation (2014)
