= Wassim Slaiby =

Canadian music industry executive and CEO of XO Records

- وسيم صليبي
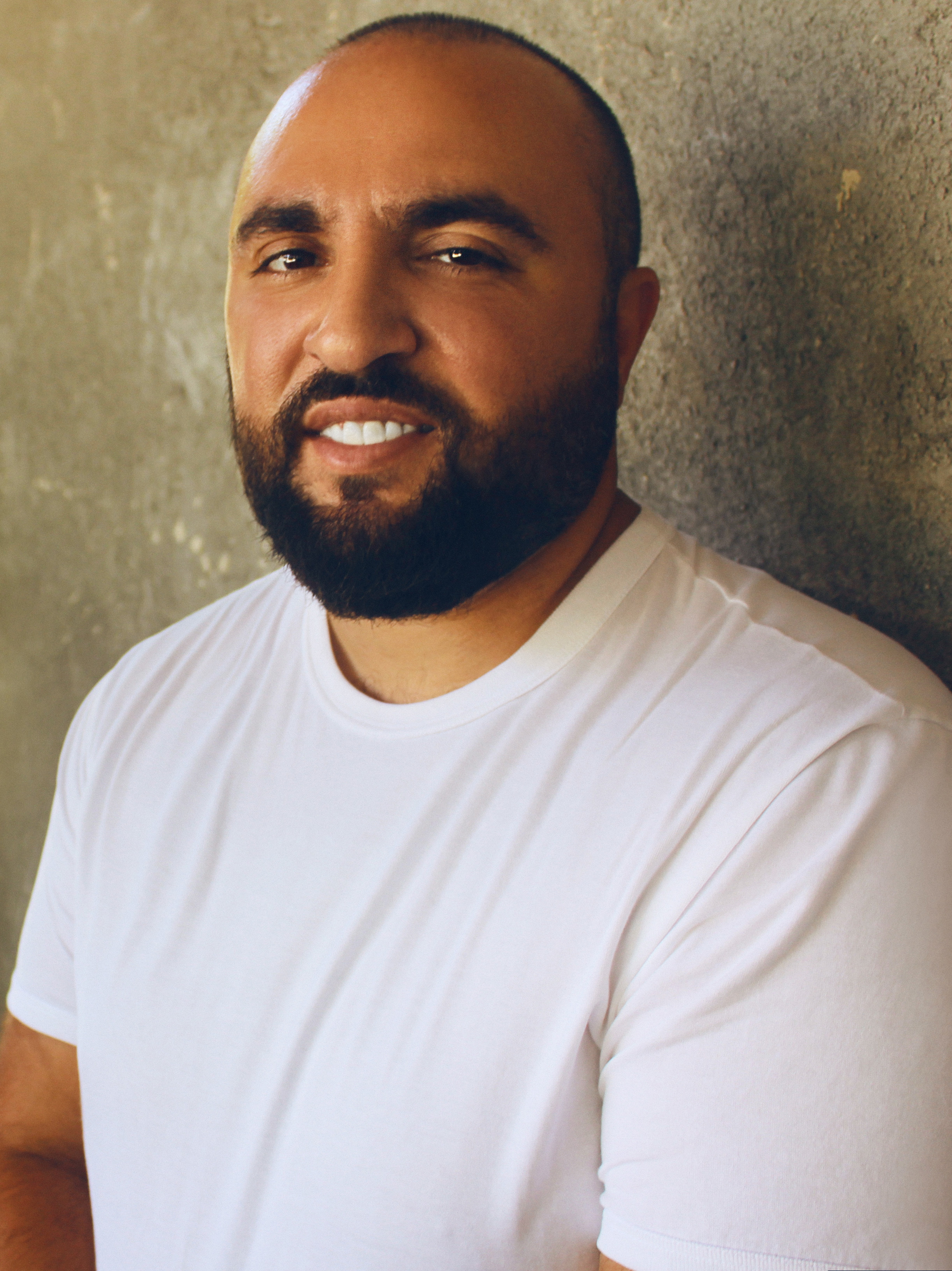
- Slaiby in 2018
- Born: Wassim Joseph Slaiby; November 16, 1979 (age 46); Ghazir, Lebanon
- Other names: Sal; Tony Sal
- Occupations: Record executive; talent manager; entrepreneur; philanthropist
- Years active: 2002–present
- Employers: XO; SALXCO; Universal Arabic Music; Capital Prophets Music Group
- Known for: Manager of the Weeknd, Doja Cat, Nicki Minaj, French Montana, Bebe Rexha, Ty Dolla Sign, Belly, Nav, Sabrina Claudio, Brandy, Ali Gatie, DaHeala, DannyBoyStyles, Breyan Isaac, Ben Billions, Rob Knox, Harry Fraud, Massari, M.I.A., Rick Ross, Metro Boomin, London on da Track, Nasri, Shenseea, Swedish House Mafia, Christine and the Queens, Fabian Marasciullo
- Title: CEO and co-founder of XO; CEO and founder of Universal Arabic Music; CEO and co-founder of Capital Prophets Music Group; Musical Director at FIFA Sound
- Board member of: Global Citizen; HXOUSE
- Spouse: Rima Fakih (m. 2016)
- Children: 4

Wassim Joseph Slaiby (Arabic: وسيم جوزيف صليبي; born November 16, 1979), also known as Sal (stylized in all caps), is a Lebanese-Canadian record executive, talent manager, entrepreneur, and philanthropist. He co-founded the record label XO with Canadian singer the Weeknd in 2011, for whom he has also managed for since. Furthermore, Slaiby is the founder and CEO of Universal Arabic Music, which he launched in 2021 in partnership with Republic Records, a division of Universal Music Group.

Slaiby first co-founded CP Music Group in 2002, and later joined the Maverick management consortium in 2016. That same year, he founded the entertainment agency SALXCO, through which he has managed artists including Doja Cat, Bebe Rexha, and Nicki Minaj, and producers and songwriters including Jason "DaHeala" Quenneville, DannyBoyStyles, and Metro Boomin. In January 2024, Bloomberg reported that SALXCO did not list Sean "Diddy" Combs as a client on its website.

== Early life ==
Wassim Joseph Slaiby was born in Ghazir, Lebanon on November 16, 1979. His father died when he was ten years old. He escaped the Lebanese Civil War and immigrated to Canada without family when he was fifteen years old. He initially lived in Montreal before moving to Ottawa in his late teens.

== Career ==
=== 2002–2011: CP Music Group ===
Slaiby began his music industry career after meeting and seeing a young fellow immigrant rapper Belly freestyle rapping on an Ottawa street in 2002. Slaiby started managing Belly, with whom he co-founded Capital Prophets Records, which would go on to be known as the CP Music Group. Slaiby also hired Amir "Cash" Esmailian, who was a close friend of Belly, as the head of street promotion for the label.

Rapper Belly and singer Massari were the first artists signed to the new record label by Slaiby. Massari's 2005 self-titled album was certified Gold in Canada and garnered a Juno Award nomination. Belly's 2007 album, The Revolution, won the Juno Award for Rap Recording of the Year. Within six years, CP Music Group had become the dominant independent hip-hop and R&B label in Canada.

=== 2011–present: XO Records, SALXCO and Universal Arabic Music ===
In 2011, Slaiby met and began co-managing the singer the Weeknd with Esmailian, and co-founded XO Records with the artist and his creative director La Mar Taylor. Through the label, the Weeknd released his first three mixtapes; House of Balloons, Thursday, and Echoes of Silence, which were produced in-house by Illangelo. In 2012, XO Records was assumed by Universal Music Group as a subsidiary label following the Weeknd signing with Republic Records. In 2013, Slaiby added DaHeala, DannyBoyStyles, Harry Fraud and Belly as in-house producers and songwriters. Slaiby became the label's CEO in 2015.

In 2011, Slaiby founded his own artist and talent management company SALXCO, and later sold the CP Music Group to Live Nation. In May 2016, he partnered with Guy Oseary's Maverick consortium. Through SALXCO, Slaiby manages the artists signed to XO Records, including singer Black Atlass and rapper Nav, and other artists and producers such as Doja Cat, Nicki Minaj, London On Da Track, Ali Gatie, Harry Fraud, Metro Boomin, Bebe Rexha and Swedish House Mafia.

On April 6, 2021, Universal Music Group and Republic Records announced the launch of the new record label Universal Arabic Music, with Slaiby as its founder and CEO.

== Other ventures ==
In December 2017, Slaiby joined the Lebanon-based music streaming service, Anghami, as the head of international partnerships. In 2018, he joined the board of HXOUSE, an incubator founded by La Mar Taylor, Belly and the Weeknd consisting of a 30,000-square-foot space facility located near Toronto's waterfront that provides studio rooms and offers equipment needed for recording, designing, and producing at a low cost for young artists. In the same year, he helped bring Shakira to the Cedars International Festival in Lebanon.

In 2019, Slaiby became an investor of the music-focused social video platform Triller. In April 2019, he was invited as a guest speaker to the Brilliant Minds, an annual conference created by Spotify founder Daniel Ek, where he was among a panel of speakers that included former US President Barack Obama, businessman Even Spiegel, and scientist Hartmut Neven.

== Philanthropy ==
In 2017, Slaiby and French Montana helped build the Suubi Hospital in Uganda in conjunction with Global Citizen and Mama Hope. In February 2018, he joined the advisory board of the international organization Global Citizen. In November 2018, he canceled his annual birthday party as a result of the deadly wildfires in California and urged his followers in an Instagram post to donate to the Los Angeles Fire Department and the California Community Foundation's Wildfire Relief Fund.

In response to the 2020 Beirut explosion, Slaiby, alongside his wife Rima Fakih, started a campaign called #GlobalAidForLebanon, in collaboration with Global Citizen and the United Nations World Food Programme. The fundraiser has raised over 2 million dollars to provide assistance to those affected.

== Personal life ==
On May 15, 2016, Slaiby married Lebanese-American model, philanthropist and Miss USA 2010 Rima Fakih in a ceremony at The Patriarchal Edifice in Bkerké, Lebanon. The wedding was attended by numerous celebrities, including The Weeknd, French Montana, Haifa Wehbe, and Wael Kfoury and was presided over by Maronite Patriarch, Bechara Boutros al-Rahi. The couple have four children together; Rima, Joseph, Amira, and Jacob. They reside in Los Angeles, California.

Slaiby is a Maronite Christian and, in 2017, was invited to visit the Pope who blessed his newborn daughter.

== Honors and recognition ==
- 2015 – 40 under 40's Top Young Power Players
- 2017 – Billboard Power 100 (no.52)
- 2018 – Billboard Power 100 (no.53)
- 2020 – Variety's Manager of the Year
- 2021 – Billboard International Power Player
