= War Pain =

Song by Meek Mill featuring Omelly

from the album 4/4 Part 2
- Released: January 30, 2016
- Recorded: 2016
- Genre: Hip hop
- Length: 4:57
- Label: Dream Chasers Records
- Songwriters: Meek Mill; Benjamin Diehl; Danny Schofield
- Producers: Ben Billions; DannyBoyStyles

"War Pain" is a song by American rapper Meek Mill featuring Omelly. The track was taken from Meek's second extended play, 4/4 Part 2. "War Pain" was produced by Ben Billions and DannyBoyStyles.

== Background ==
On January 30, 2016, Meek Mill released "War Pain" in response to Drake's "Summer Sixteen".
