= Ben Billions =

American producer, songwriter, audio engineer

- Also known as: Ben Billion$
- Born: Benjamin Dyer Diehl; Rehoboth Beach, Delaware, U.S.
- Origin: Miami, Florida, U.S.
- Education: Full Sail University (BS)
- Genres: Hip hop; R&B; pop
- Occupations: Record producer; songwriter; audio engineer
- Years active: 2007–present
- Labels: SAL&CO, Warner Chappell Music

Benjamin Dyer Diehl, known professionally as Ben Billions, is an American audio engineer, record producer and songwriter from Rehoboth Beach, Delaware. He is best known for his production and engineering work for prominent music industry artists including DJ Khaled, Lil Wayne, BigXthaPlug, Yo Gotti, and the Weeknd. His credits include the latter's hit singles "Might Not," "Often," "Low Life," "6 Inch," and "Acquainted," as well as Maroon 5's "What Lovers Do" and Yo Gotti's "Down in the DM."

Diehl attended Full Sail University to pursue audio engineering and business studies, and graduated with two degrees from the institution. While an audio intern at Miami's Circle House Studios, Diehl built a relationship with frequent studio visitor DJ Khaled and served as lead audio engineer and mixer for his second album, We the Best (2007). Since then, he has worked with Khaled on his subsequent projects while expanding further into production; he meanwhile began working severally with Khaled's collaborators including Rick Ross, Beyoncé, Kodak Black, and Nicki Minaj, among others. Khaled's songwriting often accompanies Diehl's production.

== Songwriting and production credits ==
Credits are courtesy of Discogs, Tidal, Apple Music, and AllMusic.

Title	Year	Artist	Album
"My Life" (Featuring Akon and B.o.B)	2011	DJ Khaled	We the Best Forever
"How I'm Raised"	2013	Ace Hood	Trials & Tribulations
"I Remember"	2013	Kelly Rowland	Talk a Good Game
"Paradise Lost"	2014	Rick Ross	Mastermind (Deluxe Edition)
"Phone Tap"	2014	Rick Ross	Hood Billionaire
"Off The Corner" (With Meek Mill)	2014	Rick Ross	Face To Face
"Silk Road"	2015	Rick Ross	Black Market
"Often"	2015	The Weeknd	Beauty Behind the Madness
"Acquainted"	2015	The Weeknd	Beauty Behind the Madness
"As You Are"	2015	The Weeknd	Beauty Behind the Madness
"Came From Nothing"	2015	Belly	Up for Days
"No Option"	2015	Belly	Up for Days
"Might Not" (Featuring The Weeknd)	2015	Belly	Up for Days
"White Girls" (Featuring Travis Scott)	2015	Belly	Up for Days
"Dealer Plated" (Featuring French Montana)	2015	Belly	Up for Days
"Who Am I"	2015	Belly	Up for Days
"Show Must Go On" (Featuring Machine Gun Kelly & Math Allen)	2015	Kid Ink	Full Speed
"Pullin' Up" (Featuring The Weeknd)	2015	Meek Mill	Dreams Worth More Than Money
"Bad for You" (Featuring Nicki Minaj)	2015	Meek Mill	Dreams Worth More Than Money
"Pray 4 Love" (Featuring The Weeknd)	2015	Travis Scott	Rodeo
"6 Inch" (Featuring The Weeknd)	2016	Beyoncé	Lemonade
"Pick These Hoes Apart" (Featuring Kodak Black, Jeezy & French Montana)	2016	DJ Khaled	Major Key
"Party Monster"	2016	The Weeknd	Starboy
"Six Feet Under"	2016	The Weeknd	Starboy
"Nothing Without You"	2016	The Weeknd	Starboy
"All I Know" (Featuring Future)	2016	The Weeknd	Starboy
"Ballerina"	2016	Belly	Another Day in Paradise
"You" (Featuring Kehlani)	2016	Belly	Another Day in Paradise
"Favorite Color"	2016	Belly	Another Day in Paradise
"God Bless"	2016	Belly	Another Day in Paradise
"Barely Sober" (Featuring Lil Wayne)	2016	Belly	Another Day in Paradise
"Zanzibar" (Featuring Juicy J)	2016	Belly	Another Day in Paradise
"Angels & Demons" (Featuring B-Real)	2016	Belly	Another Day in Paradise
"Trap Phone" (Featuring Jadakiss)	2016	Belly	Inzombia
"Frozen Water" (Featuring Future)	2016	Belly	Inzombia
"Outkast" (Featuring Ty Dolla Sign)	2016	Belly	Inzombia
"Seven Day Love" (Featuring Ashanti)	2016	Belly	Inzombia
"Judas"	2016	Banks	The Altar
"27 Hours"	2016	Banks	The Altar
"Lil Haiti Baby"	2016	Future	Evol
"Low Life" (Featuring The Weeknd)	2016	Future	Evol
"Bible" (Featuring Lil Wayne)	2016	Yo Gotti	The Art of Hustle
"Down in the DM"	2016	Yo Gotti	The Art of Hustle
"General" (Featuring Future)	2016	Yo Gotti	The Art of Hustle
"Facts" (With Moneybagg Yo)	2016	Yo Gotti	2 Federal
"Lifestyle" (Featuring LunchMoney Lewis)	2016	Yo Gotti	White Friday (CM9)
"What Happened"	2016	Yo Gotti	White Friday (CM9)
"Castro" (Featuring Kanye West, Big Sean, 2 Chainz & Quavo)	2016	Yo Gotti	White Friday (CM9)
"Weatherman" (Featuring Kodak Black)	2016	Yo Gotti	White Friday (CM9)
"What Happened" (Featuring Lil Wayne)	2016	2 Chainz	ColleGrove
"War Pain" (Featuring Omelly)	2016	Meek Mill	4/4 (EP series)
"Lockjaw" (Featuring Kodak Black)	2016	French Montana	Wave Gods
"Pull a Caper" (Featuring Kodak Black, Gucci Mane & Rick Ross)	2017	DJ Khaled	Grateful
"Bobby Brown"	2017	Belly	Mumble Rap
"P.O.P."	2017	Belly	Mumble Rap
"All Alone"	2017	Belly	Mumble Rap
"Trippin"	2017	French Montana	Jungle Rules
"What Lovers Do" (Featuring SZA)	2017	Maroon 5	Red Pill Blues
"Change My Ways"	2017	Kodak Black	Project Baby 2
"Pride"	2017	Kodak Black	Project Baby 2
"No CoDefendant"	2017	Kodak Black	Project Baby 2
"Day for Day"	2017	Kodak Black	Painting Pictures
"Coolin and Booted"	2017	Kodak Black	Painting Pictures
"U Ain't Never"	2017	Kodak Black	Painting Pictures
"Patty Cake"	2017	Kodak Black	Painting Pictures
"Save You"	2017	Kodak Black	Painting Pictures
"Reminiscing" (Featuring A Boogie wit da Hoodie)	2017	Kodak Black	Painting Pictures
"Why They Call You Kodak"	2017	Kodak Black	Painting Pictures
"What If"	2017	Kevin Gates	By Any Means 2
"Back Gate"	2017	Yo Gotti	I Still Am
"Juice"	2017	Yo Gotti	I Still Am
"Save It for Me" (Featuring Chris Brown)	2017	Yo Gotti	I Still Am
"2908"	2017	Yo Gotti	I Still Am
"Around the World"	2017	Yo Gotti	I Still Am
"Good Life" (With Kehlani)	2017	G-Eazy	The Fate of the Furious (soundtrack)
"Tomorrow Til Infinity" (Featuring Gunna)	2017	Young Thug	Beautiful Thugger Girls
"All About It" (Featuring French Montana)	2017	Fabolous & Jadakiss	Friday on Elm Street
"On & On" (Featuring Tory Lanez & Belly)	2017	Juicy J	Rubba Band Business
"Another Note" (Featuring Zack)	2018	Belly	Immigrant
"Bed" (Featuring Ariana Grande)	2018	Nicki Minaj	Queen
"Girls" (Featuring Cardi B, Bebe Rexha & Charli XCX)	2018	Rita Ora	Phoenix
"Wanted You" (Featuring Lil Uzi Vert)	2018	Nav	Reckless
"With Me"	2018	Nav	Reckless
"The Rage"	2018	Kid Cudi	Rampage (soundtrack)
"Codeine Dreaming" (Featuring Lil Wayne)	2018	Kodak Black	Heart Break Kodak
"I Get Lonely"	2018	Kodak Black	Heart Break Kodak
"Call You"	2018	Kodak Black	Heart Break Kodak
"Take One"	2018	Kodak Black	Dying to Live
"In the Flesh"	2018	Kodak Black	Dying to Live
"If I'm Lyin, I'm Flyin"	2018	Kodak Black	Dying to Live
"Don't Cry" (Featuring XXXTentacion)	2018	Lil Wayne	Tha Carter V (Deluxe Edition)
"Can't Be Broken"	2018	Lil Wayne	Tha Carter V (Deluxe Edition)
"Open Letter"	2018	Lil Wayne	Tha Carter V (Deluxe Edition)
"More to the Story" (Featuring Raekwon)	2018	Lil Wayne	Tha Carter V (Deluxe Edition)
"Lower Level" (Featuring Kodak Black)	2018	Moneybagg Yo	Reset
"Secrets"	2018	Moneybagg Yo	2 Heartless
"Motivation" (Featuring Hypnotic Brass Ensemble)	2018	Snoop Dogg	220 (EP)
"Thugz Mansion" (Featuring Ty Dolla Sign & YG)	2018	Mozzy	Gangland Landlord
"Drip"	2018	City Girls	Girl Code
"Villain"	2018	YoungBoy Never Broke Again	Until Death Call My Name
"Mexico"	2018	BlocBoy JB	Simi
"No Velcro"	2018	BlocBoy JB	Simi
"Freak n You" (Featuring Lil Wayne & Gunna)	2019	DJ Khaled	Father of Asahd
"Holy Ground" (Featuring Buju Banton)	2019	DJ Khaled	Father of Asahd
"Broken"	2019	Kim Petras	Clarity
"Rules"	2019	Doja Cat	Hot Pink
"Wiggle It" (With Quality Control Featuring City Girls)	2019	French Montana	Montana & Control the Streets, Volume 2
"Shawty Do You"	2019	Flipp Dinero	Love for Guala
"Till I'm Gone" (Featuring Kodak Black)	2019	Flipp Dinero	Love for Guala
"Know Yo Worth"	2020	Yo Gotti	Untrapped
"They Ain't Want Me to Know"	2020	Yo Gotti	Untrapped
"Pose" (Featuring Lil Uzi Vert & Megan Thee Stallion)	2020	Yo Gotti	Untrapped
"Weekend" (Featuring Moneybagg Yo)	2020	Yo Gotti	Untrapped
"Trust Nobody" (Featuring Adam Levine)	2020	Lil Wayne	Funeral
"Ball Hard" (Featuring Lil Twist)	2020	Lil Wayne	Funeral
"Hot"	2020	Pia Mia	TBA
"Moment of Silence"	2021	Belly	See You Next Wednesday
"Party Lyfe" (Featuring DaBaby)	2021	Polo G	Hall of Fame 2.0
"Gone Forever" (Featuring Remy Ma & DJ Khaled)	2022	Mary J. Blige	Good Morning Gorgeous (Deluxe Edition)
"30mgs" (Featuring Vory)	2022	Beam	Alien
"Greater Together (Album Version)"	2023	John Paesano	Marvel's Spider-Man 2 (Original Video Game Soundtrack)
"Hip-Hop (with BigXthaPlug featuring Jay Jones)"	2025	Lil Wayne	Tha Carter VI

== Audio engineering and mixing credits ==
Album	Year	Artist	Label
We the Best	2007	DJ Khaled	Terror Squad Entertainment / Koch Records
Teflon Don	2010	Rick Ross	Maybach Music Group / Def Jam Recordings
Mastermind	2014	Rick Ross	Maybach Music Group / Def Jam Recordings
Starboy	2016	The Weeknd	XO / Republic Records
Another Day in Paradise	2016	Belly	XO / Roc Nation
Mumble Rap	2017	Belly	XO / Roc Nation / Republic Records

== Awards and nominations ==
Year	Ceremony	Award	Result	Ref
2017	BMI R&B/Hip-Hop Awards	Most-Performed Songs ("Low Life")	Won	
2017	59th Annual Grammy Awards	Grammy Award for Album of the Year (Lemonade)	Nominated	
2018	2018 BET Hip Hop Awards	Producer Of The Year	Nominated	
2023	65th Annual Grammy Awards	Grammy Award for Album of the Year (Good Morning Gorgeous (Deluxe))	Nominated	
