= See You Next Wednesday (album) =

Studio album by Belly
- Released: 27 August 2021
- Length: 40:50
- Labels: XO; Roc Nation
- Producers: Belly; Ben Billions; Bizzy; DannyBoyStyles; David x Eli; Infamous; Keanu Beats; Mike Wavvs; Money Musik; Myles Martin; Nav; Nick Lamb; Skinny; The ANMLS; The Weeknd; Wallis Lane; Zaytoven

Belly chronology
Immigrant (2018)	See You Next Wednesday (2021)	Mumble Rap 2 (2023)

Singles from See You Next Wednesday
- 1. "Money on the Table" / "IYKYK" Released: 7 April 2021; 2. "Zero Love" Released: 3 June 2021; 3. "Better Believe" Released: 22 July 2021; 4. "Die for It" Released: 27 August 2021; 5. "Requiem" Released: 15 September 2021; 6. "Flowers" Released: 18 November 2021

See You Next Wednesday is the third studio album by Palestinian-Canadian rapper Belly. It was released on 27 August 2021, through Roc Nation and XO. The album features guest appearances from The Weeknd, Young Thug, Moneybagg Yo, Gunna, PnB Rock, Nas, Nav, Lil Uzi Vert, Big Sean, and Benny the Butcher. Production was handled by Belly, the Weeknd, and Nav themselves, alongside DannyBoyStyles, Zaytoven, Infamous, Ben Billions, DaHeala, and Skinny, among others.

== Background ==
On 7 April 2020, Belly took to social media, where he revealed that for years he has been going to therapy for depression and PTSD. He also revealed that he regained the weight he had previously lost, and that he was on anti-depressants. He then hinted that new music was coming soon, by stating: "This shit is all I got, if anything can bring me back from the ashes; it's music, my family & my fans. I don't need sympathy or pity from anyone, I'm only saying this to let y'all know: I won't lay down and die... see you next wednesday". On January 14, 2021, Belly revealed that he received the "seal of approval" from Jay-Z and the Weeknd, and that the album would be titled See You Next Wednesday and was finished. Belly would later state in an interview that the album's title pays homage to film director John Landis and his well-known running gag of the same name. On 17 August, Belly revealed the album's release date and tracklist.

== Release and promotion ==
=== Singles ===
The dual lead singles of the album, "Money on the Table", which features American rapper Benny the Butcher, and "IYKYK", was released on 7 April 2021, Belly's 37th birthday, and the official music video for the former song was released on exactly a week later. The second single, "Zero Love", which features American rapper Moneybagg Yo, was released on June 3. The music video was released on 9 June. The third single, "Better Believe", a collaboration with Canadian singer the Weeknd and American rapper Young Thug, was released on 22 July. The music video was released on the same day. The song debuted on the US Billboard Hot 100 chart at number 88. The fourth single, "Die for It", another collaboration with The Weeknd that features American rapper Nas, was released along with the album and the official music video on 27 August 2021. The fifth single, "Requiem", which features Canadian rapper Nav, was released along with the official music video on 15 September 2021. The sixth and final single, "Flowers", was released along with the official music video on 18 November 2021.

== Track listing ==
See You Next Wednesday track listing
No.	Title	Writer(s)	Producer(s)	Length
1.	"Snakes & Ladders"	Ahmad Balshe; Danny Schofield; Richard Muñoz; Faris Al-Majed	DannyBoyStyles; The ANMLS	2:16
2.	"IYKYK"	Balshe; Schofield; Muñoz; Al-Majed; Keanu Torres	DannyBoyStyles; The ANMLS	3:09
3.	"Better Believe" (with the Weeknd and Young Thug)	Balshe; Abel Tesfaye; Jeffery Williams; Xavier Dotson; Schofield; Muñoz; Al-Majed	Zaytoven; DannyBoyStyles; The ANMLS	3:26
4.	"Zero Love" (featuring Moneybagg Yo)	Balshe; Demario White, Jr.; Muñoz; Al-Majed	Belly; The ANMLS	2:32
5.	"Moment of Silence"	Balshe; Marco Rodriguez-Diaz, Jr.; Benjamin Diehl	Infamous; Ben Billions	2:01
6.	"Flowers"	Balshe; Otis Rush, Jr.; Jason Quenneville; Schofield; Myles Martin; Nick Lamb; Brandon Hollemon; Artie Makris	DannyBoyStyles; Myles Martin; DaHeala; Lamb; Bizzy	2:48
7.	"Razor" (featuring Gunna and PnB Rock)	Balshe; Sergio Kitchens; Rakim Allen; Schofield; Mohkom Bhangal; David Ruoff; Elias Klughammer; Muñoz; Al-Majed; Joshua Gottmanns; Dennis Jüngel	DannyBoyStyles; Money Musik; David x Eli	2:49
8.	"Die for It" (with The Weeknd featuring Nas)	Balshe; Tesfaye; Nasir Jones; Sonia Ben Ammar; Sami Hamed; Quenneville; Muñoz; Al-Majed	The ANMLS; DaHeala; Skinny	3:19
9.	"Requiem" (featuring Nav)	Balshe; Navraj Goraya; Tesfaye; Andrew Franklin	Nav; DaHeala^{[a]}	3:39
10.	"Two Tone" (featuring Lil Uzi Vert)	Balshe; Symere Woods; Tesfaye; Muñoz; Al-Majed	The Weeknd; The ANMLS	2:44
11.	"Wu Tang"	Balshe; Schofield; Muñoz; Al-Majed	Belly; DannyBoyStyles	2:18
12.	"Sucker"	Balshe; Muñoz; Al-Majed; Nima Jahanbin; Paimon Jahanbin; Michael Washington, Jr.	The ANMLS; Wallis Lane; Mike Wavvs	2:18
13.	"Scary Sight" (featuring Big Sean)	Balshe; Sean Anderson; Muñoz; Al-Majed	The ANMLS	1:53
14.	"Money on the Table" (featuring Benny the Butcher)	Balshe; Jeremie Pennick; Hamed; Muñoz; Al-Majed	Skinny; The ANMLS	2:05
15.	"Can You Feel It"	Balshe; Kevin Cossom; David Plakon; Peter Baldwin; John Ramos; Muñoz; Al-Majed	The ANMLS	3:33
Total length:				40:50

Notes

- ^[a] signifies an additional producer.
- "Requiem" features background vocals from the Weeknd.

== Personnel ==
- Fabian Marasciullo – mixing (tracks 1, 3–13, 15)
- Colin Leonard – mastering
- DannyBoyStyles – programming (tracks 1–3, 6, 7, 10, 11, 15), keyboards (tracks 1, 3, 6, 7, 10, 11, 15), mixing (track 2), recording (tracks 2, 6, 8, 11)
- The ANMLS
  - Richard Muñoz – programming (tracks 1–3, 8, 10, 12, 13, 15), keyboards (tracks 1, 3, 8, 10, 12, 13, 15)
  - Faris Al-Majed – recording (tracks 1–6, 8–15), programming (tracks 1–3, 8, 10, 12, 13, 15), keyboards (tracks 1, 3, 8, 10, 12, 13, 15), mixing (track 14)
- Ben Billions – programming, keyboards (track 5)
- Shin Kamiyama – recording (tracks 3, 7, 8)
- Myles Martin – programming, keyboards (track 6)
- Money Musik – programming, keyboards (track 7)
- DaHeala – programming, keyboards (track 8)
- Gabriel Zardes – recording (track 8)
- Mark Goodchild – recording (track 8)
- Nav – programming, keyboards (track 9)
- Pro Logic – recording (track 9)
- The Weeknd – programming, keyboards (track 10)
- Belly – programming, keyboards (track 11)

== Charts ==
Chart performance for See You Next Wednesday
Chart (2021)	Peak position
Canadian Albums (Billboard)	26
US Billboard 200	191
US Independent Albums (Billboard)	27
