= 6 Inch =

Song by Beyoncé featuring the Weeknd

from the album Lemonade
- Released: April 23, 2016
- Studio: Record Plant (Los Angeles)
- Genre: R&B
- Length: 4:20
- Label: Parkwood; Columbia
- Songwriters: Abel Tesfaye; Beyoncé; Danny Schofield; Ben Diehl; Terius Nash; Ahmad Balshe; Jordan Asher; David Portner; Noah Lennox; Brian Weitz; Burt Bacharach; Hal David; Raini Rodriguez
- Producers: DannyBoyStyles; Ben Billions; Beyoncé; Boots

Audio
- "6 Inch" on YouTube

"6 Inch" is an R&B song by American singer Beyoncé featuring Canadian singer The Weeknd. It is the fifth track on her sixth studio album, Lemonade (2016), released through Parkwood Entertainment and Columbia Records. The song's music video is part of Beyoncé's 2016 film Lemonade, aired on HBO alongside the album's release.

The song's original portions were written by the artists alongside DannyBoyStyles, Ben Billions, The-Dream, Belly, and Boots. Also credited as songwriters are Burt Bacharach and Hal David (for the sample of American soul musician Isaac Hayes' 1969 version of "Walk On By") and Avey Tare, Panda Bear, and Geologist of neo-psychedelic band Animal Collective (for an interpolation of their 2009 song "My Girls").

== Background and recording ==
Music producer Ben "Billions" Diehl talked to Billboard about his work with great artists and mentioned that Beyoncé had already known of a song named "6 Inch" since 2013. According to Diehl, he, rapper Belly and producer DannyBoyStyles met in October of the same year to work on music. "Originally a Belly song with participation from French Montana," Diehl said. "We got a response that Beyoncé had liked and then we decided: we should continue working together, I think they get somewhere. It turns out you do not know when that day will come." When she released her surprise visual album in December 2013, Diehl was quick to check out the track listing of songs, but "6 Inch" was not there. "Everything went well," Diehl concludes. After three years, in 2016, the song finally came out on Beyoncé's sixth album, Lemonade, with a guest appearance from the Weeknd.

== Critical reception ==
The Guardian writer Alexis Petridis described the song as a "weird, affecting mixture of defiance and vulnerability" on which Beyoncé "slurs and snarls about being rich and hard-working" in "ominous electronics" sounds. Larry Bartleet NME defined the song the "personal track" of the album and the "Beyoncé's ode to hard-working women".

Emily J. Lordi of The Fader wrote that the song sound "aggressive and lively", believing that it "exploits Hayes' great orchestral work to tell the story of one woman", considering the latter to be "the cleverness" thing as the song "inserts the stories of multiple women into the image of a singular figure".

== Commercial performance ==
After the release of Lemonade, "6 Inch" debuted on Billboard Hot 100 at number 18 on the chart dating May 14, 2016, becoming Beyoncé's twenty-sixth top 20 on the chart. "6 Inch" also entered on the Hot R&B/Hip-Hop songs chart at number ten, becoming Beyoncé's twenty-seventh top-ten single on the chart. In overseas charts, the song entered in digital charts in top five, including Greece and Sweden. As of June 2016, the song has sold 265,607 downloads in US.

== Live performances ==
"6 Inch" was first performed at a Tidal charity concert. It was also included on the set list of the final concert on The Formation World Tour, on October 7, 2016, at New Jersey's MetLife Stadium with the singer performing the song while suspended upside down.

== Charts ==
=== Weekly charts ===
Weekly chart performance
Chart (2016)	Peak position
Australia Urban Singles (ARIA)	6
Belgium (Ultratip Flanders)	15
Canada Hot 100 (Billboard)	31
Euro Digital Song Sales (Billboard)	13
Finland Download (Latauslista)	27
France (SNEP)	47
Germany (GfK)	71
Greece Digital Songs (Billboard)	4
Iceland (RÚV)	3
Scottish Singles Sales (Official Charts)	31
Sweden (Sverigetopplistan)	86
Sweden Digital Songs (Billboard)	4
UK Singles (Official Charts)	35
UK Hip Hop/R&B (Official Charts)	11
US Billboard Hot 100	18
US Hot R&B/Hip-Hop Songs (Billboard)	10

=== Year-end charts ===
Annual chart rankings
Chart (2016)	Position
US Hot R&B Songs (Billboard)	37

== Certifications ==
Certifications and sales
Region	Certification	Certified units/sales
Australia (ARIA)	Gold	35,000^{‡}
Brazil (Pro-Música Brasil)	Gold	30,000^{‡}
Canada (Music Canada)	Gold	40,000^{‡}
United Kingdom (BPI)	Silver	200,000^{‡}
United States (RIAA)	Platinum	1,000,000^{‡}
^{‡} Sales+streaming figures based on certification alone.
