= Mumble Rap 2 =

Mixtape by Belly
- Released: 19 May 2023
- Length: 26:12
- Label: XO; Roc Nation
- Producer: Corbett; DannyBoyStyles; Hit-Boy; Nick Lamb; Prince85; Rogét Chahayed; The ANMLS

Belly chronology
See You Next Wednesday (2021)	Mumble Rap 2 (2023)	96 Miles from Bethlehem (2024)

Singles from Mumble Rap 2
- 1. "American Nightmare" Released: 21 April 2023; 2. "Ambiance" Released: 5 May 2023; 3. "Cocaine Spoon" Released: 19 May 2023

Mumble Rap 2 is the twelfth mixtape by Palestinian-Canadian rapper Belly. It was released on 19 May 2023 through XO and Roc Nation. The mixtape features guest appearances from the late Gil Scott-Heron, Nav, Gucci Mane, and Rick Ross. It was primarily produced by Hit-Boy, alongside the ANMLS, Prince85, Corbett, DannyBoyStyles, Nick Lamb, and Rogét Chahayed. It also serves as a sequel to Belly's previous mixtape, Mumble Rap (2017), which was primarily produced by Boi-1da. The mixtape was supported by three singles, "American Nightmare", "Ambiance", and the Rick Ross-assisted "Cocaine Spoon". It is the first of Belly's final three albums before retiring. Belly and Hit-Boy revealed the tracklist on 28 April 2023. On 21 April 2023, the same day that Belly announced the mixtape, he spoke about it in a press release: "With the first Mumble Rap I had already had a hit record and I wanted to remind people not to forget, where I actually come from & that I really do this".

== Release and promotion ==
On 21 July 2022, Belly announced the existence of the mixtape through a tweet. On 2 September 2022, he announced that Hit-Boy, the Anmls, DaHeala, and DannyBoyStyles were producers who were involved in the mixtape. Exactly two weeks later, he asked fans to guess who the featured artists on it are and gave the starting letter for each one of their names. Three days after that, he revealed their names after a Twitter user named @sonyaaroberts guessed it correctly. The lead and only single of the mixtape, "American Nightmare", was released on 21 April 2023. The second single, "Ambiance", was released on 5 May 2023. The third and final single, "Cocaine Spoon", which features American rapper Rick Ross, was released alongside the mixtape on 19 May 2023.

== Track listing ==
Mumble Rap 2 track listing
No.	Title	Writer(s)	Producer(s)	Length
1.	"Capone's Demise"	Ahmad Balshe; Chauncey Hollis, Jr.	Hit-Boy	1:25
2.	"Ambiance"	Balshe; Richard Muñoz; Faris Al-Majed	The ANMLS	2:17
3.	"Loyalty v. Royalty" (featuring Gil Scott-Heron)	Balshe; Gilbert Scott-Heron; Muñoz; Al-Majed	The ANMLS	2:19
4.	"Heroic Villains"	Balshe; Muñoz; Al-Majed; Mejdi Rhars	The ANMLS; Prince85	2:06
5.	"Just Like Me" (featuring Nav)	Balshe; Navraj Goraya; Hollis	Hit-Boy	2:12
6.	"World Changed"	Balshe; Hollis; Dustin Corbett	Hit-Boy; Corbett	2:49
7.	"American Nightmare"	Balshe; Hollis; Danny Schofield; Nick Lamb	Hit-Boy; DannyBoyStyles; Lamb	3:12
8.	"New Money, Old Devils"	Balshe; Hollis	Hit-Boy	1:53
9.	"De La Hoya" (featuring Gucci Mane)	Balshe; Radric Davis; Hollis	Hit-Boy	2:18
10.	"Cocaine Spoon" (featuring Rick Ross)	Balshe; William Roberts II; Rogét Chahayed; Hollis	Chahayed; Hit-Boy	2:35
11.	"Real Lapse"	Balshe; Muñoz; Al-Majed	The ANMLS	3:06
Total length:				26:12
