= Another Day in Paradise (mixtape) =

Mixtape by Belly
- Released: 27 May 2016
- Genre: Hip hop
- Length: 45:10
- Labels: XO; Roc Nation
- Producers: Ben Billions; DaHeala; DannyBoyStyles; Honorable C.N.O.T.E.; Infamous; Krack Keys; The ANMLS; Velous

Belly chronology
Up for Days (2015)	Another Day in Paradise (2016)	Inzombia (2016)

Singles from Another Day in Paradise
- 1. "Zanzibar" Released: 3 February 2016; 2. "You" Released: 26 August 2016; 3. "Ballerina" Released: 27 October 2016

Another Day in Paradise is the ninth mixtape by Palestinian-Canadian rapper Belly. It was released on 27 May 2016 through XO and Roc Nation. The mixtape features guest appearances from Starrah, Travis Scott, Waka Flocka Flame, Kehlani, Lil Wayne, Juicy J, and B-Real. Production was handled by the ANMLS, DannyBoyStyles, DaHeala, Infamous, Velous, Krack Keys, and Honorable C.N.O.T.E.

== Background ==
Belly stated in an interview with Billboard that his music is all about progress: "I feel like it took me a lifetime to gain the experience and the knowledge that I needed to put the project together, you know what I mean? But all my projects are ongoing. I'm halfway through the album right now, I just put this out, I've got another short mixtape I'm working on on the side." When describing the concept behind the project, he states that "People think of paradise as sunlight, palm trees and beaches. For me, paradise is all the hell I had to go through to get here. And every time I look at all this beautiful scenery, that's the first thing I think about. That's what I compare it to. And that's my paradise. That's kind of the concept behind the project.

== Singles ==
The lead single of the mixtape, "Zanzibar", which features American rapper Juicy J, was released on 3 February 2016. The music video was released 18 May 2016.

The second single "You", which features American singer Kehlani, was released on 26 August 2016. The music video was released on the same day.

The third single, "Ballerina", was released on 27 October 2016. The music video was released on the same day. The remix features American singer Ty Dolla Sign and was released on 18 November 2016.

== Other songs ==
The first promotional single, "Money Go", which features American rapper and singer Travis Scott, was released on 24 November 2015. The music video was released 27 May 2016 with the mixtape.

The second promotional single, "It's All Love", which features American singer Starrah, was released on 18 July 2016. The music video was released on the same day.

== Track listing ==
No.	Title	Writer(s)	Producer(s)	Length
1.	"It's All Love" (featuring Starrah)	Ahmad Balshe; Brittany Hazzard; Richard Muñoz; Faris Al-Majed; Danny Schofield; Jason Quenneville; Marco Rodriguez-Diaz; Lauryn Hill; Frederick Hibbert; Brian White	The ANMLS; DannyBoyStyles^{[a]}; DaHeala^{[a]}; Infamous^{[a]}	3:53
2.	"Money Go" (featuring Travis Scott)	Balshe; Jacques Webster II; Tyler Bryant	Velous	3:36
3.	"Ballerina"	Balshe; Khaled Khaled; Benjamin Diehl; Quenneville; Eddie Montilla	Ben Billions; DaHeala^{[a]}; Krack Keys^{[b]}	4:13
4.	"Exotic" (featuring Waka Flocka Flame)	Balshe; Juaquin Malphurs; Carlton Mays, Jr.	Honorable C.N.O.T.E.	3:44
5.	"You" (featuring Kehlani)	Balshe; Kehlani Parrish; Willie Hutch; Diehl; Khaled	Ben Billions	4:24
6.	"Another Day in Paradise"	Balshe; Schofield; Zulema Cusseaux; White	DannyBoyStyles	3:21
7.	"Favorite Color"	Balshe; Schofield; Diehl; Khaled; Montilla	DannyBoyStyles; Ben Billions	3:38
8.	"God Bless"	Balshe; Khaled; Diehl; Montilla	Ben Billions; Krack Keys^{[b]}	3:57
9.	"Barely Sober" (featuring Lil Wayne)	Balshe; Dwayne Carter, Jr.; Diehl; Bryant; Khaled	Ben Billions; Velous	3:39
10.	"Amsterdam"	Balshe; Muñoz; Al-Majed	The ANMLS	3:37
11.	"Zanzibar" (featuring Juicy J)	Balshe; Jordan Houston; Diehl	Ben Billions	3:53
12.	"Angels & Demons" (featuring B-Real)	Balshe; Louis Freese; Diehl; Khaled; Jacob Kasher	Ben Billions	3:15
Total length:				45:10

Track notes

- ^{^[a]} signifies a co-producer.
- ^{^[b]} signifies an additional producer.

Sample notes

- "It's All Love" contains an interpolation of "Lost Ones", performed by Lauryn Hill.
- "You" contains a sample of "Things Done Changed", performed by The Notorious B.I.G.

== Personnel ==
Credits were adapted from Tidal.

Performers

- Belly – primary artist
- Starrah – featured artist (track 1)
- Travis Scott – featured artist (track 2)
- Waka Flocka Flame – featured artist (track 4)
- Kehlani – featured artist (track 5)
- Lil Wayne – featured artist (track 9)
- Juicy J – featured artist (track 11)
- B-Real – featured artist (track 12)

Technical

- Jason Quenneville – recording engineer (track 1), mixing engineer (track 2)
- Faris Al-Majed – recording engineer (tracks 1–3, 5, 6, 8–12)
- Raphael Mesquita – assistant recording engineer (tracks 1, 3, 5–8, 10–12), recording engineer (tracks 2, 9)
- Tony Maserati – mixing engineer (tracks 1, 5, 12)
- Chris Athens – mastering engineer (tracks 1, 2, 4–11)
- Dave Huffman – mastering engineer (tracks 1, 2, 4–11)
- Josh Smith – recording engineer (tracks 2, 5, 7, 8, 12)
- Manny Marroquin – mixing engineer (tracks 4, 5, 9)
- Chris Galland – mixing engineer (tracks 4, 5, 9)
- Jeff Jackson – assistant recording engineer (tracks 4, 5, 9)
- Robin Florent – assistant recording engineer (tracks 4, 5, 9)
- Danny Schofield – mixing engineer (track 7)
- Benjamin Diehl – mixing engineer (track 8)
- Fabian Marasciullo – mixing engineer (track 10)
- McCoy Socalgargoyle – mixing engineer (track 10)
- Crazy Mike – recording engineer (track 11)

Production

- The ANMLS – producer (tracks 1, 10)
- DannyBoyStyles – co-producer (track 1), producer (track 6)
- DaHeala – co-producer (track 1, 3)
- Infamous – co-producer (track 1)
- Velous – producer (track 2, 9)
- Ben Billions – producer (tracks 3, 5, 7–9, 11, 12)
- Krack Keys – additional producer (tracks 3, 8)
- Honorable C.N.O.T.E. – producer (track 4)
