= Mumble Rap (mixtape) =

Mixtape by Belly
- Released: 6 October 2017
- Genre: Hip hop
- Length: 32:14
- Label: XO; Roc Nation; Republic
- Producer: Allen Ritter; Ben Billions; Boi-1da; Brett Kruger; DannyBoyStyles; Frank Dukes; Katalyst; Ken Lewis; Nick Brongers; T-Minus; Vinylz

Belly chronology
Inzombia (2016)	Mumble Rap (2017)	Immigrant (2018)

Singles from Mumble Rap
- 1. "P.O.P." Released: 25 July 2017

Mumble Rap is the eleventh mixtape by Palestinian-Canadian rapper Belly. It was released on 6 October 2017 through XO, Roc Nation, and Republic Records. The mixtape features a sole guest appearance from Pusha T. It includes production from Boi-1da mainly, alongside Allen Ritter, Ben Billions, DannyBoyStyles, Frank Dukes, T-Minus and Vinylz, among others. A sequel was released on 19 May 2023.

== Background ==
On 5 October 2017, Belly was interviewed by Zane Lowe on his radio show on Beats 1 and announced the project's title, in which he called Boi-1da the executive producer. He also talked about how the mixtape came to fruition, Boi-1da's involvement and reclaiming what the title phrase meant in rap, by stating

"It started with me and Boi-1da. We've always wanted to worked together. We've always been big fans of each other. We've done one-off songs in the past. We wanted to do a full project, something special. He produced like 75 percent of it. I wanted to snatch the word back. I want when people say mumble rap now, they're going to think of this, one of the greatest rap projects ever put out. That's what I want people to think."

== Singles ==
The lead single, "P.O.P." was released on 25 July 2017. The song was produced by Ben Billions. The music video was directed by Director X. It was released on 9 August 2017 and stars American model Blac Chyna. The first promotional single is "Lullaby". The music video for Lullaby was released as a Tidal exclusive on 3 October 2017. The second promotional single is "Mumble Rap". The music video for "Mumble Rap" was released the same day as the mixtape was released. The third promotional single is "Immigration to the Trap". The music video was released 13 October 2017. The final promotional single is "The Come Down is Real Too". The music video was released 6 December 2017.

== Track listing ==
Mumble Rap
No.	Title	Writer(s)	Producer(s)	Length
1.	"Immigration To the Trap"	Ahmad Balshe; Matthew Samuels	Boi-1da	1:53
2.	"Make a Toast"	Balshe; Samuels; Anderson Hernandez; Tyler Williams; Allen Ritter; Danny Schofield; Omerror Dawson III	Boi-1da; Vinylz; T-Minus; Ritter; DannyBoyStyles^{[b]}	4:26
3.	"The Come Down Is Real Too"	Balshe; Schofield; Williams; Brian Morgan	T-Minus	3:51
4.	"Mumble Rap"	Balshe; Schofield; Ennio Morricone	DannyBoyStyles	2:43
5.	"Lullaby"	Balshe; Samuels; Brent Kolatalo; Brett Kruger; Ken Lewis	Boi-1da; Katalyst^{[a]}; Kruger^{[a]}; Lewis^{[b]}	3:14
6.	"Bobby Brown"	Balshe; Benjamin Diehl; Khaled Khaled; Czesław Wydrzycki; Norman Simon	Ben Billions	2:46
7.	"Papyrus"	Balshe; Schofield; Michel Polnareff	DannyBoyStyles	2:13
8.	"Alcantara" (featuring Pusha T)	Balshe; Terrence Thornton; Adam Feeney; Samuels; Schofield	Frank Dukes; Boi-1da; DannyBoyStyles^{[b]}	3:07
9.	"Clean Edit"	Balshe; Samuels; Nick Brongers	Boi-1da; Brongers^{[a]}	2:08
10.	"P.O.P."	Balshe; Diehl; Khaled	Ben Billions	3:21
11.	"All Alone"	Balshe; Diehl; Khaled	Ben Billions	2:32
Total length:				32:14

Notes

- ^{^[a]} signifies a co-producer
- ^{^[b]} signifies an additional producer

Sample credits

- "The Come Down Is Real Too" contains a sample from "I'm So into You", performed by SWV
- "Mumble Rap" contains a sample from Ennio Morricone's original composition "Grazie Zia"
- "Papyrus" contains a sample from "Voyages", performed by Michel Polnareff

== Personnel ==
Instruments

- DannyBoyStyles – keyboard (track 2)
- Ben Billions – keyboard (tracks 6, 7, 10, 11)

Technical

- Faris Al-Majed – recording (tracks 1–3, 5–9)
- Danny Schofield – recording (track 4)
- Benjamin Diehl – recording (tracks 10, 11), mixing (track 10)
- Jaycen Joshua – mixing (tracks 1–9, 11)
- David Nakaji – mixing assistant (tracks 1–9, 11)
- Iván Jiménez – mixing assistant (tracks 1–9, 11)

Creative

- Fluency Creative - creative direction

== Charts ==
Chart (2017)	Peak position
Canadian Albums (Billboard)	55
