= Up for Days =

Mixtape by Belly
- Released: 7 May 2015
- Genre: Hip hop
- Length: 37:13
- Label: XO; Roc Nation
- Producer: Belly; Ben Billions; Bizzy; Boi-1da; DaHeala; DannyBoyStyles; Infamous; The ANMLS

Belly chronology
| The Revolution (2007) | Up for Days (2015) | Another Day in Paradise (2016) |

Singles from Up for Days
- 1. "Might Not" Released: 18 December 2015

Up for Days is the eighth mixtape by Palestinian-Canadian rapper Belly. It was released through XO and Roc Nation on 7 May 2015. The mixtape features guest appearances from the Weeknd, Travis Scott, French Montana, and Juelz Santana. Production was handled by Belly himself, Ben Billions, DaHeala, Bizzy, Boi-1da, DannyBoyStyles, the ANMLS, and Infamous.

== Background ==
The project is Belly's first release since his five-year hiatus. Upon releasing the project, Belly stated "This is the introduction for me: it's not a new chapter in my story, it's a completely new book."

== Reception ==
Rose Lilah of HotNewHipHop praised the project, stating that during his hiatus, he was "perfecting and curating his latest body of work, Up For Days, and it definitely shows".

== Track listing ==
Up for Days
| No. | Title | Writer(s) | Producer(s) | Length |
|---|---|---|---|---|
| 1. | "Came From Nothing" | Ahmad Balshe; Benjamin Diehl | Ben Billions | 3:40 |
| 2. | "No Option" | Balshe; Diehl; Stamatis Spanoudakis; Clive Hodgson | Belly; Ben Billions | 2:57 |
| 3. | "Might Not" (featuring the Weeknd) | Balshe; Abel Tesfaye; Diehl | Ben Billions | 3:45 |
| 4. | "Come Down Is Real" | Balshe; Jason Quenneville; Brandon Hollemon | DaHeala; Bizzy^{[a]} | 4:17 |
| 5. | "Maison" | Balshe; Matthew Samuels | Boi-1da | 3:19 |
| 6. | "White Girls" (featuring Travis Scott) | Balshe; Jacques Webster II; Diehl | Ben Billions | 4:32 |
| 7. | "Dealer Plated" (featuring French Montana) | Balshe; Karim Kharbouch; Danny Schofield; Diehl | DannyBoyStyles; Ben Billions | 4:10 |
| 8. | "Poltergeist" | Balshe; Schofield; Brian White | DannyBoyStyles | 3:29 |
| 9. | "Love Kills" (featuring Juelz Santana) | Balshe; LaRon James; Schofield; Richard Muñoz; Faris Al-Majed; Joseph Bostani; Hollemon | DannyBoyStyles; The ANMLS | 4:18 |
| 10. | "Who Am I" | Balshe; Diehl; Marco Rodriguez-Diaz, Jr. | Ben Billions; Infamous | 2:46 |
| Total length: | | | | 37:13 |

Notes

- ^{^[a]} signifies a co-producer
