= Black Atlass =

Canadian hip-hop artist

- Born: Alexander Fleming; March 19, 1994 (age 32); Montreal, Quebec, Canada
- Origin: Montreal, Quebec, Canada
- Genre: Alternative R&B
- Occupations: Singer, songwriter, model
- Years active: 2012–present
- Labels: Republic, XO (former)
- Website: http://blackatlass.com

Alexander Fleming (born March 19, 1994), professionally known as Black Atlass, is a Canadian singer, songwriter and model. His song, Paris, debuted in a Louis Vuitton campaign, and was also featured in a Saint Laurent fragrance ad. He was previously signed to XO/Republic Records and released his debut studio album, Pain & Pleasure, in 2018. He released his second studio album Dream Awake in 2020.

== Early life ==
Black Atlass was born in Montreal, Quebec. After his father got a new job his family settled in London, Ontario, where he grew up.

== Career ==
Black Atlass began his career in the music industry while he was still in high school. He created an eponymous EP, The Black Atlass EP, in his parents' basement in 2012. The EP's single, Paris, was used by the luxury retailer, Louis Vuitton, to score a film celebrating their exhibit at the Musée Des Arts Décoratifs. The track was also featured in a Saint Laurent fragrance ad in 2013. The same year, Black Atlass was invited to the front row and dressed by Christian Dior's menswear designer Kris Van Assche for their spring/summer 2014 show in Paris.

He released his second EP, Young Bloods, in 2014, on Fool's Gold Records. To promote the EP, toured in support of the French artist Woodkid, with dates in Toronto, Montreal and across Europe. Woodkid also directed the music video for one of the EP's songs, "Jewels", which starred the model Anja Rubik.

In the fall of 2016, Alexander Wang featured Black Atlass in his fashion campaign alongside Kylie Jenner, Vince Staples, Lexi Boling, Zoe Kravitz, A$AP Ferg, Big Sean, Metro Boomin, MØ, Skrillex, Tinashe, Tyga and others.

In 2018, he was signed to The Weeknd's record label XO, and released his debut studio album, Pain & Pleasure. In the same year, he collaborated with Jessie Reyez on the song "Sacrifice", which was featured on the Fifty Shades Freed soundtrack.

Black Atlass' second studio album, Dream Awake, was released on April 3, 2020. The album consists of 12 tracks. On July 1, 2022, he released the ‘side A’ of his EP “Infinite”, which was his first release independently via Black Atlass, Inc. since the expiration of his deal with XO/Republic.

== Discography ==
Title	Year	Type
The Black Atlass EP	2012	EP (6 tracks)
"Paris"	2013	Single
Young Bloods	2014	EP (6 tracks)
Haunted Paradise	2016	Album (11 tracks)
Pain & Pleasure	2018	Album (8 tracks)
"Sacrifice" (Fifty Shades Freed Original Motion Picture Soundtrack)	2018	Single
Dream Awake	2020	Album (12 tracks)
Infinite	2022	Album (10 tracks)
When The Darkness Fades	2023	EP (6 tracks)
I'll Meet You There	2024	EP (6 tracks)
Seven	2025	Album (7 tracks)

== Recognitions and nominations ==
In April 2013, Black Atlass was recognized as Vogue's "Artist of the Week". His album Pain & Pleasure was nominated for a JUNO Award for "R&B/Soul Recording Of The Year" in 2019.

== Personal life ==
Black Atlass is interested in photography and graphic design, and originally intended to carry both as a profession after high school.
