= Inzombia (mixtape) =

Mixtape by Belly
- Released: 11 November 2016
- Genre: Hip hop
- Length: 38:25
- Labels: XO; Roc Nation
- Producers: Belly; Ben Billions; Cubeatz; DaHeala; DannyBoyStyles; Infamous; Nav; The ANMLS; Velous

Belly chronology
| Another Day in Paradise (2016) | Inzombia (2016) | Mumble Rap (2017) |

Singles from Inzombia
- 1. "Re Up" Released: 31 January 2017

Inzombia is the tenth mixtape by Palestinian-Canadian rapper Belly. It was released on 11 November 2016 through XO and Roc Nation. The mixtape features guest appearances from Jadakiss, Future, Nav, Young Thug, Zack, Ty Dolla Sign, and Ashanti. Production was handled by Belly and Nav themselves, DannyBoyStyles, DaHeala, Velous, Cubeatz, Ben Billions, Infamous, and the ANMLS. The mixtape was supported by one single, "Re Up", which features Nav and was also solely produced by him.

== Background ==
In an interview with Billboard, Belly said: "Inzombia is a collection of moments from the darkest place I've ever known." This is his second project release for 2016, following Another Day in Paradise.

== Promotional singles ==
The lead single of the mixtape, "Re Up", which features Canadian rapper and record producer Nav, was released alongside a music video on 31 January 2017. The song was also solely produced by Nav, who had recently been signed to XO and then became a labelmate of Belly at the time of the release of the mixtape. Two promotional singles were both released two days before the release of the mixtape, on 9 November 2016. The first promotional single is "Consuela", which features American rappers Young Thug and Zack. The second promotional single is "The Day I Met You". The music video for the former song was released 23 March 2017.

== Track listing ==
Inzombia
| No. | Title | Writer(s) | Producer(s) | Length |
|---|---|---|---|---|
| 1. | "Die Alone" | Ahmad Balshe; Danny Schofield; Jason Quenneville | DannyBoyStyles; DaHeala | 3:22 |
| 2. | "The Day I Met You" | Balshe; Schofield; Tyler Bryant; Tim Gomringer; Kevin Gomringer | DannyBoyStyles; Velous; Cubeatz | 3:27 |
| 3. | "Trap Phone" (featuring Jadakiss) | Balshe; Jason Phillips; Benjamin Diehl; Marco Rodriguez-Diaz; Khaled Khaled | Ben Billions; Infamous | 3:31 |
| 4. | "Frozen Water" (featuring Future) | Balshe; Nayvadius Wilburn; Zakaria Kharbouch; Diehl; Schofield; Khaled; Richard Muñoz; Faris Al-Majed | Ben Billions; The ANMLS | 3:22 |
| 5. | "Re Up" (featuring Nav) | Balshe; Navraj Goraya | Nav | 4:19 |
| 6. | "Consuela" (featuring Young Thug and Zack) | Balshe; Jeffery Williams; Kharbouch; Schofield; Muñoz | Belly; DannyBoyStyles | 3:46 |
| 7. | "Outkast" (featuring Ty Dolla Sign) | Balshe; Tyrone Griffin, Jr.; Diehl; Khaled | Ben Billions | 3:25 |
| 8. | "Hollywood Interlude" | Balshe; Schofield; Muñoz; Al-Majed | Belly; DannyBoyStyles; The ANMLS | 3:10 |
| 9. | "Seven Day Love" (featuring Ashanti) | Balshe; Ashanti Douglas; Diehl; Rodriguez-Diaz; Khaled | Belly; Ben Billions; Infamous | 3:16 |
| 10. | "Actin' Different" | Balshe; Schofield; Bryant; T. Gomringer; K. Gomringer | DannyBoyStyles; Velous; Cubeatz | 2:37 |
| 11. | "Can't Feel a Thing" | Balshe; Schofield; Muñoz; Al-Majed; Redwood; Joseph Bostani | DannyBoyStyles; The ANMLS | 4:10 |
| Total length: | | | | 38:25 |

== Charts ==
| Chart (2016) | Peak position |
|---|---|
| US Heatseekers Albums (Billboard) | 25 |
