= Might Not =

Single by Belly featuring the Weeknd

from the album Up for Days
- Released: December 18, 2015
- Recorded: 2014
- Genre: Hip-hop; trap
- Length: 3:45
- Label: Roc Nation; XO
- Songwriters: Ahmad Balshe; Benjamin Diehl; Abel Tesfaye
- Producer: Ben Billions

Belly singles chronology
"1200" (2012)	"Might Not" (2015)	"No Option" (2015)

The Weeknd singles chronology
"Acquainted" / "In the Night" (2015)	"Might Not" (2015)	"Wonderful / Nocturnal" (2016)

Music video
- "Might Not" on YouTube

"Might Not" is a song by the Canadian rapper Belly featuring singer-songwriter the Weeknd. The song was released on December 18, 2015, through Roc Nation and XO as the only single from the former's mixtape Up for Days. Written alongside producer Ben Billions, it reached number 68 on the US Billboard Hot 100. The official remix features new material from the American rappers 2 Chainz and Yo Gotti.

== Music video ==
The music video for "Might Not" premiered the same day as the song's release on Belly's Vevo account on YouTube. It was directed by Shomi Patwary and Belly, and has received over 79 million views on YouTube as of February 2024. The video includes the two artists, who are attempting to navigate a party while highly intoxicated. Throughout the video, a warbling distortion is present, along with what The Fader describes as a "disassociated" look on the artists' faces.

== Commercial performance ==
"Might Not" peaked at number 68 on the Billboard Hot 100 on the date ending April 30, 2016, making it his highest entry on the chart as the leading artist. The single was certified Platinum by the Recording Industry Association of America (RIAA) for combined sales and streaming equivalent units of over 1,000,000 units in the United States.

== Charts ==
Chart (2016)	Peak position
Belgium (Ultratop 50 Wallonia)	7
Canada Hot 100 (Billboard)	28
Canada CHR/Top 40 (Billboard)	4
US Billboard Hot 100	68
US Hot R&B/Hip-Hop Songs (Billboard)	21
US Pop Airplay (Billboard)	40
US R&B/Hip-Hop Airplay (Billboard)	34
US Rhythmic Airplay (Billboard)	1

=== Year-end charts ===
Chart (2016)	Position
Canada (Canadian Hot 100)	93
US Hot R&B/Hip-Hop Songs (Billboard)	69
US Rhythmic (Billboard)	11

== Certifications ==
Region	Certification	Certified units/sales
Canada (Music Canada)	3× Platinum	240,000^{‡}
United States (RIAA)	Platinum	1,000,000^{‡}
^{‡} Sales+streaming figures based on certification alone.

== See also ==
- List of Billboard Rhythmic number-one songs of the 2010s
