= La Mar Taylor =

Canadian artist and creative director for the Weeknd

- Born: La Mar C. Taylor; September 17, 1990 (age 35); Scarborough, Ontario, Canada
- Education: Birchmount Park Collegiate Institute
- Occupations: Artist; creative director; entrepreneur
- Years active: 2011–present
- Known for: Creative director for The Weeknd; co-founder of XO Records and HXOUSE
- Notable work: Creative direction for House of Balloons, Thursday and Echoes of Silence

La Mar C. Taylor (born September 17, 1990) is a Canadian artist, creative director, and entrepreneur. He is the co-founder of XO Records, and the creative director for the label's primary artist, singer the Weeknd. He is also the co-founder of the incubator HXOUSE. He was first recognized for creating the cover for the Weeknd's debut mixtape, House of Balloons, in 2011.

== Early life and education ==
La Mar C. Taylor was born on September 17, 1990, in Scarborough, Ontario, Canada, and was raised by his mother. He is of Jamaican descent. He attended Birchmount Park Collegiate Institute, where he met Abel "The Weeknd" Tesfaye. He dropped out of high school in 2007, and moved to Parkdale, Toronto.

== Career ==
Taylor started his career by taking up creative video projects for Tesfaye. In 2011, he created the cover for House of Balloons, by calling in his ex-girlfriend and sneaking into the Ontario College of Art & Design University to gain access to the school's Adobe software. He also took charge of creating artistic and visual aspects for the Weeknd's other new projects, Thursday and Echoes of Silence, all of which were released under, XO, where Taylor serves as creative director. He also manages marketing and branding for Tesfaye, including album artwork and merchandise, and oversees live shows for the singer. His professional relationship with Tesfaye put him on the Forbes 30 Under 30 list for Music in 2017 and Billboard Canada 40 Under 40 Visionary in 2025.

In 2018, Taylor co-founded the incubator, HXOUSE (pronounced "house") with Ahmed Ishmail. Tesfaye is a sleeping partner at the company. The facility is a 30,000-square-foot space located near Toronto's waterfront which provides studio rooms and offers equipment needed for recording, designing, and producing at a low cost for young artists.

== Personal life ==
Tesfaye is Taylor's best friend. When the two first met in high school during a business class, they immediately bonded over their love for music and creative photography. Tesfaye successfully convinced Taylor to drop out of school with him in 2007.
