= DannyBoyStyles =

- Born: Daniel Schofield; Miami, Florida
- Occupations: Record producer; Songwriter; Engineer; Composer
- Years active: 2007–present
- Labels: Universal Publishing; SAL&CO
- Website: dannyboystyles.com

Danny Schofield, known professionally as DannyBoyStyles (and previously known as Styles), is an American Grammy award-winning record producer, engineer, songwriter, and composer. He produced all ten tracks on the Weeknd's album Kiss Land and won a Grammy for his work on the Weeknd's follow-up, Beauty Behind the Madness.

== Early life and career ==
Schofield was born and raised in Miami, Florida. His first hit as a producer was "This Is Why I'm Hot" for Mims in 2007, which would go on to peak at #1 on the Billboard Hot 100. He also produced most of the other songs on Mims' Music Is My Savior album as part of DJ Blackout's Blackout Movement. In 2010, he co-wrote "Blow Ya’ Mind," along with top songwriter Larry Nacht, Winston Thomas, Safaree Samuels and artist Nicki Minaj, for Minaj’s debut album, Pink Friday, which music reviewer Pitchfork called "among the best [songs] on the record." A few years later, he was introduced to Amir "Cash" Esmailian and Tony Sal, co-managers to the Weeknd and Canadian rapper Belly. He would go on to produce all 10 tracks on the Weeknd's debut studio album Kiss Land which was released in September 2013. He won his first Grammy for his work on the Weeknd's Beauty Behind the Madness which included production and songwriting work on "Often", "Acquainted", and "Angel."

In October 2013, he joined Ben Billions and Belly to co-write "6 Inch" for Beyoncé featuring the Weeknd. The song would eventually appear on Lemonade which was nominated for Album of the Year at the 2017 Grammy Awards and won for Best Urban Contemporary Album. DannyBoyStyles is also a frequent collaborator with The Weeknd and Belly and has produced or written songs for a variety of artists including French Montana, NAV, and Juicy J.

== Songwriting and production discography ==
=== Albums ===
Selected albums with production and songwriting credits
Year	Album	Artist	Role	Notes
2007	Music Is My Savior	Mims	Co-producer (as member of the BlackOut Movement)	US #4
2013	Kiss Land	The Weeknd	Co-producer	US #2
2015	Up For Days	Belly	Co-producer	
2016	Another Day in Paradise	Belly	Co-producer	
2016	Inzombia	Belly	Co-producer	
2017	Mumble Rap	Belly	Executive producer	CAN #55
2017	Evolution Pt. 1	Prince Charlez	Executive producer	

=== Songs ===
Selected songs with production and songwriting credits
Year	Song name	Primary artist(s)	Album	Role	Notes
2007	"This Is Why I'm Hot"	Mims	Music Is My Savior	Co-producer (as member of the BlackOut Movement)	US #1
2009	"There He Go"	Fabolous	Loso's Way	Co-writer	
2010	"Blow Ya Mind"	Nicki Minaj	Pink Friday	Co-writer	
2013	"One of Those Nights"	Juicy J (feat. The Weeknd)	Stay Trippy	Co-producer	
2013	"Live For"	The Weeknd (feat. Drake)	Kiss Land	Co-producer	US RB/HH #47
2013	"Wanderlust"	The Weeknd	Kiss Land	Co-producer	CAN #45
2013	"Kiss Land"	The Weeknd	Kiss Land	Co-producer	
2013	"Gifted"	French Montana (feat. The Weeknd)	Excuse My French	Producer, co-writer	
2013	"When I Want"	French Montana	Excuse My French	Producer, co-writer	
2015	"To Each His Own (The Outro)"	French Montana	Casino Life 2	Producer	
2015	"Pullin' Up"	Meek Mill (feat. The Weeknd)	Dreams Worth More Than Money	Co-producer	
2015	"As You Are"	The Weeknd	Beauty Behind the Madness	Co-producer	
2015	"Angel"	The Weeknd	Beauty Behind the Madness	Co-producer	
2015	"Often"	The Weeknd	Beauty Behind the Madness	Co-producer	US #59
2015	"Acquainted"	The Weeknd	Beauty Behind the Madness	Co-producer	US #60
2015	"Dealer Plated"	Belly (feat. French Montana)	Up For Days	Co-producer	
2015	"Love Kills"	Belly (feat. Juelz Santana)	Up For Days	Co-producer	
2015	"Poltergeist"	Belly	Up For Days	Producer	
2016	"War Pain"	Meek Mill	4/4 Part 2	Co-producer	
2016	"6 Inch"	Beyoncé (feat. The Weeknd)	Lemonade	Co-producer	US #18
2016	"Judas"	BANKS	The Altar	Co-producer	
2016	"27 Hours"	BANKS	The Altar	Co-producer	
2016	"Ready (Intro)"	French Montana	MC4	Co-producer	Co-writer
2016	"Does It Feel"	Charlie Puth	MC4	Co-producer	Nine Track Mind
2016	"It's All Love"	Belly (feat. Starrah)	Another Day in Paradise	Co-writer, co-producer	
2016	"Favorite Color"	Belly	Another Day in Paradise	Co-writer, co-producer	
2016	"Another Day in Paradise"	Belly	Another Day in Paradise	Co-writer, producer	
2016	"Die Alone"	Belly	InZombia	Co-writer, co-producer	
2016	"The Day I Met You"	Belly	InZombia	Co-writer, co-producer	
2016	"Consuela"	Belly (feat. Young Thug)	InZombia	Co-writer, co-producer	
2016	"Hollywood (Interlude)"	Belly	InZombia	Co-writer, co-producer	
2016	"Actin' Different"	Belly	InZombia	Co-writer, co-producer	
2016	"Can't Feel a Thing"	Belly	InZombia	Co-writer, co-producer	
2017	"Nav"	Kodak Black	Nav	Nav	Co-producer
2017	"Coolin and Booted"	Kodak Black	Painting Pictures		Co-producer
2017	"So Good"	Kodak Black	So Good	UK #44	Co-producer
2017	"Pull a Caper"	DJ Khaled (feat. Kodak Black, Gucci Mane, and Rick Ross)	Grateful		Co-producer
2017	"A Lie"	French Montana (feat. The Weeknd and Max B)	Jungle Rules	US #75	Co-producer
2017	"I Am"	Nav and Metro Boomin	Perfect Timing		Co-producer
2017	"Angel"	Tokio Myers	Our Generation	Co-writer	
2017	"Love A Loser"	Cassie (feat. G-Eazy)	Non-album single	Co-producer	
2017	"Back Around"	Prince Charlez	Evolution Pt. 1	Co-writer, producer	
2017	"Can I"	Prince Charlez	Evolution Pt. 1	Co-writer, producer	
2017	"Tear It Down"	Prince Charlez	Evolution Pt. 1	Co-writer, producer	
2017	"Make a Toast"	Belly	Mumble Rap	Co-writer, co-producer	
2017	"The Come Down Is Real Too"	Belly	Mumble Rap	Co-writer	
2017	"Mumble Rap"	Belly	Mumble Rap	Co-writer, producer	
2017	"Papyrus"	Belly	Mumble Rap	Co-writer, producer	
2017	"Alcantara"	Belly (feat. Pusha T)	Mumble Rap	Co-writer	
2018	"Reckless"	Nav	Reckless	Co-writer, producer	
2018	"Never Change"	Nav	Reckless	Co-writer, producer	
2018	"Glow Up"	Nav	Reckless	Co-writer, producer	
2018	"Just Happened"	Nav	Reckless	Co-writer, producer	
2021	"Poison"	Aaliyah feat. The Weeknd	Unstoppable	Co-producer	
