= Belly (rapper) =

Palestinian-Canadian rapper (born 1984)

Belly أحمد بلشي
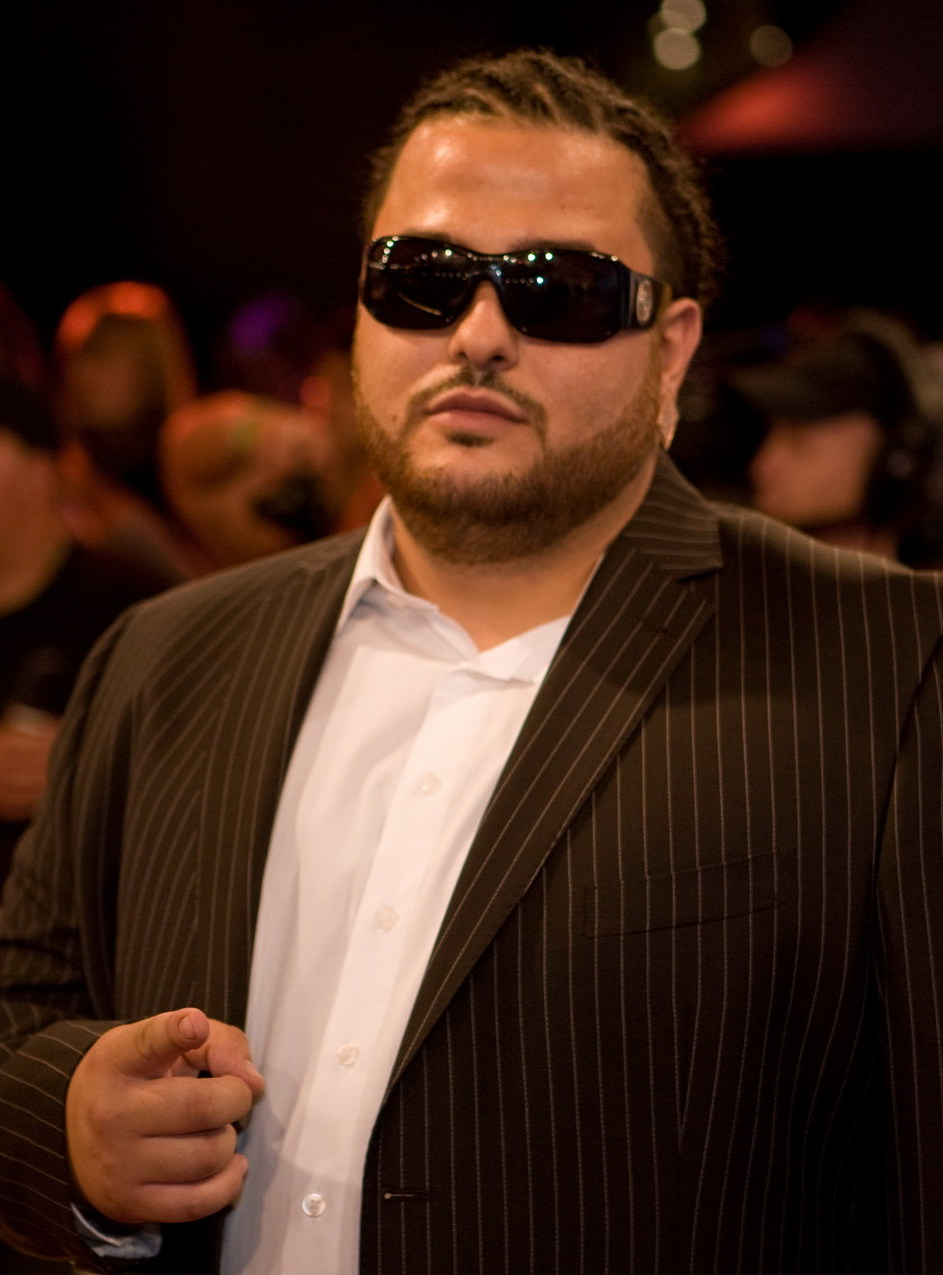
- Belly in 2008

Background information
- Born: Ahmad Balshe; 7 April 1984 (age 42); Jenin, Palestine
- Origin: Ottawa, Ontario, Canada
- Genres: Alternative hip-hop; trap; alternative R&B
- Occupations: Rapper; singer; songwriter; record producer
- Years active: 2005–present
- Labels: XO; Roc Nation; Republic; Capital Prophets
- Spouse: Dina Rabadi (m. 2023)

Ahmad Balshe (Arabic: أحمد بلشي; born 7 April 1984), known professionally as Belly, is a Palestinian-Canadian rapper, singer, songwriter, and record producer. Born in Jenin, Balshe was raised in Ottawa. His debut mixtape, Death Before Dishonor: Vol. 1 (2005) was followed by eight additional projects until the release of his debut studio album, The Revolution (2007). He then began co-writing for fellow Canadian singer the Weeknd, signing with his record label, XO, as a recording artist in 2015.

Released in a joint venture with Roc Nation, his eighth mixtape, Up for Days (2015), marked his first release on a major label and was led by the single "Might Not" (featuring the Weeknd) — his first entry on both Canadian Hot 100 and Billboard Hot 100 which received double platinum and platinum certifications by Music Canada (MC) and the Recording Industry Association of America (RIAA), respectively. His second studio album, Immigrant (2018), narrowly entered the Billboard 200 along with his third, See You Next Wednesday (2021). His fourth album, 96 Miles from Bethlehem (2024) was released by SALXCO and explored political subject matter, namely the ongoing Israeli–Palestinian conflict.

In songwriting, Balshe has been credited on each of the Weeknd's studio albums. His first credit was on the mixtape Echoes of Silence (2011). He has also provided backing vocals and songwriting for American singer Beyoncé's 2016 song "6 Inch". He co-wrote tracks on the Weeknd's fourth studio album After Hours (2020), including its single "Blinding Lights", which became Billboard's Greatest Hot 100 Hit of All Time in 2021.

Balshe was honoured as Songwriter of the Year at the 2016 SOCAN (Society of Composers, Authors and Music Publishers of Canada) Awards for his "significant and outstanding contributions to popular music over the past year". Alongside his SOCAN award, Balshe has won a Juno Award, three MuchMusic Video Awards, and has twice attained a top chart position in the national Much Music Countdown. Balshe has collaborated frequently with fellow Palestinian DJ Khaled.

== Early life ==
Ahmad Balshe was born on 7 April 1984 in Jenin, Palestine. When he was seven years old, he moved to Ottawa, Ontario, Canada with his family, through Saudi Arabia, Lebanon, and Jordan, to escape violence and poverty.

== Career ==
=== 2007–2008: Early career and The Revolution ===
Balshe's first single, "Pressure" featuring Ginuwine, peaked at number 10 on the Canadian CHR radio charts, and number one on MuchMusic's Video chart. In April 2007, he released the video for his second single "Don't Be Shy", featuring Nina Sky, as well as the video for "History of Violence" directed by Martin Verigin and Jeffrey Hagerman. The latter remains his most controversial record to date, as he explains his views on the Israeli–Palestinian conflict and the War in Iraq.

During the 2007 NHL Playoffs, as the Ottawa Senators were competing, Belly released the single "Bandwagon", produced by Hussain Hamdan. When the Senators made the Stanley Cup Finals, he released a second version of the song which featured goaltender Ray Emery.

His debut album, The Revolution, was released on 5 June 2007. This double disc album was divided into two sections: The People and The System. The People contained more in depth songs, such as "History of Violence", "Follow Me", and "Revolutionary", where he challenges his listeners to discover the facts regarding the Middle East situation. Other songs on this disc include "People Change" and "Leave Me Alone", where he talks about his longtime friends and the memories that he kept from them. The System contained his hit singles "Ridin'", and "Pleasure".

The Revolution achieved Gold sales in Canada and won the 2008 Juno Award for Rap Recording of the Year. The singles from The Revolution won two MuchMusic Video Awards for Best Rap Video: "Pressure" in 2007 and "Ridin'" in 2008.

=== 2011–2012: Additional mixtapes and hiatus ===
In 2011, Balshe released his fifth mixtape Sleepless Nights, hosted by DJ ill Will. He also released his sixth mixtape in collaboration with rapper Kurupt entitled Belly & Kurupt The Lost Tapes 2008. The mixtape, also hosted by DJ ill Will, contained a compilation of songs the two had worked on some time after Belly's debut studio album was released. Some of the songs featured on the mixtape were previously unreleased. Belly then released his seventh mixtape The Greatest Dream I Never Had, hosted by DJ Drama.

Balshe's next project Sleepless Nights 1.5 was released in April 2012. The first single, "Hot Girl" featuring Snoop Dogg, was released on 8 September 2009. Its second single, "To The Top" featuring Ava, was released in 2010. Belly's first single of 2011 was "Back Against the Wall", featuring singer Kobe Honeycutt.

=== 2015–2016: Signing to XO and Roc Nation ===
In May 2015, after a five-year hiatus, Balshe released his eighth mixtape Up for Days. It was his first project to be released under the record labels XO and Roc Nation and featured guest appearances by Travis Scott, Juelz Santana, French Montana and the Weeknd. Belly was also prominently featured on the Weeknd's sophomore album Beauty Behind the Madness in August 2015, earning writing credits on six of the fourteen songs: "Often", "The Hills", "Shameless", "Earned It", "In the Night" and "As You Are". On 24 November 2015, Belly formally signed to Roc Nation.

In February 2016, Balshe released the single "Zanzibar", featuring Juicy J. On 27 May, he released his ninth mixtape Another Day in Paradise, which featured guest appearances by Travis Scott, Lil Wayne, Kehlani, Starrah, Waka Flocka, Juicy J and B-Real. On 11 November, he released his tenth mixtape Inzombia. It featured guest appearances from Young Thug, Zack, Nav, Future, Ty Dolla $ign, Jadakiss and Ashanti. The mixtape was supported by two singles; "Consuela" and "The Day I Met You". Later that month, the Weeknd released his third studio album Starboy, with Belly earning writing credits on nine of the eighteen songs: "Party Monster", "False Alarm", "Rockin'", "Six Feet Under", "Love to Lay", "A Lonely Night", "Ordinary Life", "Nothing Without You" and "All I Know".

=== 2017–2018: Mumble Rap and Immigrant ===
On 23 June 2017, Balshe was featured on DJ Khaled's tenth studio album Grateful on the song "Interlude". On 6 October, he released his eleventh mixtape Mumble Rap, which was executive produced by Boi-1da. On 8 December, he was featured on Juicy J's fourth studio album Rubba Band Business on the song "On & On", which also featured Tory Lanez.

Balshe featured in Toronto's Canada Day celebrations at Nathan Phillips Square, where he received criticism for his profanity-laden performance. Belly was unapologetic, and sent out tweets denouncing censorship around his music, saying organizers were aware his performance would contain profanities.

On 23 March 2018, Balshe released the single "4 Days", featuring rapper YG and producer DJ Mustard. The song's music video was released three days later. He then released the single "Maintain" featuring Nav on 6 April, followed by the single "What You Want" featuring the Weeknd, which was released on 24 May. Both singles appeared on his second studio album, Immigrant, which was released on 12 October. The album also features guest appearances from Zack, French Montana, Meek Mill, Yo Gotti, and M.I.A.

=== 2021: See You Next Wednesday ===
On 7 April 2021, Balshe released the dual lead singles from his third studio album, See You Next Wednesday, "Money on the Table" featuring Benny the Butcher and "IYKYK". He then released the second single, "Zero Love" featuring Moneybagg Yo, on 3 June. On 22 July, he released the third single "Better Believe", a collaboration with the Weeknd and Young Thug. The song debuted on the US Billboard Hot 100 chart at number 88. On 18 August, Belly revealed the album artwork and tracklist, and announced the release date of 27 August. The album also features guest appearances from Nav, Nas, Gunna, Big Sean, Lil Uzi Vert, and PnB Rock. On 17 December 2021, a new posthumous single from Aaliyah was released, titled "Poison" featuring the Weeknd, in which Belly co-wrote the song, which contains vocals recorded by Aaliyah shortly before her death in 2001.

=== 2023: Mumble Rap 2 ===
On 21 April 2023, Balshe released the first single from his twelfth mixtape, Mumble Rap 2, "American Nightmare", his first release after taking a hiatus all of 2022. He then released the second single, "Ambiance" on 5 May. The mixtape was released on 19 May and features guest appearances from Nav, Rick Ross, Gucci Mane, and the late Gil Scott-Heron, while it was primarily produced by Hit-Boy.

=== 2024: 96 Miles From Bethlehem ===
On 30 May 2024, Balshe released his fourth studio album, 96 Miles from Bethlehem. The rapper described the nine-song album as being about “the gift, curse, and fate of being Palestinian” .The album feature some Arabic lyrics and melodies as well as guest appearances from Elyanna, Saint Levant, and MC Abdul , as well as production contributions from DaHeala. Balshe pledged to donate the album proceeds to Gaza, the west bank and other areas effected by the war in Palestine.

== Personal life ==
On 30 July 2019, Balshe filed a lawsuit against Coachella Music LLC, Goldenvoice LLC, and IPS Security Incorporated alleging assault and battery, negligence, and emotional distress in response to an incident which occurred during the 2018 Coachella Music Festival. A video obtained by TMZ shows festival security staff pushing Balshe up against a security barrier and repeatedly punching him.

On 31 May 2021, Balshe announced his engagement to resident doctor and businesswoman Dina Rabadi. They married on 9 September 2023 in an intimate Catholic ceremony at Mission Santa Barbara, followed by a larger ceremony held in Montecito, California.

== Discography ==
=== Studio albums ===
- The Revolution (2007)
- Immigrant (2018)
- See You Next Wednesday (2021)
- 96 Miles from Bethlehem (2024)

== Awards and nominations ==
=== Academy Awards ===
Year	Nominated work	Category	Result	Ref(s)
2016	"Earned It"	Best Original Song	Nominated	

=== Black Reel Awards ===
Year	Nominated work	Category	Result	Ref(s)
2016	"Earned It"	Outstanding Original Song	Nominated	

=== Grammy Awards ===
Year	Nominated work	Category	Result	Ref(s)
2016	"Earned It"	Best R&B Song	Nominated	
2016	"Earned It"	Best Song Written for Visual Media	Nominated	

=== iHeartRadio Music Awards ===
Year	Nominated work	Category	Result	Ref(s)
2016	"Earned It"	Best Song from a Movie	Nominated	

=== Juno Award ===
Year	Nominated work	Category	Result	Ref(s)
2008	Himself	New Artist of the Year	Nominated	
2008	"The Revolution"	Rap Recording of the Year	Won	
2016	Himself	Songwriter of the Year	Won	
2017	Himself	Fan Choice Award	Nominated	
2017	"Another Day in Paradise"	Rap Recording of the Year	Nominated	
2018	Mumble Rap	Rap Recording of the Year	Nominated	
2019	Immigrant	Rap Recording of the Year	Nominated	
2021	"After Hours", "Blinding Lights", "Save Your Tears" (with Abel "The Weeknd" Tesfaye and Jason "DaHeala" Quenneville)	Songwriter of the Year	Won	

=== SOCAN Songwriting Prize ===
Year	Nominated work	Category	Result	Ref(s)
2015	"Wanderlust"	Urban/Independent Music	Won	
2016	Himself	Songwriter of the Year	Won	
2016	"The Hills"	International Song	Won	
2016	"The Hills"	Pop/Rock Music	Won	
2016	"Earned It"	Pop/Rock Music	Won	
2017	"Might Not"	Urban Music	Won	
