= XO (record label) =

Canadian record label founded by the Weeknd

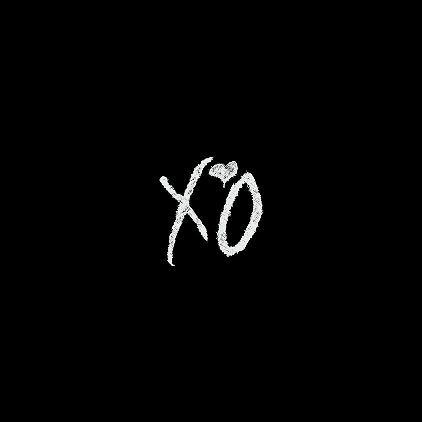
- Parent company: Universal Music Group
- Founded: 2011; 15 years ago
- Founder: The Weeknd; Wassim Slaiby; Amir Esmailian; La Mar Taylor
- Status: Active
- Distributor: Republic Records
- Genre: R&B; hip hop
- Country of origin: Canada
- Location: Toronto, Ontario
- Official website: xo.store

XO (also known as XO Records) is a Canadian record label founded by singer the Weeknd, his managers Wassim Slaiby and Amir "Cash" Esmailian, and his creative director La Mar Taylor. Slaiby also is the CEO. As of 2012, it operates as a subsidiary of Universal Music Group, and is distributed through Republic Records.

The label's current acts include the Weeknd, Belly, Nav and Chxrry. The label has had seven projects debut at number one on the Billboard 200: Beauty Behind the Madness, Starboy, My Dear Melancholy, Bad Habits, After Hours, Good Intentions and Hurry Up Tomorrow.

== History ==
In 2011, the Weeknd, Wassim Slaiby, Amir Esmailian and La Mar Taylor founded XO as an unofficial imprint to release the Weeknd's three mixtapes; House of Balloons, Thursday, and Echoes of Silence. The mixtapes earned the Weeknd a following and recognition from mainstream publications, and helped grow the record label's reputation through various performances, song references and business ventures.

The meaning of "XO" stands for ecstasy and oxycontin. During the Weeknd's early uprising of his career, he would occasionally record music under the influence of drugs, stating, "There were songs on my first record that were seven minutes long."

When the Weeknd signed with Republic Records in 2012, XO was assumed as a subsidiary label. In 2015, rappers Belly and Derek Wise were signed to XO. In 2016, rapper Nav joined the label's roster. XO signed hip hop duo 88Glam in 2017, following the independent release of their mixtape 88Glam. The duo left the label in 2020. Singer Black Atlass joined in 2018, he left the label in 2022. Singer Chxrry joined in 2022, becoming the first female artist signed to XO.

On June 6, 2018, the Weeknd announced his new radio show Memento Mori run by the label on Apple Music 1. The first show aired on June 8, 2018, where the Weeknd would play a mixture of songs that have influenced him in the music scene. Often, he would invite his fellow XO members as well for other musicians as guests to host their own episodes in the scene to share their own taste in music. Each episode is run in the span of 2–3 hours.

== Roster ==
=== Current acts ===
Act	Year signed	Releases under the label
The Weeknd	Founder	12
Belly	2015	7
Nav	2016	7
Chxrry	2022	3

=== Former acts ===
Act	Year signed	Releases under the label
88Glam	2017–2020	2
Black Atlass	2018–2022	2

=== In-house producers ===
Act	Year
Illangelo	2011
DaHeala	2013
DannyBoyStyles	2013
Belly	2013
Prince85	2013
Nav	2016

== Discography ==
XO has officially released seventeen studio albums, four EPs, and four compilation albums (including two greatest hits albums). Unofficially, the label has released thirteen mixtapes.

=== Studio albums ===
Year	Album details	Details
2013	The Weeknd – Kiss Land: Released: September 10, 2013; Label: XO, Republic; Formats: CD, vinyl, download	Chart position: #2 U.S.; RIAA certification: Gold
2015	The Weeknd – Beauty Behind the Madness: Released: August 28, 2015; Label: XO, Republic; Formats: CD, vinyl, download	Chart position: #1 U.S.; RIAA certification: 4× Platinum
2016	The Weeknd – Starboy: Released: November 25, 2016; Label: XO, Republic; Formats: CD, vinyl, download	Chart position: #1 U.S.; RIAA certification: 3× Platinum
2018	Nav – Reckless: Released: May 18, 2018; Label: XO, Republic; Formats: CD, download	Chart position: #8 U.S.; RIAA certification: Gold
2018	Black Atlass – Pain and Pleasure: Released: July 12, 2018; Label: XO, Republic; Formats: download	Chart position: uncharted; RIAA certification: uncertified
2018	Belly – Immigrant: Released: October 12, 2018; Label: XO, Roc Nation, Republic; Formats: CD, download	Chart position: #169 U.S.; RIAA certification: uncertified
2018	88Glam – 88Glam2: Released: November 16, 2018 (initial) April 5, 2019 (2.5); Label: XO, Republic; Formats: download	Chart position: uncharted; RIAA certification: uncertified
2019	Nav – Bad Habits: Released: March 22, 2019; Label: XO, Republic; Formats: CD, vinyl, download	Chart position: #1 U.S.; RIAA certification: Gold
2020	The Weeknd – After Hours: Released: March 20, 2020; Label: XO, Republic; Formats: CD, vinyl, cassette, download	Chart position: #1 U.S.; RIAA certification: 2× platinum
2020	88Glam – Close to Heaven Far from God: Released: April 17, 2020; Label: XO, Republic; Formats: download	Cancelled, was released independently after leaving the label
2020	Black Atlass – Dream Awake: Released: April 3, 2020; Label: XO, Republic; Formats: download	Chart position: uncharted; RIAA certification: uncertified
2020	Nav – Good Intentions: Released: May 8, 2020; Label: XO, Republic; Formats: CD, vinyl, cassette, download	Chart position: #1 U.S.; RIAA certification: uncertified
2021	Belly – See You Next Wednesday: Released: August 27, 2021; Label: XO, Roc Nation; Formats: download	Chart position: #191 U.S.; RIAA certification: uncertified
2022	The Weeknd – Dawn FM: Released: January 7, 2022; Label: XO, Republic; Formats: CD, vinyl, cassette, download	Chart position: #2 U.S.; RIAA certification: platinum
2022	Nav – Demons Protected by Angels: Released: September 9, 2022; Label: XO, Republic; Format: CD, download	Chart position: #2 U.S.; RIAA certification: uncertified
2025	The Weeknd – Hurry Up Tomorrow: Released: January 31, 2025; Label: XO, Republic; Formats: CD, vinyl, cassette, download	Chart position: #1 U.S.; RIAA certification: TBA
2026	Chxrry – U, Me & My Ego: Released: May 29th, 2026; Label: XO, Republic; Format: Digital download	Chart position: uncharted; RIAA certification: uncertified

=== EPs ===
Year	EP details	Details
2018	The Weeknd – My Dear Melancholy, Released: March 29, 2018; Label: XO, Republic; Formats: CD, download	Chart position: #1 U.S.; RIAA certification: uncertified
2019	Nav – Brown Boy: Released: March 14, 2019; Label: XO, Republic; Format: Digital download	Chart position: uncharted; RIAA certification: uncertified
2022	Chxrry22 – The Other Side: Released: September 28, 2022; Label: XO, Republic; Format: Digital download	Chart position: uncharted; RIAA certification: uncertified
2023	Chxrry22 – Siren: Released: October 27, 2023; Label: XO, Republic; Format: Digital download	Chart position: uncharted; RIAA certification: uncertified

=== Compilation albums ===
Year	Album details	Details
2012	The Weeknd – Trilogy: Released: November 13, 2012; Label: XO, Republic; Formats: CD, download	Chart position: #4 U.S.; RIAA certification: 3× Platinum
2018	The Weeknd – The Weeknd in Japan: Released: November 21, 2018 (Japan); Label: XO, Republic, Universal Music Japan; Formats: CD, download	Chart position: uncharted; RIAA certification: uncertified
2021	The Weeknd – The Highlights: Released: February 5, 2021; Label: XO, Republic; Formats: CD, download	Chart position: #2 US; RIAA certification: uncertified
2023	The Weeknd – Live at SoFi Stadium: Released: March 3, 2023; Label: XO, Republic; Formats: download	Chart position: uncertified; RIAA certification: uncertified

=== Mixtapes ===
Year	Mixtape details
2011	The Weeknd – House of Balloons: Released: March 21, 2011; Label: XO; Formats: download
2011	The Weeknd – Thursday: Released: August 18, 2011; Label: XO; Formats: download
2011	The Weeknd – Echoes of Silence: Released: December 21, 2011; Label: XO; Formats: download
2015	Belly – Up For Days: Released: May 7, 2015; Label: XO, Roc Nation; Formats: download
2016	Belly – Another Day in Paradise: Released: May 27, 2016; Label: XO, Roc Nation; Formats: download
2016	Belly – Inzombia: Released: November 11, 2016; Label: XO, Roc Nation; Formats: download
2017	Nav – Nav: Released: February 24, 2017; Label: XO, Republic; Formats: download
2017	Nav and Metro Boomin – Perfect Timing: Released: July 21, 2017; Label: Boominati, XO, Republic; Formats: download
2017	Belly – Mumble Rap: Released: October 6, 2017; Label: XO, Roc Nation; Formats: download
2017	88Glam – 88Glam: Released: November 16, 2017 (initial) April 20, 2018 (re-released); Label: Self-released (initial) XO, Republic (re-released); Formats: download
2020	Nav – Brown Boy 2: Released: May 11, 2020; Label: XO, Republic; Formats: download
2020	Nav – Emergency Tsunami: Released: November 6, 2020; Label: XO, Republic; Formats: download
2023	Belly – Mumble Rap 2: Released: May 19, 2023; Label: XO, Roc Nation; Formats: download
