= Soundset Music Festival =

Hip-hop music festival held yearly in the Minneapolis-Saint Paul area

Soundset Music Festival was a hip-hop music festival held yearly in the Minneapolis-Saint Paul area over Memorial Day weekend. Soundset began in the Metrodome parking lot in 2008, with attendance growing from 12,000 to over 30,000 by 2014. Over its history, it was attended by more than 280,000 fans from fifty U.S. states, Canada, Mexico, Puerto Rico, Costa Rica, Africa, Europe, Asia, South America, Australia, and New Zealand.

Rhymesayers Entertainment artists were the foundation of Soundset, with Atmosphere performing every year of the festival until its final year in 2019. Between 2008 and 2019, over 400 different performers performed at the festival.

Soundset cancelled its concert in 2020 to "assess what Soundset will become in the new decade". This was announced before the official start of the COVID-19 pandemic, though the effects of the pandemic prevented further instances of the festival after 2019. In the following year, Soundset Music Festival announced that it would not return after the pandemic, becoming one of a number of Minneapolis-based music festivals permanently discontinued in the aftermath of COVID-19.

== Origin ==
Two years after Rhymesayers Entertainment was first founded, they hosted an event with over three dozen local underground emcees, DJs, and b-boys in a South Minneapolis warehouse. Two years later, the event became Soundset Wednesdays at First Avenue. In 2008, Soundset emerged in the Metrodome parking lot.

== 2019 lineup ==
Lil Wayne, SZA, G-Eazy, Run the Jewels, Atmosphere, Black Star, Beast Coast, Tech N9ne, DMX, Royce da 5'9", Dessa, DJ Spinderella, Doja Cat, Just Blaze, Bas, Prof, Lil Nas X, DaBaby, Cut Chemist, Buddy, Dem Atlas, Dounia, DJ Abilities, Taylor Bennett, DJ, YBN Cordae, DV One, Tierra Whack, Sa-Roc, Epic Beard Men, B.A.G., Taylor J, Cashinova, Student 1, Dua Saleh, Kevin Beacham, DJ Precyse, Lisa Vasequez, Psymun, Mickey Breeze, DJ Keezy, Maya MIDA

Lil Uzi Vert was on the original lineup, but did not perform.

Hosts: Sway Calloway, Heather B., J.Pratt, Cros One

== 2018 lineup ==
Logic, Migos, Atmosphere, Erykah Badu, Tyler, the Creator, Russ, Wu-Tang Clan, Brockhampton, Ice-T, A Boogie Wit Da Hoodie, Hieroglyphics, Prof, Jaden Smith, Grieves, DJ Jazzy Jeff, Murs, Young M.A., Evidence, DJ Melon, Rapsody, Westside Gunn & Conway, J.I.D, Kamaiyah, Dem Atlas, DJ Scratch, Pell, Jack Harlow, Skratch Bastid, DJ Livia, Bugus, Quincey White, The Lioness, OG Grip, Sick Trim, Willie Wonka, DJ Rowsheen, Mike 2600, DJ Bles One, Trakgirl, The Opus, MMYYKK, Bailey Cogan, DJ Ariatari, The Technics, IBrow, Booboo, Spencer Joles, Kelsey Pyro

BROCKHAMPTON was originally on the lineup but had to cancel due to allegations against their member Ameer Vann

Hosts: Sway Calloway, Heather B., J.Pratt, Cros One, Big Quarters

== 2017 lineup ==
Travi$ Scott, Atmosphere, Lauryn Hill, Gucci Mane, T.I., Pusha T, E-40, Brother Ali, DRAM, Ty Dolla $ign, P.O.S., the Stand4rd, Kool Keith(as Dr. Octagon, Aminé, Talib Kweli, Denzel Curry, Mod Sun, Pete Rock, Dave East, 070 Shake, Sa-Roc, Peanut Butter Wolf, Stretch and Bobbito, Nazeem & Spencer Joles, Oswin Benjamin, Sophia Eris, J. Plaza, rapper, horrorshow (band), Black Liquid, DJ TIIIIIIIIIP, DJ FLEG, DJ DJ Keezy, Booka B, Playboi Carti

Kevin Gates, Mac Miller, and Lil Uzi Vert were also on the original lineup, but did not perform.

Hosts: Sway Calloway, Heather B., J.Pratt, Cros One

== 2016 lineup ==
Atmosphere, ASAP Rocky, Future, The Roots, Common, Prof, Doomtree, Machine Gun Kelly, Danny Brown, Lizzo, LICE (Aesop Rock and Homeboy Sandman), Jay Rock, Post Malone, Anderson Paak and The Free Nationals, Raury, Murs and 9th Wonder, Pharoahe Monch, Mick Jenkins, GoldLink, Pouya, Crazy Legs of Rock Steady Crew, Domo Genesis, Blueprint, Marley Marl, DJ Jazzy Joyce, A-F-R-O, I Self Devine and Muja Messiah Present 9th House, Noname Gypsy, Finding Novyon, Lexii Alijai, Skeme Richards, Baby Shel & DJ Quincy James, Reverie, Jesse Da La Pena, DJ TIIIIIIIIIIP, and DJ Just Nine.

Hosts: Sway Calloway, Heather B., J.Pratt, Cros One

== 2015 lineup ==
Atmosphere, J. Cole, Ice Cube, Big Sean, Ludacris, Logic, Yelawolf, Dilated Peoples, Clockwork Indigo (Flatbush Zombies and The Underachievers), Brother Ali, Vic Mensa, Aesop Rock with Rob Sonic & DJ Abilities, Dessa, DJ Jazzy Jay, Hopsin, Smif-N-Wessun, DJ Babu, Freddie Gibbs & Madlib, Vince Staples, Watsky, DJ Eclipse, Dem Atlas, DJ Supreme, B. Dolan, Father, SonReal, G.L.A.M., Chester Watson, Sa-Roc, Sean Anonymous, Manny Phesto, Freez with DJ Willie Shu, SET THE SMITH, DJ Lean Rock, DJ Stage One, DJ Adatrak, and DJ Str8reppin.

Hosts: Sway Calloway, St. Paul Slim, J.Pratt

== 2014 lineup ==
Atmosphere, Wiz Khalifa, Nas, 2 Chainz, Cypress Hill, Earlwolf (Tyler, The Creator and Earl Sweatshirt), Chance The Rapper, Prof, Grieves, G-Eazy, Ab-Soul, DJ Qbert, The Grouch & Eligh, Flatbush Zombies, Lizzo w/ Lazerbeak, Rapsody & 9th Wonder, Shad, Dem Atlas, Snow Tha Product, Roc Marciano, Dosh, Jonwayne, D-Styles, Toki Wright & Big Cats, Will C, Allan Kingdom, Breakbeat Lou, Nacho Picasso, Freddy Fresh, Los Nativos, K. Raydio, Psynum, Mac Irv, Ecid, DJ Fundo, DJ Lean Rock, DJ D. Mil and DJ Sidereal.

Hosts: Sway Calloway, Brother Ali, J.Pratt

== 2013 lineup ==
Atmosphere, Snoop Dogg, Mac Miller, Tech N9ne, Prof (rapper), Brother Ali, Juicy J, P.O.S, Schoolboy Q, Aesop Rock with Rob Sonic & DJ Big Wiz. Joey Bada$$, Step Brothers (Evidence & Alchemist), Sean Price, A$AP Ferg, Dizzy Wright, Apollo Brown & Guilty Simpson, R.A. the Rugged Man, Abstract Rude & Musab, Melo D - Beat Junkies, Diamond D, Kid Koala, Skratch Bastid, Psalm One & Oh No, The Reminders, Mixed Blood Majority, The Chalice, Open Mike Eagle, Greg Grease, Haphduzn, Meta, Major G, DJ Top Speed, Dan Speak, Jimmy2Times, Verb X, DJ Mad Mardigan, DJ Lean Rock and Edison.

Hosts: Sway Calloway, Blueprint, J.Pratt

== 2012 lineup ==
Atmosphere, Lupe Fiasco, Ghostface Killah & Raekwon, Kendrick Lamar, Aesop Rock with Rob Sonic & Dj Big Wiz, P.O.S, Macklemore & Ryan Lewis, Grieves & Budo, Danny Brown, Big K.R.I.T., Evidence, Prof with DJ Fundo, Action Bronson, DJ Premier, I Self Devine, Astronautalis, Bambu, J-Zone (DJ set), Medusa, Chief Kamachi, Grynch, Chuuwee, Paten Locke and Willie Evans Jr. are DUMBTRON, Villa Rosa (Muja Messiah & Maria Isa), The Tribe & Big Cats, Audio Perm, Long Doe (Tony Bones, DJ Big Wiz & Mike The Martyr), Auddio Draggon (Gene Poole & Xilam Balam), Tomorrow Genius, BdotCroc, DJ Stage One, DJ Kool AKIEM, LAST WORD, KidCutUp, Superbrush427, DIVINCI (of Solillaquists of Sound), Los Boogie.

Hosted by Brother Ali, MaLLy, J Pratt.

== 2011 lineup ==
Atmosphere, Big Boi, De La Soul, Slaughterhouse (Joell Ortiz, Joe Budden, Royce da 5’9”, Crooked I), Brother Ali, Doomtree (P.O.S, Dessa, Sims, Cecil Otter, Mike Mictlan, Lazerbeak, Paper Tiger), Evidence x Rakaa-Iriscience x DJ Babu, Mac Miller, Curren$y, Blueprint, Grieves & Budo, Zion I & The Grouch, Sab The Artist, DJ Abilities, Face Candy, Edan with special guest Paten Locke, Macklemore & Ryan Lewis, Looptroop Rockers, Rubberoom, Soulcrate Music, 2Mex, Mr. Gene Poole, Qwazaar, Longshot, Mally, Desdamona, Duenday, Midwest Konnect, Rocky Diamonds, Stage One, Shortkut, Noam The Drummer, Exile, Maseo, Skeme Richards, KidCutUp and Espada.

Hosted by Toki Wright, Carnage and Kevin Beacham.

== 2010 lineup ==
Atmosphere, Method Man & Redman, Brother Ali, Hieroglyphics featuring Del the Funky Homosapien, Souls of Mischief, Casual and Pep Love, P.O.S, Murs, Freeway & Jake One, Eyedea & Abilities, Wiz Khalifa, Cage, Rob Swift, Grieves & Budo, 45 King, People Under The Stairs, BK One, DJ Revolution, Dessa, Yelawolf, Fashawn, Themselves, Busdriver, Toki Wright, Solillaquists of Sound, Prof with Rahzwell, Cecil Otter, Dark Time Sunshine, Ernest Rhodes, A.R.M (M.anifest & Krukid), Mike Dreams, I.B.E, Ice Rod, Plain Ole Bill, Mike 2600, KidCutUp, J Pratt and DJ Anton.

Hosted by Peter Parker, Kevin Beacham and DJ Snuggles.

The 2010 festival was held at Canterbury Park.

== 2009 lineup ==
Atmosphere, The Pharcyde, MF Doom, Brother Ali, Freeway & Jake One, Sage Francis with B. Dolan, Immortal Technique, P.O.S, El-P with Mr. Dibbs & TMQ, Eyedea & Abilities, Abstract Rude + Aceyalone & Myka 9 = Haiku D'Etat with DJ Drez, Prince Paul, Buck 65, Blueprint with DJ Rare Groove, DJ Nu-Mark, Heiruspecs, Cunninlynguists, Blue Scholars, Sims of Doomtree, One Be Lo, I Self Devine, Awol One, Mike Mictlan & Lazerbeak = Hand Over Fist of Doomtree, Toki Wright, Grieves, Unknown Prophets, Lil Buddy Mclain, Just.Live, Kristoff Krane, El Guante, Plain Ole Bill, BK One, King Otto, and DJ Nikoless.

== 2008 lineup ==
Atmosphere, Dilated Peoples, Aesop Rock w/ Rob Sonic and DJ Big Wiz, Little Brother, DJ Babu, Rhettmatic, J-Rocc of the World Famous Beat Junkies, Brother Ali, Eyedea & Abilities, P.O.S, Blueprint, Mac Lethal, Abstract Rude, I Self Devine, Musab, Psalm One, Grayskul, Los Nativos
