= Mourn (Corbin album) =

2017 studio album by Corbin

Studio album by Corbin
- Released: September 5, 2017
- Genre: Alternative R&B
- Length: 41:27
- Label: WeDidIt
- Producers: D33J; Shlohmo; Juice Jackal; Steven L Anderson; Against Giants

Corbin chronology
| Couch Potato (2015) | Mourn (2017) | Ghost With Skin (2021) |

Singles from Mourn
- 1. "Ice Boy" Released: July 25, 2017; 2. "Mourn" Released: August 25, 2017

Mourn is the debut studio album by the American singer and musician Corbin, released on September 5, 2017, through WeDidIt Records. It was primarily produced by D33J and Shlohmo. The album was supported by two singles, "Ice Boy" and "Mourn".

== Background and recording ==
Corbin, then known as Spooky Black, released the EP Couch Potato with Bobby Raps in 2015. He was later offered to sign with the record labels Young Turks and XL and create an album, but it ended up taking too long and the records did not fit his vision. Corbin then worked with Psymun, but it also did not come to fruition. He finally met with D33J and Shlohmo after visiting Los Angeles to meet with Doc McKinney.

== Production and composition ==
=== Overview ===
The album is primarily an alternative R&B album. A loose concept album, it follows a recluse who moves to a cabin in the woods with his lover because of the "current state of affairs in the country". He later dies in a plane crash and his lover moves back home and dies herself not long after; isolation and anger are some of the album's main themes as the narrator struggles between affection and control. Corbin was influenced by the Kate Bush song "Running Up That Hill", post-punk, new wave, and the electronic music duo Drexciya during the creation of the album. The heavier delivery of his vocals, including throaty screams, was influenced by black metal bands like Darkthrone and Hellhammer.

=== Songs ===
The album's opening track, "Ice Boy", is a synth-pop-influenced track that grows from a proclamation of love to a cry for closeness. "Revenge Song" is about giving a rapist retribution. "All Out" evolves from a synth line to a mix of loud drums and cowbells. The instruments on tracks such as "Something Safe" create an echo-like effect.

== Release and promotion ==
Corbin released the first single for the album, "Ice Boy", on July 25, 2017. He officially announced Mourn on August 25, concurrently releasing the second single "Mourn". Corbin also announced a North American tour with producers D33J and Shlohmo.

== Critical reception ==
Professional ratings
Review scores
| Source | Rating |
|---|---|
| Pitchfork | 6.8/10 |
| The Needle Drop | 7/10 |

Pat Levy of Pitchfork rated the album a 6.8/10, praising the production but noting that Corbin still needs to grow in his lyrical content. Anthony Fantano rated the album a 7/10.

== Track listing ==
All tracks are written by Corbin. All tracks are produced by D33J and Shlohmo, except where noted.

Mourn track listing
| No. | Title | Producer(s) | Length |
|---|---|---|---|
| 1. | "Ice Boy" | | 4:25 |
| 2. | "Mourn" | | 3:33 |
| 3. | "Giving Up" | | 3:57 |
| 4. | "No Title" | | 3:46 |
| 5. | "Revenge Song" | Juice Jackal; D33J; Shlohmo | 3:47 |
| 6. | "All Out" | | 4:32 |
| 7. | "Hunker Down" | Steven L Anderson; Against Giants; Shlohmo; D33J | 4:29 |
| 8. | "Something Safe" | | 4:36 |
| 9. | "The Fold Up" | | 4:11 |
| 10. | "Dragged" | | 4:06 |
| Total length: | | | 41:27 |
