= Bad Vibes =

Bad Vibes may refer to:

- Bad Vibes (song), a song by Ayra Starr featuring Seyi Vibez
- Mala onda, a 1991 novel by Alberto Fuguet
- Bad Vibes (Lloyd Cole album), 1993
- Bad Vibes (Shlohmo album), 2011
- Bad Vibes, a studio album by Shit and Shine
- "Bad Vibes" (K.Flay song)

== See also ==
- "Bad Vibe", a 2018 song by English group M.O with Lotto Boyz and Mr Eazi
