= That's My Bitch =

That's My Bitch may refer to:

- "D.M.B.", short for "Dat's My Bitch", a song by ASAP Rocky
- "That's My Bitch", a song by City Girls from the 2020 album City on Lock
- "That's My Bitch", a song by Jay-Z and Kanye West from the 2011 album Watch the Throne
- "That's My Bitch", a song by Lil Mosey from the 2018 album Northsbest
