= Of Earth & Wires =

Studio album by Dua Saleh
- Released: May 15, 2026
- Genres: Pop; R&B
- Length: 26:15
- Label: Ghostly International
- Producers: Ethan Hansen; Billy Lemos; Miño; Jeremy Nutzman; Ryan Olson; Psymun; Phil Simmonds; Toulouse; Justin Vernon

Dua Saleh chronology
I Should Call Them (2024)	Of Earth & Wires (2026)

Singles from Of Earth & Wires
- 1. "Flood" Released: February 3, 2026; 2. "Glow" Released: February 3, 2026; 3. "I Do, I Do" Released: March 12, 2026

Of Earth & Wires is the second studio album by the American musician Dua Saleh. It was released on May 15, 2026, through Ghostly International. Executive produced by Billy Lemos, the album follows Saleh's 2024 debut album I Should Call Them and features guest appearances from Bon Iver, Gaidaa, and Aja Monet.

The album was written around themes of climate anxiety, technological collapse, war, grief, home, and human connection. Reviewers described its music as drawing from pop, R&B, electronic pop, indie rock, folk, club music, and Sudanese musical references. It received generally favorable reviews from critics, with several reviewers emphasizing its genre shifts and ecological and technological themes.

== Background and recording ==
Saleh released their first studio album, I Should Call Them, through Ghostly International in 2024. In Pitchfork, Nia Coats linked Of Earth & Wires to that album's imagined future while describing the newer record as wider in scope than its predecessor's central love story. Saleh worked with Lemos and several other producers while based in the Midwest, and the album also grew from material written while Saleh was filming the television series Sex Education in Wales.

Saleh said that some early sessions produced several songs in a short period, at a time when the war in Sudan, artificial intelligence, and a general feeling of crisis shaped the album's development. In a statement quoted by the Line of Best Fit, Saleh said the songs grew from music made with Bon Iver and producers from Minnesota, where Saleh grew up, while they were thinking about artificial intelligence, war, loneliness, family separation, and the idea of home. Bandcamp's album notes also connect the record to Saleh's reflections on war, family separation, and home.

In an interview with DIY, Saleh described Of Earth & Wires as part of a romantic-apocalyptic trilogy and said the album was shaped by ecological disasters, including flooding in Wales and Los Angeles wildfires, as well as the proliferation of artificial intelligence and its use in warfare. Saleh also said the record often places organic instruments against digital elements, and connected the hopeful ending of "All Is Love" to the community response they observed after the Los Angeles fires.

== Music and themes ==
Of Earth & Wires combines pop and R&B with electronic pop, indie rock, club music, and folk elements. Reviewers connected the album's genre shifts with its concerns about conflict, climate instability, artificial intelligence, and identity. In NME, Cyclone Wehner described the record as an art-pop and progressive-R&B album that keeps Saleh's experimental approach while placing greater emphasis on pop songwriting. The Guardian described "5 Days" as moving through spoken-word poetry, rap, falsetto vocals, and acoustic guitar, and described "I Do, I Do" as a synth-pop track with oud. Beats Per Minute discussed R&B, electronic production, drum and bass, and Sudanese folk references in its review.

Several songs connect environmental imagery with personal relationships and diaspora. Pitchfork wrote that "5 Days" begins as a folk lament before turning into a distorted protest, and that "Flood" links technological advancement, dystopian imagery, and Saleh's experience of climate-related flooding in Wales. Writing in the Guardian, Katie Hawthorne described "5 Days" as a mix of spoken-word poetry, rap, falsetto vocals, and acoustic guitar, while calling "I Do, I Do" a synth-pop track with oud and a Sudanese proverb. Daisy Carter of DIY wrote that "5 Days" introduced the album's contrast between acoustic and digital textures, while "Cállate" and "Firestorm" used drum and bass and 2000s R&B references.

Justin Vernon of Bon Iver appears on "Flood", "Keep Away", and "Glow". Pitchfork wrote that Vernon sings on all three tracks and described his voice as a complement to Saleh's falsetto. The album closes with "All Is Love", which features a spoken-word contribution by Aja Monet.

== Release and promotion ==
Of Earth & Wires was announced on February 3, 2026, alongside the songs "Flood" and "Glow", both featuring Bon Iver. Pitchfork reported that the album would be released on May 15 through Ghostly International and that Lemos executive-produced the record. The announcement also listed Gaidaa and Aja Monet among the album's featured artists. "Flood" and "Glow" were released as the first singles from the album; both songs were released the day the album was announced. On March 12, 2026, Saleh released "I Do, I Do" as the album's third single. Ghostly International released the album on May 15, 2026.

== Critical reception ==
Professional ratings
Aggregate scores
Source	Rating
Metacritic	79/100
Review scores
Source	Rating
Beats Per Minute	80%
DIY	4.5/5
The Line of Best Fit	7/10
NME	4/5

According to Metacritic, Of Earth & Wires received "generally favorable reviews" based on a weighted average score of 79 out of 100 from six critic reviews.

Writing for Pitchfork, Nia Coats focused on Saleh's use of collaboration and genre contrast, arguing that the album presents connection as a response to social and environmental crisis. Katie Hawthorne gave a more mixed assessment in The Guardian, writing that the album's opening track handled its ideas with urgency but that other songs were more cautious than the subject matter suggested.

Mary Chiney of Beats Per Minute gave the album an 80% rating and described it as a record shaped by tension between environmental collapse, technology, and relationship drama. Chiney wrote that "Flood" was built during a Minneapolis session with Psymun and Vernon, and discussed "Cállate" and "Firestorm" as examples of the album's movement between dance rhythms, R&B, and climate-related imagery. Daisy Carter gave the album 4.5 out of 5 stars in DIY, writing that Saleh connected the album's ecological and technological concerns to its mix of acoustic, electronic, R&B, and experimental-pop sounds. Wehner gave the album 4 out of 5 stars in NME, describing it as a more resolved singer-songwriter statement that still kept Saleh's experimental qualities. In The Line of Best Fit, Sacha Hood gave the album a 7/10 rating and emphasized its Sudanese musical references, textured production, and themes of grief, belonging, and instability.

== Accolades ==
Accolades for Of Earth & Wires
Publication	List	Year	Rank
Consequence	The 33 Best Albums of 2026 So Far	2026	8
Flood Magazine	The Best Albums of 2026 (So Far)	2026	Unranked
NME	The best albums of 2026... so far!	2026	Unranked

== Track listing ==
Track titles and lengths are adapted from Bandcamp. Writing and production credits are adapted from Tidal.

Of Earth & Wires track listing
No.	Title	Writer(s)	Producer(s)	Length
1.	"5 Days"	Dua Saleh; Minos Drerup; William "Billy" Lemos	Lemos; Miño	2:29
2.	"Breathe"	Saleh; Lemos	Lemos	2:02
3.	"Flood" (featuring Bon Iver)	Saleh; Ethan Hansen; Lemos; Ryan Olson; Justin Vernon	Hansen; Lemos; Olson; Vernon	2:59
4.	"Cállate"	Saleh; Lemos	Lemos	1:59
5.	"Firestorm"	Saleh; Hansen; Lemos; Jeremy Nutzman; Vernon	Hansen; Lemos; Nutzman; Vernon	2:29
6.	"I Do, I Do"	Saleh; Lemos	Lemos	2:15
7.	"Keep Away" (featuring Bon Iver)	Saleh; Hansen; Lemos; Vernon	Lemos; Hansen	2:02
8.	"Glow" (featuring Bon Iver)	Saleh; Simon Christensen; Daoud; Lemos; Phil Simmonds; Vernon	Lemos; Psymun; Simmonds	2:14
9.	"Speed Up"	Saleh; Lemos	Lemos	2:02
10.	"Anemic" (with Gaidaa)	Saleh; Gaidaa Anwar Ali; Lemos	Lemos	2:17
11.	"All Is Love" (with Aja Monet)	Saleh; Aja Monet Bacquie; Lemos; Toulouse	Lemos; Toulouse	3:27
Total length:				26:15

== Personnel ==
Credits are adapted from Tidal.

- Dua Saleh – vocals
- Anthony Dolhai – mixing
- Alec Ness – mastering
- Billy Lemos – executive production
- Justin Vernon – vocals on "Flood", "Keep Away", and "Glow"
- Trans Chorus of Los Angeles – vocals on "Firestorm" and "Keep Away"
- Zakariya Khan – guitar on "Firestorm" and "Anemic"
- Malek Vossough – oud on "I Do, I Do"
- Gaidaa Anwar Ali – vocals on "Anemic"
- Aja Monet – vocals on "All Is Love"
