= DJ Tiiiiiiiiiip =

American DJ and producer

- Birth name: Taylor Madrigal
- Origin: Minneapolis, Minnesota
- Genres: Hip hop
- Occupations: DJ; promoter; record producer
- Years active: 2009–present
- Formerly of: Thestand4rd; Audio Perm; Dequexatron X000

Taylor Madrigal, known professionally as DJ Tiiiiiiiiiip, is a Minneapolis, Minnesota based DJ and promoter.

== Biography ==
Madrigal grew up in Minneapolis. His stage name is an alteration of his childhood nickname, Tip. In 2009, he became a founding member of rap collective Audio Perm. He produced beats for the group. Madrigal originally went by the name "Depo Shot". He later formed half of the duo Biter Fighters with Unfuh Qwittable of Audio Perm.

Madrigal began DJing in 2010. He joined Thestand4rd on tour in 2014. He became the official DJ of the group and served as one of their producers. He has since collaborated with artists such as Bobby Raps, Allan Kingdom, Spooky Black, Aaron Carter, and Yung Gravy. Madrigal and Bobby Raps perform together as duo Dequexatron X000.

In 2016, Madrigal contributed to Watch the Stove, a viral mixtape campaign by Hamburger Helper. He featured on "Feed the Streets", the opening track of the album.

Madrigal tours as the DJ for Yung Gravy. He has been outspoken about preventing sexual harassment during his sets.
