= Bobby Raps =

American rapper (born 1992)

Background information
- Born: Robert John Richardson; December 22, 1992 (age 33); Saint Paul, Minnesota, U.S.
- Genres: Twin Cities hip-hop; Alternative R&B; Cloud rap
- Occupations: Rapper; singer; songwriter; record producer
- Years active: 2011–present
- Formerly of: Thestand4rd; Audio Perm; Dequexatron X000

Robert John Richardson (born December 22, 1992), known professionally as Bobby Raps, is an American rapper, singer, songwriter, and record producer from Saint Paul, Minnesota. He first gained recognition in the Minnesota underground hip hop scene through self-released projects and collaborations with artists including Corbin, Allan Kingdom, and producer Psymun. His music incorporates elements of hip hop, alternative R&B, cloud rap, and experimental production.

Over the course of his career, Bobby Raps has released solo albums, mixtapes, and collaborative projects, in addition to contributing songwriting, production, programming, and vocals to recordings by artists across hip hop, pop, R&B, and electronic music.

== Early life and education ==
Bobby Raps was born Robert John Richardson on December 22, 1992, in Saint Paul, Minnesota. While in high school, he started rapping and producing beats. He graduated from Saint Paul Central High School.

== Career ==
In 2011, Bobby Raps released his debut mixtape, Gimme Daps.

In 2015, he released a collaborative EP with Corbin, titled Couch Potato. Entirely produced by Bobby Raps, it features a guest appearance from Izell Pyramid. City Pages described it as "a thoroughly haunting dose of ethereal hip-hop that sounds like if James Blake cut a record with Earl Sweatshirt." The opening song of the EP, titled "Welcome to the Hell Zone", was included on Complex's "Best Songs of the Week" list. The duo's live performances have received favorable reviews from City Pages and Billboard.

In 2016, Bobby Raps contributed to Watch the Stove, a viral mixtape campaign by Hamburger Helper. He, alongside Dequexatron X000 collaborator DJ Tiiiiiiiiiip, featured on the opening track of the album.

In 2017, he released his major-label debut, Mark, on Republic Records. It includes production from Shlohmo and D33J. Complex called it "[Bobby Raps'] strongest body of work to date."

In 2020, his single and music video "Believe the Lie" were released. The video was directed by Alex Howard. Lyrical Lemonade described Bobby Raps as "multifaceted and can’t really be put into a box".

In 2021, Bobby Raps released his album not scared anymore. It features guest appearances from Corbin and Casino Gwaup.

In 2023, Skrillex featured Bobby Raps on two songs, "Leave Me Like This" and "Don't Leave Me Like This" from his back to back albums Quest For Fire and Don't Get Too Close.

== Discography ==
=== Studio albums ===
- Thestand4rd (2014) (with Allan Kingdom, Corbin, and Psymun, as Thestand4rd)
- Mark (2017)
- not scared enough (2021)

=== Mixtapes ===
- Gimme Daps (2011)
- Wicked City (2015) (with SinGrinch)
- Weird Lil World (2018)

=== EPs ===
- Couch Potato (2015) (with Corbin)

== Production and songwriting credits ==
List of notable songs Bobby Raps has either produced, co-produced, or contributed songwriting.

2016

- The Weeknd feat. Kendrick Lamar "Sidewalks" from Starboy

2017

- Meek Mill feat. Verse Simmonds "Open" from Wins & Losses
- Kodak Black feat. Future "Boost My Ego"
- Hoodrich Pablo Juan feat. Gunna, Duke & Shad The God "Chanel Swagg" from Designer Drugz 3
- Hoodrich Pablo Juan feat. Chief Keef "They Can't Stand It" from Designer Drugz 3
- Gunna "Don't Give Up" from Drip or Drown

2018

- Young Stoner Life & Young Thug feat. Gunna "Chains Choking Me" from Slime Language
- Young Stoner Life & Young Thug feat. Jacquees & Trapboy Freddy "January 1st" from Slime Language
- Wiz Khalifa "Hot Now" from Rolling Papers 2
- Shaboozey "Golden Child" from Lady Wrangler
- NAV "Just Happened" from RECKLESS
- Lil Baby "Spazz" from Harder Than Ever
- Future & Juice WRLD "Astronauts" from Future & Juice WRLD Present… WRLD ON DRUGS
- Chief Keef "For Right Now" from The Cozart

2019

- Yung Bans feat. NAV and Lil Durk "Enemies" from MISUNDERSTOOD
- Trippie Redd feat. Lil Duke & Lil Baby "Mac 10" from ! (Exclamation Mark)
- Trippie Redd "Chosen" from A Love Letter to You 4
- TM88 feat. Lil Uzi Vert "Slayerr"
- NAV "Fell In love (demo)"
- Lil Durk "Prada You" from Love Songs 4 the Streets 2
- Future "Xanax Damage" from SAVE ME

2020

- Yung Gravy & Bobby Raps "Bag of Chips" from Gasanova
- YoungBoy Never Broke Again "I Expect You" from Until I Return
- Yak Gotti feat. Lil Gotit & Lil Keed "All Day" from Gotti Outta Here
- The Kid LAROI feat Corbin "NOT FAIR" from F*CK LOVE
- Terror Reid feat. Bobby Raps "Kill The Rich" from HOT VODKA 1
- NAV "Make It Right Back" from Emergency Tsunami
- Lil Uzi Vert "Lullaby" from Pluto x Baby Pluto
- Lil Uzi Vert feat. Syd "Urgency" from Eternal Atake
- Gunna "MET GALA" from WUNNA
- G Herbo feat. Lil Durk "Real One" from PTSD (Deluxe)

2021

- Ski Mask the Slump God "Alien Sex"
- Polo G feat. Young Thug "Losses" from Hall of Fame
- Lil Uzi Vert "Mama I'm Sorry (original)"
- IDK "Santa Monica Blvd" from USEE4YOURSELF
- Brennan Savage feat. Bobby Raps "Somber" from DARKROOM

2022

- Yung Gravy "Run Me My Money" from Marvelous
- YoungBoy Never Broke Again "My Time" from The Last Slimeto
- Travis Scott "Knife"
- M.I.A. "Time Traveller" from MATA
- LUCKI & Future "KAPITOL DENIM" from KAPITOL DENIM
- Lil Tracy "Touche" from Saturn Child
- Gunna "missing me" from DS4EVER

2023

- Yung Bans "Who Want Smoke" from Yung Bans, Vol. 6
- Young Thug feat. Nate Ruess "Global Access" from BUSINESS IS BUSINESS
- Trippie Redd feat. Banks "Saint Michael Myers" from Saint Michael
- Trippie Redd "Psychotic Lunatic" from Saint Michael V2
- The Kid LAROI feat. Corbin & Bobby Raps "PAIN ADDICT" from THE FIRST TIME (Deluxe)
- Skrillex feat. Bobby Raps "Leave Me Like This" from Don't Get Too Close
- Skrillex feat. Bobby Raps "Don't Leave Me Like This" from Quest For Fire
- Skrillex feat. Corbin & Chief Keef "Bad For Me" from Don't Get Too Close
- Offset "Don't You Lie" from SET IT OFF
- Lil Wayne "No New Bitches" from The Fix Before Tha VI
- Lil Uzi Vert "Beaming"
- Lil Uzi Vert "Prove A Point"
- Lil Uzi Vert "Mama I'm Sorry" from Pink Tape
- Lil Pump feat. YoungBoy Never Broke Again "I Don't Mind" from Lil Pump 2
- JELEEL! "JUMP JUMP!" from REAL RAW!
- JELEEL! "JELEE YEAH!" from REAL RAW!
- Desiigner "Tiimmy Turner 2" from New Color

2024

- Yung Gravy feat. Shania Twain "White Claw" from Serving Country
- Ski Mask the Slump God "Him Jung Un" from 11th Dimension
- mgk & Trippie Redd "who do i call" from genre: sadboy
- Luck feat Johan Lenox "Believe (Remix)"
- Lucki feat. Future "BBY GOAT" from GEMINI!
- Lucki "KYLIE!!!" from GEMINI!
- Lucki "Dotted Line" from GEMINI!
- Gunna "time reveals, be careful what you wish for" from one of wun
- Future & Metro Boomin "Runnin Outta Time" from WE DON'T TRUST YOU
- Future & Metro Boomin "Magic Don Juan (Princess Diana)" from WE DON'T TRUST YOU
- Future & Metro Boomin "Beat It" from WE STILL DON'T TRUST YOU
- Future & Metro Boomin "Luv Bad Bitches" from WE STILL DON'T TRUST YOU
- Future & Metro Boomin "Drink N Dance" from WE STILL DON'T TRUST YOU
- Future & Metro Boomin "Mile High Memories" from WE STILL DON'T TRUST YOU
- Chief Keef "Believe" from Almighty So 2
- A Boogie wit da Hoodie feat. Future "Somebody (Better Off Alone)" from Better Off Alone
- 42 Dugg feat. Meek Mill "4x4" from 4eva Us Neva Them
