= Adi Oasis =

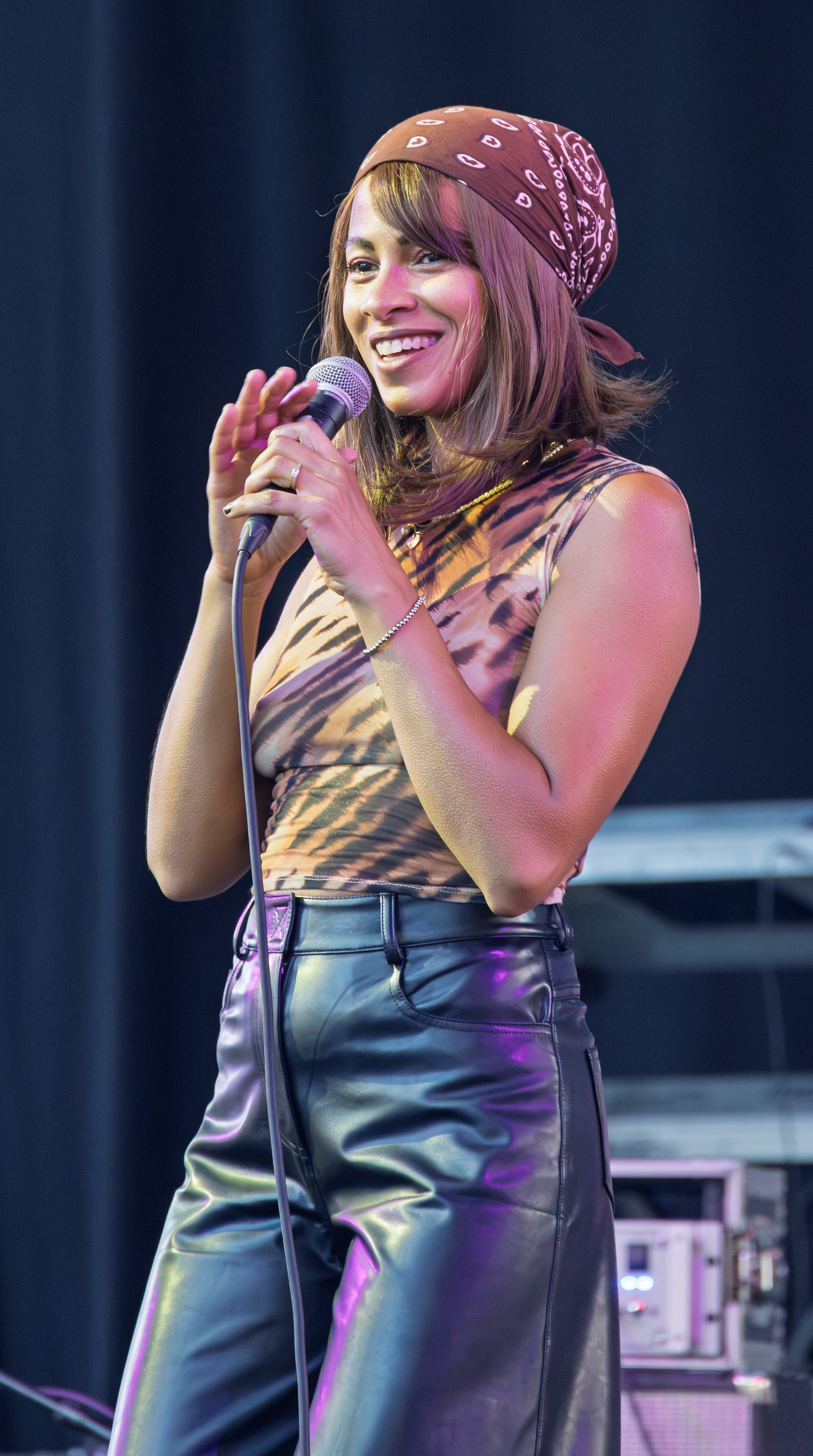
- Oasis performing in 2026

Background information
- Also known as: Adeline
- Born: Adeline Michèle Pétricien; May 17, 1985 (age 41); Saint-Mandé, Île-de-France
- Origin: French-Caribbean
- Genres: Soul; Funk; R&B
- Occupations: singer; songwriter; record producer; bassist
- Instruments: vocals; bass
- Years active: 2014-present
- Label: Unity Group
- Formerly of: Escort, The Crowd
- Website: https://adioasis.com/

Adeline Michèle Pétricien, professionally known as Adi Oasis, previously as Adeline, is a French-Caribbean (now based in Brooklyn, New York, United States) singer, bassist and producer that fuses soul, funk and R&B.

== Early life ==
Adi Oasis was born on May 17, 1985, in Saint-Mandé, Île-de-France, and grew up in a suburb of Paris, France, representing a fusion of Caribbean and Southern French heritage. Her father hails from Martinique, while her mother is from the southwest countryside. She and her three siblings grew up singing. She began performing professionally with a choir at the age of 5 and made numerous television appearances and toured across France during her upbringing.

As a teenager, Oasis taught herself to play the guitar and began composing her own songs while performing in various venues in Paris. After a year in college, she decided to pursue music and relocated to New York City, U.S..

== Career ==
=== Career beginnings ===
Adi Oasis's career began in New York, where she initially worked as a model and a DJ. During her first year in the city, she formed her first music group, "The Crowd," a trio with fellow musicians Randy Mason and Akil Dasan. Her introduction to the bass guitar occurred when the band's bass player unexpectedly canceled before a performance, and it soon became her signature instrument.

Following her time with The Crowd, Adi Oasis became the lead singer of "Escort," a New York-based nu-disco band. The band gained critical acclaim through various singles, co-written by Oasis. In 2016, she embarked on a solo career, releasing her first solo album, titled "Adeline," on November 9, 2018.

Oasis dedicated much of 2020 and 2021 to recording new music, as the COVID-19 pandemic temporarily halted most other professional activities for musicians, such as touring. She released her first EP, "Interimes," on July 10, 2020, followed by a remix of the EP, titled "Intérimixed," on September 11, 2020.

In September 2020, Adi Oasis collaborated with Atlantic Records artist KAMAUU on the single 'Mango.' The song, produced in partnership with Morgan Wiley, garnered significant attention on YouTube, amassing over 10 million views in the first year.

In January 2021, Oasis released her single 'Whisper My Name' after debuting the song on a COLORS SESSION. This track served as the first single from her 7-song EP, "Adi Oasis," which was released in September 2021.

=== Transition from Adeline to Adi Oasis ===
On April 15, 2021, she changed her stage name from Adeline to Adi Oasis. In a social media announcement, she explained that "Adi" is a nickname of Adeline, and she chose "Oasis" as it represents her sanctuary, whether on stage or in the studio.

== Influences ==
Adi Oasis draws inspiration from a range of artists, including Prince, Chaka Khan, Curtis Mayfield, Parliament-Funkadelic, Aretha Franklin, Earth Wind & Fire, Linda Clifford, Minnie Riperton, D’Angelo, and more.

== Lotus Glow ==
Lotus Glow is the second studio album by artist Adi Oasis, released on March 3, 2023. This album marks a significant milestone in her career, symbolizing both personal and artistic transformation. Adi Oasis regards it as her most personal work to date, reflecting her musical and personal growth.

=== Background ===
"Lotus Glow" serves as Oasis's debut under her new stage name, signifying a rebirth and a fresh start in her artistic journey. The album showcases her emergence as the artist she has always aspired to be, reflecting her profound changes and experiences integral to her artistic development.

=== Themes and concept ===
The album presents a narrative of Oasis's journey and serves as a reflection of her identity and experiences. The lotus flower is a recurring metaphor throughout the album, symbolizing her transformation and growth. She draws parallels between herself and the lotus, highlighting the significance of her roots and the importance of embracing one's origins.

=== Social and political commentary ===
Oasis often addresses political themes, reflecting her experiences as a woman of color with mixed heritage and an immigrant background. She emphasizes the challenges she has faced in pursuing her dreams and aims to shed light on systemic barriers. Several songs on the album, including 'Red To Violet,' 'Serena,' and 'Marigold,' can be seen as anthems for Black women, while others, such as 'Sidonie' and 'The Water,' pay homage to her family and cultural heritage.

=== Musical style and production ===
"Lotus Glow" showcases Oasis's musical growth and her pursuit of her envisioned sound. The album features a more organic and raw musical approach, with most songs incorporating live instruments. Her collaboration with other musicians and extensive live performance experience influence the album's funky, unpolished, and vibrant musical style.

=== Track listing ===
1. Le Départ
2. Get it Got it
3. Serena
4. Red To Violet (Feat. Jamila Woods)
5. Marigold (Feat. J. Hoard)
6. Dumpalltheguns
7. Multiply
8. Sidonie
9. Adonis (Feat. KIRBY)
10. U Make Me Want It
11. Naked (Feat. Leven Kali)
12. Sugarcane (Interlude)
13. The Water
14. FourSixty (Feat. Aaron Taylor)
15. Bird Machine (Bonus Track - Vinyl Only)

=== Reception ===
Upon its release, "Lotus Glow" received critical acclaim for its personal and introspective nature, Adi Oasis's artistic growth, and musicality. Critics commended her willingness to address social and political issues, as well as the album's musical diversity and captivating performances.

== Activism ==
Oasis has supported numerous causes including abortion rights, anti-racism, and gun control.

== Discography ==
=== Albums ===
- "Adeline" (2018)
- "Lotus Glow" (2023)

=== EP's ===
- "Intérimes" (2020)
- "Intérimixed" (2020)
- "Adi Oasis" (2021)
- "Adi Oasis (Remixes)" (2022)

=== Singles ===
- 'Redo' (2014)
- 'Swirl' (2018)
- 'Before' (2019)
- 'Top Down' (2019)
- 'When I'm Alone' (2019)
- 'Middle' + 'Planet Caravan' (2020)
- 'Twilight' (2020)
- 'After Midnight' (2020)
- 'Whisper My Name - A COLORS SESSION' (2021)
- 'Mystic Lover' (2021)
- '9' (2021)
- 'Eternity' Feat. Joshua J (2021)
- 'Red To Violet' Feat. Jamila Woods (2022)
- 'Get it Got it' (2022)
- 'Adonis' Feat. KIRBY (2022)
- 'Multiply' (2023)
- 'Naked' Feat. Leven Kali (2023)
- 'FourSixty' Feat. Aaron Taylor (2023)

=== Singles as featured artist ===
- Equal, LEFTI 'The Way I Move' (2017)
- Mousse T 'Up For That' & 'You Don't Know Me' (2018)
- LUXXURY 'Change Yr Mind' (2019)
- JKriv 'Lovin' Is Really My Game' & 'Yo Love' (2019)
- Jonathan Singletary 'Never Like This' (2020)
- Jacques Renault 'This Is Real' (2020)
- Jean Tonique 'Flawless' (2020)
- KAMAUU 'Mango' (2020)
- Mark Lower 'Took Me By Surprise' (2021)
- Wax Tailor 'Déjà Vu' (2021)
- Chet Faker 'It's Not You' (2022)
- The Shapeshifters 'Tell Me It's Not Over' (2022)
- Yakul 'Time To Lose' (2023)

=== Music videos ===
Year	Album	Video	Director(s)	Link
2018	Adeline	Emeralds	Hamadou Frédéric Baldé	Adi Oasis - Emeralds on YouTube
2018	Swirl (Single)	Swirl	Liza Voloshin	Adi Oasis - Swirl on YouTube
2020	Intérimes (EP)	Twilight	Adeline	Adi Oasis - Twilight on YouTube
2020	Intérimes (EP)	After Midnight	Adeline	Adi Oasis - After Midnight on YouTube
2020	Intérimes (EP)	Just Another Day	Adeline	Adi Oasis - Just Another Day on YouTube
2021	Adi Oasis (EP)	9	Adeline, Mentchu	Adi Oasis - 9 on YouTube
2021	Adi Oasis (EP)	Eternity (Feat. Joshua J)	Adeline, Sheena Sood	Adi Oasis - Eternity (Feat. Joshua J) on YouTube
2021	Adi Oasis (EP)	Stages (Feat. KAMAUU)	Adeline, KAMAUU	Adi Oasis - Stages (Feat. KAMAUU) on YouTube
2022	Lotus Glow	Red To Violet (Feat. Jamila Woods)	Simone Holland	Adi Oasis - Red To Violet (Feat. Jamila Woods) on YouTube
2023	Lotus Glow	Multiply	Braylen Dion	Adi Oasis - Multiply on YouTube
2023	Lotus Glow	Naked (Feat. Leven Kali)	Derek Milton	Adi Oasis - Naked (Feat. Leven Kali) on YouTube

== Tours ==
Adi Oasis tours globally, appearing with such artists as Anderson .Paak, Keyshia Cole, JUNGLE, Gregory Porter, Lee Fields, Big Freeda, Natalie Prass, and has performed at Central Park Summerstage, Afropunk, Funk on the Rocks (Red Rocks) and London Jazz Festival. She also played bass in artist CeeLo Green’s touring band. During the pandemic lockdowns, she performed in live broadcasts, some of which are available on her Youtube channel, including a COLORSX performance from home. Her band includes Ben Jamal Hoffmann on keyboards, and Andrew "Druvvy" McLean on drums.
