= Audio Perm =

American producer and rap collective

- Audio Perm photographed on the cover of their album WeOutChea (2012)

Background information
- Origin: Minneapolis, Minnesota
- Genres: Hip-hop
- Years active: 2009–2014
- Past members: Taylor Madrigal; Cory Grindberg; Julian Fairbanks; Chantz Erolin; 80H20; Bobby Raps; Ramiro X; Yakub; Big Dylan; Unfuh Qwittable
- Website: audioperm.tumblr.com

Audio Perm was a hip-hop collective based in Minneapolis, Minnesota.

== History ==
Audio Perm members were largely from Edison High School or South High School in Minneapolis. They started making music together after several members met at a hip-hop class taught by I Self Devine.

The name "Audio Perm" originally only applied to the three producers of the group. The three founding producers, Taylor Madrigal, Cory Grindberg, and Julian Fairbanks, started writing beats together in 2009.

In 2011, the group established the Audio Perm Block Party as an alternative to the Soundset Music Festival. The inaugural event was held in the parking lot of Shuga Records in Minneapolis. They promoted the event by releasing the free mixtape Audio Perm Block Party Compilation. The group later participated in the 2012 Soundset Music Festival. In the summer of 2012, Audio Perm released We Out Chea, a compilation of previously recorded tracks. They planned to release an official album in 2013.

Audio Perm has supplied beats to other artists, such as Prof and Illuminous 3. The group dissolved in 2014.

== Members ==
The producers for the group included Taylor Madrigal, Cory Grindberg, and Julian Fairbanks. Rappers in the group included Chantz Erolin, 80H20, Bobby Raps, Ramiro X, Yakub, Big Dylan, and Unfuh Qwittable.

== Discography ==
List adapted from official Tumblr page.

- WeOutChea (2012)
- Waggin On The Scene (The Audio Perm Remixes) (Audio Perm x Franz Diego; 2012)
- Audio Perm Block Party Compilation (2011)
- Audio Perm In Full Effect (2010)
- Audio Perm Beat Tape (2009)
