= We Beefin? =

EP by at Wendys
- Released: March 23, 2018
- Genre: Hip-hop
- Length: 10:45
- Label: Six Course, Inc.

At Wendys chronology
We Beefin? (2018)	Songs to Listen to in a Wendy's Parking Lot (2026)

We Beefin? is the debut EP album by international fast-food restaurant chain Wendy's under the alias at Wendys. It was released on March 23, 2018 for free by marketing company VML under the creative direction of Six Course, Inc. A female rapper performs and takes the persona of the Wendy's mascot throughout the EP.

== Background and release ==
The EP was released on March 23, 2018, for free on streaming services. Upon release, "Rest in Grease" debuted on Spotify's Global Viral 50, and is the song's highest charting position. The EP received praise from rappers Tory Lanez and T-Pain.

== Production and lyrics ==
UPROXX said, "The beats are very modern". The majority of its lyrics target other fast-food restaurant chains such as Burger King and McDonald's. The title and lyrics of "4 for $4" derives from the restaurant's menu option which includes a burger, fries, chicken nuggets, and a drink for $4.

== Artwork and title ==
The artwork for We Beefin? is based on American rapper The Notorious B.I.G.'s debut studio album Ready to Die. The artwork pays homage to the album, and its influence on hip hop. The title is a reference to the Wendy's 1984 advertising campaign Where's the beef?, and is a play on the usage of "beef" to mean a feud between two individuals, particularly rappers in hip hop.

== Track listing ==
Credits adapted from ASCAP.

All tracks are written by Andre Middleton and Richard Moultrie.

We Beefin?
No.	Title	Length
1.	"Twitter Fingers"	1:48
2.	"Holding It Down" (featuring Wendy Williams)	3:12
3.	"Rest in Grease"	1:30
4.	"Clownin"	1:44
5.	"4 for $4"	2:31
Total length:		10:45

=== Notes ===
- 4 for $4 contains a sample of "Feel Me", written and performed by Steven Malcom
- Wendy Williams, credited as a featured artist on "Holding It Down", is an alias of at Wendys

== Release history ==
Country	Date	Format	Label	Ref.
Various	March 23, 2018	Digital download; streaming	Six Course, Inc.	

== See also ==
- Watch the Stove
