= Corbin (musician) =

American singer (born 1998)

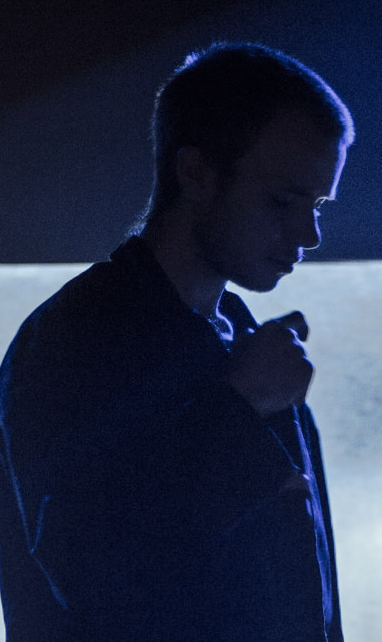
- Corbin performing in 2017

Background information
- Also known as: Spooky Black; Lil Spook
- Born: Corbin Beckner Smidzik; February 20, 1998 (age 28); Baltimore, Maryland, U.S.
- Origin: Saint Paul, Minnesota, U.S.
- Genres: Cloud rap; alternative R&B; electronic; new wave
- Occupations: Rapper; singer; songwriter; record producer
- Years active: 2013–present
- Formerly of: Thestand4rd

Corbin Beckner Smidzik (born February 20, 1998), known mononymously as Corbin and formerly as Spooky Black and Lil Spook, is an American rapper, singer, songwriter, and record producer. He was a member of the hip hop/R&B collective Thestand4rd. As Corbin, he has released three studio albums, Mourn (2017), Ghost With Skin (2021), and Crisis Kid (2025).

== Career ==
Smidzik gained popularity on the internet through a series of solo releases on the website SoundCloud. His first release Forest was put out in late 2013 and exhibited a hip hop sound with Smidzik rapping on every song, in contrast to his later and more recognized R&B-stylized singing.

By 2014, Smidzik was gaining mass exposure with the help of SoundCloud and YouTube. The video for the song "Without You", from the mixtape Black Silk (released in February 2014), went viral, attaining more than a million views on video-sharing websites YouTube and WorldStarHipHop. Noisey declared the video an "instant classic" and published an article titled "Is Spooky Black Going to Take Over the R&B Game?", while Consequence of Sound and Complex magazine named "Without You" one of the best songs of 2014.

Smidzik is noted for releasing his material without promotion, and has frequently declined requests for interviews. In August 2014, he released the EP Leaving and a music video for its track "DJ Khaled Is My Father". By October, Smidzik was being managed by Canadian producer Doc McKinney. In December, he premiered a new song, "Worn", under the new name Corbin. On Twitter, Smidzik's reason for the name change was because "Spooky Black is a dumb name."

Also in 2014, Smidzik and fellow Minnesota musicians Allan Kingdom, Bobby Raps, and Psymun formed the hip hop/R&B group Thestand4rd. They released their self-titled debut album, Thestand4rd, in November 2014, produced entirely by the group and Doc McKinney. During November 2014, Corbin and the Stand4rd embarked on a US tour, which included a gig at SOB's in New York City where they were introduced by DJ Khaled. The group ended up selling out all seven of the shows on their debut headlining tour.

After the release of Couch Potato with Bobby Raps in 2015, Smidzik remained quiet and rarely did performances for 2 years. On January 16, 2017, Smidzik unexpectedly uploaded a song, "Destrooy" onto his SoundCloud. On June 25, 2017, he announced on Twitter that himself, Shlohmo, and D33J would be going on a North American tour later in the year. Later, on August 24, Smidzik announced his debut album, Mourn, which was released on September 5, 2017, on Shlohmo's record label Wedidit.

In American recording artist Janet Jackson's State of the World Tour, she uses the song "Idle" from Corbin's Leaving EP as a video interlude before playing the song "What About".

On January 1, 2019, Corbin released several singles to his SoundCloud page. The first to be released was "Wretch" as a New Years gift to fans. Over the course of the year, "Wretch" was followed by additional singles, both new and unreleased. Later, in August of the same year, Corbin lost access to his Spotify account.

In 2020 as a response to losing access to his Spotify account, Corbin started uploading previous SoundCloud uploads to a new Spotify page under his name, Corbin Smidzik. Included in these uploads is a previous version of his album Mourn, simply titled: Mourn 2016.

On July 24, 2020, Corbin was featured on the Kid Laroi's song "Not Fair" from his debut mixtape, F*ck Love. Corbin also appeared in the accompanying music video released the same day. The song was certified Gold in Australia by ARIA in 2021.

The song, "Interlude" on his E.P. "Leaving" appeared at the end of the documentary, Untold: Caitlyn Jenner released on August 24, 2021.

On October 20, 2026, Corbin released new single "Worth It" as a part of a Cyberpunk: Edgerunners 2 soundtrack.

Corbin has written songs for artists including SONNY, Future, NAV, and Dua Saleh.

== Discography ==
=== Studio albums ===
- Thestand4rd (2014) (as Spooky Black, with Allan Kingdom, Bobby Raps, and Psymun, collectively as Thestand4rd)
- Mourn (2017)
- Mourn 2016 (2019) (as Corbin Smidzik)
- Ghost with Skin (2021)
- Crisis Kid (2025)

=== Mixtapes ===
- Forest (2013) (as Spooky Black)
- Black Silk (2014) (as Lil Spook)

=== Extended plays ===
- Leaving (2014) (as Spooky Black)
- Couch Potato (2015) (with Bobby Raps)

=== Singles ===
- "Ready" ft. Bobby Raps (Prod. Bobby Raps) (2014)
- "Reason" (2016)
- "Worn" (2016)
- "Destrooy" (2017）
- "Wretch" (2019)
- "Calmdown" (2019)
- "F*ckthisbad(rufff)" (2019)
- "There's a 100 Million Girls in the World.. But I... Want... Youuu" (2019)
- "Misery Demo" (2019)
- "Krrokodil Interlude" (2019)
- "Tell Me" (2021)
- "Promise to Me" (2022)
- "Hello There" (with Lyrical Lemonade, Lil Tracy, and Black Kray) (2023)
- "Carbon Monoxide" (2025)
- "Come Down" (2025)
- "Worth It" (2026)
