= DJ Keezy =

American DJ

Akeena Bronson, known professionally as DJ Keezy, is a DJ from Minneapolis, Minnesota.

== Background ==
DJ Keezy was born and raised in North Minneapolis. She began DJing in 2013 after encouragement from Minneapolis artists DJ Snuggles and BdotCroc. Keezy speaks on the energy of working with other women such as BdotCroc, and has advocated for all-women line-ups in musical sets.

== Career ==
DJ Keezy is most known for spinning throwback music such as 1990s hip-hop and R&B, Motown, and Funk. She credits Prince as an inspiration and has a tattoo of his purple love symbol on her arm. She has been the opener for acts such as Kehlani, Big Freedia, The Internet, Cupcakke and Trina & Da Brat.

Noticing the lack of events featuring all-female performers, DJ Keezy threw her first all-women event in 2015 in First Avenue's Record Room under the name Fixx. In 2016, Keezy spun records on Minnesota Public Radio's The Current as a part of their Pride Anthems show curated by DJ Shannon Blowtorch. In 2017, she played a 10-day run at South by Southwest with frequent collaborator BdotCroc. She played sets at Soundset Festival in 2017 and 2019. Inv2019, she participated in Dizzyland, put together by Red Bull and Dizzy Fae, and described as "a melting pot of sorts for up-and-coming Queer and POC talent". Keezy toured nationally with Rhymesayers acts Atmosphere and Dem Atlas in 2017, 2018, and 2019, and with Atmosphere, The Lioness, and Nikki Jean in early 2020.

In September 2020, DJ Keezy participated in a livestreamed concert series called Amplifying Solidarity that was put on through Northrop and the University of Minnesota, and was broadcast live on Radio K.

=== The Klituation ===
DJ Keezy is one of the founders of the Klituation, an annual dance party for celebrating Women's Month. Maria Isa is credited with the name "Klituation" as a nod to the consistent all-female line-ups. Keezy curates other dance nights throughout the Twin Cities in Minnesota and aims to show the collective power of creative women. The fourth Klituation dance party held at First Avenue's Mainroom in Minneapolis in 2016, featured Sophia Eris, Shannon Blowtorch, Sarah White, Maria Isa, The Lioness, Manchita, K.Raydio, and Lady Midnight. The Klituation has been hosted regularly at First Avenue since then.

=== Auntie's Venue ===
In July 2020, DJ Keezy, Lady Midnight, and Sophia Eris launched a fundraiser with the goal of the opening of a music venue called Auntie's. Auntie's would be the only music venue in Minnesota to be owned by women of color.

The artists pledged to bring in workers in mental health and sexual violence advocacy fields as well as community members in order to create a business model that reflects their goals and mission. In speaking of the difficulties of organizing inclusive events at mainstream venues, DJ Keezy told NPR "For me, it's the disconnect between the people that throw the events and the venue … They hold a major energy … Sometimes it's very disrespectful".

== Awards ==
- Twin Cities Best Club DJ – City Pages, 2017
