= Lady Midnight (artist) =

American vocalist and multidisciplinary artist

Adriana Rimpel, known professionally as Lady Midnight, is an American multidisciplinary artist, vocalist, songwriter, educator and community leader based in Minneapolis, Minnesota.

== Early life and education ==
Rimpel was born in St. Paul's West Side in Minnesota. Her father was a drummer and her mother a singer in the first Minnesota salsa band, Sabroson. She was an intern on Don’t Believe the Hype, a television program on Twin Cities' PBS produced by POC youth that empowered young people's creativity. She has a Bachelor of Fine Arts in Photography from the Minneapolis College of Art and Design and studied Studio Dance for over 12 years. Rimpel is bi-lingual and identifies as Afro-Indigenous, Mexican, Haitian, and Aztec.

== Music career ==
Rimpel has a background in Afro-Cuban music, hip-hop, pop, R&B, and experimental music. She first started performing music as a vocalist in the Minneapolis-based Afro-Cubana group Malamanya in the year 2000. She was with Malamanya for four years and performed with them as part of The Lowertown Line, a live recording and interview by TPT Twin Cities PBS. She is also a member of the twin cities' electro-pop group VANDAAM. In 2016 she put out a 5-song EP with Afrokeys under the name Parables of Neptune which included the song "Wax Line".

Rimple coined the name Lady Midnight in 2012, and debuted her solo act of the same name during her performance titled Midnight Special at First Avenue's 7th Street Entry in 2016. Lady Midnight's performances are a blend of sound, visuals, and costume. Blending indigenous and futuristic aesthetics, she uses costume and hair to create wearable sculptures. She works with Minneapolis-based hair artist and activist Dre Demry-Sanders to create unique head dress and cornrow styles for her performances. Her music is an expression of her experiences with culture, feminism, and race. She believes that music has healing and restorative powers.

Rimpel had her Chicago debut in 2018 at Kombi Chicago with opening act DJ Just Nine. She performed at Pilsen Fest in Chicago in 2018. Her debut solo album, Death Before Mourning, was recorded in the south Minneapolis's Woodgrain Studios and was released in 2019. Her album release show was held at St.Paul's Turf Club and featured opening acts Ziyad, Booboo, and DJ Keezy.

Rimpel has performed and recorded with artists including Brother Ali, Bon Iver, Common, Sarah White, Moby, Andra Day, P.O.S., Maria Isa, Mike the Martyr, and Aloe Blacc.

== Community outreach ==
Rimpel was the Teen Programs Manager at the Walker Art Center's Teen Arts Council in 2010 where she encouraged teens to learn artistic and creative problem-solving skills as well as gain knowledge of the arts and their potential for civic contribution. She is a freelance instructor at the University of Minnesota, St. Paul's Community Libraries and Rec Centers, and the Minneapolis Institute of Arts. She teaches music performance and production to youth at Kulture Klub Collaborative, a Minnesota arts non-profit for youth experiencing homelessness. She has spoken on panels and contributed to research nationwide about the impact of the arts on youth, in partnership with The Walker Art Center, The Whitney Museum, Museum of Contemporary Art, and Contemporary Arts Museum Houston.

In July 2020, Rimpel teamed up with DJ Keezy and Sophia Eris to launch a fundraiser on the platform GoFundMe. The fundraiser, which raised nearly $30,000 on its first day, aims to fund the opening of a music venue called Aunties, which would be the only music venue in Minnesota to be owned by women of color. The artists stated their inspiration to start a venue comes from both the uprising following the murder of George Floyd and the need to create a safe space in the wake of accusations of misogyny and sexual assault in the twin-cities music industry. The artists pledged to bring in workers in mental health and sexual violence advocacy fields as well as community members in order to create a business model that reflects their goals and mission.

== Awards ==
Rimpel was named one of The Local Show's Artists to Watch in 2016. She was named Best Twin Cities Vocalist of 2017 by City Pages, and #3 Picked to Click in 2017 by City Pages. Her album, Death Before Mourning, won Best Album from the City Pages' Best of the Twin Cities 2020.
