= No Wyld =

- Origin: Auckland, New Zealand
- Genres: Hip hop, rock, indie rock
- Years active: 2010–2017
- Label: Columbia Records
- Members: Mo Kheir; Brandon Black; Joseph Pascoe
- Website: No Wyld

No Wyld (formerly known as The Wyld) was a New Zealand alternative hip hop band, formed in 2010.

== History ==
Mohamed "Mo" Kheir and Joe Pascoe met while studying architecture at university in 2007. They joined Brandon Black two years later through Kheir's older brother, Moomin Kheir. They began covering tracks they liked, and performing at open mic nights.

"Revolution" was the first single that attracted attention online. The track earned praise from MTV Iggy in the United States and was subsequently included in United States TV show 90210.

The band attracted the interest of major sponsors like Red Bull, who included them in a major campaign. In August 2013, they began recording their first EP, Abstract, at Red Bull Studios. The Wyld relocated to the United States where they secured a recording contract with Columbia records in 2013 and then a Publishing deal with Sony ATV in April 2014.

The track "Odyssey" was used in a commercial for McDonald's during Sochi 2014, and later included in the soundtrack for NHL 15, Madden NFL 16 and Need for Speed. "Odyssey" was also featured in the pregame video played before the West Virginia University Mountaineers football team took the field for home games during the 2015 season. In addition, "Let Me Know" was included in the soundtrack for FIFA 16.

This song also appeared in EA Sports game, FIFA 17 with "Justfayu" featuring KAMAU. Their song "Air" was used as the official theme song for WWE's Elimination Chamber event in 2017.

== Band members ==
- Mohamed "Mo" Kheir – Vocals
- Brandon Black – Vocals, Production
- Joseph Pascoe – Guitar, Production

== Discography ==
No Wyld discography
- Studio albums: 2
- EPs: 2
- Singles: 10
- Music videos: 4

=== Studio albums ===
Title	Album details	Peak chart positions	Certifications	Sales
Title	Album details	NZ	Certifications	Sales
Preface	Released: 29 June 2012; Label: Dryden Street; Format: CD, download	36		
Nomads	Released: 25 November 2016; Label: Columbia; Format: download			

=== Extended plays ===
Title	Album details
Abstract	Released: 29 October 2013; Label: Fontana North; Format: CD, download
Ascension	Released: 9 October 2015; Label: Columbia Records; Format: CD, download

=== Singles ===
==== As lead artist ====
Title	Year	Peak chart positions	Certifications	Album
Title	Year	NZ	Certifications	Album
"Revolution"	2011	–		Preface
"Full Circle"	2012	–		Preface
"Rome"	2012	–		Preface
"Odyssey"	2013	–		Abstract and Ascension
"Queen" (featuring KAMAU)	2015	–		Ascension
"Let Me Know"	2015	–		Ascension and Nomads
"Afraid"	2015	–		non-album single
"Paranoid"	2016	–		Nomads
"Tomorrow" (featuring Allan Kingdom)	2016	–		Nomads
"Grown Up"	2016	–		Nomads
"Gone"	2016	–		Nomads
"—" denotes a recording that did not chart or was not released in that territory.

==== As featured artist ====
Title	Year	Peak chart positions	Certifications	Album
Title	Year	NZ	Certifications	Album
"Jusfayu" (KAMAU featuring No Wyld)	2015	–		A Gorgeous Fortune EP

=== Music videos ===
Title	Year	Director(s)
"Revolution"	2011	No Wyld & Joe Rixon
"Full Circle"	2012	Claire Littler
"Rome"	2012	Moomin Kheir
"Odyssey"	2015	No Wyld
