= Dark Red (album) =

Studio album by Shlohmo
- Released: April 7, 2015
- Genre: Electronic
- Length: 58:24
- Label: True Panther Sounds
- Producer: Shlohmo

Shlohmo chronology
Bad Vibes (2011)	Dark Red (2015)	The End (2019)

Dark Red is the second studio album by American electronic musician Shlohmo. It was released through True Panther Sounds on April 7, 2015.

== Critical reception ==
Professional ratings
Aggregate scores
Source	Rating
Metacritic	69/100
Review scores
Source	Rating
AllMusic	4/5 stars
Consequence of Sound	B−
Exclaim!	7/10
HipHopDX	3.5/5 stars
NME	7/10
Pitchfork	5.9/10
Resident Advisor	2.7/5
Spin	7/10

At Metacritic, which assigns a weighted average score out of 100 to reviews from mainstream critics, the album received an average score of 69, based on 15 reviews, indicating "generally favorable reviews".

Paul Simpson of AllMusic gave the album 4 out of 5 stars, saying: "The resulting album successfully fleshes out Shlohmo's previous sound into his most accomplished work so far, and ultimately manages to find hope in darkness." Sheldon Pearce of Consequence of Sound gave the album a grade of B−, calling it "a violently loud, dizzying articulation of grief and loss."

== Track listing ==
No.	Title	Length
1.	"Ten Days of Falling"	4:46
2.	"Meet Ur Maker"	5:23
3.	"Buried"	6:55
4.	"Emerge from Smoke"	4:43
5.	"Slow Descent"	6:20
6.	"Apathy" (featuring D33J)	5:25
7.	"Relentless"	5:14
8.	"Ditch"	4:41
9.	"Remains"	3:28
10.	"Fading"	6:08
11.	"Beams"	5:23

== Charts ==
Chart	Peak position
US Top Dance Albums (Billboard)	10
US Heatseekers Albums (Billboard)	20
