= Thestand4rd =

American hip hop/R&B group

- The band in 2014. From left: Allan Kingdom, Bobby Raps, Psymun, Corbin

Background information
- Origin: Minneapolis, Minnesota
- Genres: Hip hop, R&B
- Years active: 2014–2017
- Past members: Bobby Raps; Allan Kingdom; Corbin; Psymun

Thestand4rd was a hip hop/R&B group based in St. Paul, Minnesota. It was formed by producer and rapper Bobby Raps, producer and rapper Allan Kingdom, singer Corbin, and producer Psymun. They were joined on-stage by DJ Tiiiiiiiiiip.

== History ==
The band started when Bobby Raps messaged Corbin, then known as Spooky Black, on SoundCloud. The two began to collaborate. Tiiiiiiiiiip introduced the duo to Psymun, and the three produced the song "Blind". Allan Kingdom joined the group shortly thereafter.

Their self-titled debut album was produced with the help of Doc McKinney. The album was written and recorded over the course of a month at McKinney's studio in Toronto. Thestand4rd was released on SoundCloud in November 2014. They played their first live show that November, which kicked off an 8-stop tour.

The group performed at Rock the Garden in 2015. In 2017, they played at the Soundset Music Festival.

By June 2017, the group had disbanded. In a 2018 interview, Allan Kingdom stated that they ceased working together after suffering from a "weak foundation", citing issues with members of the music industry taking advantage of the group.

== Discography ==
- thestand4rd (2014)
