= D.M.B. =

2022 single by ASAP Rocky

Single by ASAP Rocky
- Released: May 5, 2022
- Genre: Psychedelic rap; cloud rap; trap
- Length: 4:51
- Label: Polo Grounds; RCA
- Songwriters: Rakim Mayers; Hector Delgado; Joseph Adenuga Jr.; Kelvin Magnusen; Henry Laufer; Djavan Santos; Hamilton Bohannon
- Producers: ASAP Rocky; Skepta; Delgado; Kelvin Krash; Shlohmo; D33J

ASAP Rocky singles chronology
"The God Hour" (2022)	"D.M.B." (2022)	"Kind of Girl" (2022)

Music video
- "D.M.B." on YouTube

"D.M.B." (also stylized as DAT$ MAH B!*$H), is a song by American rapper ASAP Rocky, released on May 5, 2022. It was produced by Rocky himself, along with Skepta, Hector Delgado, Kelvin Krash, Shlohmo and D33J. The song is an ode to Rocky's partner, Barbadian singer Rihanna.

== Background ==
"D.M.B." is an abbreviation for "dat's my bitch", referring to Rihanna, whom ASAP Rocky has been dating since 2020. The song was first previewed in June 2021, from a commercial for Klarna. In July of that year, Rocky and Rihanna were seen shooting a music video for the song in a Bronx neighborhood.

== Composition and lyrics ==
In the first verse, ASAP Rocky recounts the history of his romantic relationship with Rihanna, admitting he initially thought it would be short-lived. He mentions them sharing clothes with each other and Rihanna feeding his friends, while also supposedly referencing R&B singer and Rihanna's ex-boyfriend Chris Brown and their highly publicized domestic violence case: "I don't beat my bitch, I need my bitch / She clean my crib, she feed my friends / She keep my secret, she keep my fridge packed, my freezer lit". The second verse finds Rocky rapping in pitched-up vocals about Rihanna's riches and his dreams of taking her to the Bronx. The song also utilizes the chopped and screwed qualities that defined Rocky's early catalog; in the latter half of the song, the instrumental switches to "deeper experimental production containing a psychedelic twist".

== Critical reception ==
Chris DeVille of Stereogum praised the work of the producers, writing, "They've done a good job of bringing back that classic early A$AP vibe without making it sound like a retread of past glories, and the beat switch partway through takes the tune in a fascinating new direction." Alphonse Pierre of Pitchfork reviewed the song favorably, writing, "It sounds like Rocky is looking for a babysitter rather than a girlfriend, but hey, his flow is laid-back and charismatic, and he can still make lines sound cooler than they actually are." He also regarded the altering of Rocky's vocals and melodies in the song as suited for its theme, writing that "Even if it goes off the rails at the end with lots of bad singing and an overproduced outro, Rocky is in love, so doing corny shit is understandable now."

== Music video ==
The music video premiered alongside the single. In it, Rocky and Rihanna spend time with each other around New York City, including fine dining, drinking wine, and shopping at flea markets. Later in the video, Rocky opens his mouth and shows his grills reading "Marry Me?", to which Rihanna responds by showing her own grills which read, "I Do." Rihanna also visits Rocky when he leaves jail. Toward the end of the video, a wedding celebration for the two is held, as they walk through a corridor filled with friends and shower them with rose petals. The clip concludes with Rihanna and Rocky sharing a kiss.

== Charts ==
Chart performance for "D.M.B."
Chart (2022)	Peak position
Canada Hot 100 (Billboard)	70
Global 200 (Billboard)	117
New Zealand Hot Singles (RMNZ)	10
South Africa Streaming (TOSAC)	34
US Bubbling Under Hot 100 (Billboard)	2
US Hot R&B/Hip-Hop Songs (Billboard)	32
