= Kamauu =

American singer and rapper (born 1991)

- Born: Kamau Mbonisi Kwame Agyeman; February 2, 1991 (age 35); Washington, D.C., U.S.
- Origin: Brooklyn, New York City
- Genres: Hip hop; rap; R&B; soul; funk
- Occupations: Rapper; singer
- Years active: 2014–present
- Labels: Atlantic; Invisible Firm
- Website: www.kamauu.world

Kamau Mbonisi Kwame Agyeman, known professionally by his stage name, Kamauu (stylized as KAMAUU, and formerly KAMAU and brother KAMAU), is an American singer and rapper. He released his debut EP, A Gorgeous Fortune, in 2016.

== Early life and education ==
Kamau Mbonisi Kwame Agyeman was born on February 2, 1991, in Washington, D.C. and grew up in Prince George's County, Maryland. His parents introduced him and his two siblings to music at a young age. His older brother is a fellow musician who goes by the stage name, Nkō Khélí. As a child, Agyeman attended school at the Ujamaa Shule in Washington which is described as the "oldest completely independent Afrikan-centered school in the United States". While at the school, he was exposed to a variety of traditional African instruments like the djembe, and he studied African music, history, and culture. In 2009, he moved to Brooklyn, New York where he began attending the Pratt Institute to study film. While at Pratt, he met other musicians and artists and was introduced to the artist collective, BiGCiTYBiGCiTY. Members of the collective helped him hone his musical skills. He later graduated from Pratt in 2014 with a BA in Film.

== Career ==
In February 2014, Kamauu released a mixtape called TheKAMAU-CASSETTE. In 2015, Agyeman received recognition for his song covers including those for Outkast's "Hey Ya!" and Adele's "Hometown Glory". In May 2016, he released a video for his song, "Jambo". The video was the first in a six-part series of films that would be made for each song on his A Gorgeous Fortune EP. Another single (and its accompanying video) from that collection called "Jusfayu" (featuring No Wyld) was released in June 2016. It would go on to be featured on an episode of the HBO series, Insecure and on the soundtrack for FIFA 17. It has also accumulated over 10 million streams on various platforms as of August 2019. A remix of the song by Lion Babe was released later in June 2016. A Gorgeous Fortune itself came out in July 2016 on Invisible Firm and was followed by a Kamauu summer tour with Lion Babe.

In 2016, Kamauu helped co-found "DoloBhana", a multi-disciplinary artist collective that was based in an apartment in Crown Heights, Brooklyn. In October 2016, Kamauu was featured on the soundtrack for the film, The Birth of a Nation, with the song, "The Icarus". The following month, he released the single, "MĭNT" featuring Talibah Safiya. The music video for that song came out in January 2017. It would serve as the lead single for his second mixtape entitled TheKAMAU-CASSETTE: ŭRTH GōLD which was released in September 2017. In February 2018, he was featured on the Kota the Friend song, "Black Sheep". In March of that year, Kamauu was featured on the Topaz Jones track, "Pleasure Pain Passion". Later that month, he played a show in Nairobi, Kenya at the Thrift Social installation.

After a year, he returned with the track "Patiently" as part of the collaborative project, Splash Brothers, which also features Allan Kingdom, Topaz Jones, Haile Supreme, and SIIMBA SELASSIIE. In May 2019 he began using his current stage name, Kamauu, and was featured on the Marques Martin song, "Dinner Date". The following month he was featured on the Stella Santana song, "Tell The Truth". In July of that year, he released a four-track EP entitled TheKAMAUU-CASSETTE: MíXD GRēēNS. Music videos for two of the EP's songs ("clover" and "bamboo") were released the following month. In 2020, Kamauu released many singles.

After a long break that saw little activity from Kamauu, he returned in April 2023 with Atlantic Recording Corporation to release his second album, "LACUNA in The House of Mirrors", featuring 11 tracks, including 2 songs released earlier as singles, "Flings" and "Antidote". He finished the year collaborating with Mike Schultz to release "Where There Are Dreams There Are Dragons, Vol. 1", an instrumental Afrobeats-inspired album released by Upside Records. They followed up on this album with a single in March 2024.

Earlier in the year, Kamauu released two other singles, named "Danger" and "Garden", in January and February, respectively. A dance mix of the latter song was released in June, along with a fourth single of the year, "WEIDAMINEH", with TrapCellist and Siimbiie Lakew.

== Discography ==
=== Mixtapes ===
List of mixtapes with selected details
Title	Details
TheKAMAU-CASSETTE	Released: February 15, 2014 (US); Label: Self-released; Formats: Digital download
TheKAMAU-CASSETTE: ŭRTH GōLD	Released: September 12, 2017 (US); Label: Invisible Firm; Formats: Digital download
LACUNA in The House of Mirrors	Released: April 28, 2023 (US); Label: Atlantic; Formats: Digital download
Where There Are Dreams There Are Dragons, Vol. 1	Released: December 31, 2023 (US); Label: Upside Records; Formats: Digital download

=== EPs ===
List of EPs with selected details
Title	Details
A Gorgeous Fortune	Released: July 1, 2016 (US); Label: Invisible Firm; Formats: Digital download
TheKAMAUU-CASSETTE: MíXD GRēēNS	Released: July 30, 2019 (US); Label: Atlantic; Formats: Digital download

=== Singles ===
List of singles with selected details
Title	Year	Album
"Jambo"	2016	A Gorgeous Fortune
"Jusfayu" (feat. No Wyld)	2016	A Gorgeous Fortune
"The Icarus"	2016	The Birth of a Nation: The Inspired By Album
"MĭNT" (feat. Talibah Safiya)	2016	TheKAMAU-CASSETTE: ŭRTH GōLD
"GRā" (feat. Nkō Khélí)	2017	TheKAMAU-CASSETTE: ŭRTH GōLD
"clover"	2019	TheKAMAUU-CASSETTE: MíXD GRēēNS
"bamboo"	2019	TheKAMAUU-CASSETTE: MíXD GRēēNS
"flings"	2023	LACUNA in The House of Mirrors
"antidote"	2023	LACUNA in The House of Mirrors
"Garden"	2024	
“Danger”	2024	
“Where There Are Dreams There Are Dragons”	2024	
“WEIDAMINEH”	2024	
