= Watch the Stove =

EP by Helper
- Released: April 1, 2016
- Genre: Hip hop
- Length: 13:37

Watch the Stove (stylized in all caps) is the debut EP album by food brand Hamburger Helper under the alias Helper. It was released on April 1, 2016, through SoundCloud.

== Background and release ==
The idea of a Hamburger Helper album came from a tweet in 2014, where the brand jokingly stated the mascot would release a mixtape. It became the brand's most-favorited tweet.

The EP was released as an April Fools joke by General Mills in collaboration with marketing agency Ketchum Inc. The title references the Jay-Z and Kanye West album Watch the Throne. It subsequently went viral on Twitter. Within a week, the album had 5 million streams on SoundCloud.

== Production ==
The EP was produced by a team at the McNally Smith College of Music and local Minneapolis artists. Two music videos were shot. Songs were required to be family-appropriate and contain no swear words.

== Track listing ==
Track listing for Watch the Stove
No.	Title	Producer(s)	Length
1.	"Feed the Streets"	DEQUEXATRON X000 Bobby Raps and DJ Tiiiiiiiiiip	2:10
2.	"Hamburger Helper"	Retro Spectro	4:04
3.	"Crazy"	Illwin and Realistic Productions	2:53
4.	"Food for Your Soul"	GenReal	2:17
5.	"In Love with the Glove"	@itsdandy	2:13
Total length:			13:37

== See also ==
- We Beefin?
