= The End (Shlohmo album) =

Studio album by Shlohmo
- Released: March 22, 2019
- Genres: Downtempo; glitch hop; IDM; experimental rock
- Length: 61:52
- Label: Friends of Friends

Shlohmo chronology
Dark Red (2015)	The End (2019)

Professional ratings
Review scores
Source	Rating
AllMusic	4/5 stars

The End is the third studio album by American electronic musician Shlohmo, released on March 22, 2019 by Friends of Friends.

== Track listing ==
No.	Title	Length
1.	"Rock Music"	4:40
2.	"The End"	4:35
3.	"Hopeless"	5:31
4.	"Eating Away"	4:20
5.	"Headache of the Year"	4:48
6.	"Ungrateful"	4:42
7.	"Staring at a Wall"	3:18
8.	"We Sat in the Car"	4:30
9.	"Panic Attack"	5:32
10.	"Watching a Video"	4:21
11.	"The Best of Me"	6:06
12.	"By Myself"	4:27
13.	"Still Life"	4:58
Total length:		61:52
