= Green Label =

Online magazine

- Available in: English
- Founded: 2013
- Headquarters: {{{location_country}}}
- Website: Green Label

Green Label was an online magazine, a partnership between Mountain Dew and Complex Media, producing sponsored content covering action sports, music, art and style. The site replaces several websites and a YouTube channel overseen by PepsiCo since 2007. The initiative originated in 2013. It became defunct in 2018.

== Green Label Art ==
Mountain Dew's Green Label promotion originated in 2007, when a line of limited edition aluminum bottles was put into production, featuring artwork from a range of tattoo artists and other artists. This initial series marked the first use of the term Green Label Art to describe the use of artistic works on Mountain Dew packaging. In June 2010, a contest entitled "Green Label Art: Shop Series" was announced, involving 35 independent skateboard store owners who partnered with local artists to design and submit future can artwork designs. Approximately one million votes were submitted by the contest's conclusion in October of the same year, with Street Science Skate Shop – a store in Tracy, California – named the winner of a cash prize. This winning can design was scheduled to appear on Mountain Dew cans in 2011.

== Green Label Sound ==
In 2008, a Mountain Dew-sponsored music label was launched under the name Green Label Sound. In December 2010, a Mountain Dew Code Red television advertisement was produced, incorporating the hip-hop artist Jay Electronica performing his song The Announcement. The advertisement concludes with the tagline, "Hip Hop is different on the mountain".

The label released its first full-length album release, When Fish Ride Bicycles by the hip-hop group The Cool Kids, on June 12, 2011.

== Dew Tour/Green Label experience ==
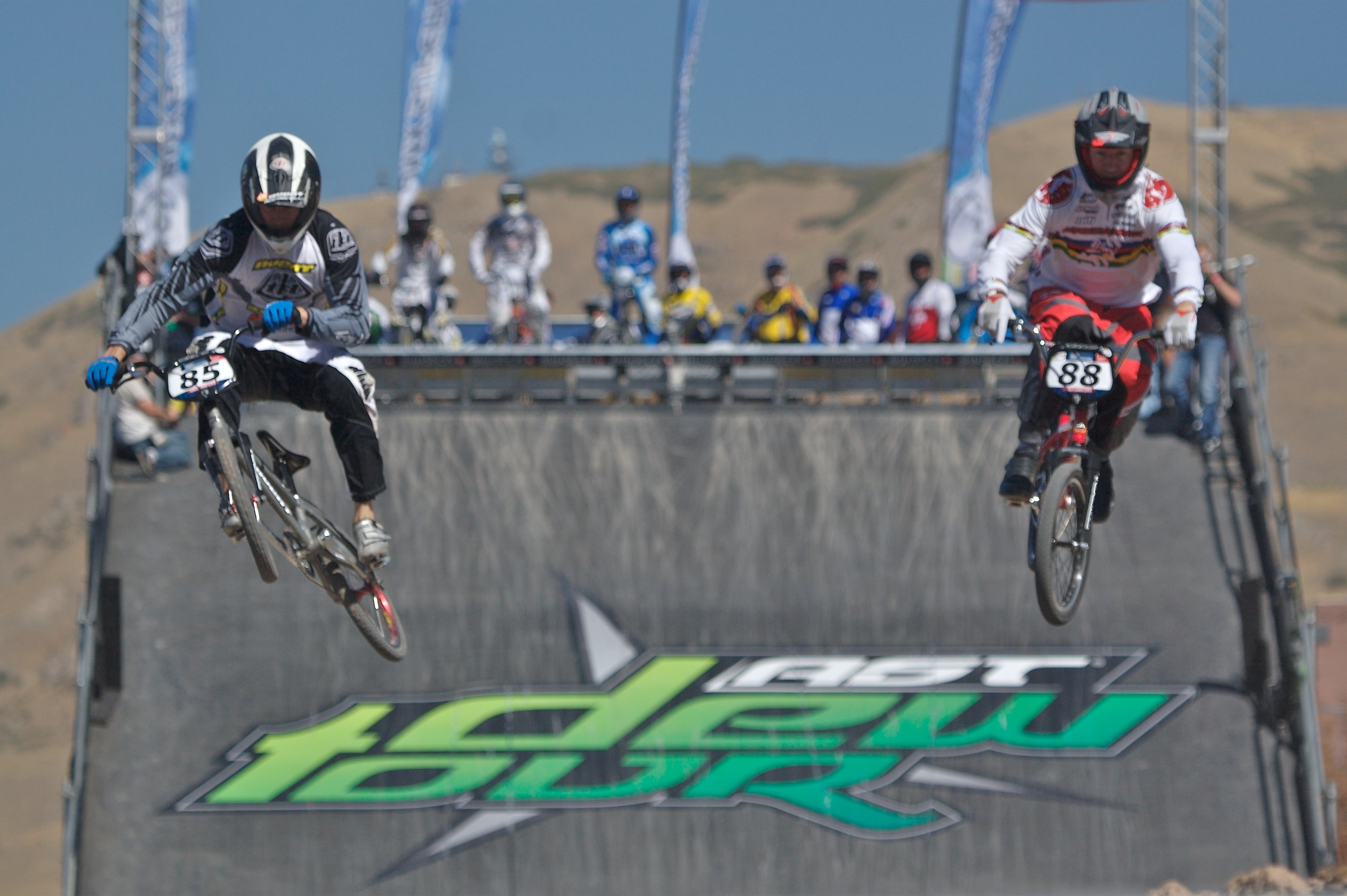
2007 Dew Tour BMX in Salt Lake City, Utah

Sponsorship of action sports athletes has been a part of Mountain Dew marketing since the late 1990s, with present sponsorship including Eli Reed (skateboarder), Paul Rodriguez (skateboarder), and Danny Davis (snowboarder). Mountain Dew also sponsors its namesake festival, "The Dew Tour", which is an action sports tour made up of events held in five U.S. cities over several months. The first Dew Tour was held in the summer of 2005 with events in skateboarding, BMX and Freestyle Motocross. In 2008, it expanded to add a "Winter Dew Tour", comprising snowboarding and snow skiing competitions. It is "the most watched and attended action sports event in the world," according to Transworld Snowboarding magazine. In coordination with its Dew Tour sponsorship, a sponsored television show entitled Mountain Dew's Green Label Experience premiered on Fuel TV in July 2010 for the primary purpose of broadcasting interviews with action sports athletes from each of the stops on the Dew Tour.

== Green Label Gaming ==
Under the term Green Label Gaming – coined in 2007 – Mountain Dew broadened its sponsorship of independent video game designers and players. The brand is often the subject of media attention for its popularity among video game enthusiasts, as several flavors of Mountain Dew have been produced in partnership with video games. In December 2008, Mountain Dew produced a 30-minute television special which documented independent gamers in Japan and the U.S., which aired on the Spike TV network. In 2009, Mountain Dew sponsored two prominent gaming events: the Independent Games Festival and the Game Developers Conference. Green Label Gaming went under controversy over a sponsored Game Jam-themed reality show by Matti Leshem.
