= Kevin Beacham =

American rapper, producer and DJ

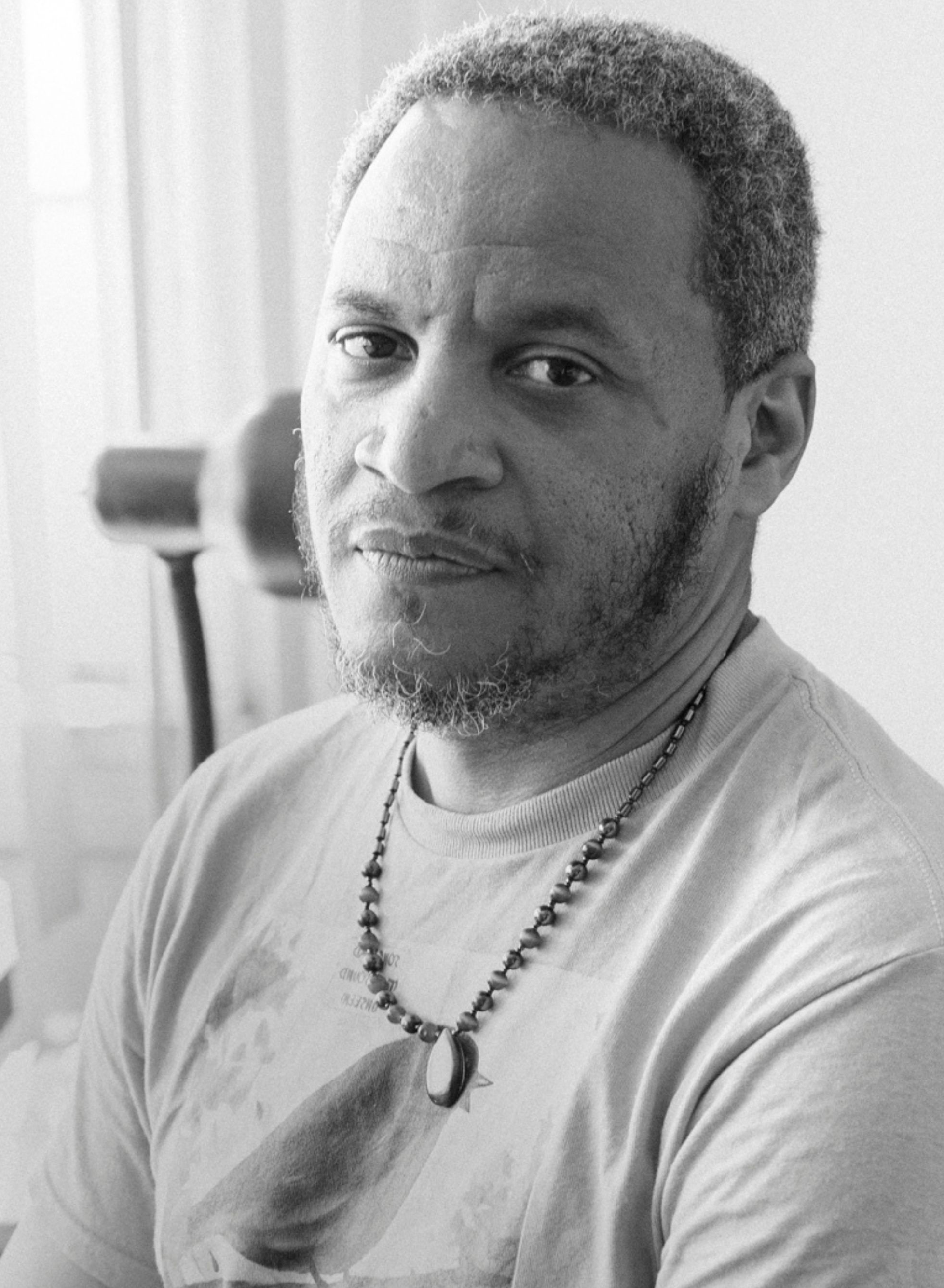

Background information
- Also known as: 7x3=21
- Born: Frankfurt, Germany
- Genres: Hip hop
- Occupation: Singer-songwriter
- Instruments: Rapping
- Years active: 1980–present
- Labels: Rhymesayers Entertainment

Kevin Beacham, also known as 7x3=21 (born in Frankfurt) is an American rapper, producer, DJ, and archivist. He is known for organizing the Scribble Jam battle Hip-Hop event.

== Biography ==
Kevin Beacham is known for organizing the Scribble Jam battles from 1997 to 2009. He first got his start in radio in April 1995 on WNUR 89.3 at Northwestern University in Evanston, Illinois. His show "Time Travel" was a conceptual hip-hop show that used the music as a medium to educate listeners about the culture of hip hop, the artists and pioneers that were involved, and the many factors surrounding it. He moved to Minneapolis in 2002 to help manage the Rhymesayers Entertainment Record Label. Currently, Kevin makes his return to radio with Redefinition Radio where he hopes to continue to entertain and educate people on hip-hop culture and rap music.

Beacham also worked as a DJ for a while, known as DJ Nikoless, DJing for artists like Eyedea during the release of Oliver Hart. Kevin Beacham also had a radio show in Chicago, where he played various Hip-Hop songs from groups such as Atmosphere. He has also worked as an archivist, documenting Midwest hip-hop since he formed the group "Wildstyle" in 1987.

Kevin Beacham also writes and records music as an MC under the name 7x3=21. In 2023, he released the EP "In Absence of Mere Force" along with DJ Mikec. He also released the single "Sequelando" with brazilian music producer and beatmaker Emtee Beats. Beacham also hosts a hip-hop program on The Current.

== Discography ==
=== Studio albums ===
- Songbird (The Sound Unseen) (2022)
- In Absence of Mere Force (2023)

=== Videos ===
- 2023 - What Gives (The Build or Destroy Theory)
- 2023 - Sequelando (with Emtee Beats)
