= Bad Vibes (Shlohmo album) =

Studio album by Shlohmo
- Released: August 9, 2011
- Genre: Electronic
- Length: 57:45
- Label: Friends of Friends
- Producer: Shlohmo

Shlohmo chronology
Bad Vibes (2011)	Dark Red (2015)

Bad Vibes is the debut studio album by American electronic musician Shlohmo. It was released through Friends of Friends on August 9, 2011.

== Critical reception ==
Professional ratings
Aggregate scores
Source	Rating
Metacritic	82/100
Review scores
Source	Rating
Beats Per Minute	83%
CMJ	favorable
Consequence of Sound	B
Exclaim!	favorable
Fact	4/5 stars
Filter	84%
Pitchfork	7.8/10
Resident Advisor	4.5/5
Spin	7/10
XLR8R	7.5/10

At Metacritic, which assigns a weighted average score out of 100 to reviews from mainstream critics, the album received an average score of 82, based on 7 reviews, indicating "universal acclaim".

David Dacks of Exclaim! gave the album a favorable review, describing Shlohmo as "a master sound artist with funky, song-oriented underpinnings making it all sound relevant." Ari Lipsitz of CMJ commented that the album is "more melodic and less frenzied" in comparison with Flying Lotus' work.

LA Weekly placed the album at number 6 on the "Top 10 Los Angeles Albums of 2011" list.

== Track listing ==
No.	Title	Length
1.	"Big Feelings"	3:30
2.	"Places"	5:02
3.	"Anywhere but Here"	3:37
4.	"It Was Whatever"	4:04
5.	"Parties"	5:24
6.	"Just Us"	4:06
7.	"Sink"	5:08
8.	"I Can't See You I'm Dead"	4:40
9.	"Trapped in a Burning House"	3:58
10.	"Get Out"	4:36
11.	"Your Stupid Face"	4:45
12.	"Seriously"	3:10
13.	"Same Time"	5:45
