= D33J =

American record producer

- Born: Djavan Santos; October 30, 1990 (age 35); Los Angeles, California, U.S.
- Occupation: Record producer
- Years active: 2011–present
- Musical career
- Genre: Electronic
- Labels: Wedidit; Anticon

Djavan Santos (born October 30, 1990), better known by his stage name D33J, is an American record producer based in Los Angeles, California. He is a member of the Wedidit collective. He has collaborated with ASAP Rocky, Tory Lanez and Lil Yachty.

== Early life ==
Djavan Santos was born and raised in Los Angeles, California. He studied guitar and electronic music at Alexander Hamilton High School.

== Career ==
D33J remixed Kid Smpl's "Pulse" off of Escape Pod. In October 2012, it was announced that he got signed to the Anticon label. His first extended play (EP), Tide Songs, was re-released on the label in early 2013. He released the second EP, Gravel, later that year. In 2017, D33J released his debut studio album, Death Valley Oasis. It included guest appearances from Deradoorian, Baths, Corbin, and Shlohmo. In 2020, he released the single "Designer Boi".

== Discography ==
=== Studio albums ===
- Death Valley Oasis (2017)

=== Mixtapes ===
- Infinity 33 (2018)

=== EPs ===
- Tide Songs (2011)
- Gravel (2013)
- Gravel Remixed (2015)

=== Guest appearances ===
- Shlohmo - "Apathy" from Dark Red (2015)
- Joji - "Why Am I Still in LA" from Ballads 1 (2018)
- ASAP Nast - "Designer Boi" (2020)

=== Productions ===
- Tory Lanez - "Honda Civic" from Cruel Intentions (2015)
- Tory Lanez - "Honda Civic" from I Told You (Deluxe only) (2016)
- Lil Yachty - "IDK" from Summer Songs 2 (2016)
- Lil Yachty - "Like a Star" from Teenage Emotions (2017)
- Corbin - Mourn (2017)
- Joji - "Why Am I Still in LA" from Ballads 1 (2018)
- Bad Gyal – Worldwide Angel (2018)
- ASAP Rocky – "D.M.B." (2022)

=== Remixes ===
- Kid Smpl - "Pulse (D33J Remix)" from Escape Pod (2012)
- El Ten Eleven - "Lullaby (D33J Remix)" from Transitions Remixed (2013)
