= Dua Saleh =

Sudanese-American singer and actor

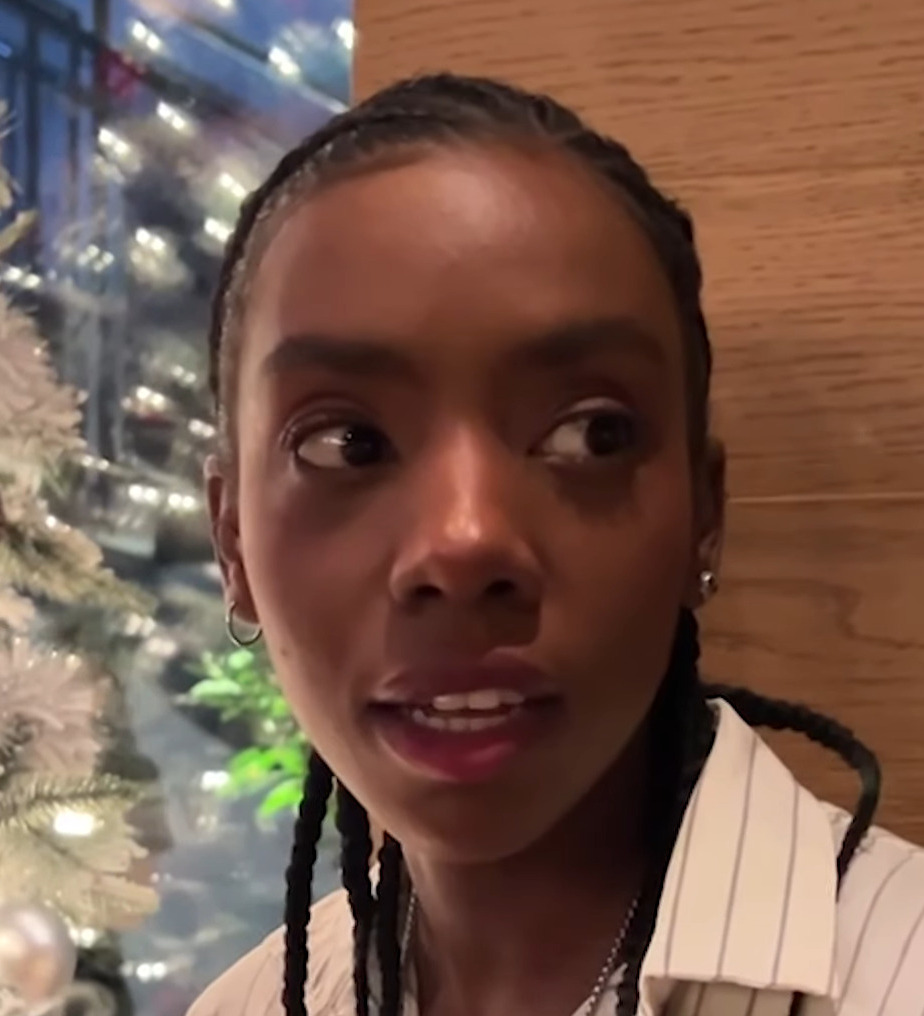
- Saleh in 2023

Background information
- Also known as: Dua
- Born: Kassala, Sudan
- Origin: Minneapolis–Saint Paul, Minnesota, U.S.
- Genres: Rap; pop; R&B
- Occupations: Singer; actor
- Years active: 2017–present
- Label: Against Giants
- Website: www.duasaleh.com

Dua Saleh (Arabic: دعاء صالح Du'ā' Ṣāliḥ, Sudanese Arabic pronunciation: [duʕæː(ʔ) sˤɑːleħ]) is a Sudanese-American singer and actor based in Minneapolis, Minnesota. They released their debut EP in 2019 followed by two additional EPs in 2020 and 2021, and their first studio album in 2024.

Saleh, who came to the United States from Sudan as a child, wrote poetry from an early age. While attending Augsburg University, they began to experiment with music, eventually releasing a demo in 2017. Shortly after, they began to work with local producer Psymun and began performing their music live, culminating in their 2019 EP release. Their music has been characterized as rap, pop, and R&B, although they have also been described as defying genres. In addition to writing and recording music, Saleh has also acted in theater in Minneapolis and is known for their recurring role as Cal Bowman in the Netflix series Sex Education.

== Early life ==
Saleh was born in Kassala, Sudan, to a family with Tunjur heritage, who are originally from Chad/Darfur. Saleh's family became refugees of the Second Sudanese Civil War in the 1990s. They fled Sudan when Saleh was five years old and moved several times, first to Eritrea, then to North Dakota, Maine, and Newark, New Jersey, before settling in the Rondo neighborhood of Saint Paul, Minnesota. Saleh attended Saint Paul Central High School and has cited an awareness of danger, systemic oppression, and resistance in their upbringing as a source for their interest in community organizing.

After graduating from high school, Saleh studied at Augsburg University where they double-majored in sociology and gender, women's, and sexuality studies. During their time at Augsburg, they led a walkout from their former high school through the St. Paul Youth and Collegiate Branch of the NAACP in protest of the school-to-prison pipeline at Central. Saleh has also been involved with Neighborhoods Organizing for Change, the Pan Afrikan Student Union, the Minnesota Public Interest Research Group, and Augsburg's LGBTQIA Student Services. They graduated from Augsburg in 2017.

== Career ==
Saleh began writing poetry when they were four years old and performed at their first open mic in their senior year of high school. They used poetry to process experiences in their life and continued performing around the Minneapolis–Saint Paul area while in school at Augsburg. Their poem "Pins and Needles" was recorded and shared on Button Poetry's YouTube channel where it garnered tens of thousands of views by 2017 and over one hundred thousand by 2018. They have also performed as part of the Queer Voices series at Intermedia Arts.

While studying at Augsburg and working full-time, Saleh began to find that poetry was not giving them "enough nurturing sustenance". They said of this time that "I was trying to do way too much, and my body was just like, 'No, you need to release something.' The melodies started coming in, and I think that was my body reacting and wanting to heal me, in some ways." Saleh did not consider themself to be a proficient singer but connected via a mutual friend to producer Mike Frey to experiment with recording. In Frey's home studio, he played a four-bar beat that Saleh mumbled over until Saleh announced they were ready to record; Frey expected four or eight bars from Saleh but Saleh ended up performing an entire track in a single take, with Frey manually extending the beat to keep up as Saleh sang. According to Frey, the resulting single take was "such a good performance that we decided this is what we're going to run with"; it was released on May 10, 2017, as "First Take", Saleh's first single, under the stage name Dua.

Following the single's release, Minneapolis producer Psymun reached out to Saleh about working together; this surprised Saleh who was familiar with Psymun's work but thought he was based in the United Kingdom. "First Take" was well-received online and was followed by the release of Saleh's first Psymun-produced single, a performance at the Eaux Claires festival, and a collaboration with Florida rapper Chester Watson ("Void Interlude").

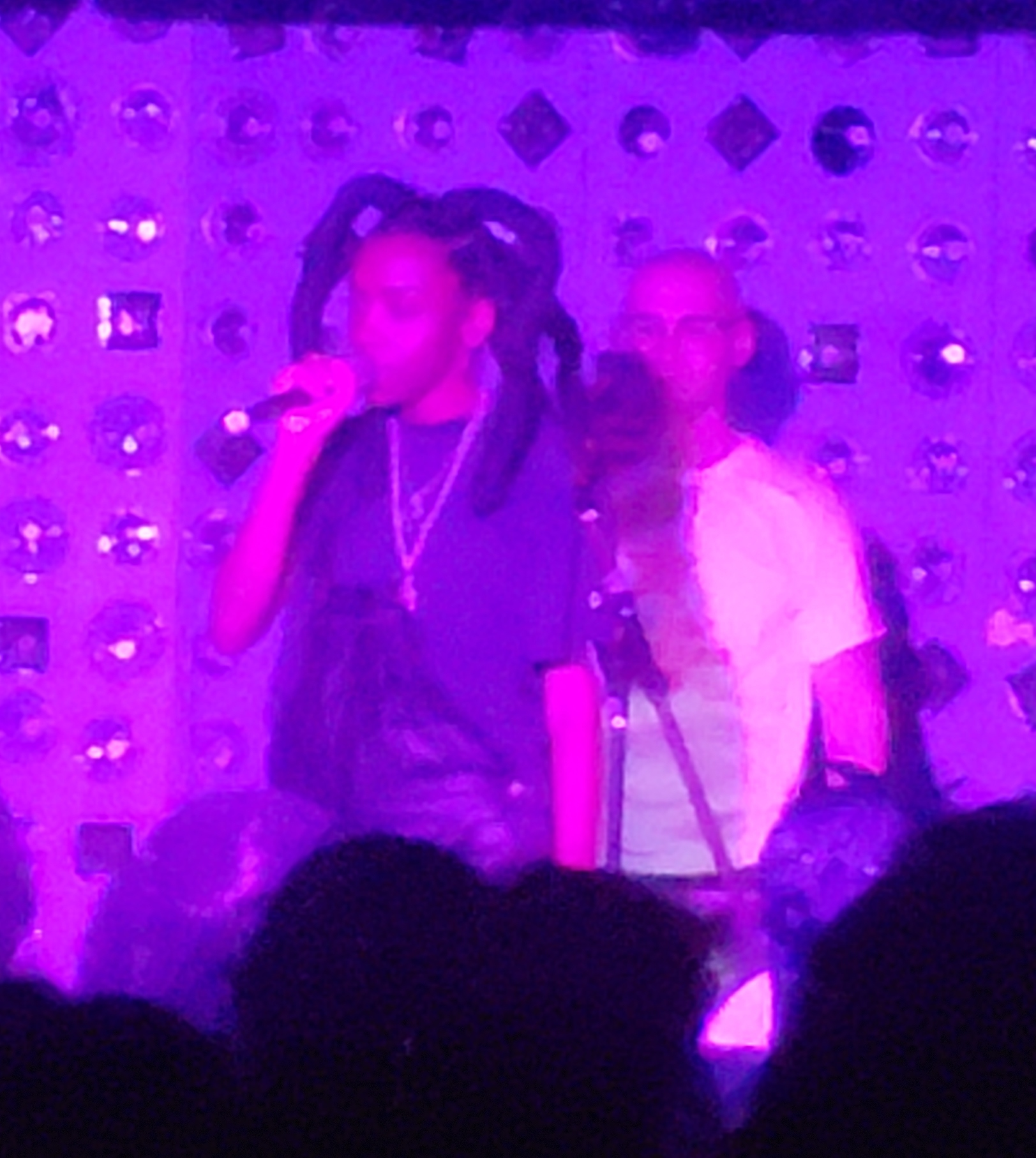
Saleh performing in 2022

Saleh stated they were not in a rush to put out music but that by October 2018, they had "a lot of fuckin' songs" recorded and intended to release an EP later in the year. Local alternative newspaper City Pages listed Saleh at number four that year on their annual Picked to Click list of new artists the publication's writers were excited about. Saleh's debut EP, Nūr, was released on January 3, 2019, on the Against Giants label under their full name, Dua Saleh. The five-track Nūr received positive reviews from Pitchfork and Robert Christgau and was supported by a music video release for the song "Warm Pants" that April. They released two more videos that year, for "Sugar Mama" in October and for their new single "Pretty Kitten" in December.

By early 2020, Saleh was noted in the Minnesota Daily as having a national following. Saleh characterized their musical success as feeling like an accident to them, and said that they were still in the process of developing their identity as a musician. Their next EP, Rosetta, was released in June 2020 and their third, Crossover, came out October 2021.

On May 30, 2020, Saleh released the single "body cast" to address police brutality. Proceeds from the song's download on Bandcamp are being donated to the Minneapolis-based justice organization, Black Visions Collective. The track includes audio clips from a 2019 viral video of Angela Whitehead standing up to police who illegally entered her home. The song's video lists the names of unarmed African Americans killed by the police.

Saleh released their first album, I Should Call Them, in October 2024. A concept album about two lovers meeting, breaking up, and meeting again while the world ends, Saleh cowrote the 11 tracks on the record with Emma DD and Josef Lamercier. Featured artists on the 1Mind-produced I Should Call Them include Ambré, serpentwithfeet, Gallant, and Sid Sriram.

On February 3, 2026 they released "Flood" / "Glow", featuring Bon Iver, as the lead singles to their second album, Of Earth & Wires, which was released May 15, 2026.

In addition to writing and performing music and poetry, Saleh has also acted, including in 20% Theatre Company's November 2018 production of Waafrika 123 in Minneapolis. Saleh was cast in the third season of Netflix's comedy-drama Sex Education as the recurring character Cal. They returned for the fourth season, which was released in 2023.

== Musical style and influences ==
"Sugar Mama"
Audio sample of the single "Sugar Mama", from Saleh's debut EP Nūr. Saleh sings about a neighbor with a rich father.

Saleh lived what they described as a "super-sheltered" childhood, and grew up listening mostly to older Sudanese music and Nancy Ajram. In high school, when they got a laptop, they listened to a great deal of jazz from the 1940s and later turned their attention to 1990s hip hop. Subsequently, Saleh "went through a year or two of finding as many queer artists as [they] could", citing Mykki Blanco, Le1f, and Kilo Kish among the artists during this period who "saved [their] life". They have also cited the music and lives of Sister Rosetta Tharpe and Marie Knight as influences, including naming their second EP after Tharpe.

Saleh said that among other reasons for making music, "[i]n Sudan, there's a lot of queer, trans and non-binary people who are closeted, so I try to put out as much content that's like, the gay and trans agenda, as possible!" On Rosetta, Saleh released the track "Smut", sung partially in Arabic, hoping "to break into the Sudani market" and connect with Sudanese listeners.

Saleh's music has been categorized as rap, pop, and R&B. Christgau described Saleh's performance style on Nūr as rap-singing while Michelle Kim characterized their vocal performance style as alternating "between deliciously tactile rapping and spellbinding singing". Saleh also been noted for defying genre in their music.

== Personal life ==
Saleh's first language was Arabic, which they said in 2017 was a "struggle to maintain" because of their immersion in English. Saleh is Muslim, but they do not consider themself "religious in the institutional sense". They have discussed their relationship with traditions of Islamic attire, stating that traditional "attire isn't reflective of [their] personal relationship with the deen, but reflective of the image of a Muslim that [they've] been indoctrinated to believe is socially accepted". In high school, they were elected vice president of Central's gay–straight alliance; when their mother discovered pamphlets for the organization in their backpack, she sent Saleh to Dugsi Academy, an Islamic charter school in Saint Paul.

Saleh is non-binary and uses they/them and xe/xim/xyr pronouns. They came out as non-binary while in their second year at Augsburg but have said they have "always been on gay shit". They live in Minneapolis.

== Discography ==
=== Studio albums ===
- I Should Call Them (2024)
- Of Earth & Wires (2026)

=== EPs ===
- Nūr (2019)
- Rosetta (2020)
- Crossover (2021)
