= WESLEE =

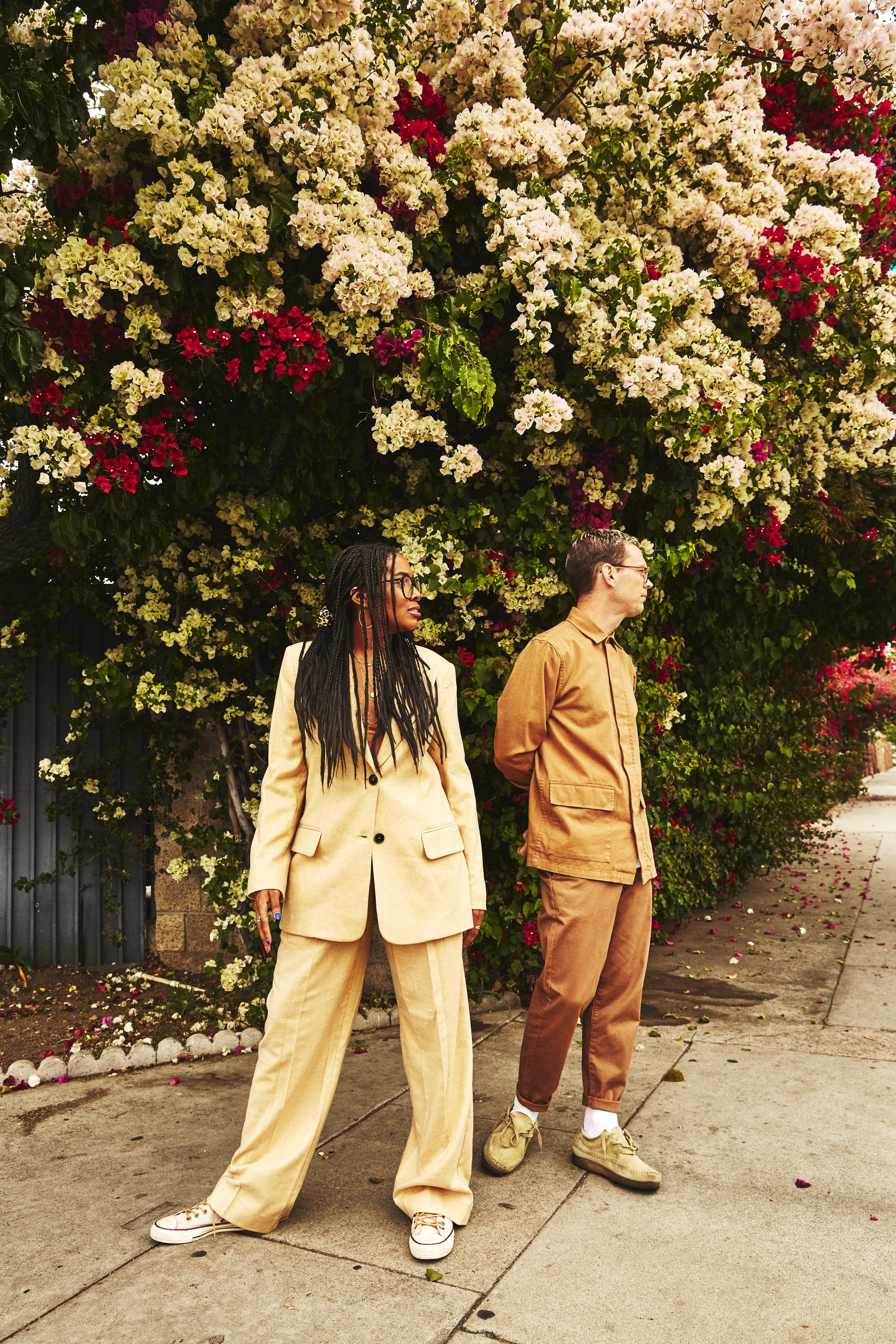

Background information
- Genres: Alternative/experimental R&B, electro-pop
- Members: Emma DD; Josh Grant

WESLEE is an R&B duo consisting of vocalist Emma DD and producer Josh Grant. Having met in New York, the two released their first critically acclaimed single "Gassed" in 2017 (with over 5 million worldwide streams to date).

== Career ==
Producer Josh first met Emma when she relocated from London to New York City back in 2014. They wrote their debut track "Gassed" during one of their first sessions together. "Gassed" was featured on an episode of 'You're the Worst', a drama series on FX. "Boy Like You" was used at the end of Grey's Anatomy. They supported Jessie Ware at Annie Mac Presents in February. WESLEE have also released "Bathwater", and "Tongue Tied", in their EP "9F"; following up with singles "London Love", "Something Bout You", "Venus" and "Peaches".

== Artistry ==
Emma has said that they "never wanted to be artists", yet her and Josh's mutual love for Tracy Chapman and Kwabs lead to them creating WESLEE, named after Emma's childhood pet terrapin.
