= Allan Kingdom =

Canadian rapper and record producer

- Born: Allan Kyariga; January 6, 1994 (age 32); Winnipeg, Manitoba, Canada
- Origin: Saint Paul, Minnesota, U.S.
- Genre: Twin Cities hip-hop
- Occupations: Rapper; record producer
- Years active: 2011–present
- Labels: So Cold; Empire
- Member of: Thestand4rd

Allan Kyariga (born January 6, 1994), better known by his stage name Allan Kingdom, is a Canadian rapper and record producer based in Saint Paul, Minnesota. He was a member of Thestand4rd along with Bobby Raps, Corbin, and Psymun. He is best known for guest performing alongside Theophilus London and Paul McCartney on Kanye West's 2015 single "All Day", which received two Grammy Award nominations.

== Early life ==
Allan Kyariga was born in Winnipeg, Manitoba, Canada, to a South African father and a Tanzanian mother. In his youth, he moved to the United States to Wisconsin, and eventually to Saint Paul, Minnesota. He studied at Woodbury High School, Creative Arts High School, and Minneapolis Institute of Production and Recording.

== Career ==
In earlier releases, Kyariga used various aliases, including King Kyariga, The Northern Gentleman, and Peanut Butter Prince.

Allan Kingdom's official debut mixtape, Trucker Music, was released in 2011. He was named "Best Hip Hop Artist of 2014" by City Pages. He was listed on Complex's "25 New Rappers to Watch Out For in 2014".

In 2016, he released Northern Lights, which featured guest appearances from Chronixx, Jared Evan, DRAM, and Gloss Gang. In 2017, he released Lines.

== Influences ==
In a 2015 interview with Green Label, Allan Kingdom cited Kid Cudi, Kanye West, and Pharrell Williams as his biggest influences.

== Discography ==
=== Studio albums ===
- Thestand4rd (2014) (with Bobby Raps, Corbin, and Psymun, as Thestand4rd)
- Lines (2017)
- Allanstein (2023)

=== Mixtapes ===
- Trucker Music (2011)
- Talk to Strangers (2013)
- Future Memoirs (2014)
- Northern Lights (2016)

=== EPs ===
- Pinkspire Lane (2012)
- Peanut Butter Prince (2018)
- I Don't Do This for Money (2020)
- FR3NZ (2023)
- A Laboratory Moment (2024)

=== Guest appearances ===
- Finding Novyon - "Lots" from #TheFoodNetwork (2015)
- Cœur de pirate - "I Don't Want to Break Your Heart" from Roses (2015)
- Jay Prince - "Juice" from Beautiful Mercy (2015)
- Kanye West - "All Day" (2015)
- SolomonDaGod - "ICEGAF" (2015)
- Flume - "You Know" from Skin (2016)
- Jared Evan - "The End Game" from The Blanket Truth (2016)
- No Wyld - "Tomorrow" from Nomads (2016)
- P.O.S - "Sleepdrone/Superposition" from Chill, Dummy (2017)
- Kweku Collins - "Aya" from Grey (2017)
- Finding Novyon - "Tall Hills" from That's My Dawg (2017)
- Nightmares on Wax - "Citizen Kane (Rap Version)" (2017)
- Getter - "Numb" from Visceral (2018)
- SebastiAn - "Yebo" from Thirst (2019)
- 1982 - "Does It All Even Matter" from The Quarantine (2020)
