= Shlohmo =

American musical artist (born 1990)

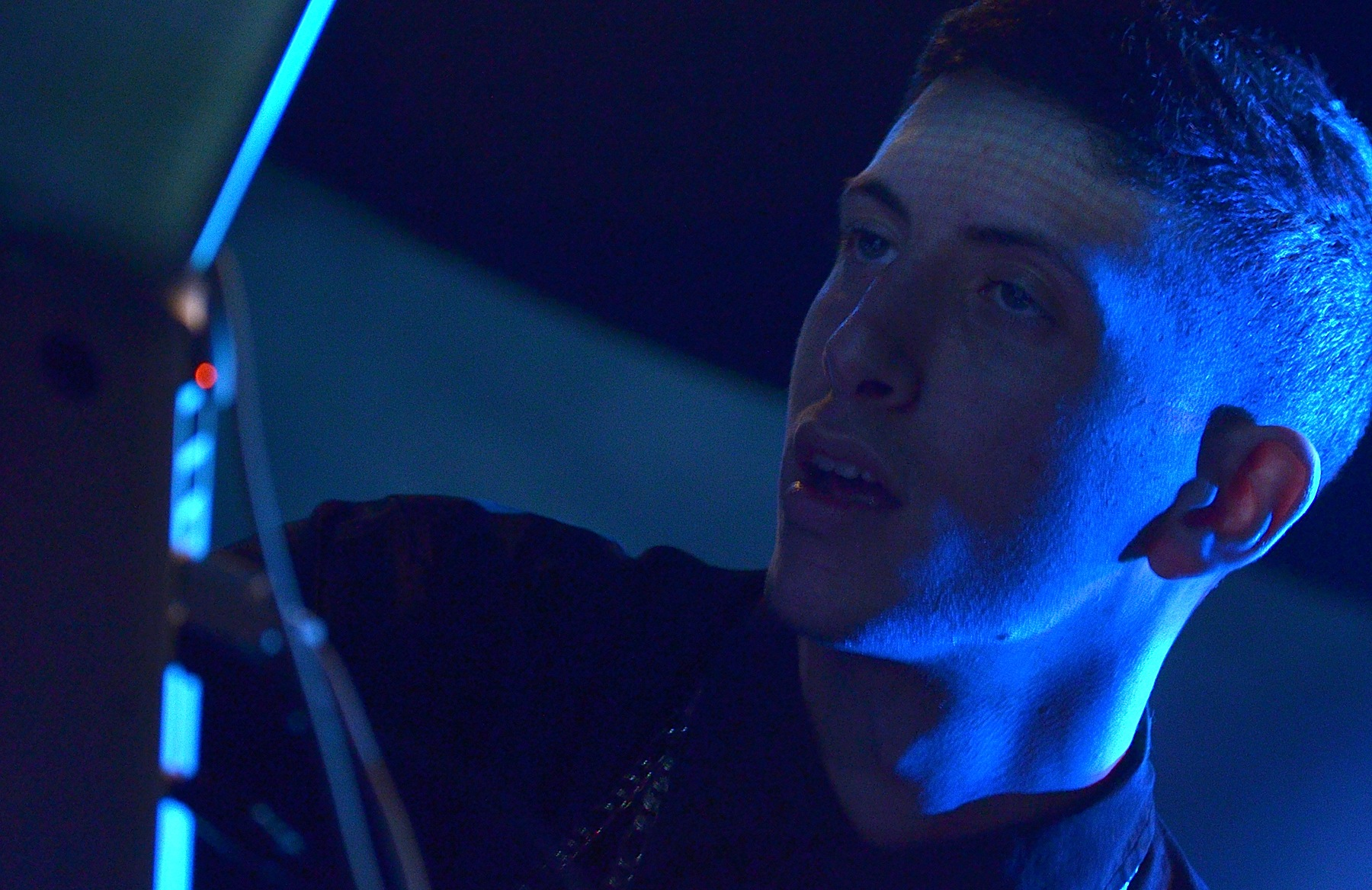

Background information
- Born: Henry Laufer; January 3, 1990 (age 36); Los Angeles, California
- Occupation: Record producer
- Years active: 2009–present
- Labels: Friends of Friends; WeDidIt; Error Broadcast; True Panther

Henry Laufer (born January 3, 1990), known professionally as Shlohmo, is an American musician and record producer based in Los Angeles, California. Laufer co-founded the record label WeDidIt Records.

Shlohmo is associated with the Los Angeles beat music scene of the mid-2000s, alongside other producers such as Flying Lotus, Nosaj Thing, Knxwledge, Tokimonsta, and Teebs. Shlohmo has released four studio albums—‌Bad Vibes (2011), Dark Red (2015), The End (2019) and Repulsor (2025), alongside various EPs and collaborative projects.

== Early life ==
Laufer attended Crossroads School, a private high school in Santa Monica, California, where he met Nick Meledandri, the co-founder of the Wedidit music collective. Laufer briefly enrolled at the California College of the Arts to study drawing and painting. He left college following the release of his Shlomoshun EP in 2010, which led to an album deal with the Los Angeles-based label Friends of Friends.

== Career ==
Shlohmo released his debut EP Shlo-Fi in 2009. In 2011, his release Bad Vibes gained critical recognition from platforms like Pitchfork and Resident Advisor. He later released several EPs, including Vacation (2012) and Laid Out (2013). Shlohmo gained attention for remixes of tracks like Drake and the Weeknd's "Crew Love" and Banks' "Brain".

In 2014, Shlohmo collaborated with Jeremih on the joint EP No More and in 2015, he released his second studio album Dark Red. During this time period, Shlohmo produced music for Tory Lanez, Corbin, and Yung Lean. In 2017, he executive-produced Corbin's debut LP, Mourn.

In 2018, he worked on and contributed to Joji's debut album Ballads 1. His third LP, The End, was released in March 2019 through the Friends of Friends label.

In 2021, Shlohmo worked on Drake's sixth studio album, Certified Lover Boy.

Shlohmo released Repulsor in 2025. The album was preceded by "Chore Boy", a single featuring contributions from the American duo SALEM. The album received positive reviews from critics, with Pitchfork's Brady Brickner-Wood writing that the album showcases Shlohmo "dialing up the distortion, flooding his beats with overdriven synths, and pushing anxious moods into the red".

== Discography ==
=== Studio albums ===
- Bad Vibes (2011)
- Dark Red (2015)
- The End (2019)
- Repulsor (2025)

=== Compilation albums ===
- Shlomoshun Deluxe (2010)
- Shlo-Fi (Deluxe) (2011)
- Fine, Thanks (2011)
- Bad Vibes – 5th Anniversary Addition (2016)
- Bad Vibes: Rarities + Extras (2016)

=== EPs ===
- Shlo-Fi (2009)
- Beat CD 09 (2010)
- Shlomoshun (2010)
- Camping (2010)
- Places (2011)
- Vacation (2012)
- Laid Out (2013)
- No More (2014) (with Jeremih)
- Rock Music (2019)
- Heaven Inc. (2020)

=== Singles ===
- "Sippy Cup" b/w "Post Atmosphere (Baths Remix)" (2010)
- "Places" b/w "Seriously" (2011)
- "Later" (2011)
- "Bo Peep (Do U Right)" (2013) (with Jeremih)
- "No More" (2013) (with Jeremih)
- "Emerge from Smoke" (2014)
- "Buried" (2015)
- "Wen 222" (2018)
- "The End" (2019)
- "Looking at Plants" (2020)
- "Chore Boy" (feat. SALEM) (2025)

=== Productions ===
- Flash Bang Grenada - "Hyperbolic" from 10 Haters (2011)
- Banks - "Brain" from Goddess (2014)
- Tory Lanez - "Acting Like" from Cruel Intentions (2015)
- Post Malone - "Boy Bandz" (2015)
- SilkMoney - "The Fine Household" (feat. Cyrax & Lord Linco) (2015)
- Star Wars - "Druid Caravan of Smoke" from Star Wars Headspace (2015)
- Lil Yachty - “Ice Water” (2016)
- Kane Grocerys - "Columbine Homicide" (with D33J) (2016)
- Adamn Killa - "Jeremy Lin" from Back 2 Ballin (2016)
- Adamn Killa - "Ten" (feat. Yung Lean) (single) (2016)
- Yung Lean - "Hop Out" (feat. Luckaleannn) from Frost God (2016)
- Corbin - "Ice Boy" (with D33J) (2017)
- Joji - "WHY AM I STILL IN LA" (with D33J) (2018)
- Joji - "COME THRU" (2018)
- Salem - "Red River" from Fires in Heaven (2020)

=== Remixes ===
- Robot Koch - "Gorom Sen (Shlohmo Remix)" from Death Star Droid Remix EP (2010)
- Gonjasufi - "Change (Shlohmo Remix)" from The Caliph's Tea Party (2010)
- Comfort Fit - "Sky Raper (Shlohmo Remix)" (2010)
- Burial - "Shell of Light (Shlohmo Remix)" (2011)
- Drake - "Marvin's Room (Shlohmo's thru tha floor remix)" (2011)
- Drake - "I'm On One (Shlohmo Remix)" (2011)
- Drake ft. the Weeknd - "Crew Love (Shlohmo Remix)" (2012)
- Salva - "Yellobone (Shlohmo + 2KWTVR Remix)" from Yellobone (2011)
- Tomas Barfod - "Broken Glass (Shlohmo Remix)" (2011)
- Aaliyah feat. Drake - "Enough Said (Shlohmo Remix)" (2012)
- Lianne La Havas - "Forget (Shlohmo Remix)" (2012)
- Little Dragon - "Sunshine (Shlohmo Remix)" (2012)
- LOL Boys - "Changes (Shlohmo Remix)" from Changes (2012)
- Flume - "Sleepless (Shlohmo Remix)" (2012)
- Ryan Hemsworth - "Colour & Movement (Shlohmo Remix)" from Last Words (2012)
- Haerts - "Wings (Shlohmo Remix)" (2013)
- Samo Sound Boy - "Your Love (Shlohmo Remix)" (2013)
- Young Scooter - "Colombia (Shlohmo Remix)" (2013)
- Just Friends - "Avalanche (Shlohmo Remix)" (2013)
- Electric Guest - "The Bait (Shlohmo Remix)" (2013)
- Laura Mvula - "She (Shlohmo Remix)" (2013)
- Purple - "The Club (Shlohmo Remix)" (2013)
- Jeremih - "Fuck You All The Time (Shlohmo Remix)" (2013)
- Perera Elsewhere - "Light Bulb (Shlohmo Remix)" (2014)
- Tory Lanez - "Say It (Shlohmo Remix)" (2016)
- Gucci Mane - "Hot (Shlohmo Remix)" (2016)
- PnB Rock - "Selfish (Shlohmo Remix)" (2017)
- Juice Jackal - "Looney Toon (Shlohmo Remix)" (2018)
