= Psymun =

- Born: Simon Christensen
- Origin: Minnesota, U.S.
- Genres: Hip hop; R&B
- Occupation: Record producer
- Years active: 2009–present
- Labels: MJMJ Records; Ghostly International; Gauzy
- Website: psymun.bandcamp.com

Simon Christensen, better known by his stage name Psymun, is an American record producer based in Minnesota. He was a member of Thestand4rd alongside Allan Kingdom, Bobby Raps, and Corbin.

== Early life and education ==
Christensen graduated from Saint Paul Central High School. He worked at a restaurant from the age of 14 to 23.

== Career ==
In 2013, Psymun released a collaborative album with singer K.Raydio, titled LucidDreamingSkylines. His 2017 EP, Rainbow Party, was released on Ghostly International.

== Discography ==
=== Studio albums ===
- Awfully Nice (2010) (with Prhym8)
- Serious Sauce Vol. 3 (2013) (with Damacha)
- LucidDreamingSkylines (2013) (with K.Raydio)
- Thestand4rd (2014) (with Allan Kingdom, Bobby Raps, and Corbin, as Thestand4rd)

=== Compilation albums ===
- Tape (2018)

=== EPs ===
- Rik Strrling (2012)
- Turtle Tape (2013)
- Paws (2013)
- Heartsick (2013)
- Pink Label (2014)
- Rainbow Party (2017)

=== Productions ===
- Coss – "Let's Begin Part 2" from Sleepwalking (2011)
- Allan Kingdom – "Wavey" from Future Memoirs (2014)
- Chester Watson – "Dead Albatross", "Chinamen", and "Picbascassquiato" from Past Cloaks (2016)
- Greg Grease – "Migraine" from Down So Long (2017)
- Dizzy Fae – Free Form (2018)
- Swamp Dogg – "I'm Coming with Lovin' on My Mind" and "$$$ Huntin'" from Love, Loss, and Auto-Tune (2018)
- Future & Juice Wrld – "Fine China" from Wrld on Drugs (2018)
- Young Thug & YSL Records – "Chanel (Go Get It)" from Slime Language (2018)
- Banks – "The Fall" from III (2019)
- Dizzy Fae – No GMO (2019)
- Dua Saleh – "Albany", "Warm Pants", "Survival", and "Kickflip" from Nūr (2019)
- Velvet Negroni – Neon Brown (2019)
- Poliça – "Tata" and "Forget Me Now" from When We Stay Alive (2020)
- Gunna – "Do Better" from Wunna (2020)
- Jean Dawson – "Poster Child" from Pixel Bath (2020)
- Santigold – "High Priestess" from Spirituals (2022)
- Midwxst – "Lost" from E3 (2023)
