= Wheezy production discography =

This is the discography of American record producer, Wheezy. It includes a list of songs produced, co-produced and remixed by year, artists, album and title.

== Charted singles ==
Title	Year	Peak chart positions							Album
Title	Year	US	US R&B/HH	AUS	CAN	IRE	SWE	UK	Album
"Yes Indeed" (Lil Baby and Drake)	2018	6	5	68	7	65	91	46	Harder Than Ever
"Fine China" (Future and Juice Wrld)	2018	26	14	85	24	54	54	55	Wrld on Drugs
"Crushed Up" (Future)	2019	43	18	—	41	—	—	—	The Wizrd
"Going Bad" (Meek Mill featuring Drake)	2019	6	2	32	3	19	60	13	Championships
"Space Cadet" (Metro Boomin featuring Gunna)	2019	51	22	—	40	—	—	—	Not All Heroes Wear Capes
"Baby" (Quality Control, Lil Baby, and DaBaby)	2019	21	11	—	54	—	—	—	Control the Streets, Volume 2
"Mac 10" (Trippie Redd featuring Lil Baby and Lil Duke)	2019	64	24	—	93	—	—	—	!
"Mood Swings" (A Boogie wit da Hoodie)	2019	76	32	—	61	—	—	—	Artist 2.0
"Hot" (Young Thug featuring Gunna and Travis Scott)	2019	11	5	49	18	44	93	52	So Much Fun
"Turks" (Nav and Gunna featuring Travis Scott)	2020	17	9	—	45	60	—	54	Good Intentions
"Tycoon" (Future)	2020	76	37	—	—	—	—	—	High Off Life
"Blind" (DaBaby featuring Young Thug)	2020	74	30	—	82	—	—	—	Blame It on Baby
"Young Wheezy" (Nav and Gunna)	2021	84	34	—	51	—	—	—	Emergency Tsunami
"Too Easy" (Gunna and Future)	2021	16	13	—	43	—	—	—	DS4Ever

== Other charted songs ==
Title	Year	Peak chart positions						Album
Title	Year	US	US R&B/HH	CAN	IRE	NZ Hot	UK	Album
"We Ball" (Meek Mill featuring Young Thug)	2017	96	39	—	—	—	—	Wins & Losses
"White Sand" (Migos featuring Travis Scott, Ty Dolla Sign, and Big Sean)	2018	64	31	58	—	—	—	Culture II
"Lost It" (Rich the Kid featuring Quavo and Offset)	2018	—	—	91	—	—	—	The World Is Yours
"Chanel (Go Get It)" (Young Thug featuring Gunna and Lil Baby)	2018	78	31	92	—	—	—	Slime Language
"Flip the Switch" (Quavo featuring Drake)	2018	48	23	26	76	7	94	Quavo Huncho
"Pay You Back" (Meek Mill featuring 21 Savage)	2018	78	43	—	—	—	—	Championships
"1.5" (21 Savage featuring Offset)	2018	86	33	96	—	—	—	I Am > I Was
"Can't Leave Without It" (21 Savage featuring Gunna and Lil Baby)	2018	58	18	70	—	2	—	I Am > I Was
"F&N" (Future)	2019	83	42	—	—	—	—	The Wizrd
"Wit It" (Gunna)	2019	75	36	—	—	—	—	Drip or Drown 2
"3 Headed Snake" (Gunna featuring Young Thug)	2019	74	35	—	—	40	—	Drip or Drown 2
"Same Yung Nigga" (Gunna featuring Playboi Carti)	2019	97	45	—	—	23	—	Drip or Drown 2
"Fall Threw" (Rich the Kid featuring Young Thug and Gunna)	2019	—	—	—	—	24	—	The World Is Yours 2
"Just How It Is" (Young Thug)	2019	60	23	—	—	18	—	So Much Fun
"Bad Bad Bad" (Young Thug featuring Lil Baby)	2019	32	15	47	—	6	72	So Much Fun
"Hop Off a Jet" (Young Thug featuring Travis Scott)	2019	— (Note: "Hop Off a Jet" did not enter the Billboard Hot 100, but peaked at number one on the Bubbling Under Hot 100 chart.)	41	94	—	3	—	So Much Fun
"Matrix" (NLE Choppa)	2019	—	—	—	—	35	—	Cottonwood
"We Should" (Lil Baby and Young Thug)	2020	91	43	—	—	—	—	My Turn
"Urgency" (Lil Uzi Vert featuring Syd)	2020	76	47	—	—	—	—	Eternal Atake
"Strawberry Peels" (Lil Uzi Vert featuring Young Thug and Gunna)	2020	60	34	—	—	—	—	Lil Uzi Vert vs. the World 2
"Talk About It" (DaBaby)	2020	74	34	—	—	—	—	Blame It on Baby
"Solitares" (Future featuring Travis Scott)	2020	32	15	46	—	5	59	High Off Life
"Harlem Shake" (Future featuring Young Thug)	2020	84	42	—	—	—	—	High Off Life
"Argentina" (Gunna)	2020	67	31	97	—	22	—	Wunna
"Gimmick" (Gunna)	2020	86	41	—	—	—	—	Wunna
"MOTW" (Gunna)	2020	84	39	—	—	—	—	Wunna
"Blindfold" (Gunna featuring Lil Baby)	2020	59	26	86	—	—	—	Wunna
"Met Gala" (Gunna)	2020	70	32	—	—	—	—	Wunna
"Nasty Girl/On Camera" (Gunna)	2020	78	37	—	—	—	—	Wunna
"Top Floor" (Gunna featuring Travis Scott)	2020	55	22	73	—	4	90	Wunna
"Friends & Family" (Nav)	2020	—	—	50	—	—	—	Emergency Tsunami
"Don't Need Friends" (Nav featuring Lil Baby)	2020	65	21	46	—	—	—	Emergency Tsunami
"That's It" (Future and Lil Uzi Vert)	2020	50	14	69	—	—	—	Pluto x Baby Pluto
"Go2DaMoon" (Playboi Carti featuring Kanye West)	2020	82	30	86	—	4	—	Whole Lotta Red
"Solid" (Young Stoner Life, Young Thug and Gunna featuring Drake)	2021	12	6	8	42	1	36	Slime Language 2
"Ski" (Young Stoner Life, Young Thug and Gunna)	2021	18	11	33	—	6	72	Slime Language 2
"Came and Saw" (Young Stoner Life and Young Thug featuring Rowdy Rebel)	2021	66	29	76	—	—	—	Slime Language 2
"Paid the Fine" (Young Stoner Life, Young Thug and Gunna featuring YTB Trench and Lil Baby)	2021	77	32	93	—	—	—	Slime Language 2

== Production credits ==
=== 2013 ===
Jose Guapo – Lingo

- 06. "Honey Bunz" (featuring XVL Ashton)

Shad da God – Gas Life

- 04. "Bizness"
- 06. "No Otha Way"
- 11. "Regardless" (featuring Big Kuntry King)

Shad da God

- 00. "Fuck Dese Niggas" (featuring Young Scooter)

=== 2014 ===
Shad da God

- 00. "No Fold"

Jose Guapo

- 00. "No Noise" (produced with Beatmonster Marc)

Birdman, Young Thug and Rich Homie Quan – Rich Gang: Tha Tour Pt. 1

- 11. "Milk Marie" (Rich Homie Quan)

=== 2015 ===
Beatmonster Marc and Wheezy

- 00. 1500 (featuring Rich Homie Quan, Peewee Longway and Lil Boosie) (produced with Beatmonster Marc)

Young Thug – Barter 6

- 01. "Constantly Hating" (featuring Birdman)
- 05. "Never Had It" (featuring Young Dolph)
- 06. "Dream" (featuring Yak Gotti)
- 07. "Dome" (featuring Duke)
- 09. "Amazing" (featuring Jacquees)
- 10. "Knocked Off" (featuring Birdman) (produced with Ricky Racks)
- 11. "OD"
- 13. "Just Might Be"

Rich Homie Quan – If You Ever Think I Will Stop Goin' In Ask Double R

- 19. "Set It Off"

Shad da God

- 00. Stunt Sometime (featuring TK Kravitz) (produced with Joe McLaren)

Young Thug – Slime Season

- 17. "Wood Would"

Shad da God – 2000 and God

- 01. Hold My Cup (featuring Young Thug) (produced with Joe McLaren)
- 02. Fold
- 03. Stix
- 04. Throwed (featuring Yung Booke)
- 05. Blocked Em In (produced with Joe McLaren)
- 06. Larceny
- 07. Bullshit (featuring Young Dro)
- 08. Who Said (featuring Zach Farlow)
- 09. Money Need Room (produced with Joe McLaren)
- 10. Gold BB's (featuring T.I.)
- 12. Moonrocks
- 14. No No No (featuring T4 Tha Gr8)
- 15. Would You Ride (featuring Rich Homie Quan)

Lil Uzi Vert – Luv Is Rage

- 09. "Queso" (featuring Wiz Khalifa) (produced with TM88)

Young Thug – Slime Season 2

- 05. "She Notice"
- 09. "I'll Tell You What" (produced with Ricky Racks)
- 10. "Mind Right"
- 12. "Pull Up on a Kid" (featuring Yak Gotti)
- 13. "Up"
- 17. "Beast" (produced with Joe McLaren)

Bryyce

- 00. Shade (produced with Judo and The Playmakers)

21 Savage – Slaughter King

- 06. "Mind Yo Business"

Beatmonster Marc and Wheezy

- 00. Khally (featuring Rich Homie Quan) (produced with Beatmonster Marc)

Kid Ink

- 00. "No Pretending"

=== 2016 ===
Young Thug – I'm Up

- 02. "My Boys" (featuring Trouble, Ralo and Lil Durk)
- 03. "For My People" (featuring Duke)
- 04. "King Troup"
- 05. "Ridin" (featuring Lil Durk)

Bankroll Mafia – Bankroll Mafia (album)

- 06. "Neg 4 Degrees" (featuring Young Thug, Lil Duke and Shad da God)
- 08. "My Bros" (featuring Lil Duke, Shad da God and Yung Booke)
- 09. "Up One" (featuring Shad da God, Offset and Quavo)
- 13. "Smoke Tree" (featuring T.I., Shad da God and London Jae)
- 14. "WCW" (featuring T.I., Young Thug, Shad da God and Lil Duke)
- 17. "Bankrolls on Deck" (featuring T.I., Young Thug, Shad da God and PeeWee Roscoe)

21 Savage [Slaughter king mixtape] "Mind yo business"

Lil Duke – Uber

- 02. "Personality"
- 05. "Change Your Life" (featuring Anthony Hamilton)
- 06. "Know Ima Stunt" (featuring Ralo) (produced with Joe McLaren)
- 07. "Never Had Shit" (featuring 21 Savage)
- 08. "Whole Lotta" (featuring Gunna)
- 09. "Know Ima Get It" (featuring Lil Yachty)
- 12. "Cant Have Me" (featuring Dolly)

Domani

- 00. "Poppin" (produced with Joe McLaren)

Shad da God – Free Tha Goat

- 02. "6 Rings"
- 07. "Trap Talk"
- 13. "Torch"
- 14. "Pink Nucca" (featuring Chi Chi)

Shad da God

- 00. "Silk Da Shaka" (produced with Joe McLaren)

Big Kuntry King

- 00. "How We Get Money" (produced with Joe McLaren)

Shad da God

- 00. "420" (produced with Joe McLaren)

Young Dro

- 00. "Drippin Sauce" (produced with Joe McLaren)

Lil Durk – Lil Durk 2X

- 01. "Check"

Lil Duke – Blue Devil

- 03. "Stand Up Niggas" (featuring Young Thug) (produced with TM88)
- 07. "Run It Up" (produced with Cassius Jay)
- 10. "We Get It" (featuring Trae tha Truth)
- 11. "Gotta Be In You" (featuring Gunna)
- 12. "Water Water" (featuring Gunna) (produced with Joe McLaren)

Young Thug – Jeffery

- 02. "Floyd Mayweather" (featuring Travis Scott, Gucci Mane and Gunna) (produced with Jeffery, TM88, Goose and Billboard Hitmakers)
- 03. "Swizz Beatz"
- 06. "Guwop" (featuring Quavo, Offset and Young Scooter) (produced with TM88 and Cassius Jay)
- 09. "Kanye West" (featuring Wyclef Jean) (produced with Cassius Jay)

Various Artists – The Birth of a Nation: The Inspired By Album

- 04. "Oh Lord" (Gucci Mane and Lil Wayne)

Flyguy Tana – Never Had A Deal

- 03. "Ten Toes Down" (featuring MBC)
- 04. "They Don't See Da Score"
- 05. "Is Ya Wit It" (featuring R2R Mike)
- 06. "Spare None" (featuring Shad da God)

Wheezy

- 00. "200,000" (featuring Quavo, Lil Uzi Vert and Shad da God)

=== 2017 ===
Future – Hndrxx

- 12. "I Thank U"

Lil Baby – Perfect Timing

- 06. "100 Round" (featuring Lil Yachty) (produced with TM88)
- 11. "Our Year" (featuring Gunna)

Shad da God – God Gang

- 01. "God Gang"
- 03. "4th of July"
- 04. "Lotta Hox"
- 08. "Originator" (produced with Bobby Raps)
- 10. "Them Boyz" (featuring Young Thug) (produced with B-Rackz)
- 11. "Zip Code"
- 12. "Michael Jackson" (featuring Lil Uzi Vert)

Lil Duke – Life in the Hills

- 01. "Intro"
- 02. "Light My Blunt" (featuring Gunna)
- 05. "Better Days"
- 06. "Billboard" (feat Wiz Khalifa and Dave East)
- 08. "Every Night" (feat Sonyae)
- 09. "Diamonds Dancing" (feat Young Thug) (produced with TM88)
- 10. "Outro"
- 11. "Starve" (featuring Gunna)

Big Bank – King of the Jungle

- 07. 25 Squares (featuring Future)

Gunna – Drip Season 2

- 05. "Japan" (produced with Rex Kudo)
- 08. "Make No Sense" (featuring Lil Duke) (produced with TM88 and Rex Kudo)
- 09. "Money Talking" (featuring Nechie) (produced with B-Rackz)
- 10. "Secure the Vibe" (featuring Young Thug)
- 11. "Ass" (produced with Cap Jesus)
- 14. "Get It If You Want It" (produced with Zaytoven and Cassius Jay)

Young Thug – Beautiful Thugger Girls

- 01. "Family Don't Matter" (featuring Millie Go Lightly) (produced with Rex Kudo)
- 07. "You Said" (featuring Quavo)
- 08. "On Fire" (produced with Charlie Handsome)
- 10. "Feel It"
- 12. "Oh Yeah"

21 Savage – Issa Album

- 12. "Special"
- "Issa" (Unreleased) featuring Young Thug and Drake (musician)

Bobby Raps – Mark

- 13. "Back 2 Life" (produced with Bobby Raps)

Meek Mill – Wins & Losses

- 07. "We Ball" (featuring Young Thug) (produced with Future)

Hustle Gang – We Want Smoke

- 08. "Gateway" (featuring Translee, Yung Booke, Tokyo Jetz and Ink) (produced with Turbo)

Young Thug and Carnage - Young Martha

- 03. "10,000 Slimes" (produced with Carnage)

Gunna - Drip or Drown

- 01. "Paid"
- 02. "Drip or Drown"
- 03. "Invest"
- 04. "Don't Give Up"
- 05. "Award"
- 06. "Don't Play With It" (featuring Young Thug)
- 07. "Dodge the Hate"

Future and Young Thug - Super Slimey

- 04. "200" (produced with Tre Pounds)
- 08. "Drip On Me"

Travis Scott and Quavo - Huncho Jack, Jack Huncho

- 13. "Best Man" (produced with Dun Deal, Mike Dean and C4)

=== 2018 ===
Future, Juice WRLD - Wrld On Drugs

- 02. "Astronauts"
- 03. "Fine China"
- 05. "Make It Back"
- 07. "7AM Freestyle"
- 08. "Different" (featuring Yung Bans)
- 09. "Shorty"
- 10. "Realer N Realer"
- 11. "No Issues"
- 13. "Afterlife"

Young Thug

- 00. "MLK" (featuring Trouble and Shad da God)

Migos - Culture II

- 12. "White Sand" (featuring Travis Scott, Big Sean and Ty Dolla Sign) (produced with Quavo, DJ Durel, Ty Dolla Sign and Travis Scott)

Gunna - Drip Season 3

- 07. "Pedestrian" (produced with Metro Boomin and Doughboy)
- 16. "Toast Up'
- 17. "Drip or Down (Remix)" (featuring Lil Yachty)

Young Sizzle - Trap Ye Season 2

- 16. "OD" (produced with Rex Kudo)

Rich The Kid - The World Is Yours

- 08. "Lost It" (featuring Quavo and Offset) (produced with Metro Boomin and Doughboy)

YoungBoy Never Broke Again - Until Death Call My Name

- 12. "Public Figure" (produced with TM88)

Lil Baby - Harder Than Ever

- 05. "Yes Indeed" (with Drake) (produced with B-Rackz)

Nav - Reckless

- 12. "What I Need / Daheala Outro" (produced with Rex Kudo and DaHeala)

Shad Da God - City Of God

- 12. "Prankster"
- 14. "Thumb Thru" (featuring Gunna and Lil Duke)

Trippie Redd - Life's a Trip

- 06. Bird Shit (produced with We Are The Stars)

Young Thug - Slime Language

- 01. "Tsunami" (produced with Keyyz and Pvlace)
- 06. "Chanel (Go Get It)" (featuring Gunna and Lil Baby) (produced with SinGrinch and Psymun)
- 07. "Dirty Shoes" (featuring Gunna) (produced with Charlie Handsome)
- 08. "It's a Slime" (featuring Lil Uzi Vert)
- 11. "January 1st" (featuring Jacquees and Trapboy Freddy) (produced with DY, Cicero and Bobby Raps)
- 12. "Chains Choking Me" (featuring Gunna) (produced with Bobby Raps and Charlie Handsome)

YoungBoy Never Broke Again - Decided

- 7. "Anormally"

YoungBoy Never Broke Again - 4Respect 4Freedom 4Loyalty 4WhatImportant

- 10. "Nobody Hold Me" (featuring Quando Rondo)

Quavo - Quavo Huncho

- 04. "Flip the Switch" (featuring Drake) (produced with Cubeatz and Keyyz)

Lil Durk - Signed to the Streets 3

- 2. "Don't Talk to Me (featuring Gunna) (produced with Chopsquad DJ)

Tm88 and Southside

- 00. "Hmmm" (featuring Valee and Lil Yachty) (produced with Tm88 and Southside)

Meek Mill - Championships

- 09. "Going Bad" (featuring Drake) (produced with Westen Weiss)
- 14. "Pay You Back" (featuring 21 Savage (produced with Cubeatz)

21 Savage - I Am > I Was

- 06. "1.5" (featuring Offset) (produced with Nils)
- 08. "Can't Leave Without It" (featuring Lil Baby and Gunna) (produced with Cubeatz)

=== 2019 ===
Future - Future Hndrxx Presents: The WIZRD

- 05. "Crushed Up" (produced with Ricky Racks and Matt Cap
- 06. "F&N" (produced with Southside and ATL Jacob)
- 12. "Krazy But True" (produced with Frankie Bash, Corbin and Distance Decay)
- 16. "Goin Dummi"

Gunna - Drip or Drown 2

- 01. "Wit it"
- 04. "Cash war"
- 06. "Yao Ming"
- 07. "Idk Why"
- 09. "Baby Birkin" (Produced with Brackz)
- 11. "3 Headed Snake" (feat. Young Thug) (produced with Turbo and Charlie Handsome)
- 16. "Who You Foolin"

Rich the Kid - The World Is Yours 2

- 04. "Fall Threw" (featuring Young Thug & Gunna) (produced with Nils)

Trippie Redd - !

- 10. "Mac 10" (feat. Lil Duke & Lil Baby)

Yung Bans - Misunderstood

- 02. "SOS" (produced with Chopsquad DJ)
- 12. "Hold Up" (featuring Gunna & Young Thug) (produced with Nils)

Lil Gotit - Crazy But It's True

- 05. "Drip School" (featuring Lil Durk) (produced with Cubeatz)

BAD HOP - Lift Off - EP

• 05 “Dead Coaster” (featuring T-PABLOW, Benjazzy & G-k.i.d)

• 06 “Foreign” (feat. YZEER & Tiji Jojo) (produced with Turbo)

Bon Iver - i, i

- 02. "iMi" (drum programming and writing)
- 03. "We" (drum programming and writing)

Young Thug - So Much Fun

- 01. "Just How It Is" (produced with Nick Mira)
- 04. "Hot" (featuring Gunna)
- 07. "Bad Bad Bad" (featuring Lil Baby) (produced with Nils)
- 10. "I Bought Her" (featuring Lil Duke) (produced with DJ Durel)
- 16. "Circle of Bosses" (featuring Quavo) (produced with Nils)

YoungBoy Never Broke Again - AI YoungBoy 2

- 13. Rebel's Kick It

Trippie Redd - A Letter To You 4

- 19. "Chosen"

A Boogie wit da Hoodie - Artist 2.0

- 18. "Mood Swings"

=== 2020 ===
Lil Baby - My Turn

- 14. "We Should" (featuring Young Thug)

Lil Uzi Vert - Eternal Atake

- 13. "Urgency" (featuring Syd)

Lil Uzi Vert - Eternal Atake (Deluxe) - LUV vs. the World 2

- 6. "Strawberry Peels" (featuring Young Thug & Gunna)

DaBaby - Blame It On Baby

- 4. "Talk About It"

Nav - Good Intentions

- 6. "No Debate" (featuring Young Thug)

Future - High Off Life

- 4. "Solitaires" (featuring Travis Scott) (produced with Mike Dean)
- 10. "Harlem Shake" (featuring Young Thug)

Gunna - Wunna

- 1. "Argentina"
- 2. "Gimmick"
- 9. "Blindfold (featuring Lil Baby)
- 10. "Rockstar Bikers & Chains"
- 11. "Met Gala"
- 12. "Nasty Girl/On Camera"
- 14. "I'm on Some"
- 15. "Top Floor" (featuring Travis Scott)
- 17. "Do Better"
- 23. "Relentless" (featuring Lil Uzi Vert)

Iann Dior - I'm Gone

- 9. "Prospect" (featuring Lil Baby) (produced with KBeaZy)

Lil Keed - Trapped on Cleveland 3

- 12. "Hibachi" (featuring Young Thug)
- 17. "Zaza" (featuring Future) (produced with Mosaic)
- 30. "Go Brazy" (featuring Yak Gotti)

YoungBoy Never Broke Again - Top

- 8. "I'm Up" (produced with Selvziño)

Nav - Emergency Tsunami

- 1. "Breaking News Intro"
- 2. "Friends & Family"
- 4. "Nasty
- 5. "Repercussions" (with Young Thug)
- 6. "Vetement Socks"
- 7. "Don't Need Friends" (featuring Lil Baby)
- 8. "Make It Right Back"
- 9. "Trains" (with Lil Keed)
- 10. "Do Ya Deed" (featuring SahBabii)
- 11. "Droppin Tears"
- 12. "Modest"
- 13. "Turn & Twist"
- 14. "Breaking News Outro"
- 15. "Pickney"
- 16. "Stella McCartney" (featuring Future)

Playboi Carti - Whole Lotta Red

- 2. "Go2DaMoon" (featuring Kanye West)

=== 2021 ===
Kanye West - Donda

- 7. "Jonah"
- 20. "Lord I Need You"

Lil Baby & Lil Durk - The Voice of the Heroes

- 4. "Who I Want"
- 14. "Up The Side"

Young Thug - Punk

- 9. "Yea Yea Yea"
- 12. "Bubbly" (featuring Drake & Travis Scott)
- 14. "Faces"
- 17. "Icy Hot" (featuring Doja Cat)

=== 2022 ===
Gunna - DS4Ever

- 1. "Private Island"
- 2. "Pushin P" (featuring Future & Young Thug)
- 3. "Poochie Gown"
- 4. "Mop"
- 13. "Too Easy" (featuring Future)
- 20. "Too Easy Remix" (bonus track) (featuring Future & Roddy Ricch)

Future - I Never Liked You

- 1. "712PM"
- 10. "Chickens" (featuring EST Gee)
- 21. "Worst Day"

Lil Durk - 7220

- 25. "Smurk Outta Here"
- 28. "Expedite This Letter”

Kanye West - Donda 2

- 10. "Happy" (featuring Future)
  (Produced with Kanye West and Digital Nas)

NAV - Demons Protected by Angels

- 6. "One Time" (featuring Don Toliver & Future)
- 17. "Mismatch" (featuring Babyface Ray)

YoungBoy Never Broke Again - 3800 Degrees

- 11. "More Wheezy"

=== 2023 ===
Lil Durk - Almost Healed

- 13. "300 Urus" (Produced with Juke Wong)
- 17. "Cross the Globe" (featuring Juice Wrld)
  (Produced with Charlie Handsome)

Young Thug - Business Is Business

- 4. "Cars Bring Me Out" (featuring Future)
  (Produced with Dez Wright)
- 5. "Wit Da Racks" (featuring 21 Savage, Travis Scott and Yak Gotti)
  (Produced with Dez Wright)
- 15. "Global Access" (featuring Nate Ruess)
  (Produced with Bobby Raps, Metro Boomin, Peter Lee Johnson and Bak)
- 17. "Sake Of My Kids"

Lil Wayne - Tha Fix B4 Tha VI

- 8. "No New Bitches" (Produced with Bobby Raps)

=== 2024 ===
¥$ (Kanye West and Ty Dolla Sign) - Vultures 1

- 11. "Vultures" (featuring Bump J and Lil Durk)
  (Produced with Ye, Ty Dolla Sign, Ambezza, Gustave Rudman, Jae Deal, Jasper Harris, Marlonwiththeglasses, Ojivolta and Prodbyjuice)

=== 2026 ===
Future – The Real Me

- 01. "Fukk a Interview"
- 03. "No Misery"
- 07. "Konnichiwa"
- 09. "Snow in Skyami"
- 11. "Radio"
- 14. "Off the Hinge"
- 16. "Big Moment"
- 18. "Kick"
- 19. "Hollywood"
