= Friends & Family (song) =

2020 song by Nav

Song by Nav

from the album Emergency Tsunami
- Released: November 6, 2020
- Recorded: 2020
- Genre: Trap
- Length: 2:26
- Label: XO; Republic
- Songwriters: Navraj Goraya; Wesley Glass; Amir Esmailian; Jasper Harris
- Producers: Wheezy; Harris

Music video
- "Friends & Family" on YouTube

"Friends & Family" is a song by Canadian rapper Nav. The song serves as the second track off of his commercial mixtape, Emergency Tsunami, which was released through XO Records and Republic Records on November 6, 2020. He wrote the song alongside manager Cash and its producers, Wheezy and Jasper Harris. Wheezy helped in producing every song on the mixtape.

== Background ==
Nav boasts about his copious and decadent lifestyle and fame on the song. He proudly brags about how his rise has come up from being poor to having a career in rap and becoming rich. Furthermore, he goes on to say that he is still making lots of money, despite the lockdowns of the COVID-19 pandemic preventing people from leaving their residences at the time of the song's release. The rapper also reminisces about the time earlier in the year that he got new Nike SB shoes that American rapper and singer Travis Scott gave him at the music video shoot for his collaboration with Nav and Gunna on the latter two's 2020 single "Turks".

== Promotion ==
On November 3, 2020, which was Nav's 31st birthday, he previewed a snippet of the official music video of the song.

== Critical reception ==
Writing for What You Expect?, Brandon Verrastro opined that it "gives the Brown Boy unlimited reasons to tell all of the doubters why they should be jealous of him" and "he was once 'broke as a joke' and now he is spending a twenty clip minimum on designer brands that he already owns". Joshua Edmunds of The Daily Targum said that it "contains some of the best production on the project" and that "Wheezy masterfully combines high octane flutes and fresh sound effects to develop momentum within the track. He also stated, "But Nav bragging about clothes and money throughout the song seemed slightly off-kilter, as many musicians have been struggling throughout the [COVID-19] pandemic due to their inability to go on tour. Nonetheless, the track is a highlight on the album and exhibits Wheezy's skill at production and sound selection."

== Music video ==
The official music video for "Friends & Family" premiered on the same day of its release, but only fourteen hours later, on November 6, 2020. Nav is seen smoking and dancing with Wheezy in the same place where the former shot the visuals for his collaboration with Travis Scott on the latter's 2016 track "Beibs in the Trap". It was directed by Cash, who has mostly always directed Nav's music videos.

== Personnel ==
Credits adapted from Tidal.

- Nav — vocals, songwriting
- Wheezy — production (keyboards included), programming, songwriting
- Cash — songwriting
- Pro Logic — production, songwriting, mixing, studio personnel
- Mike Dean — mastering, studio personnel
- Rodrigo Barahona — engineering, studio personnel
- Kenneth Jarvis III — A&R
- Wendy Goldstein — A&R

== Charts ==
Chart performance for "Friends & Family"
Chart (2020)	Peak position
Canada Hot 100 (Billboard)	50

== Certifications ==
Region	Certification	Certified units/sales
Canada (Music Canada)	Gold	40,000^{‡}
^{‡} Sales+streaming figures based on certification alone.
