= Only the Generals, Pt. II =

Mixtape by Kevin Gates
- Released: February 19, 2021
- Recorded: 2021
- Genre: Hip-hop; trap
- Length: 41:21
- Label: Bread Winners' Association; Atlantic
- Producer: 3 Amigos; Avery on the Beat; Bak; Bizness Boi; Bricks Da Mane; Danny Majic; Danny Wolf; Derelle Rideout; DJ Frank E; DMacTooBangin; Dvtchie; Frankie Bash; John Luther; June The Genius; KC Supreme; Make The Noises; Musik MajorX; Olivier Bassil; Outtatown; Pancho; Pearl Lion; Qss Beatz; Rio Leyva; Section 8; Starboy; Tariq Beats; Taz Taylor; Zay

Kevin Gates chronology
I'm Him (2019)	Only the Generals, Pt. II (2021)	Khaza (2022)

Singles from Only the Generals, Pt. II
- 1. "Plug Daughter 2" Released: February 12, 2021

Only the Generals, Pt. II is the seventeenth mixtape by American rapper Kevin Gates. It was released on February 19, 2021, via Bread Winners Association and Atlantic Records Group, as a surprise mixtape. This project serves as a sequel to his 2019 EP Only the Generals Gon Understand.

== Promotion ==
=== Singles ===
"Plug Daughter 2" was released as the mixtape's only single on February 12, 2021, as well as an accompanying music video. The song was produced by Rio Leyva, the Internet Money producer Taz Taylor, and Zay. The song did not enter the Billboard Hot 100, but peaked at number three on the Bubbling Under Hot 100 chart. And the song also peaked at number 39 on the Hot R&B/Hip-Hop Songs chart.

=== Music videos ===
The music video for the song "Puerto Rico Luv", was released on February 19, 2021, after the mixtape was released.

== Commercial performance ==
On March 6, 2021, On the Generals, Pt. II debuted at number 18 on the US Billboard 200, earning 22,000 album-equivalent units, which included 2,000 copies sold in its first week. The project also debuted at number 11 on the US Top R&B/Hip-Hop Albums charts. And the project debuted at number nine on the US Top Rap Albums charts, becoming Kevin Gates' tenth top-10 debut on the chart overall.

== Track listing ==
Credits adapted from Genius, Spotify, and Tidal.

No.	Title	Writer(s)	Producer(s)	Length
1.	"Yes Lawd"	Marcellus Gates; Francisco Montoya Jr.	Pancho	4:45
2.	"Big Hittah"	Gates; Anton Mendo; Tobias Dekker	Outtatown; Starboy	3:01
3.	"Cartel Swag"	Gates; Kim Candilora; Justin Franks; Daniel Majic; Andrew Cedar	KC Supreme; DJ Frank E; Danny Majic; 3 Amigos	4:19
4.	"Big Steppa"	Gates; Dyllan McKinney	DMacTooBangin	1:58
5.	"Shit"	Gates; Charles Driggers; Avery Cockerill	Bricks Da Mane; Avery on the Beat	3:43
6.	"Raw U Out"	Gates; Miguel Courtidor; Luis Marte	Danny Wolf; Dvtchie; Qss Beatz	3:46
7.	"Send That Load"	Gates; Rai'Shaun Williams; Colin Franken; Alexander Bak	Section 8; Frankie Bash; Bak	2:41
8.	"Plug Daughter 2"	Gates; Rio Leyva; Danny Snodgrass Jr.; Isaiah Valmont	Leyva; Taz Taylor; Zay	3:47
9.	"Wishing In Morocco"	Gates; June James; John Luther	June The Genius; Luther^{[a]}	3:05
10.	"Puerto Rico Luv"	Gates; Morgan Kornmo; Olivier Bassil	Make The Noises; Bassil	3:24
11.	"Waddup Homie Pt. 2"	Gates; Andre Robertson; Derelle Rideout	Bizness Boi; Rideout	3:03
12.	"Fairytale"	Gates; Quinton Cook; Timothy Wells; Jared Scharff; Atariq Crapps	Musik MajorX; Pearl Lion; Tariq Beats	3:49
Total length:				41:21

Notes

- ^{^[a]} signifies a co-producer

== Charts ==
Chart performance for Only the Generals, Pt. II
Chart (2022)	Peak position
US Top Rap Albums (Billboard)	9
US Top R&B/Hip-Hop Albums (Billboard)	11
US Billboard 200	18
