= Brown Boy 2 =

Studio album (reissue) (Note: Released as part of the deluxe reissue of Nav's third studio album, Good Intentions (2020).) by Nav
- Released: May 11, 2020
- Recorded: 2016–2020
- Length: 37:40
- Labels: XO; Republic
- Producers: Nav; 1K; Audio Jacc; Austin Powerz; Jeffrey Rashad; JetsonMade; J Inc; Jordan Fox; Mike Bliss; Money Musik; Nagra; Nick Mira; Nik Dean; Nils; Pro Logic; Rex Kudo; Sidepce; Tay Keith; Wallis Lane; Wheezy

Nav chronology
Good Intentions (2020)	Brown Boy 2 (2020)	Emergency Tsunami (2020)

Brown Boy 2, also known as Good Intentions (Brown Boy 2 Deluxe Version), is a reissued studio album by Canadian rapper Nav. It was released on May 11, 2020, as the deluxe edition of his third studio album, Good Intentions, which was released three days prior, on May 8, 2020. The album also serves as the sequel to Nav's unofficial 2019 extended play, Brown Boy, that his manager Cash released on Audiomack to help Nav come out of retirement at the time. It features additional guest appearances from Quavo and Lil Duke. The original album features guest appearances from Young Thug, Future, Gunna, Travis Scott, Lil Uzi Vert, the late Pop Smoke, Don Toliver, and Lil Durk.

The deluxe edition contributed to Good Intentions debuting at number one on the Billboard 200. The relatively short span of time between the release dates of the re-issue and the standard edition of Good Intentions was a subject of controversy, with journalists viewing the back-to-back releases as being a form of chart manipulation.

== Background ==
On March 14, 2019, Nav released the EP Brown Boy on SoundCloud. The project's tracks later went on to be included on the deluxe edition of Nav's second studio album Bad Habits. Shortly after the release of Good Intentions, Nav announced a deluxe edition release of the album titled Brown Boy 2, which he described as containing "some snippets, some leaks and some new vibes" on social media. The release of the re-issue occurred on May 11, 2020, a few days after the release of the standard edition of Good Intentions. The title comes from Nav's nickname, the Brown Boy, an ode to his Indian descent as both his parents were born in the state of Punjab in India; he has released a song of the same name as the nickname to SoundCloud sometime in 2014, and then a different song of the same name, as part of Good Intentions.

== Track listing ==
Brown Boy 2 track listing
No.	Title	Writer(s)	Producer(s)	Length
1.	"I'm Up"	Navraj Goraya; Brytavious Chambers; Tahj Morgan; Nils Nöehden	JetsonMade; Tay Keith; Nils	2:47
2.	"Relax"	Goraya; Andrew Franklin; Jugraj Nagra; Dorian McKnight	Pro Logic; Nagra; Sidepce	2:18
3.	"Chirp" (featuring Quavo)	Goraya; Quavious Marshall; Franklin; Mohkom Bhangal	Pro Logic; Money Musik	2:50
4.	"Frequently"	Goraya; Franklin; Bhangal	Pro Logic; Money Musik	2:52
5.	"Sprite Clean"	Goraya; Bhangal; Herman Atwal	Money Musik	2:35
6.	"Free Santana" (featuring Lil Duke)	Goraya; Arnold Martinez; Franklin; Bhangal	Pro Logic; Money Musik	2:55
7.	"Heat"	Goraya	Nav	2:19
8.	"No Time"	Goraya; Franklin; Jack Cohen-Mungan; Jack Cornelius	Pro Logic; AudioJacc	2:59
9.	"Yessir"	Goraya; Malik Johnson; Michael Kafandaris	1K; Mike Bliss	2:41
10.	"Pine Soul"	Goraya; Franklin; Jordan Fox	Pro Logic; Fox	2:29
11.	"Two Face"	Goraya; Franklin; Dejan Nikolic	Pro Logic; Nik Dean	3:13
12.	"Extra"	Goraya	Money Musik	2:04
13.	"Ain't Goin Back"	Goraya; Franklin; Nima Jahanbin; Paimon Jahanbin; Austin Schindler; Jeffrey Rashad	Pro Logic; Wallis Lane; Austin Powerz; Rashad	2:58
14.	"Bag"	Goraya; Wheezy; Masamune Kudo; Corbin Smidzik	Wheezy; Rex Kudo	2:40
Total length:				81:45

Good Intentions track listing
No.	Title	Writer(s)	Producer(s)	Length
1.	"Good Intentions (Intro)"	Goraya; Franklin; N. Jahanbin; P. Jahanbin	Nav; Pro Logic; Wallis Lane; Jack LoMastro^{[b]}	2:35
2.	"No Debate" (featuring Young Thug)	Goraya; Jeffery Williams; Amir Esmailian; Glass; Franklin; Bhangal	Nav; Cash; Wheezy; Pro Logic; Money Musik	2:08
3.	"My Business" (featuring Future)	Goraya; Nayvadius Wilburn; Esmailian; Franklin	Cash; Pro Logic; Neal & Alex	3:19
4.	"Turks" (with Gunna featuring Travis Scott)	Goraya; Sergio Kitchens; Jacques Webster II; Esmailian; Glass	Wheezy	2:41
5.	"Brown Boy"	Goraya; Franklin; Simon Schranz; Livingston Allen	Pro Logic; Blwyrmnd	2:14
6.	"Status" (featuring Lil Uzi Vert)	Goraya; Symere Woods; Esmailian; Keanu Torres	Nav; Cash; Pro Logic; Keanu Beats	2:54
7.	"Codeine" (featuring Gunna)	Goraya; Kitchens; Esmailian; Franklin	Nav; Pro Logic	3:08
8.	"Saint Laurenttt"	Goraya; Esmailian; Franklin; N. Jahanbin; P. Jahanbin	Cash; Pro Logic; Wallis Lane; Nabeyin^{[a]}	2:50
9.	"Coast to Coast"	Goraya; Franklin; Saif Khan	Pro Logic; Saif	2:33
10.	"Run It Up" (featuring Pop Smoke)	Goraya; Bashar Jackson; Esmailian; Franklin; Bhangal; Windsor Lubin	Cash; Pro Logic; Money Musik	2:59
11.	"Spend It" (featuring Young Thug)	Goraya; Williams; Esmailian; Glass; Brandon Korn	Cash; Wheezy; Pro Logic; Bkorn	2:39
12.	"Recap" (featuring Don Toliver)	Goraya; Caleb Toliver; Ronald LaTour; Dylan Cleary-Krell	Cardo; Dez Wright	2:23
13.	"She Hurtin"	Goraya; Franklin; N. Jahanbin; P. Jahanbin	Pro Logic; Wallis Lane; VoV^{[a]}	3:06
14.	"Overdose"	Goraya; Franklin; Joseph Hodges	Pro Logic; Joe Hodges	2:57
15.	"Did You Wrong"	Goraya; Dijon McFarlane; Shah Rukh Zaman Khan	Mustard; GYLTTRYP^{[a]}	2:29
16.	"My Space"	Goraya; Franklin; Nikolic	Pro Logic; Nik Dean	2:55
17.	"No Ice" (featuring Lil Durk)	Goraya; Durk Banks; Esmailian; Franklin; Cleary-Krell	Cash; Pro Logic; Dez Wright	3:01
18.	"Proud of Me?"	Goraya; Franklin; Tim Friedrich; Christoph Bauss	Pro Logic; Shucati	2:56
Total length:				49:48

Notes

- ^{^[a]} signifies a co-producer
- ^{^[b]} signifies an additional producer
- ^{^[c]} signifies an uncredited co-producer
- "Bag" contains additional vocals by Corbin
