= Push It =

Push It may refer to:

- "Push It" (Salt-n-Pepa song), 1987
- "Push It" (Garbage song), 1998
- "Push It" (Static-X song), 1999
- "Push It" (Rick Ross song), 2006
- "Push It" (Kevin Gates song), 2019
- "Push It", a song by NLE Choppa featuring Young Thug from the mixtape Me vs. Me

== See also ==
- "Pushit" (song), a 1996 song by Tool
- "Push It", a storyline in the science fiction comedy webtoon series Live with Yourself!
