= Banking on Me =

2022 single by Gunna

Single by Gunna
- Released: February 14, 2022
- Length: 3:20
- Label: YSL; 300
- Songwriters: Sergio Kitchens; Leland Wayne; Peter Lee Johnson
- Producers: Metro Boomin; Peter Lee Johnson

Gunna singles chronology
"Too Easy" (2021)	"Banking on Me" (2022)	"Elon Musk" (2022)

"Banking on Me" is a song by American rapper Gunna. It was released as a single through YSL Records and 300 Entertainment on February 14, 2022. Produced by Metro Boomin and mastered by Joe LaPorta, the song was originally included on the deluxe edition of Gunna's third studio album, DS4Ever, but he took the deluxe edition down and released the song as a standalone single on Valentine's Day.

== Background and composition ==
Gunna previewed "Banking on Me" through an Instagram story in late 2021. On January 11, 2022, he released the deluxe edition of his third studio album, DS4Ever, with the song being one of four new tracks, but removed the deluxe edition the same day. Gunna later released it as a single on Valentine's Day. Gunna raps over romantic piano lines with crudely suggestive lyrics, saying he would not want to "get tired" of his girlfriend, who delivers sexual variety.

== Charts ==
=== Weekly charts ===
Weekly chart performance for "Banking on Me"
Chart (2022)	Peak position
Canada Hot 100 (Billboard)	62
Global 200 (Billboard)	109
New Zealand Hot Singles (RMNZ)	19
US Billboard Hot 100	61
US Hot R&B/Hip-Hop Songs (Billboard)	20
US Rhythmic Airplay (Billboard)	34

=== Year-end charts ===
2022 year-end chart performance for "Banking on Me"
Chart (2022)	Position
US Hot R&B/Hip-Hop Songs (Billboard)	52

== Certifications ==
Certifications for "Banking on Me"
Region	Certification	Certified units/sales
New Zealand (RMNZ)	Gold	15,000^{‡}
United States (RIAA)	Gold	500,000^{‡}
^{‡} Sales+streaming figures based on certification alone.
