= Jumpin on a Jet =

2019 song by Future

Single by Future

from the album The Wizrd
- Released: January 9, 2019
- Genre: Trap
- Length: 2:17
- Label: Freebandz; Epic
- Songwriters: Nayvadius Wilburn; Joshua Luellen; Cristian Castro; Brytavious Chambers
- Producer: Southside

Future singles chronology
"Crushed Up" (2019)	"Jumpin on a Jet" (2019)	"First Off" (2019)

Music video
- "Jumpin on a Jet" on YouTube

"Jumpin on a Jet" is a song by American rapper Future, released as the second single from his seventh studio album The Wizrd on January 9, 2019. It was produced by Southside.

== Composition ==
Winston Cook-Wilson called the song an "upbeat trap anthem featuring some unpredictable flows from the rapper and a catchy vocal sample". Future sings about his lifestyle of jewelry, lean and most notably, flying on a private jet.

== Critical reception ==
Tom Breihan of Stereogum compared the song to Future's previous single "Crushed Up", writing, "Where 'Crushed Up' was generic Future, the new 'Jumpin On A Jet' is something closer to peak-capacity Future. It's still an example of the man operating within his comfort zone — Auto-Tuned melodies, moody trap beat, vaguely soul-destroyed conspicuous-consumption lyrics. But it shows us a Future with more energy and urgency than usual, and it's got hooks working for it, too."

== Music video ==
The music video was uploaded on YouTube on January 8, 2019, the day before the single was released. Directed by Colin Tilley, the video shows with Future climbing a ladder into the heavens and hijacking a plane with a crew. They proceed to throw the cargo out and embark on an expedition to another planet. Future is seen rapping on the other planet, and performing along with a group of "lovely female dancers".

== Charts ==
Chart (2019)	Peak position
Canada Hot 100 (Billboard)	84
US Billboard Hot 100	57
US Hot R&B/Hip-Hop Songs (Billboard)	26

== Certifications ==
Region	Certification	Certified units/sales
United States (RIAA)	Gold	500,000^{‡}
^{‡} Sales+streaming figures based on certification alone.
