= Big Gangsta =

2019 single by Kevin Gates

Single by Kevin Gates

from the album Only the Generals Gon Understand
- Released: April 20, 2019
- Length: 4:03
- Label: BWA
- Songwriter: Kevin Gilyard
- Producer: Felix Leone

Kevin Gates singles chronology
"Drip 4 Sale Extravaganza" (2019)	"Big Gangsta" (2019)	"Yukatan" (2019)

"Big Gangsta" is a song by American rapper Kevin Gates, released on April 20, 2019, as the lead single from his second EP Only the Generals Gon Understand (2019). It was produced by Canadian producer Felix Leone. The song was a sleeper hit, peaking at number 81 on the Billboard Hot 100 in April 2021.

== Composition and critical reception ==
Karlton Jahmal of HotNewHipHop describes the track as one which Kevin Gates "displays his penchant for clever bars and booming choruses". The instrumental features a "soft harp sounding synth and a booming bass", and Gates uses a "sing song flow" in the chorus.

== Charts ==
Chart (2021)	Peak position
Canada Hot 100 (Billboard)	98
Global 200 (Billboard)	132
US Billboard Hot 100	81
US Hot R&B/Hip-Hop Songs (Billboard)	31
US Rhythmic Airplay (Billboard)	21

== Certifications ==
Region	Certification	Certified units/sales
United States (RIAA)	Platinum	1,000,000^{‡}
^{‡} Sales+streaming figures based on certification alone.
