= First Off =

2019 single by Future featuring Travis Scott

Single by Future featuring Travis Scott

from the album The Wizrd
- Released: February 12, 2019
- Genre: Hip hop; trap
- Length: 3:48
- Label: Freebandz; Epic
- Songwriters: Navyadius Wilburn; Jacques Webster II; Amir Esmailian; Jacob Canady
- Producer: ATL Jacob

Future singles chronology
"Jumpin on a Jet" (2019)	"First Off" (2019)	"Out the Mud" (2019)

Travis Scott singles chronology
"Mile High" (2019)	"First Off" (2019)	"Wake Up" (2019)

"First Off" is a song by American rapper Future featuring fellow American rapper Travis Scott. It was sent to rhythmic and urban contemporary radio on February 12, 2019, as the third and final single from the former's seventh studio album, The Wizrd. The song was written by the artists alongside XO manager Cash and producer ATL Jacob. The song marks Future and Travis Scott's second collaboration, following "3500" from Travis Scott's 2015 album Rodeo.

== Composition ==
"First Off" features a "heavy-hitting instrumental" with a "drowsy yet infectious performance by Future". The song features lyrics about money, drugs, and the NBA, and includes references to players such as Dwyane Wade, James Harden, and Tracy McGrady.

== Critical reception ==
Malvika Padin of Clash wrote that Travis Scott's strong performance on the track "lifted the [album]" much like Gunna's feature on "Unicorn Purp".

== Charts ==
Chart (2019)	Peak position
Canada Hot 100 (Billboard)	39
Greece International (IFPI)	34
Lithuania (AGATA)	61
New Zealand Hot Singles (RMNZ)	14
Slovakia Singles Digital (ČNS IFPI)	98
Switzerland (Schweizer Hitparade)	89
UK Singles (OCC)	78
US Billboard Hot 100	47
US Hot R&B/Hip-Hop Songs (Billboard)	24
US Rhythmic Airplay (Billboard)	33

== Certifications ==
Region	Certification	Certified units/sales
Canada (Music Canada)	Platinum	80,000^{‡}
United States (RIAA)	Platinum	1,000,000^{‡}
^{‡} Sales+streaming figures based on certification alone.
