= Don't Need Friends =

2020 song by Nav featuring Lil Baby

Song by Nav featuring Lil Baby

from the album Emergency Tsunami
- Released: November 6, 2020
- Length: 3:04
- Label: XO; Republic
- Songwriters: Navraj Goraya; Dominique Jones; Amir Esmailian; Wesley Glass; Andrew Franklin
- Producers: Wheezy; Pro Logic

Music video
- "Don't Need Friends" on YouTube

"Don't Need Friends" is a song by Canadian rapper Nav, released on November 6, 2020 from his second commercial mixtape Emergency Tsunami. Featuring American rapper Lil Baby, it was produced by Wheezy and Pro Logic.

== Composition ==
The song contains uptempo production consisting of percussion and synthesizers. Lyrically, Nav details his extravagant lifestyle and exotic tastes, and how he does not need new friends.

== Critical reception ==
Mitch Findlay of HotNewHipHop gave a favorable review, writing "Though generally more understated, Lil Baby is not about to be outdone by Nav, matching his every flex with one of equal magnificence. At its core, 'Don't Need Friends' is typical modern flex rap, masterfully produced, capably delivered, and ultimately low-stakes."

== Music video ==
The music video was released on November 9, 2020. It starts with Nav rapping in front of a thunderstorm being projected onto a wall over an ocean background, which is featured at various points. The clip also contains scenes of the rappers standing in front of Lamborghini Urus and collaborating in a recording studio. Wheezy appears with them as well, to dance around. The video also alternates between red and blue-tinged scenes for a while and shows Nav's XO Records chain submerged in water.

== Charts ==
Chart performance for "Don't Need Friends"
Chart (2020)	Peak position
Canada Hot 100 (Billboard)	46
Global 200 (Billboard)	105
New Zealand Hot Singles (RMNZ)	33
US Billboard Hot 100	65
US Hot R&B/Hip-Hop Songs (Billboard)	21

== Certifications ==
Region	Certification	Certified units/sales
Canada (Music Canada)	Gold	40,000^{‡}
^{‡} Sales+streaming figures based on certification alone.
