= Emergency Tsunami =

Mixtape by Nav and Wheezy
- Released: November 6, 2020
- Recorded: 2020
- Length: 32:56
- Labels: XO; Republic
- Producers: Bak; Bobby Raps; Frankie Bash; Frost; Jasper Harris; Pro Logic; Sean Momberger; SinGrinch; Turbo; Wheezy

Nav chronology
Brown Boy 2 (2020)	Emergency Tsunami (2020)	Demons Protected by Angels (2022)

Singles from Emergency Tsunami
- 1. "Young Wheezy" Released: January 12, 2021

Emergency Tsunami is the second commercial mixtape by Canadian rapper Nav. It was released through XO and Republic Records on November 6, 2020. The mixtape contains guest appearances from Gunna, Young Thug, Lil Baby, Lil Keed, and SahBabii. It was produced by American record producer Wheezy, with help from other producers. The mixtape was Nav's third project of the year, following his third studio album, Good Intentions, and its deluxe reissue, Brown Boy 2. The bonus version of the mixtape, including two additional songs, was released five days later, on November 11, 2020. It features an additional guest appearance from Future. It was Wheezy's second time producing every song of a project, following Gunna's extended play, Drip or Drown, in 2017. The cover of the mixtape says "emergency tsunami" in red letters in Japanese. The mixtape was supported by one single, "Young Wheezy", with Gunna, which was sent to US rhythmic contemporary radio, on January 12, 2021.

Professional ratings
Review scores
Source	Rating
AllMusic	2.5/5 stars
What You Expect?	7/10

== Commercial performance ==
Emergency Tsunami debuted at number six on the US Billboard 200 chart, earning 42,000 album-equivalent units with 7,000 in pure album sales in its first week. In its second week, the mixtape dropped to number 43 on the chart.

== Track listing ==
Credits adapted from Tidal.

Emergency Tsunami track listing
No.	Title	Writer(s)	Producer(s)	Length
1.	"Breaking News Intro"	Amir Esmailian		0:34
2.	"Friends & Family"	Navraj Goraya; Wesley Glass; Esmailian; Jasper Harris	Wheezy; Harris	2:25
3.	"Young Wheezy" (with Gunna)	Goraya; Sergio Kitchens; Esmailian; Glass	Wheezy	2:31
4.	"Nasty"	Goraya; Esmailian; Glass; Colin Franken; Corey French	Wheezy; Frankie Bash; SinGrinch	2:37
5.	"Repercussions" (with Young Thug)	Goraya; Jeffery Williams; Esmailian; Glass; Sean Momberger	Wheezy; Momberger	2:39
6.	"Vetement Socks"	Goraya; Esmailian; Glass; Chandler Durham; Franken; Alexander Bak	Wheezy; Turbo; Frankie Bash; Bak	2:35
7.	"Don't Need Friends" (featuring Lil Baby)	Goraya; Dominique Jones; Esmailian; Glass; Andrew Franklin	Wheezy; Pro Logic	3:04
8.	"Make It Right Back"	Goraya; Esmailian; Glass; Robert Richardson	Wheezy; Bobby Raps	2:36
9.	"Trains" (with Lil Keed)	Goraya; Raqhid Render; Esmailian; Glass	Wheezy	2:51
10.	"Do Ya Deed" (featuring SahBabii)	Goraya; Saaheem Valdery; Esmailian; Glass; Franken; Bak	Wheezy; Frankie Bash; Bak	2:44
11.	"Droppin Tears"	Goraya; Esmailian; Glass; Sugar-Ray Henry	Wheezy; Frost	2:09
12.	"Modest"	Goraya; Esmailian; Glass; Henry	Wheezy	3:08
13.	"Turn & Twist"	Goraya; Esmailian; Glass; Franken	Wheezy	2:30
14.	"Breaking News Outro"	Esmailian		0:33
Total length:				32:56

Bonus tracks
No.	Title	Writer(s)	Producer(s)	Length
15.	"Pickney"	Goraya; Esmailian; Glass	Wheezy	2:38
16.	"Stella McCartney" (featuring Future)	Goraya; Nayvadius Wilburn; Esmailian; Glass	Wheezy	3:08
Total length:				38:42

Notes

- "Breaking News Intro" and "Breaking News Outro" feature uncredited vocals from David C. Page.
- "Young Wheezy" features additional vocals from Travis Scott.

== Charts ==
=== Weekly charts ===
Weekly chart performance for Emergency Tsunami
Chart (2020)	Peak position
Canadian Albums (Billboard)	5
French Albums (SNEP)	158
US Billboard 200	6
US Top R&B/Hip-Hop Albums (Billboard)	4

=== Year-end charts ===
Year-end chart performance for Emergency Tsunami
Chart (2021)	Position
US Top R&B/Hip-Hop Albums (Billboard)	100
