= P Power =

2022 song by Gunna featuring Drake

Song by Gunna featuring Drake

from the album DS4Ever
- Released: January 13, 2022
- Genre: Dirty rap
- Length: 3:13
- Label: YSL; 300
- Songwriters: Sergio Kitchens; Aubrey Graham; Leland Wayne; Barry Manilow
- Producer: Metro Boomin

"P Power" (stylized as "P power") is a song by American rapper Gunna featuring Canadian rapper Drake. It was planned to appear on Gunna's third studio album DS4Ever (2022), but its release was delayed due to sample clearance issues. The song was later released on January 13, 2022 as an extra addition to the album. It was produced by Metro Boomin.

== Background ==
On January 5, 2022, Gunna revealed the tracklist of his album DS4Ever, which included the song "Pussy Power". However, when the album was released two days later, "Pussy Power" was notably missing from the record. It was finally released on January 13 as "P Power", on an extended version of DS4Ever. In an interview with Complex, Gunna revealed that the delay occurred because of sample clearance issues. He said, "I originally sampled Donna Summer. I don't even know her, because I'm so young. But she was a legend and her estate couldn't get back in time for my album."

== Composition ==
The song contains a sample of Donna Summer's cover of "Could It Be Magic" by Barry Manilow. Lyrically, Gunna and Drake detail their "drug-driven moments" and "escapades" with women, as well as buying them expensive items due to their lifestyles of luxury. The song also features moans from a woman in the background along with the instrumental.

== Charts ==
=== Weekly charts ===
Weekly chart performance for "P Power"
Chart (2022)	Peak position
Canada Hot 100 (Billboard)	22
Global 200 (Billboard)	30
New Zealand Hot Singles (RMNZ)	5
South Africa Streaming (TOSAC)	37
UK Singles (Official Charts)	76
US Billboard Hot 100	24
US Hot R&B/Hip-Hop Songs (Billboard)	7

=== Year-end charts ===
2022 year-end chart performance for "Have Power"
Chart (2022)	Position
US Hot R&B/Hip-Hop Songs (Billboard)	53

== Certifications ==
Certifications for "P Power"
Region	Certification	Certified units/sales
Canada (Music Canada)	3× Platinum	240,000^{‡}
New Zealand (RMNZ)	Platinum	30,000^{‡}
South Africa (RISA)	Gold	20,000^{‡}
United Kingdom (BPI)	Silver	200,000^{‡}
United States (RIAA)	3× Platinum	3,000,000^{‡}
^{‡} Sales+streaming figures based on certification alone.
