= I'm Him =

Studio album by Kevin Gates
- Released: September 27, 2019
- Genre: Hip hop
- Length: 49:00
- Labels: Atlantic; Bread Winners'
- Producers: Aubrey Robinson; BeatByJeff; Blake Slatkin; CashMoneyAP; Derrick Milano; DJ Chose; E-Trou; Exotic Muzik; Flamey; Fractious Frank; Go Grizzly; Invincible Beats; Jon C.; KC Supreme; Melvyn Gonzalez; MDS; Mike Arrow; Nard & B; Nick Mira; Richie Souf; Roark Bailey; Russ Chell; Six7; Take a DayTrip; Taz Taylor; XL Eagle; Yung Lan

Kevin Gates chronology
Only the Generals Gon Understand (2019)	I'm Him (2019)	Only the Generals, Pt. II (2021)

Singles from I'm Him
- 1. "Push It" Released: June 28, 2019; 2. "Facts" Released: July 25, 2019

Professional ratings
Review scores
Source	Rating
AllMusic	4/5 stars
Laut.de	3/5 stars
Pitchfork	7.4/10

I'm Him (His Imperial Majesty) is the second studio album by American rapper Kevin Gates. It was released on September 27, 2019, via Atlantic Records and Bread Winners' Association.

== Background ==
On January 10, 2018, Gates was released from prison. His return to social media saw him posting a picture with the phrase "I'm Him", many fans speculating it to be the title of his upcoming second album. On June 28, 2019, Gates announced the album along with the release of the album's lead single "Push It", with "I'm Him" as the official album title. On September 17, Gates announced the release date on social media. I'm Him served as his second studio album, following his debut album in early 2016. The album follows four months after May 2019's Only the Generals Gon Understand EP.

== Singles ==
The lead single "Push It" was released on June 28, 2019. Its music video was released the same day.

The second single, "Facts", was released on July 25, 2019. The music video was released alongside the song.

== Commercial performance ==
I'm Him debuted at number four on the US Billboard 200 chart, earning 72,000 album-equivalent units (of which 10,000 were pure album sales) in its first week. This became Gates' fourth US top 10 album. On June 10, 2020, the album was certified gold by the Recording Industry Association of America (RIAA) for combined sales and album-equivalent units of over 500,000 units in the United States.

== Track listing ==
Adapted from Apple Music and Tidal.

No.	Title	Writer(s)	Producer(s)	Length
1.	"RBS Intro"	Kevin Gilyard; Alex Petit; Kevin Price	CashMoneyAP; Go Grizzly	2:18
2.	"Icebox"	Gilyard; David Biral; Denzel Baptiste; Russ Chell	Take a Daytrip; Russ Chell	2:39
3.	"By My Lonely"	Gilyard; Vincent Watson	Invincible Beats	2:10
4.	"Bags"	Gilyard; Andrea Principiano	Flamey	2:30
5.	"Facts"	Gilyard; Biral; Baptiste; Blake Slatkin; Derrick Milano	Take a Daytrip; Blake Slatkin	3:01
6.	"Fatal Attraction"	Gilyard; Biral; Baptiste	Take a DayTrip	2:49
7.	"Say It Twice"	Gilyard; Kendall Roark Bailey; Aubrey Robinson; Milano	Roark Bailey; Robinson	2:41
8.	"Walls Talking"	Gilyard; Tony Son; Bailey; Jaucquez Lowe	Richie Souf; Roark Bailey	2:53
9.	"Let It Go"	Gilyard; Watson	Invincible Beats	3:26
10.	"Face Down"	Gilyard; Norman Payne	DJ Chose	2:38
11.	"Push It"	Gilyard; Santeri Kauppinen; Franklin Shadrack; Mike Arrow; John Christopher Murphy; Milano	MDS; Fractious Frank; Mike Arrow	3:00
12.	"Have You Ever"	Gilyard; Nick Mira; Danny Snodgrass, Jr.; Elias Latrou	Nick Mira; Taz Taylor; E-Trou	3:02
13.	"Pretend"	Gilyard; Price; Jonathon Castaneda	Go Grizzly; Jon C.	3:16
14.	"What I Like"	Gilyard; Jefferson Ogendi; Daremey Steptoe; Lowe	BeatByJeff; Six7	2:45
15.	"Funny How"	Gilyard; Milan Modi	Yung Lan	2:57
16.	"Betta for You"	Gilyard; James Bernard Rosser Jr.; Brandon Rackley; Trevon Campbell	Nard & B; XL Eagle; KC Supreme^{[a]}	2:57
17.	"Fly Again"	Gilyard; Modi; Tevin Thompson	Yung Lan; Exotic Muzik^{[b]}	4:06
Total length:				49:00

=== Notes ===
- ^{^[a]} signifies an uncredited co-producer
- ^{^[b]} signifies an additional producer

== Charts ==
=== Weekly charts ===
Chart (2019)	Peak position
Canadian Albums (Billboard)	28
US Billboard 200	4
US Top R&B/Hip-Hop Albums (Billboard)	2
US Top Rap Albums (Billboard)	2

=== Year-end charts ===
Chart (2019)	Position
US Top R&B/Hip-Hop Albums (Billboard)	75
Chart (2020)	Position
US Billboard 200	160
US Top R&B/Hip-Hop Albums (Billboard)	80

== Certifications ==
Region	Certification	Certified units/sales
United States (RIAA)	Gold	500,000^{‡}
^{‡} Sales+streaming figures based on certification alone.
