= Crushed Up =

2019 song by Future

Single by Future

from the album The Wizrd
- Released: January 4, 2019
- Length: 2:29
- Label: Freebandz; Epic
- Songwriters: Ricky Harrell Jr.; Matt Cap; Nayvadius Wilburn; Wesley Glass
- Producers: Matt Cap; Ricky Racks; Wheezy

Future singles chronology
"Fine China" (2018)	"Crushed Up" (2019)	"Jumpin on a Jet" (2019)

Music video
- "Crushed Up" on YouTube

"Crushed Up" is a song by American rapper Future, released on January 4, 2019, as the lead single from his seventh studio album The Wizrd, which was released two weeks later. The song was produced by Wheezy, Matt Cap and Ricky Racks, all three of whom co-wrote the song with Future. The song finds Future singing about his luxurious lifestyle, especially regarding jewelry and diamonds.

== Critical reception ==
The song was met with generally positive reviews. Karlton Jahmal of HotNewHipHop wrote that the song "sounds polished to perfection", adding, "His vocals are mixed immaculately over calming synths. The kicks on the instrumental will cause you to nod your head the moment they drop and the addicting chorus is already stuck in my head."

Billboard magazine ranked it 71st on their list of the 100 Best Songs of 2019, calling it his "mightiest 2019 single".

== Music video ==
The music video was uploaded on YouTube the day before the single was released. It was directed by Spike Jordan and Sebastian Sduigui. The video begins with a boy entering an "alternate universe of winter wonderland". The setting then shifts to that of a mansion, with snow falling from the ceiling. Future walks through the mansion in various outfits, followed by ballerinas and "some creepy crawlers like tarantulas and scorpions".

== Live performances ==
In January 2019, Future performed the song at The Late Show with Stephen Colbert and The Ellen DeGeneres Show.

== Charts ==
Chart (2019)	Peak position
Canada Hot 100 (Billboard)	41
Lithuania (AGATA)	91
New Zealand Hot Singles (RMNZ)	13
UK Singles (OCC)	81
US Billboard Hot 100	43
US Hot R&B/Hip-Hop Songs (Billboard)	18

== Certifications ==
Region	Certification	Certified units/sales
Canada (Music Canada)	Platinum	80,000^{‡}
United States (RIAA)	Platinum	1,000,000^{‡}
^{‡} Sales+streaming figures based on certification alone.

== In popular culture ==
The song is featured in the first episode of Watchmen, "It's Summer and We're Running Out of Ice".
