= DS4Ever =

Studio album by Gunna
- Released: January 7, 2022
- Recorded: 2021
- Genres: Hip-hop; trap
- Length: 58:07
- Labels: YSL; 300
- Producers: Allen Ritter; Alex Lustig; Ambezza; Bak; Baso; Bobby Raps; Brandon McNab; Byrd; Charlie Handsome; Chris Townsend; Dez Wright; DJ Cash; Fano; iWeirdo; Juke Wong; LNK; Metro Boomin; Mike Will Made It; Nik Dean; Rex Kudo; Sean Momberger; Shawn Ferrari; Southside; Taurus; Turbo; Wheezy; Young Twix

Gunna chronology
Slime Language 2 (2021)	DS4Ever (2022)	A Gift & a Curse (2023)

Singles from DS4Ever
- 1. "Too Easy" Released: September 24, 2021

DS4Ever (stylized in all caps and alternatively titled Drip Season 4Ever) is the third studio album by American rapper Gunna. It was released on January 7, 2022, by YSL Records and 300 Entertainment. The album features guest appearances from Future, Young Thug, 21 Savage, Drake, Kodak Black, Chlöe, Lil Baby, G Herbo, Nechie, Chris Brown, Yung Bleu, and Roddy Ricch. It serves as the fourth and final installment of Gunna's Drip Season series, following his third mixtape, Drip Season 3 (2018).

Despite receiving mixed reviews from music critics, DS4Ever performed well commercially, debuting atop the US Billboard 200 with 150,000 album-equivalent units of which 4,000 were pure sales, making for Gunna's second number-one album.

== Release and promotion ==
On January 1, 2022, Gunna revealed the album's release date. The cover art, which was created by American architect Daniel Arsham, was revealed on January 4. It was followed by the tracklist, which was shared the following day.

The album's lead single, "Too Easy", a collaboration with American rapper Future, was released on September 24, 2021. The remix, which includes an additional feature from American rapper Roddy Ricch, was released on December 3, 2021. The music video for the remix was released on January 7, 2022. "Too Easy" peaked at number 16 on the US Billboard Hot 100.

A music video for the song "Livin Wild" was released on January 10, 2022, while the music video for "Pushin P" with Future featuring Young Thug, was released on January 12. The songs peaked at number 61 and seven on the Billboard Hot 100, respectively.

On January 13, 2022, "P Power" (originally titled "Pussy Power"), a collaboration with fellow rapper Drake, was added to the album. The song peaked at number 24 on the Billboard Hot 100.

== Critical reception ==
Professional ratings
Aggregate scores
Source	Rating
Metacritic	51/100
Review scores
Source	Rating
AllMusic	2.5/5 stars
Exclaim!	7/10
HipHopDX	3.6/5
HotNewHipHop	70%
Pitchfork	5.0/10
Rolling Stone	3/5 stars

DS4Ever was met with mixed reviews. At Metacritic, which assigns a normalized rating out of 100 to reviews from professional publications, the album received an average score of 51, based on five reviews.

Michael Di Gennaro from Exclaim! enjoyed the album, saying, "DS4Ever is certainly a good mainstream rap record, and fans of Gunna and the community of high-profile Atlanta artists he's aligned with will find plenty to enjoy across the album's 19 tracks". Armon Sadler of HipHopDX said, "DS4Ever is proof he presumably won't allow stardom to make him complacent, balancing improvements in song topics and technical skill, even if the drip talk has gone stale". In a lukewarm review, Rolling Stone's Mosi Reeves wrote, "Gunna has a flashy and intoxicating vocal style, and that alone [makes] DS4 a worthy escapade. But he can't transcend the clichés that define his era".

Reviewing the album for AllMusic, David Crone stated, "After tunnelling into a very specific avenue for Wunna, DS4 loses focus, instead spreading the rapper thin across a much wider smattering of styles. The resulting project feels noncommittal: DS4 is caught between the woozy, floating sounds of Wunna and an older, heavier-hitting sound, yet nails neither". Pitchfork critic Alphonse Pierre said, "The Atlanta rapper's latest album is monotonous, short on the quirks and out-of-body experiences of his better projects".

== Commercial performance ==
DS4Ever debuted atop the US Billboard 200 with 150,000 album-equivalent units comprising 193.5 million on-demand streams and 4,000 pure sales, making it Gunna's second number-one album. The album notably blocked the Weeknd's album Dawn FM from the top spot by approximately 2,300 units. In September 2025, Young Thug claimed in a leaked jail phone call that he had paid $50,000 for botted streams on DS4Ever without Gunna's knowledge, saying: "You didn't honestly earn a No. 1 album over the Weeknd, my boy. I paid for that sh–. I never said anything to him. I never told him that. ... You never earned a No. 1 album. I spent 50 extra grand buying motherf—ing streams for you."

== Track listing ==
DS4Ever track listing
No.	Title	Writer(s)	Producer(s)	Length
1.	"Private Island"	Sergio Kitchens; Wesley Glass; Masamune Kudo	Wheezy; Rex Kudo	2:12
2.	"Pushin P" (with Future featuring Young Thug)	Kitchens; Nayvadius Wilburn; Jeffery Williams; Glass; Lucas DePante	Wheezy; Juke Wong	2:16
3.	"Poochie Gown"	Kitchens; J. Williams; Leland Wayne; Joshua Luellen; Allen Ritter	Metro Boomin; Southside; Ritter	2:21
4.	"Mop" (featuring Young Thug)	Kitchens; J. Williams; Glass; Dylan Cleary-Krell	Wheezy; Dez Wright	3:05
5.	"Thought I Was Playing" (with 21 Savage)	Kitchens; Shéyaa Abraham-Joseph; Michael Williams II	Mike Will Made It; Shawn Ferrari; iWeirdo	2:47
6.	"P Power" (featuring Drake)	Kitchens; Aubrey Graham; Wayne; Barry Manilow	Metro Boomin	3:13
7.	"How You Did That" (featuring Kodak Black)	Kitchens; Basil von Stietencron; Stefano McNutt	Baso; Turbo; Fano	2:40
8.	"Alotta Cake"	Kitchens; Wayne	Metro Boomin; Chris Townsend	3:13
9.	"Livin Wild"	Kitchens; Chandler Durham; Brandon McNab	Turbo; Hey McNab	2:22
10.	"You & Me" (with Chlöe)	Kitchens; Chloe Bailey; Taurus Currie	Taurus	2:24
11.	"South to West"	Kitchens; Durham; Leutrim Beqiri	Turbo; Byrd	2:02
12.	"25k Jacket" (featuring Lil Baby)	Kitchens; Glass; Dejan Nikolic	Wheezy; Nik Dean	2:00
13.	"Too Easy" (with Future)	Kitchens; Wilburn; Glass; Sean Momberger	Wheezy; Momberger	2:18
14.	"IDK That Bitch" (featuring G Herbo)	Kitchens; Herbert Wright III; Durham; Currie; Alexander Lustig	Turbo; Taurus; Alex Lustig	3:30
15.	"Flooded"	Kitchens; Demba Faye	Young Twix	2:32
16.	"Life of Sin" (featuring Nechie)	Kitchens; Ceron Lee; Glass; Cleary-Krell	Wheezy; Dez Wright	2:52
17.	"Die Alone" (with Chris Brown featuring Yung Bleu)	Kitchens; Christopher Brown; Jeremy Biddle; Mathias Liyew; Leon Krol; DJ Cash	Ambezza; LnK; DJ Cash	4:21
18.	"Missing Me"	Kitchens; Glass; Robert Richardson	Wheezy; Bobby Raps	2:58
19.	"So Far Ahead > Empire"	Kitchens; Durham; Currie; Ryan Vojtesak; Alexander Bak	Turbo; Taurus; Charlie Handsome; Bak	5:37
20.	"Too Easy" (remix featuring Future and Roddy Ricch)	Kitchens; Wilburn; Rodrick Moore, Jr.; Glass; Momberger	Wheezy; Momberger	3:17
Total length:				58:07

Drip Season 4Ever (deluxe edition) additional track listing
No.	Title	Writer(s)	Producer(s)	Length
2.	"All the Money"	Kitchens; Wayne; David Ruoff; Elias Klughammer	Metro Boomin; David x Eli	2:47
5.	"Push Start"	Kitchens; Glass; Kenneth Redfield; McNab	Wheezy; Kenny Stuntin; Hey McNab
8.	"Banking on Me"	Kitchens; Wayne; Peter Lee Johnson	Metro Boomin; Johnson	3:20
15.	"Occupation" (featuring Strick)	Kitchens; Tauren Strickland; Glass; Currie	Wheezy; Taurus	4:07

Notes

- "P Power" was not originally on the tracklisting when the album was initially released due to sample clearance issues. It was added to the album on streaming services on January 13, 2022.
- "Pushin P" is stylized as "pushin P".
- All other tracks are stylized in all lowercase. For example, "Private Island" is stylized as "private island".
- The Drip Season 4Ever deluxe edition tracks were pulled from streaming services a few hours after their release. "All the Money" was later included on Metro Boomin's album Heroes & Villains, while "Banking on Me" was released as a standalone single.

Sample credits

- "P Power" contains samples of "Could It Be Magic", written by Barry Manilow, as performed by Donna Summer.
- "Livin Wild" contains samples of "Why Me Baby?", written by Keith Sweat, Teddy Riley, and James Todd Smith, as performed by Keith Sweat featuring LL Cool J.
- "You & Me" contains samples of "They Don't Know", written by Tim Kelley, Bob Robinson, and Jonathan Buck, as performed by Jon B.; and samples from "Nice & Slow", written by Jermaine Dupri, Manuel Seal, Jr., Usher Raymond IV, and Brian Casey, as performed by Usher.

== Personnel ==
- Joe LaPorta – mastering
- Ethan Stevens – mixing (1–3, 5–11, 13–18)
- Bainz – mixing (2, 4), recording (4), engineering assistance (16)
- Patrizio Pigliapoco – mixing (12), engineering (16)
- MixedbyAli – mixing (19)
- Aresh Banaji – mix engineering (4)
- Flo Ongonga – engineering
- Eric Manco – engineering (2, 12, 19)
- Taylor Moser – engineering (6)
- Joba Aladeselu – engineering (9)
- Mattazik Muzik – engineering (11)
- AJStayWorking – engineering (15)
- Nathaniel Alford – engineering (16)
- Chris Dennis – engineering (19)
- Braden Davies – mixing assistance (1, 3, 5–11, 13–18)
- Zack Acousta – mixing assistance (1, 3, 5–11, 13–18)
- Ashley Jackson – mixing assistance (12)
- Rosa Westfall – engineering assistance (1)
- Ernesto Carbo – engineering assistance (2)
- Rebekka Zeyfiyan – engineering assistance (2)
- Abel Wagner – engineering assistance (3, 5)
- Jim Bailey – engineering assistance (4, 18)
- Nick Poire – engineering assistance (4)
- Cameron Peterson – engineering assistance (5)
- Tanner Schmeidl – engineering assistance (6)
- Clive Coateston – engineering assistance (7)
- Jarred Barnville – engineering assistance (8)
- Raymund Sanchez Jr – engineering assistance (8)
- Paul Cho – engineering assistance (9)
- Seongho Kwak – engineering assistance (9)
- Teddrick Palmer – engineering assistance (10)
- Angie Randisi – engineering assistance (11)
- Emily Diaz – engineering assistance (12)
- Rodrigo Barahona – engineering assistance (12, 19)
- Ejaaz Collins – engineering assistance (13)
- Samuel Reyes – engineering assistance (13)
- Anand Joshi – engineering assistance (14)
- Anthony Williams – engineering assistance (15)
- ChanelGoinStupid – engineering assistance (17)
- Shaan Singh – engineering assistance (18)

== Charts ==
=== Weekly charts ===
Weekly chart performance for DS4Ever
Chart (2022)	Peak position
Australian Albums (ARIA)	12
Austrian Albums (Ö3 Austria)	5
Belgian Albums (Ultratop Flanders)	9
Belgian Albums (Ultratop Wallonia)	21
Canadian Albums (Billboard)	2
Danish Albums (Hitlisten)	10
Dutch Albums (Album Top 100)	5
Finnish Albums (Suomen virallinen lista)	17
French Albums (SNEP)	22
German Albums (Offizielle Top 100)	14
Irish Albums (Official Charts)	6
Italian Albums (FIMI)	46
Lithuanian Albums (AGATA)	9
New Zealand Albums (RMNZ)	11
Norwegian Albums (VG-lista)	4
Swedish Albums (Sverigetopplistan)	32
Swiss Albums (Schweizer Hitparade)	4
UK Albums (Official Charts)	4
UK R&B Albums (Official Charts)	32
US Billboard 200	1
US Top R&B/Hip-Hop Albums (Billboard)	1

=== Year-end charts ===
2022 year-end chart performance for DS4Ever
Chart (2022)	Position
Canadian Albums (Billboard)	50
US Billboard 200	14

2023 year-end chart performance for DS4Ever
Chart (2023)	Position
US Billboard 200	129

== Certifications ==
Certifications for DS4Ever
Region	Certification	Certified units/sales
Canada (Music Canada)	Platinum	80,000^{‡}
New Zealand (RMNZ)	Gold	7,500^{‡}
United Kingdom (BPI)	Silver	60,000^{‡}
United States (RIAA)	Platinum	1,000,000^{‡}
^{‡} Sales+streaming figures based on certification alone.
