= Only the Generals Gon Understand =

EP by Kevin Gates
- Released: May 31, 2019
- Genre: Trap; hip hop
- Length: 18:28
- Label: Bread Winners Association; Atlantic
- Producer: Yung Lan; BlazeOnDaBeatz; D. A. Doman

Kevin Gates chronology
Luca Brasi 3 (2018)	Only the Generals Gon Understand (2019)	I'm Him (2019)

Singles from Only the Generals Gon Understand
- 1. "Big Gangsta" Released: April 20, 2019; 2. "Yukatan" Released: May 6, 2019

Only the Generals Gon Understand is the second EP by American hip hop recording artist Kevin Gates.

== Chart performance ==
Only the Generals Gon Understand debuted at number eighteen on the Billboard 200. It also debuted at number ten and number nine on the Billboard R&B/Hip Hop Albums and the Billboars Top Rap Albums charts, respectively.

== Track listing ==
No.	Title	Length
1.	"Big Gangsta"	4:03
2.	"Yukatan"	3:02
3.	"Luv Bug"	3:05
4.	"Rich Off"	1:32
5.	"World Luv"	3:28
6.	"Case Closed"	3:19
Total length:		18:28

== Charts ==
Chart (2019)	Peak position
US Billboard 200	18
US Top R&B/Hip-Hop Albums (Billboard)	10
