= Too Easy =

2021 single by Gunna and Future

Single by Gunna and Future

from the album DS4Ever
- Released: September 24, 2021
- Length: 2:18
- Label: YSL; 300
- Songwriters: Sergio Kitchens; Nayvadius Wilburn; Wesley Glass; Sean Momberger
- Producers: Wheezy; Momberger

Gunna singles chronology
"Paper Cuts" (2021)	"Too Easy" (2021)	"Banking on Me" (2022)

Future singles chronology
"Way 2 Sexy" (2021)	"Too Easy" (2021)	"Me or Sum" (2021)

"Too Easy" is a song by American rappers Gunna and Future. It was released through YSL Records and 300 Entertainment on September 24, 2021, as the lead single from Gunna's third studio album, DS4Ever (2022). The song was produced by Wheezy and Sean Momberger.

== Composition ==
Jon Blistein of Rolling Stone described the track's production as a "prickly harp loop around crisp drums, big bass hits and a sinister synth". Gunna and Future sing about how they could easily make a hit whenever they collaborate, as well as the "riches and success they've attained in their respective careers".

== Remix ==
The official remix of the song features American rapper Roddy Ricch and was released on December 3, 2021. The remix later appeared on the album alongside the original as a bonus track.

== Charts ==
=== Weekly charts ===
Weekly chart performance for "Too Easy"
Chart (2021–2022)	Peak position
Canada Hot 100 (Billboard)	43
Global 200 (Billboard)	32
New Zealand Hot Singles (RMNZ)	12
Portugal (AFP)	190
South Africa Streaming (TOSAC)	19
Switzerland (Schweizer Hitparade)	74
UK Singles (OCC)	43
UK Indie (OCC)	20
UK Hip Hop/R&B (OCC)	16
US Billboard Hot 100	16
US Hot R&B/Hip-Hop Songs (Billboard)	6
US Rhythmic Airplay (Billboard)	30
US Rolling Stone Top 100	11

=== Year-end charts ===
2022 year-end chart performance for "Too Easy"
Chart (2022)	Position
US Hot R&B/Hip-Hop Songs (Billboard)	62

== Certifications ==
Certifications for "Too Easy"
Region	Certification	Certified units/sales
United States (RIAA)	Platinum	1,000,000^{‡}
^{‡} Sales+streaming figures based on certification alone.
