= Young Wheezy =

Single by Nav and Gunna

Single by Nav and Gunna

from the album Emergency Tsunami
- Released: January 12, 2021
- Recorded: 2020
- Length: 2:31
- Label: XO; Republic
- Songwriters: Navraj Goraya; Sergio Kitchens; Wesley Glass; Amir Esmailian
- Producer: Wheezy

Nav singles chronology
"Lemonade (Latin Remix)" (2020)	"Young Wheezy" (2021)	"Jesse Owens" (2021)

Gunna singles chronology
"All The Smoke" (2020)	"Young Wheezy" (2021)	"Get It" (2021)

Music video
- "Young Wheezy" on YouTube

"Young Wheezy" is a song by Canadian rapper Nav and American rapper Gunna, from the former's mixtape Emergency Tsunami (2020). Its music video was released on January 7, 2021, and the song was sent to U.S. rhythmic contemporary radio five days later. Produced by Wheezy, the song's namesake, the song is about the rappers' lifestyles.

== Music video ==
The music video, directed by Spike Jordan, has a Halloween theme and plays on the lyrics "Cost an arm and a leg just to see me perform". The video begins with a long line of people waiting at a venue, where Nav and Gunna and Travis Scott are hosting a party, with dismembered limbs as their required tickets to enter. A group of teens talk about how they obtained the limbs, indicating how eager they were to go. Inside the house, Nav and Gunna are seen performing, while "spooky visual effects" are also taking place. A "hefty collection" of the severed limbs are shown at one point. Travis Scott, who also has additional vocals on the song, is seen with the collaborators as they surround an open grave. Wheezy also appears in the video; he later dissolves into water in the middle of a laundromat.

== Live performances ==
Nav and Gunna performed the song on Jimmy Kimmel Live! in February 2021.

== Charts ==
Chart (2020)	Peak position
Canada Hot 100 (Billboard)	51
Global 200 (Billboard)	133
US Billboard Hot 100	84
US Hot R&B/Hip-Hop Songs (Billboard)	34
US Rhythmic Airplay (Billboard)	32
