= The Wizrd =

Studio album by Future
- Released: January 18, 2019
- Studios: 5 Star (Atlanta); 11th Street (Atlanta); Chalice (Los Angeles)
- Genre: Hip-hop
- Length: 61:48
- Labels: Freebandz; Epic
- Producers: ATL Jacob; Billboard Hitmakers; Cubeatz; DY; Fuse; Jambo; Matt Cap; Nineteen85; Richie Souf; Ricky Racks; Southside; Tay Keith; TM88; Van Riper; Westen Weiss; Wheezy

Future chronology
Wrld on Drugs (2018)	The Wizrd (2019)	Save Me (2019)

Singles from The Wizrd
- 1. "Crushed Up" Released: January 4, 2019; 2. "Jumpin on a Jet" Released: January 9, 2019; 3. "First Off" Released: February 12, 2019

Future Hndrxx Presents: The Wizrd (also referred to simply as The Wizrd and stylized as The WIZRD) is the seventh studio album by the American rapper Future, released on January 18, 2019, by Freebandz and Epic Records. It was announced on January 4 with the release of the single "Crushed Up". The album was additionally promoted by a film titled The Wizrd, released on January 11 on Apple Music. The second single, "Jumpin on a Jet", was released on January 9. The album has 20 songs and includes guest appearances by Young Thug, Gunna, and Travis Scott.

The Wizrd received generally positive reviews from critics and debuted at number one on the US Billboard 200. It is Future's sixth US number-one album.

== Release and promotion ==
The album was accompanied by a film of the same name, released on Apple Music on January 11. Its announcement was accompanied by the release of the trailer. Produced by Mass Appeal, the hour-long film follows Future on the 2016 Purple Reign tour and offers a look into his personal life and creative process. Various celebrities including Drake, Young Thug and DJ Khaled make appearances in the film. Screenings of the film were held in several US cities.

In the days leading up to the album's release, Future posted snippets of selected tracks through videos on social media. Each visual featured some of the most well-known wizards in popular culture, including Lord Voldemort from Harry Potter and the Wizard of Oz from the Wizard of Oz. In an interview with Genius, Future revealed that the album and its title is dedicated to a late uncle of his who gave him the nickname, "Wizard".

=== Singles ===
The first single, "Crushed Up", was released on January 4, 2019, with its music video, directed by Spike Jordan and Sebastian Sdaigui, also being released the same day. "Jumpin on a Jet", produced by Southside, was released on January 9 along with a music video showing a heist on an airplane. "First Off" featuring American rapper Travis Scott, was sent to rhythmic and urban contemporary radio on February 12, 2019, as the album's third official single.

== Critical reception ==
Professional ratings
Aggregate scores
Source	Rating
AnyDecentMusic?	6.1/10
Metacritic	70/100
Review scores
Source	Rating
AllMusic	3/5 stars
Clash	6/10
Consequence	B
HipHopDX	3.6/5
HotNewHipHop	83%
NME	2/5 stars
Pitchfork	7.0/10
PopMatters	7/10
Rolling Stone	3.5/5 stars
XXL	4/5

The Wizrd was met with generally positive reviews. At Metacritic, which assigns a normalized rating out of 100 to reviews from professional publications, the album received an average score of 70, based on 12 reviews. The aggregator AnyDecentMusic? gave it 6.1 out of 10, based on its assessment of the critical consensus.

XXL gave the album a positive review stating, "The lean guest list of trap all-stars Young Thug, Gunna and Travis Scott delivers solid if unspectacular support down the home stretch. Diehard Future fans, of which there are legion, will be satisfied. But at 20 tracks, The Wizrd runs overlong. Jewels like 'F&N' (with its nifty beat switch), 'Promise U That' and 'Faceshot' run the risk of getting lost in all the streaming". Tommy Monroe of Consequence said, "A 20-track album is a lot. But with The WIZRD, one can barely feel it because of the smooth flow from track to track. Even the few misses don't disrupt the rhythm of the project". Rolling Stone's Charles Holmes wrote, "The Wizrd is the last album in Future's current major-label deal, and it's effective at reinforcing the qualities that turned him into a star, as well as outlining his rags-to-riches story one more time for those who weren't paying attention". Pitchfork critic Jayson Greene said, "The production is muted, minor-key, and consistently beautiful, conjuring the familiar Future Moods: rain-streaked neon signs, drug-induced stupors inside of clubs at 3 a.m. If you are content to live inside this lonely little world Future has made, he is still keeping it nice for you. What you won't find on The WIZRD is the sound of Future stretching or surprising himself". Christopher Thiessen of PopMatters said, "Though The Wizrd does run too long (as tends to be the norm nowadays), the bangers here are bangers and make this album exciting on every repeated listen. That being said, it is about time for Future to reveal the "man behind the curtain" and to move on from the excess materialism and misogyny".

In a mixed review, Clash's Malvika Padin wrote, "The world of hip-hop and rap is changing and, while Future's pattern works well, it becomes slightly repetitive with every listen". In a negative review, Dhruva Balram of NME wrote that "although The Wizrd makes concessions to rap's move towards greater introspection, these 20 tracks largely draw on the same, tired formula he's been rolling out since 2012's Pluto", concluding Future's "candidness hasn't really found its way onto The Wizrd. There's something to be said for creating music exclusively for the club or to be bumped in car stereos in the summer, but with a bland, out-dated musical architecture, The Wizrd doesn't even offer that. In an era where rap and hip-hop's sound is changing, rapidly, with introspective and socially conscious flows the norm even in the mainstream, Future seems to be mired in the past".

=== Year-end lists ===
Select year-end rankings of The Wizrd
Publication	List	Rank	Ref.
Complex	Best Albums of 2019	30	
Noisey	The 100 Best Albums of 2019	89	

== Commercial performance ==
The Wizrd debuted at number one on the US Billboard 200 with 125,000 album-equivalent units (including 15,000 pure album sales) in its first week. It is Future's sixth US number-one album. In its second week, the album dropped to number two on the chart, behind the Backstreet Boys' album, DNA, earning an additional 56,000 album-equivalent units. In its third week, the album dropped to number three on the chart, earning an additional 40,000 album-equivalent units that week. Up to May 2019, the album had earned 450,000 album-equivalent units and sold 33,000 copies in pure album sales in the United States. On December 9, 2024, The Wizrd was certified platinum by the Recording Industry Association of America (RIAA) for combined sales and streams in excess of a million units in the United States.

== Track listing ==
The Wizrd track listing
No.	Title	Writer(s)	Producer(s)	Length
1.	"Never Stop"	Nayvadius Wilburn; Jacob Canady; Eduardo Burgess; Jonathan De La Rosa	ATL Jacob; Billboard Hitmakers	4:51
2.	"Jumpin on a Jet"	Wilburn; Joshua Luellen; Cristian Castro^{[c]}; Brytavious Chambers^{[c]}	Southside	2:17
3.	"Rocket Ship"	Wilburn; Canady	ATL Jacob	1:56
4.	"Temptation"	Wilburn; Maudell Watkins; Chambers; Gary Hill^{[d]}; Leland Wayne^{[d]}	Tay Keith	2:47
5.	"Crushed Up"	Wilburn; Wesley Glass; Ricky Harrell, Jr.; Matthew Caprio	Wheezy; Ricky Racks; Matt Cap	2:30
6.	"F&N"	Wilburn; Glass; Luellen; Canady	Wheezy; Southside; ATL Jacob	3:09
7.	"Call the Coroner"	Wilburn; Bryan Simmons; Kevin Gomringer; Tim Gomringer	TM88; Cubeatz	2:11
8.	"Talk Shit Like a Preacher"	Wilburn; Canady	ATL Jacob	2:12
9.	"Promise U That"	Wilburn; Watkins; Chambers; Westen Weiss; Kyle van Riper	Tay Keith; Weiss; Van Riper	3:25
10.	"Stick to the Models"	Wilburn; Raúl Bermejo; Canady	Jambo; ATL Jacob	3:16
11.	"Overdose"	Wilburn; Luellen	Southside	1:55
12.	"Krazy But True"	Wilburn; Glass; Colin Franken; Corbin Smidzik; Derek Mondock	Wheezy; Frankie Bash^{[a]}; Corbin^{[a]}; Distance Decay^{[a]}	3:05
13.	"Servin Killa Kam"	Wilburn; Luellen; Dwan Avery	Southside; DY	3:06
14.	"Baptiize"	Wilburn; Luellen; Eduardo Earle; Javar Rockamore; Robert Reese; Theodore Thomas	Southside; Fuse; Rockamore^{[b]}; Bobby Keyz^{[b]}; Stonii^{[b]}	3:38
15.	"Unicorn Purp" (featuring Young Thug and Gunna)	Wilburn; Jeffery Williams; Sergio Kitchens; Canady	ATL Jacob	4:06
16.	"Goin Dummi"	Wilburn; Glass	Wheezy	2:11
17.	"First Off" (featuring Travis Scott)	Wilburn; Jacques Webster II; Amir Esmailian; Canady	ATL Jacob	3:48
18.	"Faceshot"	Wilburn; Tony Son	Richie Souf	2:55
19.	"Ain't Coming Back"	Wilburn; Watkins; Son	Richie Souf	3:39
20.	"Tricks on Me"	Wilburn; Paul Jefferies	Nineteen85	4:22
Total length:				61:48

Notes

- ^{^[a]} signifies a co-producer
- ^{^[b]} signifies an uncredited co-producer

Sample credits

- ^{^[c]} "Jumpin on a Jet" contains an interpolation of "Jumping Out the Jet", written by Cristian Castro and Brytavious Chambers, as performed by Ocho Sneak.
- ^{^[d]} "Temptation" contains an interpolation of "Honest", written by Nayvadius Wilburn, Gary Hill and Leland Wayne, as performed by Future.
- "Baptiize" contains an uncredited sample from "Slave Master", written by Nayvadius Wilburn, Joshua Luellen and Leland Wayne, as performed by Future.

== Personnel ==
Credits adapted from the album's liner notes.

Technical

- Bryan Anzel – recording (tracks 1, 2, 4–10, 17, 19), additional engineering (tracks 11, 12, 14–16, 18)
- Eric Manco – recording (tracks 1–3, 5, 6, 12, 15–17, 20)
- Seth Firkins – recording (tracks 11, 13, 18)
- Flo – recording (track 15)
- Jaycen Joshua – mixing (track 5)
- Manny Marroquin – mixing (tracks 1, 2, 5, 9, 10, 17)
- Fabian Marasciullo – mixing (tracks 3, 4, 6, 12, 15, 16, 18–20)
- Mike Dean – mixing (tracks 7, 8, 11, 13, 14)
- Ivy Green – mixing assistant (tracks 3, 4, 6, 12, 15, 16, 18–20)
- Jacob Richards – mixing assistant (track 5)
- Rashawn McLean – mixing assistant (track 5)
- Mike Seaberg – mixing assistant (track 5)
- Sean Solymar – mixing assistant (tracks 7, 8, 11, 13, 14)
- Colin Leonard – mastering (all tracks)
- Mike Symphony – additional engineering (tracks 3–13, 15, 18), recording (track 14)

Miscellaneous

- Spike Jordan – creative director
- Nick Walker – photographer
- Dewey Saunders – design

== Charts ==
=== Weekly charts ===
Chart performance for The Wizrd
Chart (2019–2024)	Peak position
Australian Albums (ARIA)	33
Austrian Albums (Ö3 Austria)	27
Belgian Albums (Ultratop Flanders)	21
Belgian Albums (Ultratop Wallonia)	60
Canadian Albums (Billboard)	1
Danish Albums (Hitlisten)	14
Dutch Albums (Album Top 100)	7
Finnish Albums (Suomen virallinen lista)	46
French Albums (SNEP)	26
German Albums (Offizielle Top 100)	38
Irish Albums (IRMA)	39
Italian Albums (FIMI)	91
Latvian Albums (LAIPA)	19
Lithuanian Albums (AGATA)	25
New Zealand Albums (RMNZ)	26
Nigerian Albums (TurnTable)	100
Norwegian Albums (VG-lista)	18
Swedish Albums (Sverigetopplistan)	29
Swiss Albums (Schweizer Hitparade)	10
UK Albums (Official Charts)	16
US Billboard 200	1
US Top R&B/Hip-Hop Albums (Billboard)	1

=== Year-end charts ===
2019 year-end chart performance for The Wizrd
Chart (2019)	Position
US Billboard 200	67
US Top R&B/Hip-Hop Albums (Billboard)	37

== Certifications ==
Certifications and sales for The Wizrd
Region	Certification	Certified units/sales
United States (RIAA)	Platinum	1,000,000^{‡}
^{‡} Sales+streaming figures based on certification alone.
