= Amir Esmailian =

Iranian-Canadian manager of XO Records

- Born: December 28, 1983 (age 42); Tehran, Iran
- Other names: Cash; Cash XO
- Education: Merivale High School
- Occupations: Music industry executive; talent manager; record producer
- Years active: 2011–present
- Known for: Co-founder of XO Records; co-manager of the Weeknd

Amir Esmailian (Persian: امیر اسماعیلیان; born December 28, 1983), also known as Cash and Cash XO, is an Iranian-Canadian record executive, talent manager, and record producer. He is the co-founder of XO Records and the co-manager of the label's secondary founder, Canadian singer the Weeknd.

== Early life and education ==
Amir Esmailian was born in Tehran, Iran on December 28, 1983, during the Iran–Iraq War. To flee the conflict, his family emigrated to Ottawa, Canada in 1988. Growing up, Esmailian was neighbors with future rapper and XO signee, Belly. The two would often go to recording studios together. He got his nickname, "Cash", as a child, given to him by his friend and future XO member, Hawk Marley. His first job as a 12 year-old involved making Canadian Football League trading cards. He is a graduate of Merivale High School in Ottawa.

== Career ==
In 2002, Esmailian's friend and rapper, Belly, was signed to Wassim "Sal" Slaiby's Capital Prophets label (later the CP Music Group). Slaiby also hired Esmailian as the head of street promotion for the label. At age 19 in 2003, Esmailian began traveling with rapper and friend, Juelz Santana, on his tours. In 2007, he started co-managing Belly alongside Sal, which took him to Florida in an effort to help his client break into the club scene.

While living in Miami in 2011, Esmailian's friend, Hawk Marley, sent him some of singer the Weeknd's tracks when the artist was relatively unknown. Esmailian then drove to Toronto, Canada and began managing the Weeknd. In 2012, Esmailian, Slaiby and the Weeknd founded the XO record label as a joint venture with Republic Records. Through the XO and Republic partnership, the Weeknd released several albums in the following years, including Trilogy (2012), Kiss Land (2013), and Beauty Behind the Madness (2015). The latter album would be honored with two Grammy Awards. Along with Slaiby, Esmailian was named to Billboard's "40 Under 40: Music's Young Power Players" list in 2015. Esmailian was also pivotal in the 2016 release of Starboy, the Weeknd's third studio album that debuted at number one on the US Billboard Hot 100, received triple platinum certification and won Best Urban Contemporary Album at the 2018 Grammy Awards. On March 20, 2020, XO and Republic Records released the Weeknd's fourth studio album After Hours. The album debuted and peaked at number one on the US Billboard Hot 100 and received platinum certification. In March 2020, After Hours broke the record for the most global pre-adds in Apple Music history, with over 1.02 million users.

In 2016, Esmailian discovered the Toronto-based rapper and record producer Nav, signing him to XO and becoming his co-manager. In February 2017, Nav released his debut self-titled mixtape, in which him and Esmailian were the executive producers of. Esmailian would go on to be an executive producer on Nav and Metro Boomin's collaborative mixtape, Perfect Timing, alongside the two in July of that year.

In May 2018, Nav released his debut studio album, Reckless, in 2018, in which Esmailian executive produced alongside Nav. Also in June 2018, Esmailian earned songwriting credits on the Carters' Everything is Love album with "Friends", a song in which Nav co-produced since it was an instrumental version of a track left off from Reckless. He would again earn executive producer credits alongside Nav and the Weeknd on Nav's second studio album, Bad Habits, which was released in March 2019, and debuted and peaked at number one on the Billboard 200 chart. In May 2020, Esmailian, Nav, and the Weeknd again executive produced Nav's third studio album, Good Intentions and its deluxe reissue, Brown Boy 2, the former that once again debuted and peaked at number one on the Billboard 200 chart. Esmailian is also credited as a producer for seven songs and a songwriter for nine songs on the album. In November 2020, he would go on again to be an executive producer alongside Wheezy on Nav's commercial mixtape, Emergency Tsunami.

In April 2019, Esmailian premiered 21 previously unreleased songs on the fifth episode of the Weeknd's Beats 1 radio show, Memento Mori. Tracks by Lil Uzi Vert, Young Thug, Travis Scott, Gunna, Nav, 21 Savage, Offset, Gucci Mane, Future, and others were played. In 2020, Esmailian launched a Champagne named Noirblanc, under the house name Xavier D’Orsenac.

On April 29, 2024, Esmailian's house in Encino was the target of a shooting, perpetrated by three unknown assailants who fired multiple times onto his home striking a security guard.

== Songwriting and production discography ==
List of songs written along with notes to indicate production
Year	Artist	Album	Song	Co-written with
2013	French Montana	Excuse My French	"Gifted" (featuring the Weeknd)	Karim Kharbouch, Abel Tesfaye, Ahmad Balshe, Danny Schofield
2016	Travis Scott	Birds in the Trap Sing McKnight	"Beibs in the Trap" (featuring Nav)	Jacques Webster II, Navraj Goraya
2017	Nav and Metro Boomin	Perfect Timing	"ASAP Ferg" (featuring Lil Uzi Vert)	Navraj Goraya, Leland Wayne, Symere Woods
2017	Nav and Metro Boomin	Perfect Timing	"Both Sides" (featuring 21 Savage)	Navraj Goraya, Leland Wayne, Shéyaa Abraham-Joseph
2017	Nav and Metro Boomin	Perfect Timing	"Call Me"	Navraj Goraya, Leland Wayne
2017	Nav and Metro Boomin	Perfect Timing	"Need Some" (featuring Gucci Mane)	Navraj Goraya, Leland Wayne, Radric Davis, Tim Gomringer, Kevin Gomringer
2018	Tory Lanez	Memories Don't Die	"Dance for Me" (featuring Nav)	Daystar Peterson, Navraj Goraya, Sergio Romero, Daniel Gonzalez
2018	Nav	Reckless	"Never Change"	Navraj Goraya, Danny Schofield
2018	Nav	Reckless	"Faith" (featuring Quavo)	Navraj Goraya, Quavious Marshall, Mariel Orr
2018	Nav	Reckless	"Champion" (featuring Travis Scott)	Navraj Goraya, Jacques Webster II, Ozan Yildirim, Michael Hernandez
2018	Nav	Reckless	"Glow Up"	Navraj Goraya, Danny Schofield
2018	Nav	Reckless	"Just Happened"	Navraj Goraya, Danny Schofield, Robert Richardson
2018	Nav	Reckless	"Wanted You" (featuring Lil Uzi Vert)	Navraj Goraya, Symere Woods, Khaled Khaled, Benjamin Diehl
2018	Nav	Reckless	"With Me"	Navraj Goraya, Benjamin Diehl
2018	The Carters	Everything Is Love	"Friends"	Beyoncé, Shawn Carter, Matthew Samuels, Jahaan Sweet, Rupert Thomas, Jr., Navraj Goraya, Tavoris Hollins, Jr., Brittany Coney, Denisia Andrews
2018	Tory Lanez	Love Me Now?	"Cut Me Off" (featuring Nav)	Daystar Peterson, Navraj Goraya, Javar Rockamore, Robert Reese, Theodore Thomas, Thomas Walker
2019	Future	The Wizrd	"First Off" (featuring Travis Scott)	Nayvadius Wilburn, Jacques Webster II, Jacob Canady
2019	Nav	Bad Habits	"Tap" (featuring Meek Mill)	Navraj Goraya, Robert Williams, London Holmes, Westen Weiss
2019	Nav	Bad Habits	"Tension"	Navraj Goraya, Mohkom Bhangal, Jordan Bacchus, Sugar-Ray Henry, Jason Quenneville
2019	Nav	Bad Habits	"Tussin" (featuring Young Thug)	Navraj Goraya, Jeffery Williams, Mohkom Bhangal, Jacob Canady, Ezekiel Henry
2019	Nav	Bad Habits	"Know Me"	Navraj Goraya, Andrew Franklin, Austin Schindler
2019	Nav	Bad Habits	"Amazing" (featuring Future)	Navraj Goraya, Nayvadius Wilburn, Brytavious Chambers
2020	Lil Uzi Vert	Lil Uzi Vert vs. the World 2	"Leaders" (Note: Also produced alongside Nav, Pro Logic, and Money Musik.) (featuring Nav)	Symere Woods, Navraj Goraya, Andrew Franklin, Mohkom Bhangal
2020	Nav	Good Intentions	"No Debate" (Note: Also produced alongside Nav, Wheezy, Pro Logic, and Money Musik.) (featuring Young Thug)	Navraj Goraya, Jeffery Williams, Wesley Glass, Andrew Franklin, Mohkom Bhangal
2020	Nav	Good Intentions	"My Business" (Note: Also produced alongside Pro Logic and Neal & Alex.) (featuring Future)	Navraj Goraya, Nayvadius Wilburn, Andrew Franklin
2020	Nav	Good Intentions	"Turks" (with Gunna featuring Travis Scott)	Navraj Goraya, Sergio Kitchens, Jacques Webster II, Wesley Glass
2020	Nav	Good Intentions	"Status" (Note: Also produced alongside Nav, Pro Logic, and Keanu Beats.) (featuring Lil Uzi Vert)	Navraj Goraya, Symere Woods, Keanu Torres
2020	Nav	Good Intentions	"Codeine" (featuring Gunna)	Navraj Goraya, Sergio Kitchens, Andrew Franklin
2020	Nav	Good Intentions	"Saint Laurenttt" (Note: Also produced alongside Pro Logic, Wallis Lane, and Nabeyin.)	Navraj Goraya, Andrew Franklin, Nima Jahanbin, Paimon Jahanbin
2020	Nav	Good Intentions	"Run It Up" (Note: Also produced alongside Pro Logic and Money Musik.) (featuring Pop Smoke)	Navraj Goraya, Bashar Jackson, Andrew Franklin, Mohkom Bhangal, Windsor Lubin
2020	Nav	Good Intentions	"Spend It" (Note: Also produced alongside Wheezy, Bkorn, and Pro Logic.) (featuring Young Thug)	Navraj Goraya, Jeffery Williams, Wesley Glass, Brandon Korn
2020	Nav	Good Intentions	"No Ice" (Note: Also produced alongside Pro Logic and Dez Wright.) (featuring Lil Durk)	Navraj Goraya, Durk Banks, Andrew Franklin, Dylan-Cleary Krell
2020	Future	High Off Life	"Solitaires" (featuring Travis Scott)	Nayvadius Wilburn, Jacques Webster II, Wesley Glass
2020	Nav	Emergency Tsunami	"Breaking News Intro"	—N/a
2020	Nav	Emergency Tsunami	"Friends & Family"	Navraj Goraya, Wesley Glass, Jasper Harris
2020	Nav	Emergency Tsunami	"Young Wheezy" (with Gunna)	Navraj Goraya, Sergio Kitchens, Wesley Glass
2020	Nav	Emergency Tsunami	"Nasty"	Navraj Goraya, Wesley Glass, Colin Franken, Corey French
2020	Nav	Emergency Tsunami	"Repercussions" (with Young Thug)	Navraj Goraya, Jeffery Williams, Wesley Glass, Sean Momberger
2020	Nav	Emergency Tsunami	"Vetement Socks"	Navraj Goraya, Wesley Glass, Chandler Durham, Colin Franken, Alexander Bak
2020	Nav	Emergency Tsunami	"Don't Need Friends" (featuring Lil Baby)	Navraj Goraya, Dominique Jones, Wesley Glass, Andrew Franklin
2020	Nav	Emergency Tsunami	"Make It Right Back"	Navraj Goraya, Wesley Glass, Robert Richardson
2020	Nav	Emergency Tsunami	"Trains" (with Lil Keed)	Navraj Goraya, Raqhid Render, Wesley Glass
2020	Nav	Emergency Tsunami	"Do Ya Deed" (featuring SahBabii)	Navraj Goraya, Saaheem Valdery, Wesley Glass
2020	Nav	Emergency Tsunami	"Droppin Tears"	Navraj Goraya, Wesley Glass, Sugar-Ray Henry
2020	Nav	Emergency Tsunami	"Modest"	Navraj Goraya, Wesley Glass, Sugar-Ray Henry
2020	Nav	Emergency Tsunami	"Turn & Twist"	Navraj Goraya, Wesley Glass, Colin Franken
2020	Nav	Emergency Tsunami	"Breaking News Outro"	—N/a
2020	Nav	Emergency Tsunami	"Pickney"	Navraj Goraya, Wesley Glass
2020	Nav	Emergency Tsunami	"Stella McCartney" (featuring Future)	Navraj Goraya, Nayvadius Wilburn, Wesley Glass
2021	Rowdy Rebel	Non-album single	"Jesse Owens" (featuring Nav)	Chad Marshall, Navraj Goraya, Andrew Franklin
2022	Nav	Demons Protected by Angels	"Dead Shot" (with Lil Uzi Vert)	Navraj Goraya, Symere Woods, Andrew Franklin
2022	Nav	Demons Protected by Angels	"One Time" (with Don Toliver featuring Future)	Navraj Goraya, Caleb Toliver, Nayvadius Wilburn, Dylan Cleary-Krell
2022	Nav	Demons Protected by Angels	"Weirdo"	Navraj Goraya, Wesley Glass, Chandler Ingram
2022	Nav	Demons Protected by Angels	"My Dawg" (with Lil Durk)	Navraj Goraya, Durk Banks, Andrew Franklin, Keanu Torres, Fabio Aguilar
2022	Nav	Demons Protected by Angels	"Interstellar" (with Lil Uzi Vert)	Navraj Goraya, Symere Woods, Andrew Franklin, Patrick Piscot, Jeppe Jacobsen
2022	Nav	Demons Protected by Angels	"Lost Me" (with RealestK)	Navraj Goraya, Rony Kordab, Luke Honeywood, Patrick Bodi
2022	Nav	Demons Protected by Angels	"Reset" (Note: Also produced alongside Nav and Pro Logic.) (with Bryson Tiller)	Navraj Goraya, Bryson Tiller, Andrew Franklin
2022	Nav	Demons Protected by Angels	"Mismatch" (with Babyface Ray)	Navraj Goraya, Marcellus Register, Wesley Glass, Mohkom Bhangal
2023	Don Toliver	Love Sick	"Embarrassed" (featuring Travis Scott)	Caleb Toliver, Jacques Webster II, Wesley Glass, Dylan Cleary-Krell, Douglas Ford
2023	Travis Scott	Utopia	"Topia Twins" (featuring Rob49 and 21 Savage)	Jacques Webster II, Robert Thomas, Shéyaa Abraham-Joseph, Wesley Glass, Oliver Rodigan, Dylan Cleary-Krell, Henri Velasco
