= Good Intentions (album) =

Studio album by Nav
- Released: May 8, 2020
- Recorded: 2019–2020
- Genres: Hip hop; trap
- Length: 49:48
- Labels: XO; Republic
- Producers: Nav; Bkorn; BLWYRMND; Cardo; Dez Wright; Fabio Aguilar; Gylttryp; Jack LoMastro; Joe Hodges; Keanu Beats; Luca Starz; Money Musik; Mike Bliss; Mustard; Nabeyin; Neal & Alex; Nik Dean; Philipp Rodrian; Pro Logic; Saif; Shucati; Vov; Wallis Lane; Mookie; Wheezy

Nav chronology
Bad Habits (2019)	Good Intentions (2020)	Brown Boy 2 (2020)

Singles from Good Intentions
- 1. "Turks" Released: March 27, 2020

Good Intentions is the third studio album by Canadian rapper Nav. It was released on May 8, 2020, by XO Records and Republic Records. It follows his second studio album, Bad Habits, which was released in 2019. The album features guest appearances from Young Thug, Future, Gunna, Travis Scott, Lil Uzi Vert, Pop Smoke, Don Toliver, and Lil Durk. The re-release of the album, titled Brown Boy 2, the deluxe edition and a sequel to his 2019 unofficial Brown Boy EP, was released three days later, on May 11, 2020. It features additional guest appearances from Quavo and Lil Duke.

Professional ratings
Aggregate scores
Source	Rating
Metacritic	54/100
Review scores
Source	Rating
AllMusic	3/5 stars
Exclaim!	3/10
HipHopDX	2.5/5 stars
Pitchfork	5.8/10

The album was met with mixed reviews from contemporary critics. At the aggregate site Metacritic, which assigns a normalized rating out of 100 to reviews from professional publications, the album received an average score of 54, based on 4 reviews, indicating “Mixed or Average Reviews”.

== Background ==
On April 27, 2020, Nav announced the follow-up to his sophomore studio album, Bad Habits, which was released on March 22, 2019. Alongside the announcement, he revealed the album's trailer with teased potential features from American rappers Lil Uzi Vert and the late Pop Smoke, showing clips of him talking to both rappers.

"I had goals written down of going No. 1. I had a vision board in my room with all the things I want. This year, I pretty much got all of them. I believe in [the] law of attraction a lot."

== Singles ==
The album's lead single, "Turks" with Gunna featuring Travis Scott, was released for digital download on March 27, 2020. The song was produced by Wheezy. The music video was released on March 30, 2020. The music video was directed by Nav's manager Cash, who also co-wrote the song, and Zac Facts. The song peaked at number 45 on the Billboard Canadian Hot 100. The song also peaked at number 17 on the Billboard Hot 100, making it Nav's highest-charting song both as a lead or, at the time of the song’s release, featured artist.

== Commercial performance ==
Good Intentions debuted at number one on the US Billboard 200 chart, earning 135,000 album-equivalent units (including 73,000 copies as pure album sales) in its first week. This became Nav's second US number-one album. The album also accumulated a total of 84.8 million on-demand streams of the album's songs during the tracking week. In its second week, the album dropped to number ten on the chart, earning an additional 35,000 units.

In his home country of Canada, the album debuted at number one on the Canadian Albums Chart, earning 10,000 album-equivalent units in its first week. This became Nav's second number-one debut on the chart.

== Track listing ==
Credits adapted from Tidal, and Nav's Instagram for the deluxe edition.

Good Intentions
No.	Title	Writer(s)	Producer(s)	Length
1.	"Good Intentions (Intro)"	Navraj Goraya; Andrew Franklin; Nima Jahanbin; Paimon Jahanbin	Nav; Pro Logic; Wallis Lane; Jack LoMastro^{[b]}	2:35
2.	"No Debate" (featuring Young Thug)	Goraya; Jeffery Williams; Amir Esmailian; Wesley Glass; Franklin; Mohkom Bhangal	Nav; Cash; Wheezy; Pro Logic; Money Musik	2:08
3.	"My Business" (featuring Future)	Goraya; Nayvadius Wilburn; Esmailian; Franklin	Cash; Pro Logic; Neal & Alex	3:19
4.	"Turks" (with Gunna featuring Travis Scott)	Goraya; Sergio Kitchens; Jacques Webster II; Esmailian; Glass	Wheezy	2:41
5.	"Brown Boy"	Goraya; Franklin; Simon Schranz; Livingston Allen	Pro Logic; Blwyrmnd	2:14
6.	"Status" (featuring Lil Uzi Vert)	Goraya; Symere Woods; Esmailian; Keanu Torres	Nav; Cash; Pro Logic; Keanu Beats	2:54
7.	"Codeine" (featuring Gunna)	Goraya; Kitchens; Esmailian; Franklin	Nav; Pro Logic	3:08
8.	"Saint Laurenttt"	Goraya; Esmailian; Franklin; N. Jahanbin; P. Jahanbin	Cash; Pro Logic; Wallis Lane; Nabeyin^{[a]}	2:50
9.	"Coast to Coast"	Goraya; Franklin; Saif Khan	Pro Logic; Saif	2:33
10.	"Run It Up" (featuring Pop Smoke)	Goraya; Bashar Jackson; Esmailian; Franklin; Bhangal; Windsor Lubin	Cash; Pro Logic; Money Musik	2:59
11.	"Spend It" (featuring Young Thug)	Goraya; Williams; Esmailian; Glass; Brandon Korn	Cash; Wheezy; Pro Logic; Bkorn	2:39
12.	"Recap" (featuring Don Toliver)	Goraya; Caleb Toliver; Ronald LaTour; Dylan Cleary-Krell	Cardo; Dez Wright	2:23
13.	"She Hurtin"	Goraya; Franklin; N. Jahanbin; P. Jahanbin	Pro Logic; Wallis Lane; VoV^{[a]}	3:06
14.	"Overdose"	Goraya; Franklin; Joseph Hodges	Pro Logic; Joe Hodges	2:57
15.	"Did You Wrong"	Goraya; Dijon McFarlane; Shah Rukh Zaman Khan	Mustard; GYLTTRYP^{[a]}	2:29
16.	"My Space"	Goraya; Franklin; Dejan Nikolic	Pro Logic; Nik Dean	2:55
17.	"No Ice" (featuring Lil Durk)	Goraya; Durk Banks; Esmailian; Franklin; Cleary-Krell	Cash; Pro Logic; Dez Wright	3:01
18.	"Proud of Me?"	Goraya; Franklin; Tim Friedrich; Christoph Bauss	Pro Logic; Shucati	2:56
Total length:				49:48

Credits adapted from Tidal.

Deluxe – Brown Boy 2
No.	Title	Writer(s)	Producer(s)	Length
1.	"I'm Up"	Goraya; Brytavious Chambers; Tahj Morgan; Nils Nöehden	JetsonMade; Tay Keith; Nils	2:47
2.	"Relax"	Goraya; Franklin; Jugraj Nagra; Dorian McKnight	Pro Logic; Nagra; Sidepce	2:18
3.	"Chirp" (featuring Quavo)	Goraya; Quavious Marshall; Franklin; Bhangal	Pro Logic; Money Musik	2:50
4.	"Frequently"	Goraya; Franklin; Bhangal	Pro Logic; Money Musik	2:52
5.	"Sprite Clean"	Goraya; Bhangal; Herman Atwal	Money Musik	2:35
6.	"Free Santana" (featuring Lil Duke)	Goraya; Arnold Martinez; Franklin; Bhangal	Pro Logic; Money Musik	2:55
7.	"Heat"	Goraya	Nav	2:19
8.	"No Time"	Goraya; Franklin; Jack Cohen-Mungan; Jack Cornelius	Pro Logic; AudioJacc	2:59
9.	"Yessir"	Goraya; Malik Johnson; Michael Kafandaris	1K; Mike Bliss	2:41
10.	"Pine Soul"	Goraya; Franklin; Jordan Fox	Pro Logic; Fox	2:29
11.	"Two Face"	Goraya; Franklin; Nikolic; Divashen	Pro Logic; Nik Dean	3:13
12.	"Extra"	Goraya	Money Musik	2:04
13.	"Ain't Goin Back"	Goraya; Franklin; N. Jahanbin; P. Jahanbin; Austin Schindler; Jeffrey Rashad	Pro Logic; Wallis Lane; Austin Powerz; Rashad	2:58
14.	"Bag"	Goraya; Glass; Masamune Kudo; Corbin Smidzik	Wheezy; Rex Kudo	2:40
Total length:				81:45

Notes

- ^{^[a]} signifies a co-producer
- ^{^[b]} signifies an additional producer
- ^{^[c]} signifies an uncredited co-producer
- "Bag" contains additional vocals by Corbin

== Personnel ==
All programming and keyboards are credited to the producers of each track.

- Ethan Stevens – engineering (track 4)
- Raphael Mesquita – recording assistant (track 4)
- Pro Logic – mixing (all tracks), uncredited engineering (all tracks)
- Mike Dean – uncredited mixing (track 4)
- Colin Leonard – mastering (all tracks)

== Charts ==
=== Weekly charts ===
Chart performance for Good Intentions
Chart (2020)	Peak position
Belgian Albums (Ultratop Flanders)	32
Belgian Albums (Ultratop Wallonia)	118
Canadian Albums (Billboard)	1
Dutch Albums (Album Top 100)	33
French Albums (SNEP)	51
German Albums (Offizielle Top 100)	92
Irish Albums (IRMA)	59
New Zealand Albums (RMNZ)	30
Norwegian Albums (VG-lista)	38
Swiss Albums (Schweizer Hitparade)	27
UK Albums (Official Charts)	18
US Billboard 200	1
US Top R&B/Hip-Hop Albums (Billboard)	1

=== Year-end charts ===
2020 year-end chart performance for Good Intentions
Chart (2020)	Position
US Billboard 200	126
US Top R&B/Hip-Hop Albums (Billboard)	64

== Certifications ==
Region	Certification	Certified units/sales
Canada (Music Canada)	Platinum	80,000^{‡}
^{‡} Sales+streaming figures based on certification alone.
