= Frankie Bash =

American singer-songwriter

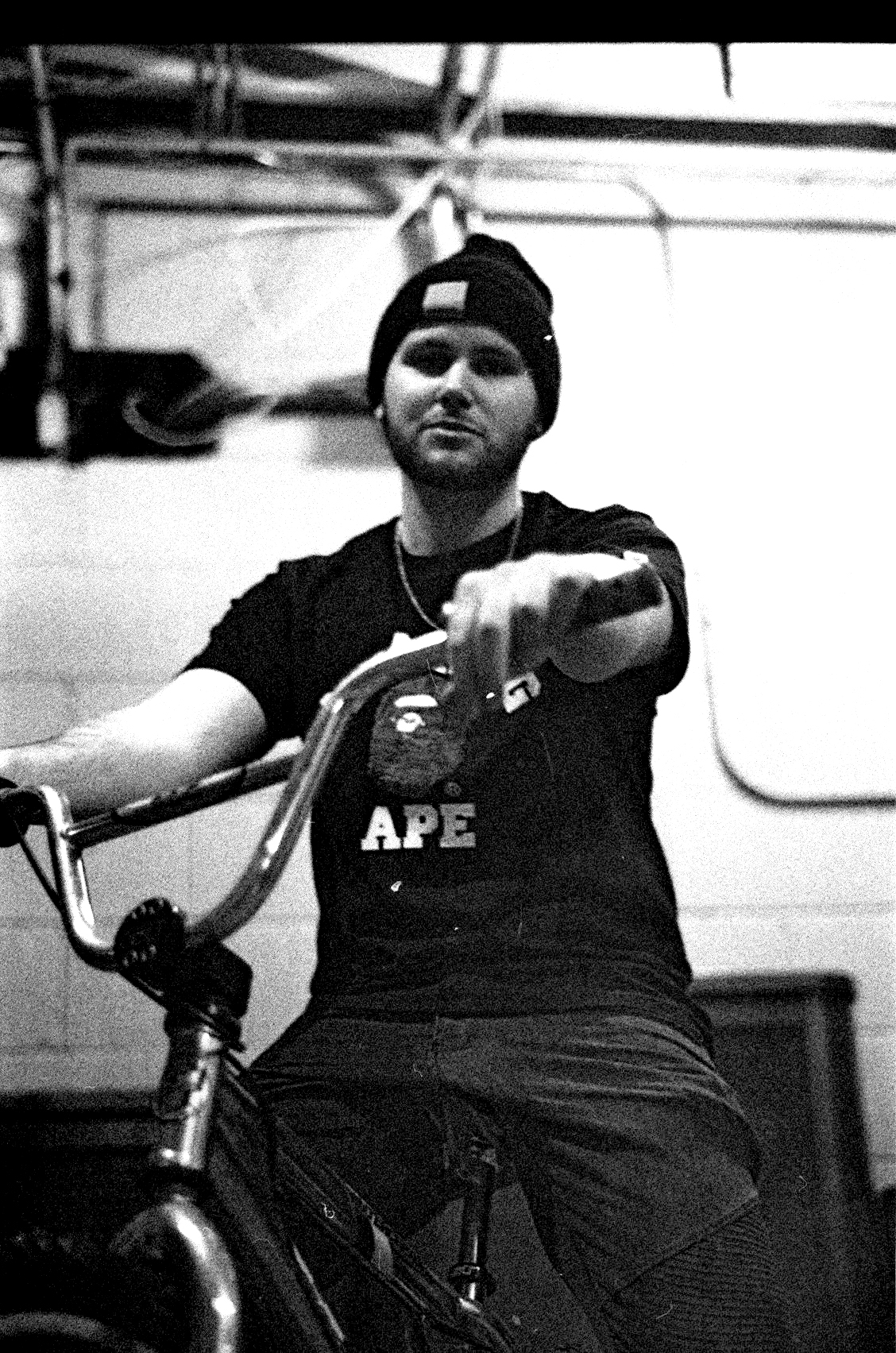

Background information
- Also known as: Frankie Bash
- Born: Colin Franken; May 16, 1993 (age 33); Minneapolis, Minnesota, U.S.
- Origin: St. Paul, Minnesota, U.S.
- Genres: Hip hop; trap; R&B
- Occupations: Record producer; songwriter; rapper; singer
- Instruments: Ableton Live; Logic Pro
- Years active: 2015–present

Colin Franken (born May 16, 1993), known professionally as Frankie Bash, is an American record producer, songwriter, rapper, and singer. Bash has worked with artists such as Future, Juice Wrld, NAV, Gunna, YoungBoy Never Broke Again, Gucci Mane, Offset, Nimic Revenue, Bobby Raps and Wheezy.

== Discography ==
=== 2017 ===
- Timelapse (mixtape)

=== 2018 ===
- Spaceboy Level 1: Circa 2015 (mixtape)
- Bettiana EP with R.A.D (mixtape)

== Production credits ==
=== 2018 ===
==== Nimic Revenue ====
- 00. "Decline"

==== Lil Durk – Only The Family Involved Vol. 1 ====
- 06. "Happy Gilmore" (featuring Nimic Revenue)

==== Bobby Raps – WeirdLilWorld ====
- 15. "Cause I'm Sad..." (produced with Blanda and Bobby Raps)

==== Future and Juice Wrld – Wrld on Drugs ====
- 10. "Realer n Realer" (produced with Wheezy)

=== 2019 ===
==== Future – The Wizrd ====
- 12. "Krazy But True" (produced with Wheezy, Distance Decay and Corbin)

==== Nimic Revenue ====
- 00. Awlorn Gang

==== Nimic Revenue – Undisputed ====
- 12. Therapy

==== Nimic Revenue – Lifeline (EP) ====
- 1. Tattoo
- 2. Kim K
- 3. Paramount
- 4. Yeah Featuring DaniLeigh
- 5. Kawasaki
- 6. Way We Chill
- 7. Lifeline (produced with drodro)
- 8. Almost Made It
- 9. Wedding Cake
- 10. 38
- 11. Butterfly
- 12. Greenroom featuring Chief Keef (produced with Relly)

==== Offset featuring Young Thug – Control the Streets, Vol. 2 ====
- 15. Big Rocks (produced with Thank You Fizzle and Wheezy)

==== R.A.D Featuring Corbin – Dykon ====
- 13. Bone Yard (produced with Corbin, Drodro)

=== 2020 ===
==== Lil Gotit ====
- 01. So Slime (produced with AR and Bak)

==== Nimic Revenue ====
- 01. P.O.M.E. featuring Calboy

==== Nimic Revenue ====
- 01. Win Again

==== Gunna – Wunna ====
- 01. ARGENTINA (produced with Morgan O'Connor and Wheezy)

==== Gucci Mane – So Icy Summer ====
- 02. Rain Shower featuring Young Thug (produced with Al B, Armen and Wheezy)

==== NAV – Emergency Tsunami ====
- 04. Nasty (produced with Wheezy and Singrinch)
- 06. Vetement Socks (produced with Wheezy, Turbo and Bak)
- 10. Do Ya Deed featuring Sahbabii (produced with Wheezy and Bak)

==== YoungBoy Never Broke Again – Until I Return ====
- 04. Toxic (produced with ABonTheBeat, Bak and JULiA LEWiS)

=== 2021 ===
==== Baby Keem & Kendrick Lamar ====
- 01. Family Ties (produced with Cardo, Outtatown, Roselilah, Deats and, Jasper Harris)

==== Lil Gotit – Top Chef Gotit ====
- 11. Waptopia (produced with Hurtboy AG, ManOhManFoster, and Bak)

==== Yung Gravy – Gravy Train Down Memory Lane: Side A ====
- 01. Skiing in Japan Freestyle (produced with Armaen Abramian)

==== Kevin Gates – Only the Generals, Pt. II ====
- 01. Send That Load (produced with Section 8, and Bak)

==== Money Man – Blockchain ====
- 04. Numerology (produced with Section 8, Chi Chi, Todd Pritchard)

==== Bobby Fishscale – The Evolution ====
- 06. Sellin Dat Shit (produced with Section 8)

==== Corbin – Ghost With Skin ====
- 15. Reaper (produced with Drodro)

==== D Smoke – War & Wonders ====
- 11. Say Go (produced with Jasper Harris, Tom Levesque, Chords, Kayron, R.W)

==== SSGKobe – KO. ====
- 06. Capsules (produced with Bak)

=== 2022 ===
==== Yeat – 2 Alive ====
- 01. Kant Die (produced with Trgc)

==== Lil Gotit – The Cheater ====
- 03. Now We Getting Money Featuring Lil Keed & Lil PJ (produced with Xavi, DASPACEBOY, Skipass, West)
- 18. Thoughts About My Ex (produced with Bak, Skipass, West)

==== Jack Harlow – Come Home the Kids Miss You ====
- 09. I Got a Shot
