= Turks (song) =

2020 single by Nav and Gunna featuring Travis Scott

Single by Nav and Gunna featuring Travis Scott

from the album Good Intentions
- Released: March 27, 2020
- Genre: Trap
- Length: 2:41
- Label: XO; Republic
- Songwriters: Navraj Goraya; Sergio Kitchens; Jacques Webster II; Amir Esmailian; Wesley Glass
- Producer: Wheezy

Nav singles chronology
"Called It" (2019)	"Turks" (2020)	"Painless 2" (2020)

Gunna singles chronology
"Skybox" (2020)	"Turks" (2020)	"Numbers" (2020)

Travis Scott singles chronology
"Out West" (2020)	"Turks" (2020)	"The Scotts" (2020)

Music video
- "Turks" on YouTube

"Turks" is a song by Canadian rapper Nav and American rapper Gunna featuring fellow American rapper and singer Travis Scott. It was released on March 27, 2020, through XO and Republic as the only single from the former's third studio album, Good Intentions. The song was written by the artists alongside Cash XO and producer Wheezy. The official music video was released on March 30, 2020. The title of the song is a reference to the Turks and Caicos Islands. The three artists previously collaborated on Scott's single "Yosemite", from his third studio album, Astroworld (2018).

== Background ==
"Turks" marks the first new material from Nav since the release of his second studio album, Bad Habits, as well as his first release in a year as a lead artist since the album, which was released on March 22, 2019. The song was first teased on January 26, 2020, in a video posted on Instagram by a Travis Scott fan page. The video showed Nav and Scott at the birthday party of Nav's XO manager and XO co-founder Cash, playing their respective verses to "short eight-bar increments". The song was eventually released on March 27, 2020, following an Instagram Live session between Nav and Gunna on March 25, 2020. All three artists had previously collaborated on Scott's song "Yosemite", from Scott's third studio album Astroworld, in August 2018. The song's title is a reference to the Caribbean islands Turks and Caicos, a territory occasionally appearing on a list of proposed new Canadian provinces and territories. When the final version of the song was released on March 27, 2020, Gunna and Travis Scott's verses were switched.

== Composition and lyrics ==
"Turks" is a "trap-heavy anthem". On the song, the rappers each "ride the beat with their melodic rapping", a trademark of all three artists, mimicking each other's flows. Jordan Darville of The Fader said Nav's flow on the track is reminiscent of the rapping employed on Young Thug's "Hot" (also featuring Gunna and produced by Wheezy), as well as Roddy Ricch's flow on "The Box". The song is dedicated to the Turks and Caicos Islands, which all three artists and Wheezy visited in February 2020. In the chorus, Nav references this, singing "Took 20 bitches on my first vacay/ I ain't pickin' up, I'm in Turks, lil' baby". With a BPM of 119, the song is in the key of C Minor.

== Commercial performance ==
"Turks" reached number one on Apple Music the same day it was released. It marks Nav's highest-charting single as a lead artist on the Billboard Hot 100, debuting at number 17. However, he later garnered his first highest-charting single in total later in the year with Internet Money and Gunna's single "Lemonade", which also features American rapper and singer Don Toliver, a fellow labelmate of Travis Scott.

== Music video ==
The song's official video, starring the three artists, premiered on Nav's YouTube channel on March 30, 2020. Directed by Nav's XO label boss Cash and Zac Facts, it was filmed on a military base and finds the artists in the Turks and Caicos Islands as they are surrounded by an army of female soldiers, tanks, and heavy artillery. Nav is seen waving the XO label flag in the video. Young Thug, a close friend and frequent collaborator of the three artists, makes a cameo appearance.

== Charts ==
=== Weekly charts ===
Chart (2020)	Peak position
Austria (Ö3 Austria Top 40)	75
Canada Hot 100 (Billboard)	45
Hungary (Stream Top 40)	37
Ireland (IRMA)	60
Lithuania (AGATA)	43
New Zealand Hot Singles (RMNZ)	5
Portugal (AFP)	83
Slovakia Singles Digital (ČNS IFPI)	75
Sweden Heatseeker (Sverigetopplistan)	18
Switzerland (Schweizer Hitparade)	63
UK Singles (Official Charts)	54
US Billboard Hot 100	17
US Hot R&B/Hip-Hop Songs (Billboard)	9
US Rhythmic Airplay (Billboard)	20

=== Year-end charts ===
Chart (2020)	Position
US Hot R&B/Hip-Hop Songs (Billboard)	91

== Certifications ==
Region	Certification	Certified units/sales
Brazil (Pro-Música Brasil)	Gold	20,000^{‡}
Canada (Music Canada)	3× Platinum	240,000^{‡}
New Zealand (RMNZ)	Gold	15,000^{‡}
United States (RIAA)	2× Platinum	2,000,000^{‡}
^{‡} Sales+streaming figures based on certification alone.

== Release history ==
Country	Date	Format	Label	Ref.
Various	March 27, 2020	Digital download; streaming	Republic	
United States	March 31, 2020	Rhythmic contemporary radio	Republic	
