= Nav discography =

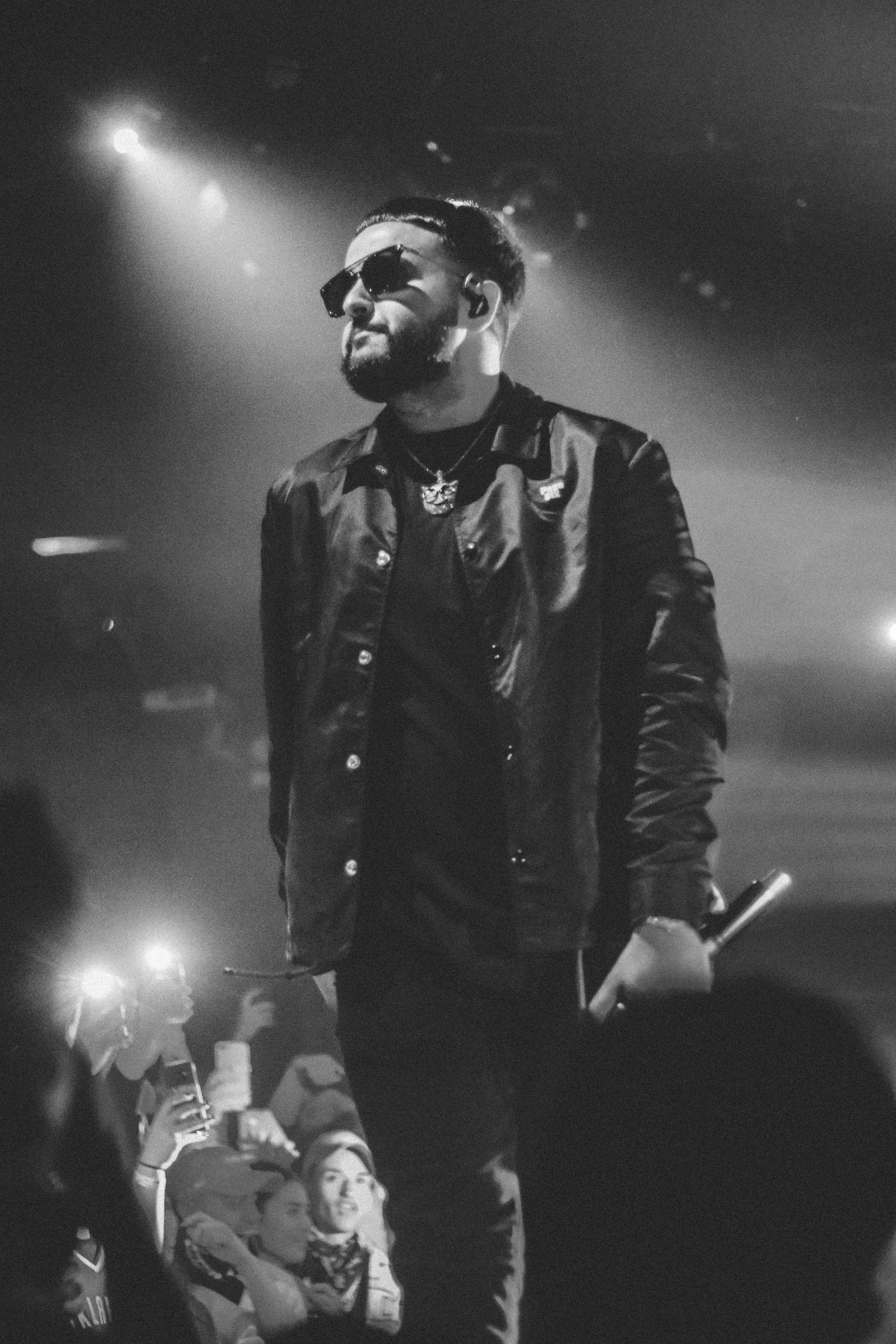
- Nav in 2018
- Studio albums: 5
- EPs: 1
- Singles: 49
- Music videos: 27
- Mixtapes: 2
- Music videos: 22
- Collaborative mixtapes: 1

The discography of Canadian rapper and record producer Nav consists of five studio albums, one reissued album, three mixtapes, and 49 singles (including 17 as a featured artist).

On February 24, 2017, Nav released his self-titled debut commercial mixtape. The mixtape reached number four on the Canadian Albums Chart and number 24 on the US Billboard 200. It produced the Canadian top-40 single, "Some Way", which features the Weeknd and reached number 31 on the Canadian Hot 100. Nav released a collaborative mixtape with Metro Boomin titled Perfect Timing on July 21, 2017. The mixtape reached number seven on the Canadian Albums Chart and number 13 on the US Billboard 200. He released his debut studio album, Reckless, on May 18, 2018. The album debuted and peaked at number five on the Canadian Albums Chart and number eight on the US Billboard 200. It produced the Canadian top-40 single, "Wanted You" from 2017, which features Lil Uzi Vert and reached number 33.

On March 22, 2019, Nav released his second studio album, Bad Habits. The album debuted and peaked atop the Canadian Albums Chart and the US Billboard 200, giving him his first chart-topping project. It produced the Canadian top-40 single, "Price on My Head", which features the Weeknd and reached number 18, giving him his highest-charting song as a lead artist in Canada. Nav released his third studio album, Good Intentions, on May 8, 2020. The album debuted and peaked atop the Canadian Albums Chart and the US Billboard 200, giving him his second chart-topping project, which was also consecutive. It produced the US top-20 single, "Turks", a collaboration with Gunna that features Travis Scott and debuted and peaked at number 17 on the US Billboard Hot 100, giving Nav his highest-charting song in the US. Three days later, Nav released a reissued album, Brown Boy 2, which consists of another album's worth of songs that serves as the deluxe edition to Good Intentions. He released his second commercial mixtape, Emergency Tsunami, on November 6, 2020. The mixtape debuted and peaked at number five on the Canadian Albums Chart and number six on the US Billboard 200.

On September 9, 2022, Nav released his fourth studio album, Demons Protected by Angels. The album debuted and peaked at number two on both the Canadian Albums Chart and the US Billboard 200. It produced the Canadian top-40 single, "Never Sleep", a collaboration with Lil Baby that features Travis Scott and debuted and peaked at number 23. In 2023, Nav released a collaboration with Metro Boomin and Swae Lee titled "Calling", which features A Boogie wit da Hoodie and reached number 18 on the Canadian Hot 100. He released his fifth studio album, OMW2 Rexdale, on March 28, 2025. The album debuted and peaked at number 34 on the Canadian Albums Chart and number 37 on the US Billboard 200.

Nav has also been featured on several songs that have received mainstream success. In 2018, he appeared alongside Gunna on Travis Scott's single, "Yosemite", which debuted and peaked at number 18 on the Canadian Hot 100 and number 25 on the US Billboard Hot 100. In 2020, he was featured on Internet Money, Gunna, and Don Toliver's single, "Lemonade", which peaked at number three on the Canadian Hot 100 and number six on the US Billboard Hot 100, giving him his highest-charting song overall.

== Studio albums ==
List of studio albums, with year released
Title	Album details	Peak chart positions										Certifications
Title	Album details	CAN	BEL (FL)	FRA	IRE	NLD	NZ	UK	US	US R&B /HH	US Rap	Certifications
Reckless	Released: May 18, 2018; Labels: XO, Republic; Format: CD, digital download, streaming	5	110	—	—	42	—	24	8	5	5	MC: Platinum; RIAA: Gold
Bad Habits	Released: March 22, 2019; Labels: XO, Republic; Format: CD, LP, digital download, streaming	1	76	112	79	20	36	26	1	1	1	MC: Platinum; RIAA: Gold
Good Intentions	Released: May 8, 2020; Labels: XO, Republic; Format: CD, LP, cassette, digital download, streaming	1	32	51	59	33	30	18	1	1	1	MC: Platinum
Demons Protected by Angels	Released: September 9, 2022; Labels: XO, Republic; Format: CD, digital download, streaming	2	—	167	—	—	—	55	2	1	1	
OMW2 Rexdale	Released: March 28, 2025; Labels: XO, Republic; Format: CD, digital download, streaming	34	—	—	—	—	—	—	37	14	10	
"—" denotes a recording that did not chart or was not released in that territory.

== Deluxe albums ==
Title	Details
Brown Boy 2	Released: May 11, 2020; Labels: XO, Republic; Format: Digital download, streaming

== Mixtapes ==
List of mixtapes, with selected chart positions
Title	Album details	Peak chart positions								Certifications
Title	Album details	CAN	BEL (FL)	FRA	NLD	NZ Heat.	US	US R&B /HH	US Rap	Certifications
The Introduction	Released: September 4, 2016; Format: Digital download; Labels: Self-released	—	—	—	—	—	—	—	—	
Nav	Released: February 24, 2017; Format: Digital download; Labels: XO, Republic	4	—	—	—	1	24	12	9	MC: Platinum; RIAA: Gold
Perfect Timing (with Metro Boomin)	Released: July 21, 2017; Format: Digital download; Labels: Boominati, XO, Republic	7	127	191	60	1	13	7	7	MC: Gold; RIAA: Gold
Emergency Tsunami	Released: November 6, 2020; Labels: XO, Republic; Format: Digital download	5	—	158	—	—	6	4	4	
"—" denotes a recording that did not chart or was not released in that territory.

== Extended plays ==
Title	EP details
1 Night (with Guap Tarantino)	Released: October 17, 2018; Labels: Freebandz, XO; Format: Digital download
Brown Boy	Released: March 14, 2019; Label: XO, Republic; Format: Digital download

== Singles ==
=== As lead artist ===
List of singles as lead artist, with selected chart positions
Title	Year	Peak chart positions										Certifications	Album
Title	Year	CAN	AUS	IRE	NZ	POR	UK	US	US R&B/HH	US Rap	WW	Certifications	Album
"Brown Boy 1"	2015	—	—	—	—	—	—	—	—	—	—		Non-album singles
"The Man"	2015	—	—	—	—	—	—	—	—	—	—		Non-album singles
"Nothing on You"	2015	—	—	—	—	—	—	—	—	—	—		Non-album singles
"Take Me Simple"	2016	—	—	—	—	—	—	—	—	—	—		Non-album singles
"On My Own"	2016	—	—	—	—	—	—	—	—	—	—		Non-album singles
"Fell in Love"	2016	—	—	—	—	—	—	—	—	—	—		Non-album singles
"Some Way" (featuring the Weeknd)	2017	31	—	—	—	—	—	— (Note: "Some Way" did not enter the Billboard Hot 100, but peaked at number one on the Bubbling Under Hot 100 chart.)	38	25	—	MC: 4× Platinum; BPI: Silver; RIAA: 2× Platinum; RMNZ: Gold	Nav
"Myself"	2017	—	—	—	—	—	—	—	— (Note: "Myself" did not enter the Billboard Hot R&B/Hip-Hop Songs chart, but peaked at number five on the Bubbling Under R&B/Hip-Hop Singles chart.)	—	—	MC: 4× Platinum; BPI: Silver; RIAA: 3× Platinum; RMNZ: Gold	Nav
"Perfect Timing (Intro)" (with Metro Boomin)	2017	89	—	—	—	—	—	—	—	—	—		Perfect Timing
"Call Me" (with Metro Boomin)	2017	65	—	—	—	—	—	— (Note: "Call Me" did not enter the Billboard Hot 100, but peaked at number 25 on the Bubbling Under Hot 100 chart.)	— (Note: "Call Me" did not enter the Billboard Hot R&B/Hip-Hop Songs chart, but peaked at number three on the Bubbling Under R&B/Hip-Hop Singles chart.)	—	—	MC: 2× Platinum; RIAA: Platinum	Perfect Timing
"Wanted You" (featuring Lil Uzi Vert)	2017	33	—	—	—	—	—	64	27	23	—	MC: 4× Platinum; RIAA: 2× Platinum; RMNZ: Gold	Reckless
"Freshman List"	2018	49	—	—	—	—	—	—	—	—	—	MC: Platinum	Reckless
"Champion" (featuring Travis Scott)	2018	47	—	—	—	—	—	86	43	—	—	MC: 4× Platinum; BPI: Silver; RIAA: 2× Platinum; RMNZ: Gold	Reckless
"Know Me"	2018	63	—	—	—	—	—	—	—	—	—		Bad Habits
"Price on My Head" (featuring the Weeknd)	2019	18	—	—	― (Note: "Price on My Head" did not enter the NZ Top 40 Singles Chart, but peaked at number 12 on the NZ Hot Singles Chart.)	—	91	72	29	—	—	MC: 2× Platinum	Bad Habits
"Tap" (featuring Meek Mill)	2019	46	—	—	― (Note: "Tap" did not enter the NZ Top 40 Singles Chart, but peaked at number 33 on the NZ Hot Singles Chart.)	—	—	87	36	24	—	MC: 2× Platinum; RIAA: 2× Platinum	Bad Habits
"Turks" (with Gunna featuring Travis Scott)	2020	45	—	60	― (Note: "Turks" did not enter the NZ Top 40 Singles Chart, but peaked at number five on the NZ Hot Singles Chart.)	83	54	17	9	5	—	MC: Platinum; RIAA: 2× Platinum; RMNZ: Gold	Good Intentions
"Painless 2" (with J.I the Prince of N.Y featuring Lil Durk)	2020	—	—	—	—	—	—	—	—	—	—		Non-album single
"Young Wheezy" (with Gunna)	2021	51	—	—	― (Note: "Young Wheezy" did not enter the NZ Top 40 Singles Chart, but peaked at number 31 on the NZ Hot Singles Chart.)	—	—	84	34	—	133		Emergency Tsunami
"Burnt n Turnt" (with Lil Gotit)	2021	—	—	—	—	—	—	—	—	—	—		Top Chef Gotit
"Never Sleep" (with Lil Baby featuring Travis Scott)	2022	23	—	—	― (Note: "Never Sleep" did not enter the NZ Top 40 Singles Chart, but peaked at number seven on the NZ Hot Singles Chart.)	—	95	50	19	8	71	MC: Gold	Demons Protected by Angels
"Wrong Decisions"	2022	—	—	—	—	—	—	—	—	—			Demons Protected by Angels
"One Time" (with Don Toliver featuring Future)	2022	55	—	—	—	—	—	— (Note: "One Time" did not enter the Billboard Hot 100, but peaked at number five on the Bubbling Under Hot 100 chart.)	37	—	—		Demons Protected by Angels
"Fenty" (with French Montana)	2022	—	—	—	—	—	—	—	—	—	—		Coke Boys 6
"Double Faces" (with Money Musik and SoFaygo)	2023	—	—	—	—	—	—	—	—	—	—		Money Militia
"Lately"	2023	100	—	—	—	—	—	—	—	—	—		Non-album single
"Calling" (with Metro Boomin and Swae Lee featuring A Boogie wit da Hoodie)	2023	18	27	59	25	99	56	41	13	8	21	ARIA: Gold	Spider-Man: Across the Spider-Verse (Soundtrack from and Inspired by the Motion Picture)
"Baller"	2023	—	—	—	—	—	—	—	—	—	—		Non-album single
"Favorite Lady" (with Diany Dior featuring Cash Cobain)	2024	—	—	—	—	—	—	—	—	—	—		Big Dior
"Rexdale"	2024	—	—	—	—	—	—	—	—	—	—		Non-album singles [K]
"6AM Thoughts" (with Bay Swag featuring Cash Cobain)	2024	—	—	—	—	—	—	—	—	—	—		Non-album singles [K]
"Real Me" (with Metro Boomin)	2025	—	—	—	—	—	—	—	—	—	—		OMW2 Rexdale
"Daytona" (Remix) (with Karan Aujla and Ikky)	2025	—	—	—	—	—	—	—	—	—	—		Non-album single
"Trimski" (with Young Thug)	2026	—	—	—	—	—	—	—	—	—	—		Non-album single
"Mutt" (with Quavo)	2026	—	—	—	—	—	—	—	—	—	—		Non-album single
"Pop My Shit" (with Frost)	2026	—	—	—	—	—	—	—	—	—	—		Non-album single
"Woah" (with Young Thug)	2026	—	—	—	—	—	—	—	—	—	—		Non-album single
"—" denotes a recording that did not chart or was not released in that territory.													Non-album single

=== As featured artist ===
List of singles, showing year released and album name
Title	Year	Peak chart positions										Certifications	Album
Title	Year	CAN	AUS	FRA	GER	POR	SWE	UK	US	US R&B/HH	US Rap	Certifications	Album
"Jokers" (Harvey Stripes featuring Nav)	2015	—	—	—	—	—	—	—	—	—	—		Yours to Discover
"Beibs in the Trap" (Travis Scott featuring Nav)	2016	52	—	—	—	—	—	—	90	38	—	MC: 2× Platinum; ARIA: Platinum; BPI: Silver; RIAA: 4× Platinum	Birds in the Trap Sing McKnight
"Re Up" (Belly featuring Nav)	2017	—	—	—	—	—	—	—	—	—	—		Inzombia
"Bali" (88Glam featuring Nav)	2017	62	—	—	—	—	—	—	—	—	—	MC: Platinum	88Glam
"Phone" (Smokepurpp featuring Nav)	2017	—	—	—	—	—	—	—	—	—	—		Non-album single
"Maintain" (Belly featuring Nav)	2018	97	—	—	—	—	—	—	—	—	—		Immigrant
"Yosemite" (Travis Scott featuring Gunna and Nav)	2018	18	97	93	98	56	92	93	25	16	14	MC: 4× Platinum; ARIA: Platinum; SNEP: Gold; BPI: Gold; RIAA: 4× Platinum	Astroworld
"It's a Flex" (88Glam featuring Nav)	2019	—	—	—	—	—	—	—	—	—	—		88Glam2
"Shoebox" (Hoodrich Pablo Juan and Gucci Mane featuring Nav)	2019	—	—	—	—	—	—	—	—	—	—		BLO: The Movie
"Called It" (Trav featuring Nav)	2019	—	—	—	—	—	—	—	—	—	—		Non-album single
"Pradaaa Shoes" (Trav featuring Nav)	2020	—	—	—	—	—	—	—	—	—	—		Nothing Happens Overnight
"Lemonade" (Internet Money, Gunna, and Don Toliver featuring Nav)	2020	3	5	13	2	1	3	1	6	3	3	MC: 4× Platinum; ARIA: 3× Platinum; SNEP: Diamond; BVMI: Platinum; AFP: 3× Platinum; BPI: Platinum; RIAA: 4× Platinum; RMNZ: 4× Platinum	B4 the Storm
"Jesse Owens" (Rowdy Rebel featuring Nav)	2021	—	—	—	—	—	—	—	—	—	—		Non-album single
"Requiem" (Belly featuring Nav)	2021	—	—	—	—	—	—	—	—	—	—		See You Next Wednesday
"Do Not Disturb" (Vory featuring Nav and Yung Bleu)	2022	—	—	—	—	—	—	—	—	—	—		Lost Souls
"Looking at Me" (Elyrix featuring Nav)	2023	—	—	—	—	—	—	—	—	—	—		Non-album singles
"Fall Back" (Lithe featuring Nav)	2024	—	—	—	—	—	—	—	—	—	—		Non-album singles
"Clean Me Up" (Frost featuring Nav)	2026	—	—	—	—	—	—	—	—	—	—		
"—" denotes a recording that did not chart or was not released in that territory.

== Other charted and certified songs ==
List of songs, with selected chart positions and certifications, showing year charted and album name
Title	Year	Peak chart positions					Certifications	Album
Title	Year	CAN	NZ Hot	US	US R&B /HH	US Rap	Certifications	Album
"Good for It"	2017	–	–	–	—	—	MC: Gold	Nav
"Up"	2017	—	—	—	—	—	MC: Platinum; RIAA: Platinum	Nav
"ASAP Ferg" (with Metro Boomin featuring Lil Uzi Vert)	2017	88	—	—	—	—	MC: Gold	Perfect Timing
"Held Me Down" (with Metro Boomin)	2017	—	—	—	—	—	MC: Platinum	Perfect Timing
"Minute" (with Metro Boomin featuring Playboi Carti and Offset)	2017	76	—	— (Note: "Minute" did not enter the Billboard Hot 100, but peaked at number 21 on the Bubbling Under Hot 100 chart.)	— (Note: "Minute" did not enter the Billboard Hot R&B/Hip-Hop Songs chart, but peaked at number four on the Bubbling Under R&B/Hip-Hop Singles chart.)	—	MC: Platinum; RIAA: Platinum	Perfect Timing
"Dance for Me" (Tory Lanez featuring Nav)	2018	61	—	—	—	—		Memories Don't Die
"Faith" (featuring Quavo)	2018	72	—	—	—	—	MC: Gold	Reckless
"Pull Up" (A Boogie wit da Hoodie featuring Nav)	2018	—	—	—	—	—	RIAA: Gold	Hoodie SZN and International Artist
"Off White Vlone" (Lil Baby and Gunna featuring Lil Durk and Nav)	2018	52	—	54	25	23	MC: Gold; RIAA: Gold	Drip Harder
"To My Grave"	2019	78	—	—	—	—		Bad Habits
"Hold Your Breath" (featuring Gunna)	2019	85	—	—	—	—		Bad Habits
"Baguettes in the Face" (Mustard featuring Nav, Playboi Carti, and A Boogie wit da Hoodie)	2019	47	18	81	33	—	RIAA: Platinum; RMNZ: Platinum	Perfect Ten
"Leaders" (Lil Uzi Vert featuring Nav)	2020	72	18	72	39	—		Lil Uzi Vert vs. the World 2
"No Debate" (featuring Young Thug)	2020	65	33	— (Note: "No Debate" did not enter the Billboard Hot 100, but peaked at number 20 on the Bubbling Under Hot 100 chart.)	—	—		Good Intentions
"My Business" (featuring Future)	2020	85	—	— (Note: "My Business" did not enter the Billboard Hot 100, but peaked at number 23 on the Bubbling Under Hot 100 chart.)	—	—		Good Intentions
"Status" (featuring Lil Uzi Vert)	2020	69	—	— (Note: "Status" did not enter the Billboard Hot 100, but peaked at number one on the Bubbling Under Hot 100 chart.)	47	—		Good Intentions
"Codeine" (featuring Gunna)	2020	86	30	— (Note: "Codeine" did not enter the Billboard Hot 100, but peaked at number 12 on the Bubbling Under Hot 100 chart.)	—	—		Good Intentions
"Saint Laurenttt"	2020	72	—	—	—	—		Good Intentions
"Run It Up" (featuring Pop Smoke)	2020	64	29	— (Note: "Run It Up" did not enter the Billboard Hot 100, but peaked at number 19 on the Bubbling Under Hot 100 chart.)	—	—	MC: Gold	Good Intentions
"Recap" (featuring Don Toliver)	2020	76	26	—	—	—	MC: Gold	Good Intentions
"Friends & Family"	2020	50	—	— (Note: "Friends & Family" did not enter the Billboard Hot 100, but peaked at number nine on the Bubbling Under Hot 100 chart.)	—	—	MC: Gold	Emergency Tsunami
"Don't Need Friends" (featuring Lil Baby)	2020	46	33	65	21	20	MC: Gold	Emergency Tsunami
"Kukoč" (AJ Tracey featuring Nav)	2021	—	25	—	—	—		Flu Game
"Dead Shot" (with Lil Uzi Vert)	2022	75	—	— (Note: "Dead Shot" did not enter the Billboard Hot 100, but peaked at number seven on the Bubbling Under Hot 100 chart.)	39	—		Demons Protected by Angels
"Playa" (with Gunna)	2022	—	—	— (Note: "Playa" did not enter the Billboard Hot 100, but peaked at number 23 on the Bubbling Under Hot 100 chart.)	49	—		Demons Protected by Angels
"Unlimited" (featuring Playboi Carti)	2025	—	26	—	—	—		OMW2 Rexdale
"—" denotes a recording that did not chart in that territory.

== Guest appearances ==
List of non-single guest appearances, with other performing artists, showing year released and album name
Title	Year	Other artist(s)	Album
"What Do You Do"	2017	ASAP Ferg	Still Striving
"Car Sick"	2018	Gunna, Metro Boomin	Drip Season 3
"Dance for Me"	2018	Tory Lanez	Memories Don't Die
"Pull Up"	2018	A Boogie wit da Hoodie	Hoodie SZN and International Artist
"Off White Vlone"	2018	Lil Baby, Gunna, Lil Durk	Drip Harder
"Cut Me Off"	2018	Tory Lanez	Love Me Now?
"Seven Days A Week"	2018	Young Scooter	The Recipe
"Wrong Thing"	2019	Rich the Kid	The World Is Yours 2
"Snow Globe (Remix)"	2019	88Glam	88Glam2.5
"Rockstar"	2019	Lil Keed	Long Live Mexico
"Baguettes in the Face"	2019	Mustard, Playboi Carti, A Boogie wit da Hoodie	Perfect Ten
"Enemies"	2019	Yung Bans, Lil Durk	Misunderstood
"Boy Back"	2019	Young Thug	So Much Fun
"Swerve"	2019	Headie One, Stefflon Don	Music x Road
"Mazel Tov"	2019	Strick	The Machine, Vol. 2
"Wolves"	2020	Pop Smoke	Meet the Woo 2 (Deluxe)
"Leaders"	2020	Lil Uzi Vert	Lil Uzi Vert vs. the World 2
"Nothing 4 Free"	2020	Gunna	Wunna (Deluxe)
"Foreign"	2020	Lil Tecca	Virgo World
"Kukoč"	2021	AJ Tracey	Flu Game
"Pots n Pans"	2021	YSL Records, Lil Duke	Slime Language 2 + (Deluxe)
"Mil in Vegas"	2021	YSL Records, Young Thug	Slime Language 2 + (Deluxe)
"Collages"	2021	Lil Gotit, Millie Go Lightly	Top Chef Gotit
"About You"	2021	Lil Tecca	We Love You Tecca 2
"Don't Wanna Leave"	2021	Strick	Strick Land
"Geeked Up"	2022	T-Shyne, YSL Records	Confetti Nights
"Clingy"	2022	Coi Leray	Trendsetter
"Muso Kuso"	2023	Lil Keed	Keed Talk to 'Em 2
"Just Like Me"	2023	Belly	Mumble Rap 2
"Money Machine"	2025	Money Musik	Money Militia
"True Colors"	2025	Money Musik	Money Militia
"Power of a Dollar Interlude"	2025	NorthSideBenji, Money Musik	Misery Loves Company
"Met Me Balling"	2026	King Hendricks	Mob America 2
"No Call No Show"	2026	Swae Lee	Same Difference
"Chosen Ones"	2026	Gurinder Gill, Manu	Can't Stop Now

== Production discography ==
=== 2015 ===
Drake

- "Back to Back" (produced with Drake, 40 and Daxz)

=== 2016 ===
Travis Scott – Birds in the Trap Sing McKnight

- 5. "Beibs in the Trap" (featuring Nav)

Belly – Inzombia

- 5. "Re Up" (featuring Nav)

=== 2017 ===
Nav – Nav

- 1. "Myself"
- 2. "Nav" (produced with DannyBoyStyles)
- 3. "My Mind"
- 4. "Good for It"
- 5. "Lonely" (produced with Rex Kudo)
- 6. "Up" (produced with Metro Boomin)
- 7. "Interlude"
- 8. "Sleep"
- 9. "Mariah" (produced with Rex Kudo)
- 10. "Some Way" (featuring the Weeknd)
- 11. "TTD"

Kodak Black – Painting Pictures

- 8. "Save You" (produced with Ben Billions)

Nav and Metro Boomin – Perfect Timing

- 4. "ASAP Ferg" (featuring Lil Uzi Vert) (produced with Metro Boomin)
- 5. "Held Me Down" (produced with Metro Boomin and Cubeatz)
- 6. "Minute" (featuring Playboi Carti and Offset) (produced with Metro Boomin and Pi'erre Bourne)
- 12. "Rich" (produced with Metro Boomin)
- 14. "I Am" (produced with Metro Boomin and DannyBoyStyles)
- 15. "NavUziMetro#Pt2" (featuring Lil Uzi Vert) (produced with Metro Boomin and Trouble Trouble)

A Boogie wit da Hoodie – The Bigger Artist

- 8. "Get to You" (produced with Metro Boomin and Southside)

Gucci Mane – Mr. Davis

- 6. "Curve" (featuring the Weeknd) (produced with Frost)

=== 2018 ===
Gunna – Drip Season 3

- 8. "Car Sick" (featuring Nav and Metro Boomin) (produced with Metro Boomin)

Nav – Reckless

- 1. "Reckless" (produced with DannyBoyStyles)
- 2. "Never Change" (produced with DannyBoyStyles)
- 4. "Faith" (featuring Quavo) (produced with Trouble Trouble)
- 6. "Glow Up" (produced with DannyBoyStyles)
- 7. "Just Happened" (produced with DannyBoyStyles and Bobby Raps)
- 9. "With Me" (produced with Ben Billions)

Belly – Immigrant

- 8. "What You Want" (featuring the Weeknd) (produced with the ANMLS and Cirkut)

The Carters – Everything Is Love

- 6. "Friends" (produced with Beyoncé, Jay-Z, Boi-1da, Jahaan Sweet, Sevn Thomas, and Fred Ball)

=== 2019 ===
Nav – Bad Habits

- 3. "Taking Chances" (produced with Trouble Trouble and Money Musik)
- 5. "Tension" (produced with Trouble Trouble, Money Musik, Frost and DaHeala)
- 7. "Ralo" (produced with Trouble Trouble, Money Musik and Frost)
- 8. "Tussin" (featuring Young Thug) (produced with ATL Jacob, Money Musik and Rasta Papii)
- 9. "Snap" (produced with Trouble Trouble and Money Musik)
- 11. "Why You Crying Mama" (produced with Trouble Trouble, Money Musik and Frost)
- 12. "Time Piece" (featuring Lil Durk) (produced with Trouble Trouble and Money Musik)
- 13. "Dior Runners" (produced with DannyBoyStyles, Trouble Trouble and Money Musik)
- 14. "Vicodin" (produced with Trouble Trouble, Money Musik, Frost and DannyBoyStyles)
- 15. "Stuck with Me" produced with Trouble Trouble, Money Musik and DannyBoyStyles)

Deluxe bonus tracks

- 22. "Never Know" (produced with Trouble Trouble and Money Musik)
- 24. "Athlete" (produced with DannyBoyStyles, Trouble Trouble, Money Musik and Frost)

=== 2020 ===
Lil Uzi Vert - Lil Uzi Vert vs. the World 2

- 14. "Leaders" (featuring Nav) (produced with Cash, Money Musik and Pro Logic)

Nav - Good Intentions

- 1. "Good Intentions (Intro)" (produced with Pro Logic, Wallis Lane, and LoMastro)
- 2. "No Debate" (featuring Young Thug) (produced with Cash, Wheezy, Pro Logic, and Money Musik)
- 6. "Status" (featuring Lil Uzi Vert) (produced with Cash, Pro Logic, and Keanu Beats)
- 7. "Codeine" (featuring Gunna) (produced with Pro Logic)

Nav - Brown Boy 2 (Good Intentions deluxe edition)

- 7. "Heat"

=== 2021 ===
Belly – See You Next Wednesday

- 9. "Requiem" (featuring Nav) (produced with DaHeala)

=== 2022 ===
Nav – Demons Protected by Angels

- 1. "Count on Me (Intro)" (produced with Rex Kudo, Aaron Paris, Carlton McDowell, Reece, and Mike Dean)
- 2. "Baby" (produced with Boi-1da, Money Musik, Millaire, Darko, Smplgtwy, and Zubnid)
- 5. "Last of the Mohicans" (produced with Money Musik and Oscar Zulu)
- 10. "My Dawg" (with Lil Durk) (produced with Pro Logic, Keanu Beats, and Fabio Aguilar)
- 9. "Don't Compare" (produced with Carlton McDowell)
- 12. "Interstellar" (with Lil Uzi Vert) (produced with Pro Logic, Patrick Piscot, and Jeppe Jacobsen)
- 13. "Loaded" (produced with Money Musik, London Cyr, and Yeeshy)
- 14. "Lost Me" (with RealestK) (produced with Money Musik, Honeywoods, and Bodi)
- 15. "Reset" (with Bryson Tiller) (produced with Cash and Pro Logic)
- 17. "Wrong Decisions"
- 19. "Ball in Peace (Outro)" (produced with Mike Dean)

=== 2023 ===
Nav

- "Lately"

=== 2024 ===
Nav

- "Rexdale" (produced with PresPlay)

=== 2025 ===
Nav – OMW2 Rexdale

- 1. "Sinking" (produced with Carlton and Rance)
- 2. "You" (featuring Don Toliver) (produced with PresPlay)
- 3. "Stay Up" (produced with Synthetic and LRBG)
- 4. "Burbs" (produced with Wheezy)
- 6. "Back 2 Business" (produced with Oz and Pro Logic)
- 7. "U.N.I." (produced with Dre Moon and Chris Xz)
- 8. "One of None" (produced with PresPlay)
- 9. "Nxxd You" (produced with Rodrigo Barahona and Allen Ritter)
- 10. "Real Me" (with Metro Boomin) (produced with Metro Boomin, David x Eli, and Eren Yüksel)
- 11. "Red" (produced with Allen Ritter, Late Night Ricky, and Rodrigo Barahona)
- 12. "Keep Going" (produced with PresPlay, Rodrigo Barahona, and Frost)
- 13. "Get 2 U" (produced with Pro Logic)
- 14. "Pain Away" (produced with Dre Moon, Chris Xz, Mike Dean, and Peter Lee Johnson)

Deluxe bonus tracks

- 15. "Get U Back"
- 16. "Number 1 Fan"
- 17. "Globe"
- 18. "Potholes" (produced with PresPlay)
- 19. "Lift Service" (produced with Rodrigo Barahona)
- 20. "Red Eye" (produced with Frost, Arjun Singha, and Mason Wu)
- 21. "Feel None" (produced with Money Musik)
- 22. "Rexdale" (extended version) (produced with PresPlay and Rodrigo Barahona)

Digital "Whiteboard" bonus tracks

- 23. "Now It's Over" (produced with Wheezy and Rex Kudo)
- 27. "Highway" (produced with Rex Kudo)
- 29. "Paranoid" (produced with Rex Kudo)
- 30. "Fast Life" (produced with Carlton and Rex Kudo)
- 31. "Take a Seat" (produced with Rex Kudo)
- 32. "Beside Me" (produced with TM88 and Rex Kudo)
- 33. "Bum" (produced with Wheezy and Rex Kudo)
- 34. "Doubled Up" (produced with Rex Kudo)
- 35. "Mission"
- 36. "She Know"
