= Brown Boy =

Brown Boy may refer to:

== People and characters ==
- A boy with Brown (surname)
- A male with brown skin
  - A South Asian male
  - A Southeast Asian male
  - A Latino, a person of the Latin Americans

=== Persons ===
- Nav (rapper) (born 1999 as Navraj Singh Goraya), Canadian rapper also known as "Brown Boy"
- Brown Boy, a musician signed to Thump Records

=== Fictional characters ===
- Brown Boy, a character from the ballet Dances at a Gathering

== Music ==
- Brown Boys, a band founded by Byg Byrd

=== Songs ===
- "Brown Boy", a 1950 song by Al Sears and the Sparrows
- "Brown Boy", a 1967 composition by John Bassette
- "Brown Boy", a 2020 song by Nav off the album Good Intentions
- "Brown Boy", a 2012 song by Tunde Olaniran off the 2012 EP The Second Transgression

=== EPs ===
- Brown Boy (EP), a 2019 EP by Nav, a preview record for the 2019 album Bad Habits

== Other uses ==
- The Brown Boy, a 1764 painting by Joshua Reynolds
- Brown Boy Records, a record company founded by Byg Byrd
- Brown Boy Productions, a production company founded by Leon Lopez
- Brown Boy Bottling Co., owned by Jesse B. Blayton

== See also ==
- Brown Boy 1, a record by Nav
- Brown Boy 2, a record by Nav
- Pancho Villa (boxer) (1901–1925), Filipino boxer nicknamed "Little Brown Boy"
- Little Brown Boy, a 2003 short film by Barry Jenkins
- "Little Brown Boy", a 1933 artwork by Samuel A. Countee
- "Little Brown Boy", a 1968 song by The Impressions off the album We're a Winner
- "O Menino Desce O Morro (Little Brown Boy)", a 1962 song; see Bossa Nova (Shorty Rogers album) and Bossa Nova: New Brazilian Jazz
- Little brown brother, U.S. slang for Filipinos
- All page titles containing "brown" and "boy"
- Brown (disambiguation)
- Boy (disambiguation)
