= Price on My Head =

Single by Nav featuring the Weeknd

from the album Bad Habits
- Released: March 26, 2019
- Length: 3:38
- Label: XO; Republic
- Songwriters: Navraj Goraya; Abel Tesfaye; Ahmad Balshe; Derek Bissue; Bradley Geisler
- Producers: Derek Wise; AlexOnWeed

Nav singles chronology
"Shoebox" (2019)	"Price on My Head" (2019)	"Tap" (2019)

The Weeknd singles chronology
"Lost in the Fire" (2019)	"Price on My Head" / "Wake Up" (2019)	"Power Is Power" (2019)

Music video
- "Price on My Head" on YouTube

"Price on My Head" is a song by Canadian rapper Nav, featuring vocals from Canadian singer the Weeknd. The song was released through XO Records and Republic Records as the second single from Nav's second studio album, Bad Habits, on March 26, 2019. The song marks Nav and the Weeknd's second collaboration since Nav's single, "Some Way" from his self-titled mixtape (2017). The song was produced by Derek Wise from Canadian hip hop duo 88Glam and AlexOnWeed.

== Lyrics ==
The song features lyrics about being envied for one's "fame and wealth".

== Music video ==
A music video for the track directed by Kid. Studio was released on March 26, 2019. It is set in Toronto, the hometown of both Nav and the Weeknd, and was described as "apocalyptic" and "intense".

== Charts ==
Chart (2019)	Peak position
Canada Hot 100 (Billboard)	18
New Zealand Hot Singles (RMNZ)	12
UK Singles (Official Charts)	91
US Billboard Hot 100	72
US Hot R&B/Hip-Hop Songs (Billboard)	29

== Certifications ==
Region	Certification	Certified units/sales
Canada (Music Canada)	2× Platinum	160,000^{‡}
^{‡} Sales+streaming figures based on certification alone.
