= Bali (song) =

2017 single by 88Glam featuring Nav

Single by 88Glam featuring Nav

from the album 88Glam
- Released: November 7, 2017
- Length: 3:05
- Label: Self-released
- Songwriter(s): Derek Bissue; Shakqueel Burthwright; Navraj Goraya; Bradley Geisler; Aaron Watkins
- Producer(s): AlexOnWeed; Villa Beatz

88Glam singles chronology
"12" (2017)	"Bali" (2017)	"Big Tymers" (2017)

Nav singles chronology
"Perfect Timing (Intro)" / "Call Me" (2017)	"Bali" (2017)	"Wanted You" (2017)

Music video
- "Bali" on YouTube

"Bali" is a song by Canadian hip hop duo 88Glam, featuring vocals from Canadian rapper Nav. It was released independently by 88Glam as the second single from their self-titled debut mixtape on November 7, 2017, along with the mixtape. The two 88Glam members, Derek Wise and 88Camino, and Nav wrote the song with producers AlexOnWeed and Villa Beatz. The remix of the song also adds a feature from American rapper 2 Chainz and was released as part of the reloaded version of the mixtape on April 20, 2018. The song reached number 62 on the Canadian Hot 100 and was certified platinum by Music Canada.

== Composition and lyrics ==
"Bali" sees Derek Wise rap the first verse, 88Camino rap the chorus and second verse, and Nav rap the third verse as they brag about their fame and riches. It includes trap production and sees Nav taking shots at his haters in his verse: "I just ordered two more, now I got three different watches / See my haters talkin', make sure that they watchin' / Real bosses listen, talkin' money when I'm talkin' / Outline you in chalk, Raf or Ricky, when I walk in / Wylin' like I'm Stone Cold Steve, I fucked a bitch in Austin".

== Music video ==
The official music video for "Bali", directed by Nav's manager and 88Glam's at-the-time soon-to-be manager, Cash, was released alongside the song and mixtape on November 7, 2017. It sees Derek Wise, 88Camino, and Nav standing in front of expensive cars and partying in a nightclub with friends.

== Charts ==
Chart performance for "Bali"
Chart (2017)	Peak position
Canada (Canadian Hot 100)	62

== Certifications ==
Certifications for "Bali"
Region	Certification	Certified units/sales
Canada (Music Canada)	Platinum	80,000^{‡}
^{‡} Sales+streaming figures based on certification alone.
