= OMW2 Rexdale =

Studio album by Nav
- Released: March 28, 2025
- Length: 56:01
- Labels: XO; Republic
- Producers: Nav; Allen Ritter; Carlton; Chris Xz; Dre Moon; Frost; Late Night Ricky; Metro Boomin; Money Musik; Oz; PresPlay; Pro Logic; Rodrigo Barahona; Ojivolta; Synthetic; Twisco; Wheezy

Nav chronology
Demons Protected by Angels (2022)	OMW2 Rexdale (2025)

Singles from OMW2 Rexdale
- 1. "Real Me" Released: March 21, 2025

OMW2 Rexdale (an abbreviation of On My Way 2 Rexdale) is the fifth studio album by Canadian rapper Nav. It was released through XO and Republic Records on March 28, 2025. The album features guest appearances from Don Toliver, Playboi Carti, and Metro Boomin. Production was handled by Nav and Metro Boomin themselves, alongside Rance, Wheezy, Ojivolta, Oz, Dre Moon, Allen Ritter, and Mike Dean, among others. The deluxe edition of the album was exclusively released on Nav's website before being released to streaming services on May 2, while the "Whiteboard" edition of the album was exclusively released on his website with a limited amount of time to purchase it. Named after his hometown of Rexdale in Toronto, Canada, OMW2 Rexdale serves as the follow-up to his previous album, Demons Protected by Angels (2022). The album was supported by the lead and only single, "Real Me", a collaboration with Metro Boomin, which was released exactly a week before its release.

Professional ratings
Review scores
Source	Rating
AllMusic	2/5 stars

== Background and promotion ==
On October 1, 2022, Nav took to Twitter to announce the title of the album, which was called Nav2 at the time and would have been his third commercial mixtape, as well as the sequel to his 2017 self-titled debut commercial mixtape. On February 10, 2023, he released the self-produced single "Lately", which was originally going to serve as the lead single from the project, to kick off his next musical era. For the rest of the year, Nav stayed relatively quiet on social media and posted a few snippets of songs that might possibly appear on the project, although he released a few songs and was featured on a few.

In April 2024, Nav performed twice at the Coachella festival in Indio, California, on April 14 and April 21, where he announced the title OMW2 Rexdale at the end of his performance on the former date although it was unclear whether it was a single or a project and performed the then-unreleased song from the album titled "Red" on the latter date. On May 14, he released a trailer video for the album, where he confirmed the title of the album and announced that it would be released in the middle of that year, while also hinting at American rappers Future, Young Thug, Travis Scott, Don Toliver, Playboi Carti, and American record producer Metro Boomin being some of the potential guest appearances on the album, although the former three did not appear on it. Exactly two weeks later, while performing at PFL 10 in Riyadh, Saudi Arabia before the event started, Nav announced that it would be released the following year. After releasing a few singles and being featured on one, stayed relatively quiet on social media for the rest of the year. On March 18, 2025, Nav announced the release date of the album along with a final trailer video, followed by its cover art being revealed the following date. The lead single, "Real Me", a collaboration with Metro Boomin, was released on March 21.

== Commercial performance and controversy ==
OMW2 Rexdale debuted at number 37 on the Billboard 200 with 18,000 album-equivalent units, marking Nav's least commercially-successful studio album. It was originally set to debut at number three on the charts by having 83,000 album-equivalent units with 71,000 pure sales, but it was reported Billboard took tens of thousands of sales off last minute due to alleged fraudulent sales.

== Track listing ==
OMW2 Rexdale track listing
No.	Title	Writer(s)	Producer(s)	Length
1.	"Sinking"	Navraj Goraya; Carlton McDowell; Larrance Dopson	Nav; McDowell; Rance^{[a]}	2:05
2.	"You" (featuring Don Toliver)	Goraya; Caleb Toliver; Ariel Lopez	Nav; PresPlay	3:04
3.	"Stay Up"	Goraya; Ronald Coleman; Javier Mercado; Gabriel St-Onge	Nav; Synthetic; LRBG	1:58
4.	"Burbs"	Goraya; Wesley Glass	Nav; Wheezy	1:54
5.	"Unlimited" (featuring Playboi Carti)	Goraya; Jordan Carter; Abel Tesfaye; Mark Williams; Raul Cubina; Jarrod Morgan	Ojivolta; Twisco^{[b]}	3:28
6.	"Back 2 Business"	Goraya; Ozan Yıldirim; Andrew Franklin	Nav; Oz; Pro Logic; Allen Ritter^{[b]}	2:22
7.	"U.N.I."	Goraya; Andre Proctor; Christopher Townsend	Nav; Dre Moon; Chris XZ; Peter Lee Johnson^{[b]}	2:12
8.	"One of None"	Goraya; Lopez	Nav; PresPlay	2:38
9.	"Nxxd You"	Goraya; Franklin; Rodrigo Barahona	Nav; Barahona; Ritter^{[b]}	3:19
10.	"Real Me" (with Metro Boomin)	Goraya; Leland Wayne; David Ruoff; Elias Klughammer; Eren Yüksel	Nav; Metro Boomin; David x Eli^{[a]}; Yüksel^{[a]}	3:07
11.	"Red"	Goraya; Ritter; Naveen Pabbi; Barahona	Nav; Ritter; Late Night Ricky; Barahona^{[a]}	2:13
12.	"Keep Going"	Goraya; Lopez; Barahona; Sugar-Ray Henry	PresPlay; Barahona; Frost	2:16
13.	"Get 2 U"	Goraya; Franklin	Nav; Pro Logic	3:01
14.	"Pain Away"	Goraya; Proctor; Townsend; Mike Dean	Nav; Dre Moon; Chris XZ; Dean^{[a]}; Johnson^{[b]}	2:57
Total length:				36:42

Deluxe edition bonus tracks
No.	Title	Writer(s)	Producer(s)	Length
15.	"Get U Back"	Goraya	Nav	3:07
16.	"Number 1 Fan"	Goraya	Nav	2:42
17.	"Globe"	Goraya	Nav	1:29
18.	"Potholes"	Goraya; Lopez	Nav; PresPlay	2:08
19.	"Lift Service"	Goraya; Barahona	Nav; Barahona	2:18
20.	"Red Eye"	Goraya; Henry	Nav; Frost	2:22
21.	"Feel None"	Goraya; Mohkom Bhangal	Nav; Money Musik	1:44
22.	"Rexdale" (extended version)	Goraya; Lopez; Barahona	Nav; PresPlay; Barahona	3:26
Total length:				56:01

=== Notes ===
- ^{^[a]} signifies a co-producer
- ^{^[b]} signifies an additional producer
- "Unlimited" features additional vocals from the Weeknd

== Personnel ==
Credits adapted from Tidal.

- Nav – vocals
- Ethan Stevens – mixing (1–14, 19, 22)
- Joe LaPorta – mastering
- Rodrigo Barahona – mixing (15–18), engineering (1–14, 22)
- Shin Kamiyama – engineering (1)
- Victor Luevanos – additional mixing (2–9, 11–14)

== Charts ==
Chart performance for OMW2 Rexdale
Chart (2025)	Peak position
Canadian Albums (Billboard)	34
US Billboard 200	37
US Top R&B/Hip-Hop Albums (Billboard)	14
