= 88Glam2 =

Studio album by 88Glam
- Released: November 16, 2018
- Length: 41:25
- Labels: XO; Republic
- Producers: 88Camino; AAA Gray; AlexOnWeed; Cubeatz; Derek Wise; Dez Wright; Frost; Joseph L'étranger; Maaly Raw; Money Musik; Noel Zancanella; Pro Logic; Rex Kudo; Russ Chell; Sevn Thomas; Take a Daytrip; Trouble Trouble; Villa Beatz; Yung Shrimp Tempura

88Glam chronology
88Glam (2017)	88Glam2 (2018)	New Mania (2020)

Singles from 88Glam2
- 1. "Lil Boat" Released: November 9, 2018; 2. "Kitchen Witch" Released: November 16, 2018; 3. "It's a Flex" Released: January 24, 2019

88Glam2 is the debut studio album by Canadian hip hop duo 88Glam. It was released through XO Records and Republic Records on November 16, 2018. The album features guest appearances from Nav and Gunna. Production was handled by 88Glam duo members Derek Wise and 88Camino themselves, as well as Villa Beatz, AlexOnWeed, Yung Shrimp Tempura, AAA Gray, Joseph L'étranger, Take a Daytrip, Russ Chell, Money Musik, Trouble Trouble, Frost, Rex Kudo, Sevn Thomas, Maaly Raw, Pro Logic, Dez Wright, Cubeatz, and Zancanella. The album was re-released under the name 88Glam2.5 on April 5, 2019. It contains two additional remixes of the songs "Snow Globe" and "Lil Boat", which add features from Nav and Lil Yachty, respectively. The album serves as 88Glam's last release under XO and Republic as they were dropped from both labels in early 2020.

== Background ==
About two weeks after the release of the album, 88Glam sat down for an interview with Billboard. Both members of the duo commentated their opinions on the project.

88Camino said:

I think I am most excited about being able to take the new music on the road. We have been performing our first project for the past year. That is such a big part of our act, right? Still, the music is only a small portion of what people connect to us as an act. So with the new music, we can almost embody it. We will be able to present the fully developed idea of what the project is supposed to represent when we perform it live.

Derek Wise said:

For me, it is this feeling of getting off all of the creative content that we have for our fans. I know they have been waiting for it. We have not dropped a project of music in a little while. Again, there is just this feeling of giving fans what they want. It means the world.

The album was supported by one single: "Lil Boat", which was released on November 9, 2018. It was remixed to include a feature from Lil Yachty, in which the song is named after a popular nickname of his, which was released on March 8, 2019. The second single, "Kitchen Witch", was released alongside the album on November 16, 2018. The third and final single, "It's a Flex", which features Canadian rapper Nav, the duo's now-former labelmate from XO, was released on January 24, 2019.

== Track listing ==
88Glam – Standard edition
No.	Title	Writer(s)	Producer(s)	Length
1.	"Purple Baguettes"	Derek Bissue; Shakqueel Burthwright; Aaron Watkins; Alexander Geisler; Quincy Nanatakyi; AAA Gray	Villa Beatz; AlexOnWeed^{[a]}; Yung Shrimp Tempura^{[a]}; AAA Gray^{[a]}	2:48
2.	"Blue Faces"	Bissue; Burthwright; Jeremy McIntyre	Joseph L'étranger	2:49
3.	"Lil Boat"	Bissue; Burthwright; David Biral; Denzel Baptiste; Russell Chell	Take a Daytrip; Russ Chell^{[a]}	3:00
4.	"Big Ship"	Bissue; Burthwright; Mohkom Bhangal; Jordan Bacchus; Sugar-Ray Henry	Money Musik; Trouble Trouble; Frost	2:20
5.	"Wet Dreams"	Bissue; Burthwright; Masamune Kudo; Rupert Thomas, Jr.	Rex Kudo; Sevn Thomas	2:36
6.	"It's a Flex" (featuring Nav)	Bissue; Burthwright; Navraj Goraya; Bhangal; Bacchus; S. Henry	Money Musik; Trouble Trouble; Frost	3:18
7.	"Talk Nice"	Bissue; Burthwright; Kudo; Thomas; Jamaal Henry	Rex Kudo; Sevn Thomas; Maaly Raw	3:59
8.	"Drop Top"	Bissue; Burthwright; Andrew Franklin; Dylan Cleary-Krell	Pro Logic; Dez Wright	3:00
9.	"Kawasaki"	Bissue; Burthwright; McIntyre	Joseph L'étranger	2:42
10.	"Racks" (featuring Gunna)	Bissue; Burthwright; Sergio Kitchens; J. Henry; Tim Gomringer; Kevin Gomringer	Maaly Raw; Cubeatz^{[a]}	3:28
11.	"Kitchen Witch"	Bissue; Burthwright; Geisler; McIntyre	Derek Wise; AlexOnWeed; Joseph L'étranger^{[a]}	3:00
12.	"Snow Globe"	Bissue; Burthwright; Bhangal; Bacchus; S. Henry	Money Musik; Trouble Trouble; Frost	2:51
13.	"GPS"	Bissue; Burthwright; Geisler; Watkins; Nanatakyi	AlexOnWeed; Derek Wise^{[b]}; 88Camino^{[b]}; Villa Beatz^{[b]}; Yung Shrimp Tempura^{[b]}	2:35
14.	"Endz"	Bissue; Burthwright; Biral; Baptiste; Noel Zancanella; Wyatt Sanders	Take a Daytrip; Zancanella^{[a]}	2:59
Total length:				41:25

88Glam2.5 – Reissue deluxe edition (bonus tracks)
No.	Title	Writer(s)	Producer(s)	Length
15.	"Snow Globe (Remix)" (featuring Nav)	Bissue; Burthwright; Goraya; Bhangal; Bacchus; S. Henry	Money Musik; Trouble Trouble; Frost	3:57
16.	"Lil Boat (Remix)" (featuring Lil Yachty)	Bissue; Burthwright; Miles McCollum; Biral; Baptiste; Chell	Take a Daytrip; Chell^{[a]}	4:04
Total length:				49:37

Notes

- ^{^[a]} signifies a co-producer.
- ^{^[b]} signifies an additional producer.

== Personnel ==
- Mixx – mixing (tracks 1, 2, 4–13, 15), studio personnel (tracks 1, 2, 4–13, 15)
- Villa Beatz – programming (track 1)
- Joseph L'étranger – programming (tracks 2, 9)
- Jacob Richards – mixing assistant (tracks 3, 13, 16)
- Mike Seaberg – mixing assistant (tracks 3, 13, 16)
- Rashawn Mclean – mixing assistant (tracks 3, 13, 16)
- Take a Daytrip
  - David Biral – drum programming (tracks 3, 16), engineering (tracks 3, 16), mixing (track 14), studio personnel (tracks 3, 14, 16)
  - Denzel Baptiste – drum programming (tracks 3, 16), mixing (track 14), studio personnel (track 14)
- Russ Chell – guitar loops (tracks 3, 16)
- Jaycen Joshua – mixing (tracks 3, 13, 16)
- Money Musik – programming (tracks 4, 6, 12, 15)
- Trouble Trouble – programming (tracks 4, 6, 12, 15)
- Frost – programming (tracks 4, 6, 12, 15)
- Rex Kudo – programming (tracks 5, 7), engineering (track 5), studio personnel (track 5)
- Sevn Thomas – programming (track 5)
- Maaly Raw – programming (track 7)
- Pro Logic – programming (track 8)
- Dez Wright – programming (track 8)
- Derek Wise – programming (track 11)
- AlexOnWeed – programming (track 11)
- Gordon Goggs – mixing (track 16), studio personnel (track 16)

== Charts ==
Chart performance for 88Glam2
Chart (2018)	Peak position
Canadian Albums (Billboard)	33
