= Nav (rapper) =

Canadian rapper and record producer (born 1989)

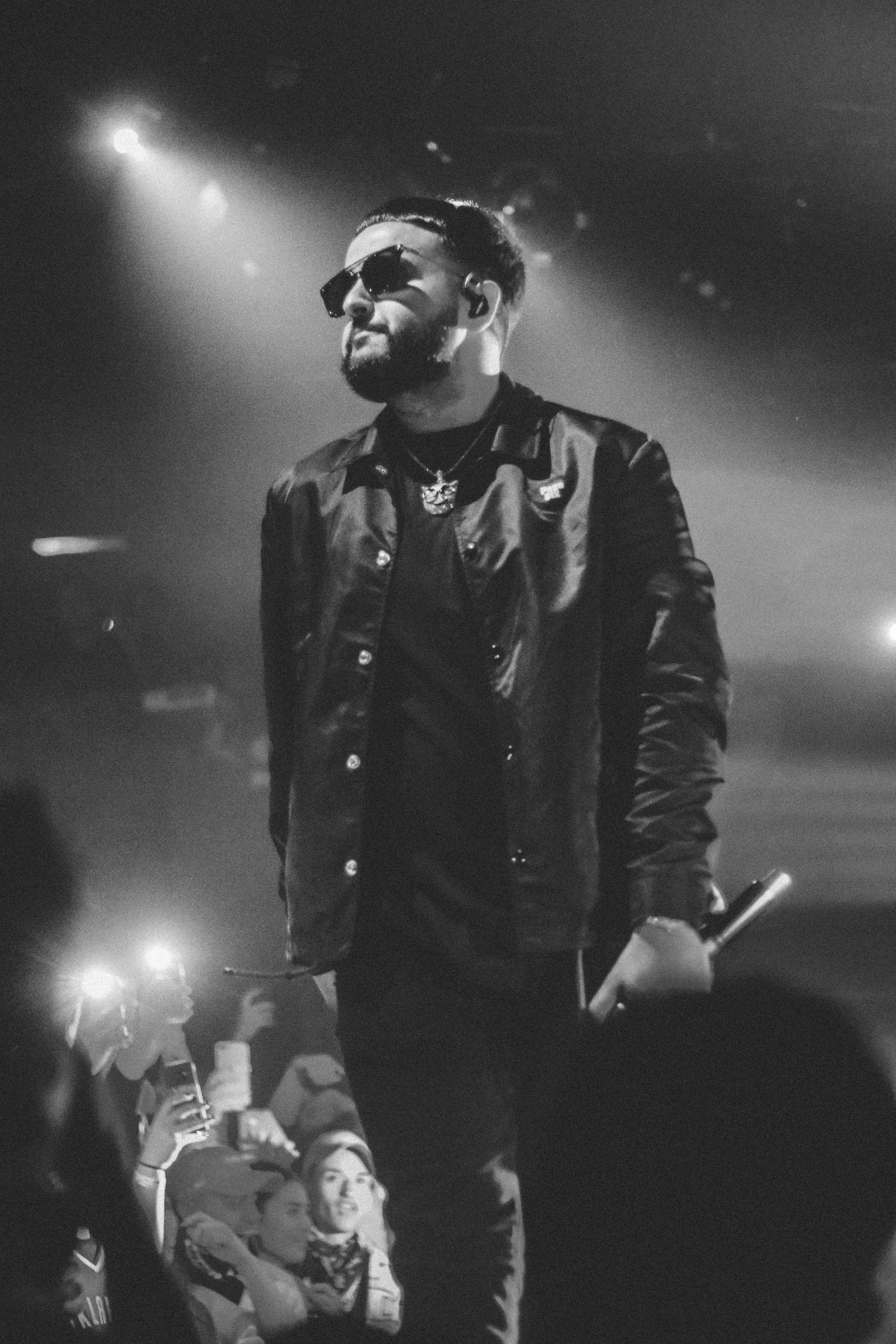
- Nav in 2018

Background information
- Also known as: Brown Boy
- Born: Navraj Singh Goraya; November 3, 1989 (age 37); Toronto, Ontario, Canada
- Genres: Hip-hop; cloud rap; trap
- Occupations: Rapper; singer; songwriter; record producer
- Works: Recording; production
- Years active: 2015–present
- Labels: XO; Republic
- Management: Amir "Cash" Esmailian; Wassim "Sal" Slaiby
- Website: navmusic.com

Navraj "Nav" Singh Goraya (born November 3, 1989) is a Canadian rapper, singer, songwriter, and record producer. He began his career as a producer for other artists before embarking on his recording career, with his first major production credit being Drake's 2015 single "Back to Back". In early 2017, Nav signed with fellow Canadian singer the Weeknd's record label, XO.

Nav's second and third studio albums, Bad Habits (2019) and Good Intentions (2020), both debuted atop the Billboard 200. The latter album's lead single, "Turks" (with Gunna featuring Travis Scott), debuted at number 17 on the Billboard Hot 100 and remains his highest-charting song as a lead artist. Also in 2020, he guest appeared on the Internet Money, Gunna and Don Toliver's single "Lemonade", which peaked at number six on the chart and gave him his highest-charting entry overall. Later that year, he released his second commercial mixtape, Emergency Tsunami.

Nav's fourth studio album, Demons Protected by Angels (2022), debuted at number two on the Billboard 200. His 2023 single, "Calling" (with Metro Boomin and Swae Lee featuring A Boogie wit da Hoodie), yielded commercial success. His fifth studio album, OMW2 Rexdale (2025), lukewarmly entered the Billboard 200.

== Early life ==
Navraj Singh Goraya was born on November 3, 1989, in Toronto, Ontario, into a poor immigrant Punjabi Sikh family, from Punjab, India. He was raised in the Rexdale neighbourhood. His mother was involved in computer manufacturing and his father operated a forklift. Nav first became interested in music after his mother bought him a boombox in the third grade. His uncle was also a popular Punjabi singer in India and brought him to a studio. He began making mash-ups in high school and producing beats for local underground Toronto artists, and became popular on SoundCloud. Nav first started producing using Sony's ACID Pro software. He attended West Humber Junior Middle School and then later attended Thistletown Collegiate Institute for his high school education and had to spend an additional year to graduate. Following high school, he attended and graduated from Metalworks Institute in Mississauga, Ontario, in 2010 with a diploma in Audio Production and Engineering.

== Career ==
=== 2015–2018: Commercial debut, Nav, and Perfect Timing ===
On July 29, 2015, fellow Canadian rapper and singer Drake released the single "Back to Back", which Nav helped co-produce. On September 4, 2015, Nav released one of his earliest singles on SoundCloud and YouTube, "Take Me Simple", which has accumulated over eighteen million listens. He released the single "Ten Toes Down" (abbreviated as "TTD" on streaming services) on SoundCloud and YouTube on December 15, 2015. In 2016, another one of his SoundCloud and YouTube-exclusive singles, "The Man", was played on Drake's OVO Sound Radio. On January 12, 2016, Nav released the single "Myself" on SoundCloud and YouTube, which quickly became his biggest song at the time, earning him numerous cosigns, including one from American model and internet personality Kylie Jenner. On June 4, 2016, he released the single "Up" on SoundCloud and YouTube. Following the popularity of the singles, he was signed to XO and Republic Records, after being called by his now-manager Amir "Cash" Esmailian. On September 2, 2016, Nav was featured on and solely produced the single "Beibs in the Trap" by Travis Scott, as part of the latter's second studio album, Birds in the Trap Sing McKnight, in which the song reached number 90 on the US Billboard Hot 100 and was eventually certified double platinum by the Recording Industry Association of America (RIAA) after selling over two million copies.

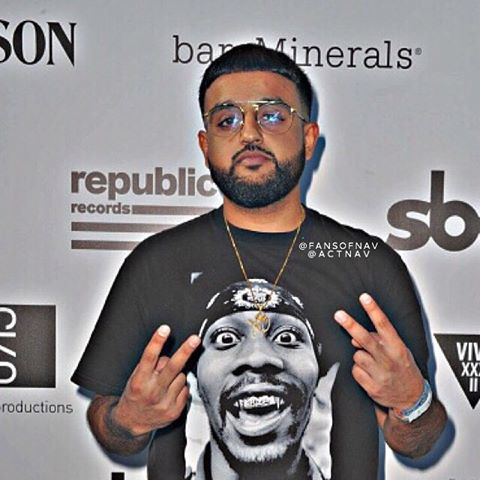
Nav at Coachella in 2017

On December 24, 2016, American record producer Metro Boomin, who helped produce "Up", took to Twitter to announce that he and Nav would be releasing a collaborative project in 2017. On February 15, 2017, Nav released his debut single, "Some Way" featuring the Weeknd, who is his label boss from XO, as the lead single from his self-titled debut mixtape, which was released exactly nine days later. Exactly, one week after the release of the single, Nav tweeted that his collaborative mixtape with Metro Boomin would be titled Perfect Timing. "Myself" was chosen as the second and final single from Nav's self-titled mixtape as it was sent to rhythmic contemporary radio on April 11, 2017. On July 14, 2017, Nav and Metro Boomin released "Perfect Timing (Intro)" and "Call Me", the dual lead singles of Perfect Timing, which was released exactly a week later.

=== 2018–2019: Reckless and Bad Habits ===
On November 7, 2017, Nav was featured on the single "Bali" by Canadian hip hop duo 88Glam, which consisted of rappers and now-former XO signees Derek Wise and 88Camino before the duo split in late 2022, as part of the duo's self-titled debut mixtape. Three days later, he released the single "Wanted You" featuring Lil Uzi Vert, which became his first single as a lead artist, as well as a credited artist, to chart on the Billboard Hot 100, reaching number 64. In February 2018, Nav received a Juno Award nomination for Breakthrough Artist of the Year at the Juno Awards of 2018. On March 16, 2018, he released the single "Freshman List", which saw him taking aim at the magazine XXL for not including him in their segment of the same name to highlight up-and-coming artists in 2017. On April 6, 2018, Nav was featured on the single "Maintain" by fellow XO signee Belly, which later appeared on the latter's second studio album, Immigrant. On April 26, 2018, during his concert for his "Freshman Tour" in Los Angeles, he announced that he would be releasing two projects that year, in which he said that his debut studio album would be titled Reckless and that he would also be releasing another collaborative mixtape with Metro Boomin titled Perfect Timing 2, which is a sequel to their project together that was released in 2017, but the latter project has still not been released as of 2023. The next day, Nav took to social media to announce that Travis Scott, who came out to perform "Beibs in the Trap" with him onstage the previous day, would be featured on a song from Reckless. On May 18, 2018, Nav released Reckless, with "Wanted You" and "Freshman List" serving as the respective lead and second singles. "Champion" featuring Travis Scott was chosen as the third and final single from the album as it was sent to rhythmic contemporary radio on June 26, 2018. On August 3, 2018, Nav was featured alongside Gunna on the single "Yosemite" by Travis Scott, as part of the latter's third studio album, Astroworld, which he received worldwide attention because his voice was initially mixed at a lower volume, but it was fixed and re-released with a better mix at the correct volume eight days later.

On November 2, 2018, Nav released the single "Know Me". He received two Juno Award nominations for Fan Choice and Rap Recording of the Year at the Juno Awards of 2019 for Reckless. On March 22, 2019, Nav released his second studio album, Bad Habits, with "Know Me" serving as the lead single. Four days later, he released the deluxe edition of the album and "Price on My Head" featuring the Weeknd was chosen as the second single of the album on the same day. It debuted number one on the US Billboard 200. "Tap" featuring Meek Mill was chosen as the third and final single from the album as it was sent to rhythmic contemporary radio on May 7, 2019. On June 28, 2019, Mustard released his third studio album, Perfect Ten, with Nav featured alongside Playboi Carti and A Boogie wit da Hoodie on the fourth track, "Baguettes in the Face".

=== 2020: Good Intentions, Brown Boy 2, and Emergency Tsunami ===
On March 27, 2020, Nav released a collaboration with Gunna titled "Turks" featuring Travis Scott. The song became his highest-charting song in the United States as it reached number 17 on the Billboard Hot 100 and served as the lead single from his third studio album, Good Intentions. The album was released on May 8 and debuted at number one on the US Billboard 200. Three days later, Nav released its deluxe edition with a reissued album titled Brown Boy 2, which also serves as a sequel to his unofficial EP, Brown Boy, which his manager Cash released exclusively on Audiomack in 2019. Soon after the release of the albums, Nav released a merchandise collaboration with Vlone and Virgil Abloh for the album. On August 14, Nav was featured on the single "Lemonade" by record label Internet Money, Gunna, and Don Toliver, which later appeared the label's debut studio album, B4 the Storm, and gave Nav his highest-charting song ever as it reached number seven on the Hot 100. On November 6, 2020, Nav released his second commercial mixtape, Emergency Tsunami. Five days later, he released a bonus version of the mixtape. "Young Wheezy", a collaboration with Gunna, was chosen as the lead and only single from the mixtape as it was sent to rhythmic contemporary radio on January 12, 2021.

=== 2022–present: Demons Protected by Angels and OMW2 Rexdale ===
On June 27, 2022, Nav shared that his fourth studio album would be titled Demons Protected by Angels. He released a collaboration with Lil Baby titled "Never Sleep" featuring Travis Scott, which serves as the album's lead single, on July 29. Nav solely produced the second single, "Wrong Decisions", which was released on August 23, 2022. The album was released on September 9, 2022, and a collaboration with Don Toliver titled "One Time" featuring Future, was chosen as the third single four days later. On October 1, 2022, Nav shared that he would be releasing his now-scrapped third commercial mixtape, Nav2, a sequel to his self-titled mixtape, which was released back in 2017. On February 10, 2023, he released the single "Lately", which was expected to serve as the lead single from the mixtape. On May 21, 2023, Metro Boomin joined Nav onstage during the latter's performance at the Metro Metro Festival in Montreal, which was before his own set at the festival, in which the two announced that their collaborative mixtape, Perfect Timing 2, which they originally announced in 2018, would be released soon. Exactly ten days later, Nav released a collaboration with Metro Boomin and Swae Lee titled "Calling" featuring A Boogie wit da Hoodie, which later appeared on Metro's first soundtrack album, which was for the film Spider-Man: Across the Spider-Verse.

In April 2024, Nav performed twice at the Coachella festival in Indio, California, on April 14 and April 21, where he announced the title On My Way 2 Rexdale at the end of his performance on the former date although it was unclear whether it was a single or a project and performed the then-unreleased song from the album titled "Red" on the latter date. He released a trailer video for it on May 14, where he confirmed its title and the fact that it would be his fifth studio album with a release set for the summer of that year, which did not happen for unknown reasons. Nav was featured on an updated version of Australian singer Lithe's single, "Fall Back", on August 16. He announced release date of the official and now-shortened title of the album, OMW2 Rexdale, along with its final trailer video on March 18. Nav released a collaboration with Metro Boomin titled "Real Me" as its lead and only single three days later, followed by the album being released on March 28.

== Controversies ==
In early 2017, Nav received backlash for saying the slur "nigga” in some of his songs. In an interview with Complex on July 21, 2017, Nav stated that the neighbourhood he grew up in is very "multicultural" with members of the "Chinese to white to black to Jamaican..." openly using the word with one another. He admitted that he and his friends constantly used the word with one another, but he saw some backlash once he had gained some popularity. He also stated that he would not say the word in his music anymore, starting from his collaborative mixtape with Metro Boomin titled Perfect Timing, which was released on the same day as the interview.

Nav publicly criticized XXL through a series of tweets and Instagram posts along with releasing the single "Freshman List" on March 16, 2018. His main reason for criticizing the magazine was due to not being selected for the 2018 freshman cover. In his tweets, Nav shared his thoughts that had ranged "from angry and bitter to motivational and inspirational". After his tweets and release of the single, Nav began addressing the outlet's editor-in-chief Vanessa Satten through now deleted Instagram posts and further continued to criticize the outlet.

In March 2019, during an interview with Pitchfork, Nav was quoted by an interviewer to say: "Fame is something I want, it's a good problem to have. I'm still not there, because when I walk out of fucking Delilah in L.A. and TMZ will be standing out there with cameras and not even take a picture of me, I get sick. I get in my fucking Lambo truck right in front of them. All my jewellery on and they don't even take one picture". However, he later clarified that this was taken out of context, as "sick" is in fact a positive term in Toronto slang, and rather than being disgusted for not being recognized, he is grateful to still have anonymity as a celebrity. Nav further stated in the Pitchfork interview that he hoped his latest project, Bad Habits would help him become more noticed by TMZ along with other paparazzi. A week later, a TMZ interviewer found Nav in New York and did a brief video interview with him, asking him questions about a possible collaborative project with Lil Uzi Vert.

== Discography ==
Studio albums

- Reckless (2018)
- Bad Habits (2019)
- Good Intentions (2020)
- Demons Protected by Angels (2022)
- OMW2 Rexdale (2025)

== Concert tours ==
Headlining

- Freshman Tour (2018)
- Bad Habits Tour (2019)
- Never Sleep Tour (2023)

Supporting

- The Weeknd – Starboy: Legend of the Fall Tour (2017)
- Schoolboy Q – Crash Tour (2019)
- Young Thug – The New Generation Tour (2026)

== Awards and nominations ==
Year	Awards	Category	Work	Result
2018	Juno Award	Breakthrough Artist of the Year		Nominated
2019	Juno Award	Fan Choice		Nominated
2019	Juno Award	Rap Recording of the Year	Reckless	Nominated
2020	Juno Award	Fan Choice		Nominated
2020	Juno Award	Rap Recording of the Year	Bad Habits	Nominated
