= Freshman List =

2018 single by Nav

Single by Nav

from the album Reckless
- Released: March 16, 2018
- Length: 3:06
- Label: XO; Republic
- Songwriters: Navraj Goraya; Masamune Kudo; Ryan Vojtesak
- Producers: Rex Kudo; Charlie Handsome

Nav singles chronology
| "Phone" (2017) | "Freshman List" (2018) | "Maintain" (2018) |

"Freshman List" is a song by Canadian rapper Nav, released on March 16, 2018, as the second single from his debut studio album Reckless (2018). Produced by Rex Kudo and Charlie Handsome, it sees Nav taking aim at the hip hop magazine XXL.

== Background and composition ==
In the song, Nav raps in his signature melodic flow while criticizing XXL, boastfully implying he is one of the best new artists of his time; he sings in the hook, "I was made for this shit, rookie of the year / I wouldn't show up for the Freshman list / Your swag expired, you ain't fresh like this / Shit on all my haters, I'ma make them pissed," He later details his rise from producing to rapping.

== Charts ==
| Chart (2018) | Peak position |
|---|---|
| Canada Hot 100 (Billboard) | 49 |

== Certifications ==
| Region | Certification | Certified units/sales |
|---|---|---|
| Canada (Music Canada) | Platinum | 80,000^{‡} |
^{‡} Sales+streaming figures based on certification alone.
