= Beibs in the Trap =

2016 song by Travis Scott featuring Nav

Song by Travis Scott featuring Nav

from the album Birds in the Trap Sing McKnight
- Released: September 2, 2016
- Recorded: 2016
- Studio: Record Plant (Los Angeles)
- Genre: Trap
- Length: 3:33
- Label: Grand Hustle; Epic
- Songwriters: Jacques Webster II; Navraj Goraya; Amir Esmailian
- Producer: Nav

Music video
- "Beibs in the Trap" on YouTube

"Beibs in the Trap" (stylized in all lowercase) is a song by American rapper Travis Scott featuring vocals and sole production from Canadian rapper Nav. Written by the two alongside Cash XO, the track appears on the former's second studio album, Birds in the Trap Sing McKnight, which was released on September 2, 2016.

== Background ==
"Beibs in the Trap" is a reference to Canadian singer Justin Bieber, who featured alongside Young Thug on Scott's song "Maria I'm Drunk" from his debut studio album Rodeo (2015). Scott has also collaborated with Bieber on "No Sense" from Bieber's fourth studio album Purpose (2015). Scott and Bieber later collaborated on "Second Emotion" from Bieber's fifth studio album Changes (2020).

== Music video ==
The music video for "Beibs in the Trap", directed by RJ Sanchez, premiered on December 28, 2016, via Scott's Vevo channel. It features Scott and Nav performing the song at a hangar filled with flashing lights and models. A metallic silver Lamborghini is showcased throughout the entire video. Peter A. Berry from XXL wrote; "The lights and the models' wardrobes make this visual seem like something ripped directly from the upcoming Ghost in the Shell movie, and it looks more than a little cool." Eric Skelton of Pigeons & Planes wrote that all that is missing is "[Justin] Bieber sitting in the corner wearing metallic Hammer pants".

== Commercial performance ==
After the release of the music video, "Beibs in the Trap" debuted at number 93 on the US Billboard Hot 100, and later peaked at number 90 on the chart. The song was eventually certified 2× Platinum by the Recording Industry Association of America (RIAA) for sales of over two million copies in the United States.

== Charts ==
Chart (2016–2017)	Peak position
Canada Hot 100 (Billboard)	52
US Billboard Hot 100	90
US Hot R&B/Hip-Hop Songs (Billboard)	38

== Certifications ==
Region	Certification	Certified units/sales
Australia (ARIA)	Platinum	70,000^{‡}
Brazil (Pro-Música Brasil)	Gold	30,000^{‡}
Canada (Music Canada)	2× Platinum	160,000^{‡}
Denmark (IFPI Danmark)	Gold	45,000^{‡}
Mexico (AMPROFON)	Gold	30,000^{‡}
New Zealand (RMNZ)	Platinum	30,000^{‡}
United Kingdom (BPI)	Silver	200,000^{‡}
United States (RIAA)	4× Platinum	4,000,000^{‡}
^{‡} Sales+streaming figures based on certification alone.
