= 88Glam (mixtape) =

2017 mixtape by 88Glam

Mixtape by 88Glam
- Released: November 7, 2017
- Length: 55:11
- Label: Self-released
- Producers: AlexOnWeed; Cahl Miller; Cubeatz; Joseph L'étranger; Murda Beatz; WondaGurl; Villa Beatz; Yung Shrimp Tempura

88Glam chronology
88Glam (2017)	88Glam2 (2018)

Singles from 88Glam
- 1. "12" Released: November 1, 2017; 2. "Bali" Released: November 7, 2017; 3. "Big Tymers" Released: December 7, 2017

88Glam (stylized in all caps) is the self-titled debut mixtape by Canadian hip hop duo 88Glam. It was self-released on November 7, 2017. The mixtape features a sole guest appearance from Nav. It was re-released through XO Records and Republic Records on April 20, 2018. It features an additional guest appearance from 2 Chainz. The production on the mixtape was handled by Murda Beatz, WondaGurl, Cubeatz, AlexOnWeed, Joseph L'étranger, and Villa Beatz, among others.

== Background and release ==
On October 31, 2017, the duo hosted a listening party for friends and family in Toronto. In a statement with Billboard, the duo states,

88GLAM was an idea that people saw the potential for before we did. It's rare that two different aesthetics can meet the way ours do and create something so organic.

The lead single of the mixtape, "12", the duo's debut single, was released on November 1, 2017. The music video premiered on Billboard and was directed by Dan LeMoyne. The second single, "Bali", which features Canadian rapper Nav, the duo's now-former labelmate from XO, was released alongside the mixtape on November 7, 2017. The third and final single, "Big Tymers", was released on December 7, 2017.

== Critical reception ==
Professional ratings
Review scores
Source	Rating
Exclaim!	6/10

Scott Glaysher of Exclaim! wrote that the album is best enjoyed for what it is: "a satisfying, distorted trap-a-thon with plenty of hearty beats and boastful bravado."

== Track listing ==
88Glam – Standard edition
No.	Title	Writer(s)	Producer(s)	Length
1.	"12"	Derek Bissue; Shakqueel Burthwright; Alexander Geisler	AlexOnWeed	3:15
2.	"Ricardo"	Bissue; Burthwright; Geisler; Aaron Watkins	AlexOnWeed; Villa Beatz	3:40
3.	"Bali" (featuring Nav)	Bissue; Burthwright; Navraj Goraya; Geisler; Watkins	AlexOnWeed; Villa Beatz	3:05
4.	"Ice on My Leash"	Bissue; Burthwright; Jeremy McIntyre	Joseph L'étranger	3:04
5.	"Lavish"	Bissue; Burthwright; McIntyre	Joseph L'étranger	2:54
6.	"Big Tymers"	Bissue; Burthwright; McIntyre	Joseph L'étranger	2:45
7.	"Chemistry"	Bissue; Burthwright; Geisler	AlexOnWeed	2:56
8.	"Give n Go"	Bissue; Burthwright; Shane Lindstrom; Ebony Oshunrinde; Tim Gomringer; Kevin Gomringer	Murda Beatz; WondaGurl; Cubeatz	2:54
9.	"Cake"	Bissue; Burthwright; McIntyre	Joseph L'étranger	3:31
10.	"Kyrie"	Bissue; Burthwright; Geisler; Watkins	AlexOnWeed; Villa Beatz	3:24
11.	"Baby Bro"	Bissue; Burthwright; McIntyre	Joseph L'étranger	4:03
12.	"Heisman"	Bissue; Burthwright; Geisler; Watkins	AlexOnWeed; Villa Beatz	3:00
13.	"Marina"	Bissue; Burthwright; McIntyre	Joseph L'étranger	2:51
Total length:				41:22

88Glam Reloaded – Reissue deluxe edition (bonus tracks)
No.	Title	Writer(s)	Producer(s)	Length
14.	"Twin Turbo"	Bissue; Burthwright; Cahl Miller; Quincy Nanatakyi	Miller; Yung Shrimp Tempura	3:07
15.	"Celebrity Crush"	Bissue; Burthwright; McIntyre	Joseph L'étranger	2:59
16.	"On Sight"	Bissue; Burthwright; McIntyre; Geisler	AlexOnWeed; Joseph L'étranger	3:24
17.	"Bali" (Remix) (featuring Nav and 2 Chainz)	Bissue; Burthwright; Goraya; Tauheed Epps; Geisler; Watkins	AlexOnWeed; Villa Beatz	4:19
Total length:				55:11

== Personnel ==
All programming is credited to the producers of each track, except where noted.

Musicians

- AlexOnWeed – keyboards (tracks 1–3, 7, 10, 12, 16, 17)
- Villa Beatz – keyboards (tracks 2, 3, 10, 12, 17)
- Joseph L'étranger – keyboards (tracks 4–6, 9, 11, 13, 15, 16)
- Murda Beatz – keyboards (track 8), programming (track 8)
- WondaGurl – keyboards (track 8), programming (track 8)
- Cubeatz – keyboards (track 8), programming (track 8)
- Cahl Miller – keyboards (track 14)
- Yung Shrimp Tempura – keyboards (track 14)

Technical

- AlexOnWeed – recording (all tracks), mixer (all tracks)
- Yung Shrimp Tempura – recording assistant (tracks 1, 4–8, 14)
- Villa Beatz – recording assistant (tracks 2, 3, 9–13, 15–17)

Additional personnel

- Mihailo Andic – art direction, photography
- Andrew Park – art direction

== Charts ==
Chart performance for 88Glam
Chart (2017)	Peak position
Canadian Albums (Billboard)	95
