= Champion (Nav song) =

2018 single by Nav featuring Travis Scott

Single by Nav featuring Travis Scott

from the album Reckless
- Released: June 26, 2018
- Length: 3:15
- Label: XO; Republic
- Songwriters: Navraj Goraya; Jacques Webster II; Amir Esmailian; Michael Hernandez; Ozan Yildirim
- Producers: Foreign Teck; OZ

Nav singles chronology
"What You Want" (2018)	"Champion" (2018)	"Know Me" (2018)

Travis Scott singles chronology
"Watch" (2018)	"Champion" (2018)	"Dangerous World" (2018)

Music video
- "Champion" on YouTube

"Champion" is a song by Canadian rapper Nav, featuring American rapper and singer Travis Scott. It was sent to rhythmic contemporary radio on June 26, 2018, as the third, and final single from the former's debut studio album, Reckless.

== Music video ==
The music video was released on August 9, 2018. Filmed in Hawaii, it features cameos from rappers Gunna, Sheck Wes and Don Toliver.

== Charts ==
Chart (2018)	Peak position
Canada Hot 100 (Billboard)	47
US Billboard Hot 100	86
US Hot R&B/Hip-Hop Songs (Billboard)	43

== Certifications ==
Region	Certification	Certified units/sales
Canada (Music Canada)	4× Platinum	320,000^{‡}
New Zealand (RMNZ)	Gold	15,000^{‡}
Portugal (AFP)	Gold	5,000^{‡}
United Kingdom (BPI)	Silver	200,000^{‡}
United States (RIAA)	2× Platinum	2,000,000^{‡}
^{‡} Sales+streaming figures based on certification alone.
