= Brown skin =

Brown skin may refer to:

- A tint of brown human skin color
  - Olive skin, for light brown skin
  - Dark skin, for dark brown skin
- Brown (racial classification)
- "Brown Skin", 2001 single by India.Arie

== See also ==
- Brown (disambiguation)
- Skin (disambiguation)
