= Tap (song) =

2019 single by Nav featuring Meek Mill

Single by Nav featuring Meek Mill

from the album Bad Habits
- Released: May 7, 2019
- Genre: Hip hop; trap
- Length: 2:28
- Label: XO; Republic
- Songwriters: Navraj Goraya; Robert Williams; Amir Esmailian; London Holmes; Westen Weiss
- Producers: London on da Track; Weiss

Nav singles chronology
"Price on My Head" (2019)	"Tap" (2019)	"Called It" (2019)

Meek Mill singles chronology
"24/7" (2019)	"Tap" (2019)	"100 Bands" (2019)

Music video
- "Tap" on YouTube

"Tap" is a song by Canadian rapper Nav, featuring vocals from American rapper Meek Mill. It was sent to rhythmic contemporary radio on May 7, 2019, one day after Meek Mill's 32nd birthday as the second single of Nav's second studio album, Bad Habits. The song peaked at number 87 on the Billboard Hot 100. The song was written by the two artists, along with Amir Esmailian and its producers London on da Track and Westen Weiss, The music video for the song was released on June 13, 2019.

== Content ==
In the song, Meek Mill and Nav rap about their experiences in the streets, their rise to success, and the challenges they faced. The lyrics touch on themes such as street life, violence, loyalty, and the trappings of fame. Meek Mill talks about his background, spending time in the trap, facing attempts at extortion, and his encounters with the law. NAV reflects on his journey, mentioning his brother's incarceration, the grind to success, and his encounters with love and luxury.

== Critical reception ==
Jibril Yassin of HotNewHipHop wrote that Meek Mill's verse "succeeds in finding the sweet spot between his trademark high energy and Nav's languid soundscapes." Quincy of RatingsGameMusic praised the song, calling it a "sly banger" that features a "raw ass verse by Meek [Mill]".

== Charts ==
=== Weekly charts ===
Chart (2019)	Peak position
Canada Hot 100 (Billboard)	46
New Zealand Hot Singles (Recorded Music NZ)	33
US Billboard Hot 100	87
US Hot R&B/Hip-Hop Songs (Billboard)	36
US Rhythmic Airplay (Billboard)	22
US Rolling Stone Top 100	64

=== Year-end charts ===
Chart (2019)	Position
US Hot R&B/Hip-Hop Songs (Billboard)	95

== Certifications ==
Region	Certification	Certified units/sales
Canada (Music Canada)	3× Platinum	240,000^{‡}
United States (RIAA)	2× Platinum	2,000,000^{‡}
^{‡} Sales+streaming figures based on certification alone.

== Use in media ==
"Tap" was the official theme song of WWE Money in the Bank 2024.

== Release history ==
Region	Date	Format	Label	Ref.
United States	May 7, 2019	Rhythmic contemporary	XO; Republic	
