= Calling (Metro Boomin, Swae Lee and Nav song) =

2023 single by Metro Boomin, Swae Lee and Nav featuring A Boogie wit da Hoodie

Single by Metro Boomin, Swae Lee and Nav featuring A Boogie wit da Hoodie

from the album Spider-Man: Across the Spider-Verse (Soundtrack from and Inspired by the Motion Picture)
- Released: May 31, 2023
- Recorded: 2021–2022
- Genre: Pop rap
- Length: 3:39
- Label: Boominati; Republic
- Songwriters: Leland Wayne; Khalif Brown; Navraj Goraya; Artist Dubose; Jordan Holt-May; Christopher Townsend; Stephen Feigenbaum
- Producers: Metro Boomin; Xz

Metro Boomin singles chronology
"Creepin'" (2023)	"Calling" (2023)	"Née-Nah" (2024)

Swae Lee singles chronology
"Work It Out" (2023)	"Calling" (2023)	"Tension" (2023)

Nav singles chronology
"Lately" (2023)	"Calling" (2023)	"Looking at Me" (2023)

A Boogie wit da Hoodie singles chronology
"Chills (LA Hills)" (2023)	"Calling" (2023)	"Remember That" (2023)

Music video
- "Calling" on YouTube

"Calling" is a song by American record producer Metro Boomin, American rapper and singer Swae Lee, and Canadian rapper Nav featuring fellow American rapper and singer A Boogie wit da Hoodie. It was released through Boominati Worldwide and Republic Records as the lead and only single from Metro's first soundtrack album, which was for the film Spider-Man: Across the Spider-Verse, on May 31, 2023. Produced by Metro himself and Xz and co-produced by Johan Lenox, the three of them wrote the song alongside the three rappers and Landstrip Chip.

== Background and promotion ==
A music video composed entirely of clips from the movie with some lyrics was released the same day as the song and shows the relationship between Miles Morales and Gwen Stacy; the video omits A Boogie wit da Hoodie's verse and Swae Lee's last chorus, going straight to the orchestral outro after the second chorus that is sung after Nav's verse. "Calling" is a melodic song that sees the three rappers express their love for their respective significant others. Lyrically, it is also about finding oneself as a person while dealing with internal problems. The official music video for the song, which includes the four artists and clips inspired from the film, was released on September 6, 2023. The four artists performed the song together at Metro's set at the 2023 MTV Music Video Awards, where he also performed "Superhero (Heroes & Villains)" with fellow American rapper Future before "Calling".

== Charts ==
=== Weekly charts ===
Weekly chart performance for "Calling"
Chart (2023–2024)	Peak position
Australia (ARIA)	27
Australia Hip Hop/R&B (ARIA)	14
Canada Hot 100 (Billboard)	18
France (SNEP)	189
Global 200 (Billboard)	21
India International Singles (IMI)	7
Ireland (IRMA)	59
Malaysia (Billboard)	17
Malaysia International (RIM)	14
New Zealand (Recorded Music NZ)	25
Portugal (AFP)	99
Singapore (RIAS)	10
UK Singles (Official Charts)	56
UK Hip Hop/R&B (Official Charts)	27
US Billboard Hot 100	41
US Hot R&B/Hip-Hop Songs (Billboard)	13
US Pop Airplay (Billboard)	36
US Rhythmic Airplay (Billboard)	13
Vietnam (Vietnam Hot 100)	79

=== Year-end charts ===
Year-end chart performance for "Calling"
Chart (2023)	Position
US Hot R&B/Hip-Hop Songs (Billboard)	77

== Certifications ==
Certifications for "Calling"
Region	Certification	Certified units/sales
Australia (ARIA)	Gold	35,000^{‡}
Brazil (Pro-Música Brasil)	Platinum	40,000^{‡}
^{‡} Sales+streaming figures based on certification alone.
