= Myself (song) =

2017 single by Nav

Single by Nav

from the album Nav
- Released: January 12, 2016 (SoundCloud): April 11, 2017 (official release)
- Genre: Cloud rap
- Length: 3:46
- Label: XO; Republic
- Songwriter: Navraj Goraya
- Producer: Nav

Nav singles chronology
"Some Way" (2017)	"Myself" (2016)	"Perfect Timing (Intro)" / "Call Me" (2017)

Music video
- "Myself" on YouTube

"Myself" is a song written, produced, and performed by Canadian rapper Nav, originally released to SoundCloud and YouTube on January 12, 2016. It was officially released as the lead track from his self-titled debut mixtape on February 24, 2017 before being released as the second and final single on April 11 that same year. A music video was released on March 22, less than a month prior to its official release.

== Charts ==
Chart (2017)	Peak position
US Bubbling Under R&B/Hip-Hop Singles	5
US Rhythmic Airplay (Billboard)	31

== Certifications ==
Region	Certification	Certified units/sales
Canada (Music Canada)	4× Platinum	320,000^{‡}
New Zealand (RMNZ)	Gold	15,000^{‡}
United Kingdom (BPI)	Silver	200,000^{‡}
United States (RIAA)	3× Platinum	3,000,000^{‡}
^{‡} Sales+streaming figures based on certification alone.

== Release history ==
Region	Date	Format	Label(s)	Ref.
United States	April 11, 2017	Rhythmic contemporary		
