= Know Me =

2018 single by Nav

Single by Nav

from the album Bad Habits
- Released: November 2, 2018
- Length: 2:35
- Label: XO; Republic
- Songwriters: Navraj Goraya; Amir Esmailian; Andrew Franklin; Austin Schindler
- Producers: Pro Logic; Austin Powerz

Nav singles chronology
"Champion" (2018)	"Know Me" (2018)	"Yosemite" (2018)

Music video
- "Know Me" on YouTube

"Know Me" is a song by Canadian rapper Nav. It was released through XO and Republic Records on November 2, 2018, one day before his 29th birthday, as the lead single from his second studio album, Bad Habits (2019). Nav wrote the song alongside his manager, Cash, and also with producers Pro Logic and Austin Powerz. The song debuted and peaked at number 63 on the Canadian Hot 100.

== Background and composition ==
In an emailed statement to The Fader, Nav wrote about a studio session that led to the making of the song: "I was recording on of a lot of my own beats & of other producers. When I ran out I asked my engineer Pro Logic to play me some of his own beats -one of the first ones he played me became 'Know Me'." The song begins with Nav name-dropping the fashion brand Balenciaga, as he melodically raps about his sexual conquests with women, brags about his collection of VVS (Very, Very Slightly) diamonds and fame, referring to himself as the "hottest brown boy in the game".

== Music video ==
The official music video for "Know Me" was directed by David Camarena and released on November 8, 2018. In the video, Nav parks a bright red Ferrari in the driveway of a mansion. He struts through the insides of the mansion, which is splattered in glow-in-the-dark paint, in the company of "scantily clad" women and a python.

== Charts ==
Chart performance
Chart (2018)	Peak position
Canada Hot 100 (Billboard)	63

== Certifications ==
Certifications
Region	Certification	Certified units/sales
Canada (Music Canada)	Platinum	80,000^{‡}
^{‡} Sales+streaming figures based on certification alone.
