= Reckless (Nav album) =

2018 album by Nav

Studio album by Nav
- Released: May 18, 2018
- Recorded: 2017–2018
- Genres: Hip hop; trap
- Length: 40:02
- Labels: XO; Republic
- Producers: Nav; Ben Billions; Bobby Raps; Charlie Handsome; DaHeala; DannyBoyStyles; Foreign Teck; Maaly Raw; OZ; Rex Kudo; Trouble Trouble; Turbo; Wheezy

Nav chronology
Perfect Timing (2017)	Reckless (2018)	Bad Habits (2019)

Singles from Reckless
- 1. "Wanted You" Released: November 3, 2017; 2. "Freshman List" Released: March 16, 2018; 3. "Champion" Released: June 26, 2018

Reckless (stylized in all caps) is the debut studio album by Canadian rapper Nav. It was released on May 18, 2018, by XO Records and Republic Records. The album features guest appearances from Quavo, Travis Scott, Lil Uzi Vert, and Gunna. It features production from Nav himself, Wheezy, Ben Billions, Rex Kudo, Charlie Handsome, Foreign Teck, OZ, and Turbo, among others.

Reckless garnered mixed reviews from critics, praising the album's production and guest features but criticized its lyrical delivery. The album debuted at number eight on the US Billboard 200 and was supported by three singles: "Wanted You", "Freshman List" and "Champion".

== Background ==
Nav commented on the album during an interview with Tim Westwood, detailing that he's more involved than ever in the production process, continuing with the expectation of some big features with "no wack artists".

On April 27, 2018, the album's title was announced via Twitter.

During his night show in Houston, he revealed the album's release date, stating:

I'm dropping my album next week Friday. The wait is over. I just thought I would share that with Houston 'cause y'all so close to my heart.

The cover art and tracklist for the album was revealed via Instagram on May 16, 2018.

== Singles ==
The album's lead single, "Wanted You" featuring Lil Uzi Vert, was released for digital download on November 3, 2017, which was Nav's 28th birthday. The song was produced by Ben Billions. The music video was released on January 11, 2018. The music video was directed by Rough Sketchz. The song peaked at number 64 on the Billboard Hot 100.

The album's second single, "Freshman List", was released on March 16, 2018. The song was produced by Rex Kudo and Charlie Handsome.

The album's third single, "Champion" featuring Travis Scott, was sent to rhythmic contemporary radio on June 26, 2018.

== Critical reception ==
Professional ratings
Review scores
Source	Rating
GIGsoup	58%
DJBooth	(unfavourable)
HipHopDX	2.2/5
HotNewHipHop	56%
Pitchfork	5.3/10

Reckless received generally mixed reviews from music critics. Alphonse Pierre of Pitchfork stated that "Nav is whining, hiding behind braggadocio and making it an album that brings the listener down to the same place as the should be hitmaker." Online hip hop publication HotNewHipHop commented that "Without any sort of reconciliation with his demons, the album becomes a one-side therapy session and we, the listeners, don't get compensated enough to want to hold his hand as he figures himself out." Yoh Phillips of DJBooth wrote that "the production is solid, the features were solid, but Nav has no redeemable qualities."

== Commercial performance ==
Reckless debuted at number eight on the US Billboard 200 chart, earning 36,000 album-equivalent units with 4,000 in pure album sales in its first week. In its second week, the album dropped to number 24 on the chart. As of March 2019, the album has earned 387,000 album-equivalent units in the United States. The songs from the album has earned over a half-billion on-demand streams. On March 27, 2020, the album was certified gold by the Recording Industry Association of America (RIAA) for combined sales and album-equivalent units of over 500,000 units in the United States.

== Track listing ==
Credits adapted from Tidal.

No.	Title	Writer(s)	Producer(s)	Length
1.	"Reckless Intro"	Navraj Goraya; Danny Schofield	Nav; DannyBoyStyles	2:22
2.	"Never Change"	Goraya; Amir Esmailian; Schofield	Nav; DannyBoyStyles	3:01
3.	"Hold Your Hand"	Goraya; Masamune Kudo; Jamaal Henry	Rex Kudo; Maaly Raw	3:54
4.	"Faith" (featuring Quavo)	Goraya; Quavious Marshall; Esmailian; Jordan Bacchus	Nav; Trouble Trouble	3:19
5.	"Champion" (featuring Travis Scott)	Goraya; Jacques Webster II; Esmailian; Ozan Yildirim; Michael Hernandez; Divashen	OZ; Foreign Teck	3:15
6.	"Glow Up"	Goraya; Esmailian; Schofield	Nav; DannyBoyStyles	2:40
7.	"Just Happened"	Goraya; Esmailian; Schofield; Robert Richardson	Nav; DannyBoyStyles; Bobby Raps	3:21
8.	"Wanted You" (featuring Lil Uzi Vert)	Goraya; Symere Woods; Esmailian; Khaled Khaled; Benjamin Diehl	Ben Billions	3:48
9.	"With Me"	Goraya; Esmailian; Diehl	Nav; Ben Billions	2:54
10.	"Eat" (featuring Gunna)	Goraya; Sergio Kitchens; Chandler Durham	Turbo	3:22
11.	"Freshman List"	Goraya; Kudo; Ryan Vojtesak	Rex Kudo; Charlie Handsome	3:06
12.	"What I Need / Daheala Outro"	Goraya; Kudo; Jason Quenneville; Wesley Glass	Rex Kudo; DaHeala; Wheezy	5:00
Total length:				40:02

Notes

- "Just Happened" features background vocals from Bobby Raps.

== Personnel ==
All programming is credited to the producers of each track, except where noted.

Musicians

- DannyBoyStyles – keyboards (tracks 1, 2, 6, 7)
- Nav – keyboards (tracks 1, 2, 4, 6, 7, 9)
- Rex Kudo – keyboards (tracks 3, 11), programming (track 12)
- Ben Billions – keyboards (tracks 8, 9)
- Turbo – keyboards (track 10)
- Wheezy – programming (track 12)

Technical

- DannyBoyStyles – recording (tracks 1, 6)
- Ethan Stevens – recording (tracks 8, 11)
- Jaycen Joshua – mixing (all tracks)
- Shin Kamiyama – mixing (tracks 1–7, 9–12), recording (tracks 2–5, 8, 9, 12)
- David Nakaji – mixing assistant (track 8)
- Iván Jiménez – mixing assistant (track 8)

== Charts ==
=== Weekly charts ===
Chart (2018)	Peak position
Belgian Albums (Ultratop Flanders)	110
Canadian Albums (Billboard)	5
Dutch Albums (Album Top 100)	42
New Zealand Heatseeker Albums (RMNZ)	1
UK Albums (Official Charts)	24
US Billboard 200	8
US Top R&B/Hip-Hop Albums (Billboard)	5

=== Year-end charts ===
Chart (2018)	Position
US Top R&B/Hip-Hop Albums (Billboard)	91

== Certifications ==
Region	Certification	Certified units/sales
Canada (Music Canada)	Platinum	80,000^{‡}
United States (RIAA)	Gold	500,000^{‡}
^{‡} Sales+streaming figures based on certification alone.
