= Bad Habits (Nav album) =

- Standard cover art for the album, deluxe edition features a green tint as opposed to red and yellow. In addition, the word “deluxe” is featured horizontally on both sides of the cover.

Studio album by Nav
- Released: March 22, 2019
- Recorded: 2017–19
- Genres: Hip hop; trap
- Length: 47:34
- Labels: XO; Republic
- Producers: Nav; AlexOnWeed; ATL Jacob; Austin Powerz; Cubeatz; DaHeala; DannyBoyStyles; Derek Wise; Frost; Khemasis; London on da Track; Mixx; Money Musik; OZ; Pro Logic; Rasta Papii; Rex Kudo; Tay Keith; Trouble Trouble; Westen Weiss; Wheezy; WondaGurl

Nav chronology
Reckless (2018)	Bad Habits (2019)	Good Intentions (2020)

Singles from Bad Habits
- 1. "Know Me" Released: November 2, 2018; 2. "Price on My Head" Released: March 26, 2019; 3. "Tap" Released: May 7, 2019

Bad Habits is the second studio album by Canadian rapper Nav. It was released through XO Records and Republic Records on March 22, 2019. The album features guest appearances from The Weeknd, Meek Mill, Young Thug, Gunna, and Lil Durk. The deluxe edition was released four days later on March 26, 2019. It features additional guest appearances from Future and then-XO labelmate duo 88Glam. It follows his previous album, Reckless (2018), as well as his unofficial Brown Boy EP, released a week and a day before Bad Habits. The album debuted at number one on the Billboard Canadian Albums chart as well as the US Billboard 200, becoming Nav's first chart-topper on both.

== Background ==
On March 17, 2019, CashXO released NAV's Brown Boy EP which consisted of 5 tracks exclusively on Audiomack announced the album's title and release date.

The cover art was revealed via Instagram on March 19, 2019, with the tracklist on March 21, 2019.

A track titled "Habits" featuring Lil Uzi Vert was supposed to be released on the album. According to Nav, the heads of Lil Uzi Vert's label, DJ Drama and Don Cannon, would not legally clear Lil Uzi Vert's verse. In a statement to Complex, DJ Drama said, "It's not about the money because we turned down $100k."

On March 26, 2019, the deluxe version of Bad Habits was released, which features new guest appearances from Future and 88Glam, alongside all the songs from the Brown Boy EP. The originally unreleased track "Habits" which was supposed to feature Lil Uzi Vert, was also released as a solo version. According to Nav, he recorded Lil Uzi Vert's verse himself and put it on the song.

== Singles ==
The album's lead single, "Know Me", was released for digital download on November 2, 2018. The song was produced by Pro Logic and Austin Powerz. The music video was released on November 8, 2018. The music video was directed by David Camarena. The song peaked at number sixty-three on the Billboard Canadian Hot 100. "Price on My Head", featuring Canadian singer-songwriter the Weeknd, was released as the second single on March 26, 2019, the same day that Nav released the deluxe edition of the album. "Tap", featuring American rapper Meek Mill, was released as the third single on May 7, 2019.

== Critical reception ==
Professional ratings
Aggregate scores
Source	Rating
Metacritic	52/100
Review scores
Source	Rating
AllMusic	2.5/5 stars
Exclaim!	5/10
Highsnobiety	2/5
HipHopDX	3.2/5
Pitchfork	4.6/10

Bad Habits received mixed reviews from music critics, citing a lack of boldness and originality. At Metacritic, which assigns a normalized rating out of 100 to reviews from mainstream publications, the album received an average score of 52, based on 4 reviews, indicating "mixed or average" reviews.

Reed Jackson of Pitchfork wrote, "At its best, [the album's] songs are serviceable bangers to nod off in the club to; at its worst, it's a collection of strange admissions that, thanks to Nav's affinity for taking himself too seriously, come off cringe-worthy." Reviewer Riley Wallace of Exclaim! praised specific tracks such as "Tension" and "Why You Crying Mama", though he felt that the album ultimately "fails to either navigate into new territory long enough to hold attention or do anything to further NAV as an artist." AllMusic criticized Nav's lack of originality, uninspired lyrical content, and the repetitive nature of the beats on the album, describing it as going from "generic fun to mind-numbing tedium."

== Commercial performance ==
Bad Habits debuted at number one on the US Billboard 200 with 82,000 album-equivalent units, of which 24,000 were pure album sales in its first week. The reason for its high sales was mostly due to merchandise bundles which resulted in about 20,000 extra sales. It became Nav's first US number-one album. The album also accumulated a total of 79.08 million on-demand audio streams for the album's songs, making it the most streamed album of the week. In its second week, the album dropped to number six on the chart, earning an additional 35,000 units that week. On May 20, 2020, the album was certified gold by the Recording Industry Association of America (RIAA) for combined sales and album-equivalent units of over 500,000 units.

In Nav's home country of Canada, Bad Habits debuted at number one on the Canadian Albums Chart, selling 10,000 album-equivalent units in its first week. On June 26, 2019, the album was certified gold by Music Canada (MC) for sales of over 40,000 copies in Canada.

== Track listing ==
Credits adapted from Tidal.

No.	Title	Writer(s)	Producer(s)	Length
1.	"To My Grave"	Navraj Goraya; Ozan Yıldırım; Andrew Franklin	OZ; Pro Logic	2:40
2.	"I'm Ready"	Goraya; Ebony Oshunrinde; Timothy Gomringer; Kevin Gomringer	WondaGurl; Cubeatz^{[a]}	2:54
3.	"Taking Chances"	Goraya; Mohkom Bhangal; Jordan Bacchus	Nav; Money Musik; Trouble Trouble	3:06
4.	"Tap" (featuring Meek Mill)	Goraya; Robert Williams; Amir Esmailian; London Holmes; Westen Weiss	London on da Track; Weiss	2:28
5.	"Tension"	Goraya; Esmailian; Bhangal; Bacchus; Sugar-Ray Henry; Jason Quenneville	Nav; Money Musik; Trouble Trouble; Frost; DaHeala^{[b]}	3:05
6.	"Price on My Head" (featuring the Weeknd)	Goraya; Abel Tesfaye; Ahmad Balshe; Derek Bissue; Bradley Geisler	Derek Wise; AlexOnWeed	3:37
7.	"Ralo"	Goraya; Bhangal; Bacchus; S. Henry	Nav; Money Musik; Trouble Trouble; Frost	3:04
8.	"Tussin" (featuring Young Thug)	Goraya; Jeffery Williams; Esmailian; Bhangal; Jacob Canady; Ezekiel Henry; Divashen Govender	Nav; Money Musik; ATL Jacob; Rasta Papii	2:59
9.	"Snap"	Goraya; Bhangal; Bacchus	Nav; Money Musik; Trouble Trouble	2:49
10.	"Hold Your Breath" (featuring Gunna)	Goraya; Sergio Kitchens; Baruch Nembhard; Caleb Nordelus; Moses Georges	Mixx; Khemasis^{[a]}	2:50
11.	"Why You Crying Mama"	Goraya; Bhangal; Bacchus; S. Henry	Nav; Money Musik; Trouble Trouble; Frost	4:13
12.	"Time Piece" (featuring Lil Durk)	Goraya; Durk Banks; Bhangal; Bacchus	Nav; Money Musik; Trouble Trouble	3:27
13.	"Dior Runners"	Goraya; Bhangal; Bacchus; S. Henry; Danny Schofield	Nav; Money Musik; Trouble Trouble; DannyBoyStyles	2:46
14.	"Vicodin"	Goraya; Bhangal; Bacchus; S. Henry; Schofield	Nav; Money Musik; Trouble Trouble; Frost; DannyBoyStyles^{[b]}	2:11
15.	"Stuck with Me"	Goraya; Bhangal; Bacchus; Schofield	Nav; Money Musik; Trouble Trouble; DannyBoyStyles^{[b]}	2:50
16.	"Know Me"	Goraya; Esmailian; Franklin; Austin Schindler	Pro Logic; Austin Powerz	2:35
Total length:				47:34

Deluxe bonus tracks
No.	Title	Writer(s)	Producer(s)	Length
17.	"Amazing" (featuring Future)	Goraya; Nayvadius Wilburn; Esmailian; Brytavious Chambers	Tay Keith	2:18
18.	"Habits"	Goraya; Wesley Glass; Masamune Kudo	Wheezy; Rex Kudo	3:24
19.	"Rack in My Sleep" (featuring 88Glam)	Goraya; Bissue; Shakqueel Burthwright; Malik Johnson	1K	2:40
20.	"Go to Hell"	Goraya; Schofield; Kudo	DannyBoyStyles; Rex Kudo	2:07
21.	"8 to a 4"	Goraya; Bhangal; Bacchus; S. Henry	Money Musik; Trouble Trouble; Frost	2:45
22.	"Never Know"	Goraya; Bhangal; Bacchus	Nav; Trouble Trouble; Money Musik	4:01
23.	"OK" (featuring Lil Durk)	Goraya; Banks; Bhangal; S. Henry	Money Musik; Frost	2:49
24.	"Athlete"	Goraya; Bhangal; Bacchus; Schofield; S. Henry	Nav; Money Musik; Trouble Trouble; Frost; DannyBoyStyles	3:01
Total length:				70:39

Notes

- ^{^[a]} signifies a co-producer
- ^{^[b]} signifies an additional producer
- ^{^[c]} signifies an uncredited co-producer
- "Go to Hell", "8 to a 4", "Never Know", "OK" (featuring Lil Durk), and "Athlete" were originally from Nav's Brown Boy EP, that his manager Cash leaked eight days before the album's release.

== Personnel ==
All programming and keyboards are credited to the producers of each track, except where noted.

Musicians

- WondaGurl – keyboards (track 2), programming (track 2)
- Money Musik – keyboards (track 3, 5, 7–9, 11–15, 21–24), programming (track 3, 5, 7–9, 11–15, 21–24)
- London on da Track – keyboards (track 4), programming (track 4)
- Mixx – keyboards (track 10), programming (track 10)
- Pro Logic – programming (track 16)
- Austin Powerz – programming (track 16)
- Wheezy – programming (track 1)
- Frost -keyboards (track 5, 7, 11, 14, 21, 23-24) programming (track 5, 7, 11, 14, 21, 23-24)
- Mike Michael – keyboards (all tracks)

Technical

- Pro Logic – mixing (all tracks), engineer (track 16)
- Trouble Trouble – engineer (tracks 2, 3, 7, 14, 17)
- Shin Kamiyama – engineer (tracks 4, 5, 8, 9, 12, 18)
- AlexOnWeed – engineer (track 19)
- Ethan Stevens – engineer (track 20)
- Mixx – engineer (track 10)
- Chemist – engineer (track 24)
- Chris Athens – mastering (all tracks)

== Charts ==
=== Weekly charts ===
Chart (2019)	Peak position
Belgian Albums (Ultratop Flanders)	76
Canadian Albums (Billboard)	1
Dutch Albums (Album Top 100)	20
French Albums (SNEP)	112
Irish Albums (IRMA)	79
Lithuanian Albums (AGATA)	64
New Zealand Albums (RMNZ)	36
Norwegian Albums (VG-lista)	30
Swedish Albums (Sverigetopplistan)	54
UK Albums (Official Charts)	26
US Billboard 200	1
US Top R&B/Hip-Hop Albums (Billboard)	1

=== Year-end charts ===
Chart (2019)	Position
Canadian Albums (Billboard)	41
US Billboard 200	108
US Top R&B/Hip-Hop Albums (Billboard)	53

== Certifications ==
Region	Certification	Certified units/sales
Canada (Music Canada)	Platinum	80,000^{‡}
United States (RIAA)	Gold	500,000^{‡}
^{‡} Sales+streaming figures based on certification alone.
