= Lately (Nav song) =

2023 single by Nav

Single by Nav
- Released: February 10, 2023
- Length: 3:51
- Label: XO; Republic
- Songwriter: Navraj Goraya
- Producer: Nav

Nav singles chronology
"Double Faces" (2023)	"Lately" (2023)	"Calling" (2023)

Lyric video
- "Lately" on YouTube

"Lately" is a song by Canadian rapper Nav. It was released through XO and Republic Records as the lead single from his unreleased third commercial mixtape, Nav2, on February 10, 2023. Written and produced by Nav, the song was mixed by Ethan Stevens, mastered by Joe LaPorta, and engineered by Rodrigo Barahona. It debuted and peaked at number 100 on the Canadian Hot 100.

== Composition and lyrics ==
Over an atmospheric instrumental, Nav expresses his desire to be alone and tune out the outside noise. A slow song, based on organ-led production, it contains a light instrumental that accompanies Nav as he expresses his emotions.

== Charts ==
Chart performance for "Lately"
Chart (2022)	Peak position
Canada Hot 100 (Billboard)	100
