= Some Way =

2017 debut single by Nav featuring the Weeknd

Single by Nav featuring the Weeknd

from the album Nav
- Released: February 15, 2017
- Length: 2:58
- Label: XO; Republic
- Songwriters: Navraj Goraya; Abel Tesfaye
- Producer: Nav

Nav singles chronology
"Re Up" (2017)	"Some Way" (2017)	"Myself" (2017)

The Weeknd singles chronology
"Party Monster" / "I Feel It Coming" (2016)	"Some Way" (2017)	"Lust for Life" (2017)

Music video
- "Some Way" on YouTube

"Some Way" is the debut commercial single by Canadian rapper and singer Nav featuring fellow Canadian singer-songwriter the Weeknd. Written by both and produced solely by the former, it was released as the lead single from his self-titled debut mixtape on February 15, 2017 through the latter's XO and Republic Records.

== Music video ==
The music video for "Some Way" was released on March 3, 2017, on Nav's Vevo account and was directed by RJ Sanchez. As of November 2024, the video has surpassed over 78 million views.

== Controversy ==
The song gained traction due to the content of the Weeknd's lyrics, which were widely interpreted as being aimed at singer Justin Bieber.

== Charts ==
Chart (2017)	Peak position
Australia Urban (ARIA)	19
Canada Hot 100 (Billboard)	31
US Bubbling Under Hot 100 (Billboard)	1
US Hot R&B/Hip-Hop Songs (Billboard)	38

== Certifications ==
Region	Certification	Certified units/sales
Canada (Music Canada)	4× Platinum	320,000^{‡}
New Zealand (RMNZ)	Gold	15,000^{‡}
United Kingdom (BPI)	Silver	200,000^{‡}
United States (RIAA)	2× Platinum	2,000,000^{‡}
^{‡} Sales+streaming figures based on certification alone.

== Release history ==
Region	Date	Format	Label(s)	Ref.
Various	February 16, 2017 (Note: Release as a single.)	Digital download	XO; Republic	
