= 88Camino =

Canadian rapper, singer, and songwriter

- Also known as: Camino; Mino; Mino Threat; Mino Ranger; Drew Howard
- Born: Shakqueel Malcolm De'shon Burthwright; June 14, 1992 (age 34); Toronto, Ontario, Canada
- Genres: Hip hop; trap
- Occupations: Singer; rapper; songwriter
- Instrument: Vocals
- Years active: 2009–present
- Labels: XO (former); Republic (former)
- Formerly of: 88Glam

Shakqueel Malcolm De'shon Burthwright (born June 14, 1992), known professionally as 88Camino, is a Canadian hip-hop singer, rapper and songwriter. He was formerly signed to Canadian singer-songwriter the Weeknd's record label, XO and Republic Records, under the hip hop duo 88Glam with his friend, fellow Canadian singer Derek Wise.

== Early life ==
Shakqueel Malcolm De'shon Burthwright was born in the Scarborough region of Toronto on June 14, 1992, to Debbie Howard and Peter Burthwright. When he was eight years old, he moved with his mother to Tulsa, Oklahoma, in the United States, where he stayed until Grade 10 before returning to Canada, residing in Ajax. When he turned 16, he started recording music in his closet, after previously being inspired by American rappers like Lil Wayne.

== Career ==
=== 2009–2012: Career beginnings ===
Around 2009, he started posting his music online under the name "Drew Howard", a combination of his middle name and his mother's maiden name. His music caught the attention of an artist manager, who later connected him with Filipino-Canadian rapper Russell, who was known as D-Pryde at the time. This helped him gain his initial spotlight in the Toronto music scene, although he later split ways in search of a new sound, making a departure of the bubblegum rap music he was creating at the time.

=== 2012–2017: Get Home Safe ===
In the summer of 2012, he joined a group named "Get Home Safe" with fellow Canadian rappers Derek Wise and Jazz Cartier. He would also start using the moniker "88Camino" as a nickname. They would frequently make cameo appearances in music videos that feature The Weeknd, most notably in "King of the Fall" and "Reminder".

After the disbandment of the group, Camino and Wise remained in touch and collaborated frequently and previously worked together on his single "Anuva Wun" and "I Can Tell" from Wise's 2017 debut album Inglorious. Camino and Wise began teasing their collaborative project during the summer of 2017.

=== 2017–present: 88Glam ===
On November 1, 2017, Billboard premiered the music video for "12" from a newly formed duo with Wise named 88Glam, with him permanently rebranding himself as "88Camino". The music video also featured a cameo appearance by The Weeknd. 88Glam, the self-titled debut project by 88Glam was released on November 7, 2017.

88Glam released 88Glam Reloaded on April 20, 2018, after officially signing to XO and Republic Records. On November 15, 2018, 88Glam released their second album 88Glam2, through XO and Republic.

On March 5, 2020, revealed an upcoming album titled Close to Heaven Far from God which was set to be released on April 17, 2020, through XO and Republic. However, the album has been delayed due to 88Glam's departure from the labels. 88Glam, instead, released a new mixtape independently titled New Mania on June 26, 2020. Close to Heaven Far from God was finally released independently on August 26, 2022, after more than two years of teasing, with major changes from the original tracklist.

== Solo discography ==
=== Extended plays ===
List of extended plays, with selected details
Title	Details
88Camino.com (as Drew Howard)	Released: August 25, 2015; Label: Self-released; Format: Digital download, streaming
Music to Soothe the Savage Youth (as Drew Howard; with Birthday Boy)	Released: October 26, 2015; Label: Self-released; Format: Digital download, streaming
Social Suicide (as Drew Howard)	Released: March 30, 2016; Label: Self-released; Format: Digital download, streaming

=== Singles ===
==== As lead artist ====
List of singles as lead artist
Title	Year	Album
"Uncle Tona" (as Drew Howard)	2014	non-album single
"You're Not My Mans" (as Drew Howard)	2015	88Camino.com
"Anuva Wun" (as Drew Howard; featuring Derek Wise)	2016	non-album single

==== As featured artist ====
List of singles as featured artist, showing year released and album name
Title	Year	Artist(s)	Album
"I Can Tell" (as Drew Howard)	2017	Derek Wise	Inglorious

=== Music videos ===
List of music videos, showing year released, with directors
Title	Year	Director(s)	Notes
"Uncle Tona"	2014	Tristan C-M	Premiered on Complex.
"You're Not My Mans"	2016		

=== With 88Glam ===
- 88Glam (2017; re-released in 2018)
- 88Glam2 (2018)
- New Mania (2020)
- Heaven Can Wait (2021)
- Close to Heaven Far from God (2022)

== See also ==
- XO
