= 88Glam =

Canadian hip hop duo

- Origin: Toronto, Ontario, Canada
- Genres: Hip hop; trap
- Years active: 2017–2022
- Labels: XO; Republic (former)
- Past members: 88Camino; Derek Wise

88Glam was a Canadian hip hop duo that formed in 2017 by Shakqueel "88Camino" Burthwright and Derek "Wise" Bissue. They were formerly signed to XO and Republic Records before getting dropped in 2020 and frequently collaborated with Nav, their now-former labelmate from the two labels.

== Career ==
Prior to the formation of 88Glam and following the disband of their former group named "Get Home Safe" with Jazz Cartier, both Derek Wise and 88Camino, who was formerly known as Drew Howard, had been releasing music separately. Wise and Camino remained in touch and collaborated frequently and previously worked together on the tracks "Anuva Wun" as a single by Camino and "I Can Tell" from Wise's 2017 debut album Inglorious. Wise and Camino began teasing their collaborative project during the summer of 2017. The duo introduced the name "88Glam" on November 1, 2017, premiering their first music video "12" via Billboard which featured a cameo from the Weeknd. This was followed by the release of another music video for "Bali", which features Nav, and the release of their self-titled debut mixtape 88Glam on November 7, 2017.

In 2018, 88Glam officially signed to XO and Republic Records. On April 20, 2018, 88Glam was re-released as 88Glam Reloaded through XO and Republic, with four new tracks including a remix with 2 Chainz.

On November 8, 2018, 88Glam released a new single titled "Lil Boat" from an upcoming album titled 88Glam2. On November 15, 2018, 88Glam2 was released under XO Records and Republic Records with features from Nav and Gunna. On March 26, 2019, 88Glam was featured on Nav's song titled "Rack in My Sleep" from the deluxe edition of his second studio album, Bad Habits, which was released four days before. On March 5, 2020, 88Glam released "Swim" and revealed an upcoming album titled Close to Heaven Far from God which would be released on April 17, 2020. However, in April 2020, rumors began circulating that the duo had broken up and dropped from XO and Republic. This was followed by an announcement from 88Glam that their upcoming album Close to Heaven Far from God would be delayed. In response, 88Camino wrote on Twitter: "no 88GLAM isn't breaking up." On June 19, 2020, 88Glam announced a new mixtape titled New Mania which would be released independently on June 26, 2020. In an interview with Complex, following the release of New Mania, 88Glam confirmed their departure from XO and Republic, citing independence. On November 6, 2020, 88Glam released a new single titled "East to West", with 6ixBuzz Entertainment through Warner Music Canada. Close to Heaven Far from God was released independently on August 26, 2022.

== Discography ==
=== Studio albums ===
List of studio albums, with selected details
Title	Album details	Peak chart positions
Title	Album details	CAN
88Glam2	Released: November 16, 2018 (initial) April 5, 2019 (2.5); Label: XO, Republic; Format: Digital download, streaming	33
Close to Heaven Far from God	Released: August 26, 2022; Label: Self-released; Format: Digital download, streaming	—
"—" denotes a recording that did not chart or was not released in that territory.

=== Mixtapes ===
List of mixtapes, with selected details
Title	Album details	Peak chart positions
Title	Album details	CAN
88Glam	Released: November 16, 2017 (initial) April 20, 2018 (re-released); Label: Self-released (initial) XO, Republic (re-released); Format: Digital download, streaming	95
New Mania	Released: June 26, 2020; Label: Self-released; Format: Digital download, streaming	—
"—" denotes a recording that did not chart or was not released in that territory.

=== Extended plays ===
List of extended plays, with selected details
Title	Album details
Heaven Can Wait	Released: May 28, 2021; Label: Self-released; Format: Digital download, streaming

=== Singles ===
List of singles with selected chart positions
Title	Year	Peak chart positions	Certifications	Album
Title	Year	CAN	Certifications	Album
"12"	2017	—		88Glam
"Bali" (featuring Nav)	2017	62	MC: Platinum	88Glam
"Big Tymers"	2017	—		88Glam
"Lil Boat"	2018	—	MC: Platinum	88Glam2
"Kitchen Witch"	2018	—		88Glam2
"It's a Flex" (featuring Nav)	2019	—		88Glam2
"Bankroll" (featuring Lil Keed)	2019	—		Non-album singles
"Swim"	2020	—		Non-album singles
"Dance for Me"	2020	—		New Mania
"East to West" (with 6ixBuzz)	2020	—		Non-album singles
"Urgent Messages" (with 6ixBuzz)	2021	—		Non-album singles
"Five Stars"	2021	—		Heaven Can Wait
"Want To"	2022	—		Close to Heaven Far from God
"Ziploc"	2022	—		Close to Heaven Far from God
"Happy Belated"	2022	—		Close to Heaven Far from God
"Freak Hoe"	2024	—		Non-album singles
"—" denotes a recording that did not chart or was not released in that territory.

=== Guest appearance ===
Title	Year	Album
"Rack in My Sleep" (Nav featuring 88Glam)	2019	Bad Habits (Deluxe)

== Awards and nominations ==
Year	Awards	Category	Nominee / work	Result
2019	Juno Award	Breakthrough Group of the Year	88Glam	Nominated
2019	Juno Award	Rap Recording of the Year	88Glam Reloaded	Nominated
2020	Juno Award	Group of the Year	88Glam	Nominated
2020	Juno Award	Rap Recording of the Year	88Glam2	Nominated
