= Nav (mixtape) =

Mixtape by Nav
- Released: February 24, 2017
- Length: 33:52
- Labels: XO; Republic
- Producers: Nav; DannyBoyStyles; Frost; Metro Boomin; Rex Kudo

Nav chronology
The Introduction (2016)	Nav (2017)	Perfect Timing (2017)

Singles from Nav
- 1. "Some Way" Released: February 16, 2017; 2. "Myself" Released: April 11, 2017

Professional ratings
Aggregate scores
Source	Rating
Metacritic	45/100
Review scores
Source	Rating
Allmusic	2.5/5 stars
Exclaim!	5/10
NOW Magazine	2/5 stars
RapReviews.com	3.5/10
Sputnikmusic	2.1/5 stars

Nav is the debut commercial mixtape by Canadian rapper and record producer Nav. It was released through XO and Republic Records on February 24, 2017. The mixtape features a sole guest appearance from Canadian singer-songwriter and XO label boss the Weeknd, who appears on the lead single of the project, "Some Way". Nav handled most of the production himself, with some tracks featuring co-production from other record producers such as Metro Boomin, Rex Kudo, Frost, and DannyBoyStyles. The mixtape received generally mixed to negative reviews from critics, with a 42% score on Metacritic.

== Background ==
On February 16, 2017, Nav officially announced that he signed a deal to the Weeknd's record label XO and Republic Records. Prior to this, he made appearances in music videos for The Weeknd; as well as fellow XO signee Belly sparking rumours that he is also been signed to XO. Nav also announced that he would be releasing the mixtape on February 24, 2017. Several tracks on the mixtape had already been released on Nav's SoundCloud account prior to the release, including "Myself" and "Up"; both of these songs garnered millions of plays on the platform. On February 22, 2017, Nav revealed the mixtape's track listing on his Instagram account.

== Singles ==
The debut and lead single, called "Some Way" featuring Canadian singer-songwriter the Weeknd, was released as a digital download on February 25, 2017. The song gained traction due to the content of the Weeknd's lyrics, which were widely interpreted as being aimed at prepped Canadian singer-songwriter Justin Bieber, regarding their ongoing feud.

"Myself" was originally posted to SoundCloud on January 12, 2016, but not to streaming services as a single. It was serviced to rhythmic radio on April 11, 2017 as the second single.

Though not released as singles, "Ten Toes Down (TTD)" and "Up" were previously released on SoundCloud in 2015 and 2016, respectively. A deleted 2014 track titled "She Know", while not included on the album, is heavily sampled on "Interlude".

== Track listing ==
No.	Title	Writer(s)	Producer(s)	Length
1.	"Myself"	Navraj Goraya	Nav	3:46
2.	"Nav"	Goraya; Danny Schofield	Nav; DannyBoyStyles	3:02
3.	"My Mind"	Goraya	Nav	2:41
4.	"Good for It"	Goraya; Sugar-Ray Henry	Nav; Frost	2:39
5.	"Lonely"	Goraya; Masamune Kudo	Nav; Rex Kudo	3:35
6.	"Up"	Goraya; Leland Wayne	Nav; Metro Boomin	3:20
7.	"Interlude"	Goraya	Nav	1:56
8.	"Sleep"	Goraya	Nav	3:06
9.	"Mariah"	Goraya; Kudo	Nav; Rex Kudo	2:42
10.	"Some Way" (featuring the Weeknd)	Goraya; Abel Tesfaye	Nav	2:58
11.	"TTD"	Goraya	Nav	4:02
Total length:				33:52

Notes

- "Nav" is stylized in all caps like the rapper's name.

== Charts ==
=== Weekly charts ===
Chart (2017)	Peak position
Canadian Albums (Billboard)	4
New Zealand Heatseekers Albums (RMNZ)	1
US Billboard 200	24
US Top R&B/Hip-Hop Albums (Billboard)	12

=== Year-end charts ===
Chart (2017	Position
US Billboard 200	131
US Top R&B/Hip-Hop Albums (Billboard)	60

== Certifications ==
Region	Certification	Certified units/sales
Canada (Music Canada)	Platinum	80,000^{‡}
United States (RIAA)	Gold	500,000^{‡}
^{‡} Sales+streaming figures based on certification alone.
