= Derek Wise =

Canadian rapper, singer, and songwriter

- Also known as: Ryan Glamsling
- Born: Derek Fifi Bissue; December 11, 1992 (age 33); Toronto, Ontario, Canada
- Genres: Hip hop; trap
- Occupations: Singer; rapper; songwriter
- Instrument: Vocals
- Years active: 2012–present
- Labels: XO (former); Republic (former)
- Formerly of: 88Glam

Derek Fifi "Wise" Bissue (born December 11, 1992) is a Canadian hip-hop singer, rapper and songwriter. He was formerly signed to Canadian singer-songwriter the Weeknd's record label, XO and Republic Records, under the hip hop duo 88Glam with his friend, fellow Canadian singer 88Camino.

== Early life ==
Wise was born in Toronto on December 11, 1992. He grew up listening to American rappers like Juvenile, Trick Daddy, Stack Bundles, Max B, and LL Cool J. By the age of 20, Wise had moved around Toronto 14 times.

== Career ==
=== 2012–2016: Vacay and Inglorious ===
In October 2012, Wise released Vacay, his debut mixtape with 16 tracks. The mixtape premiered on DatPiff.

After a year of releasing multiple singles and music videos in 2016, Wise announced his debut album Inglorious on January 21, 2017. Inglorious was released on January 30, 2017.

On April 21, 2017, Wise performed at the 2017 Canadian Music Week festival, supporting Bronx artist A Boogie wit da Hoodie.

Wise frequently makes cameo appearances in music videos that feature The Weeknd, most notably in "King of the Fall" and "Reminder".

=== 2017–present: 88Glam ===
On November 1, 2017, Billboard premiered the music video for "12" from the newly formed duo 88Glam, consisting of Wise and frequent collaborator 88Camino. The music video also featured a cameo appearance by The Weeknd. 88Glam, the self-titled debut project by 88Glam was released on November 7, 2017.

88Glam released 88Glam Reloaded on April 20, 2018, after officially signing to XO and Republic Records. On November 15, 2018, 88Glam released their second album 88Glam2, through XO and Republic.

On March 5, 2020, revealed an upcoming album titled Close to Heaven Far from God which was set to be released on April 17, 2020, through XO and Republic. However, the album has been delayed due to 88Glam's departure from the labels. 88Glam instead released a mixtape independently titled New Mania on June 26, 2020. Close to Heaven Far from God was finally released independently on August 26, 2022, after more than two years of teasing, with major changes from the original tracklist.

=== Legal issues ===
On December 11, 2013, Wise was arrested on charges of human trafficking following allegations from a 21-year-old woman. The charges faced by Bissue include trafficking in persons, uttering threats of death and bodily harm, two counts of overcoming resistance by choking, robbery, weapons charges, and three counts of theft under $5,000. Shortly after the charges were dropped, Wise released a track titled "Had to Wake Up" on June 27, 2016, to address the allegations.

== Solo discography ==
=== Studio albums ===
List of solo studio albums, with selected details
Title	Details
Inglorious	Released: January 30, 2017; Label: Self-released; Format: Digital download, streaming

=== Mixtapes ===
List of mixtapes, with selected details
Title	Details
Vacay	Released: October 31, 2012; Label: Self-released; Format: Digital download, streaming

=== Singles ===
==== As lead artist ====
List of singles as lead artist
Title	Year	Album
"Lay Low"	2015	non-album single
"How Would You Feel?"	2015	non-album single
"Opinions"	2016	non-album single
"Glam"	2016	non-album single
"Free Up"	2016	non-album single
"When We See You"	2016	non-album single
"Sad $1's"	2016	non-album single
"Ready 2 Go"	2016	non-album single
"Drop Life"	2016	non-album single
"Had to Wake Up"	2016	Inglorious
"Ryan Glamsling"	2016	non-album single
"Beyond the Pines"	2016	non-album single
"Get It Myself"	2017	non-album single
"Disconnected"	2017	Inglorious
"Jamal"	2017	Inglorious

==== As featured artist ====
List of singles as featured artist, showing year released and album name
Title	Year	Artist(s)	Album
"Anuva Wun"	2016	88Camino (as Drew Howard)	non-album single
"Cutty"	2016	Quincy Got Rich	non-album single
"Pull Up"	2017	Sneazzy	Dieu Bénisse Supersound, saison 2

=== Music videos ===
List of music videos, showing year released, with directors
Title	Year	Director(s)	Notes
"Awkward"	2014	Derek Wise	
"Kenzo"	2014	Derek Wise	
"Runnin' It"	2016	Derek Wise	
"Lay Low"	2016	Derek Wise	
"Beyond the Pines"	2016	Derek Wise	
"Ryan Glamsling"	2016	Andy Hines	
"Get It Myself"	2017	Zac Facts	
"Disconnected"	2017	Kid. Studio	Premiered on Much.
"Jamal"	2017	RJ Sanchez	Premiered on Much.

=== With 88Glam ===
- 88Glam (2017; re-released in 2018)
- 88Glam2 (2018)
- New Mania (2020)
- Heaven Can Wait (2021)
- Close to Heaven Far from God (2022)

== Awards and nominations ==
Year	Awards	Category	Nominated work	Result
2017	iHeartRadio Much Music Video Awards	Best Hip Hop Video	Disconnected	Nominated

== See also ==
- XO
