= King of the Fall Tour =

2014 concert tour by the Weeknd

The King of the Fall Tour
- Continental tour by the Weeknd
- Promotional tour poster
- Location: North America
- Start date: September 19, 2014
- End date: October 11, 2014
- No. of shows: 5
- Supporting acts: Schoolboy Q; Jhené Aiko
- Attendance: 63,530
- Box office: $3,263,689

the Weeknd concert chronology
- The Kiss Land Fall Tour (2013); King of the Fall Tour (2014); The Madness Fall Tour (2015)

The King of the Fall Tour was the third concert tour by the Canadian singer the Weeknd, and was promoted with the songs "King of the Fall" and "Often". The tour began on September 19, 2014, in Brooklyn at the Barclays Center and concluded on October 11, 2014, in San Francisco at the Bill Graham Civic Auditorium.

== Set list ==
This set list is representative of the show on September 14, 2014, at the Barclays Center in Brooklyn. It is not representative of all concerts for the duration of the tour.

1. "Enemy"
2. "What You Need"
3. "Professional"
4. "Adaptation"
5. "Love in the Sky"
6. "Gone"
7. "Crew Love"
8. "The Birds, Pt. 1"
9. "Belong to the World"
10. "Wanderlust"
11. "King of the Fall"
12. "Drunk in Love"
13. "The Morning"
14. "Remember You"
15. "The Zone"
16. "High for This"
17. "The Party & the After Party"
18. "Loft Music"
19. "The Knowing"
20. "Twenty Eight"
21. "House of Balloons / Glass Table Girls"
22. "Wicked Games"

Encore

23. "Or Nah"
24. "Often"

== Tour dates ==
List of concerts, showing date, city, country, venue, opening acts, attendance, and gross revenue
Date	City	Country	Venue	Opening acts	Attendance	Revenue
September 19, 2014	Brooklyn	United States	Barclays Center	ScHoolboy Q Jhené Aiko	13,763 / 13,763	$784,339
September 21, 2014	Toronto	Canada	Molson Canadian Amphitheatre	ScHoolboy Q Jhené Aiko	15,500 / 15,895	$631,568
October 9, 2014	Los Angeles	United States	Hollywood Bowl	ScHoolboy Q Jhené Aiko	16,989 / 16,989	$992,004
October 10, 2014	San Francisco	United States	Bill Graham Civic Auditorium	ScHoolboy Q Jhené Aiko	17,278 / 17,278	$855,778
October 11, 2014	San Francisco	United States	Bill Graham Civic Auditorium	ScHoolboy Q Jhené Aiko	17,278 / 17,278	$855,778
Total					63,530 / 63,925	$3,263,689
