= Toronto sound (hip-hop) =

Style of hip hop and R&B

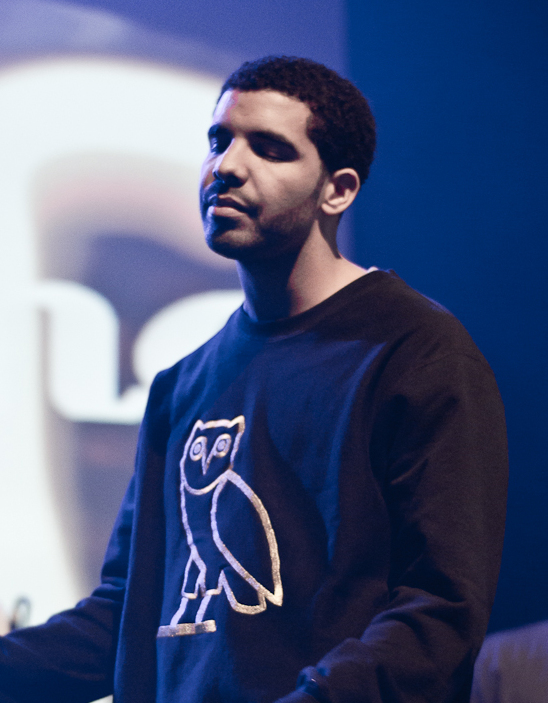
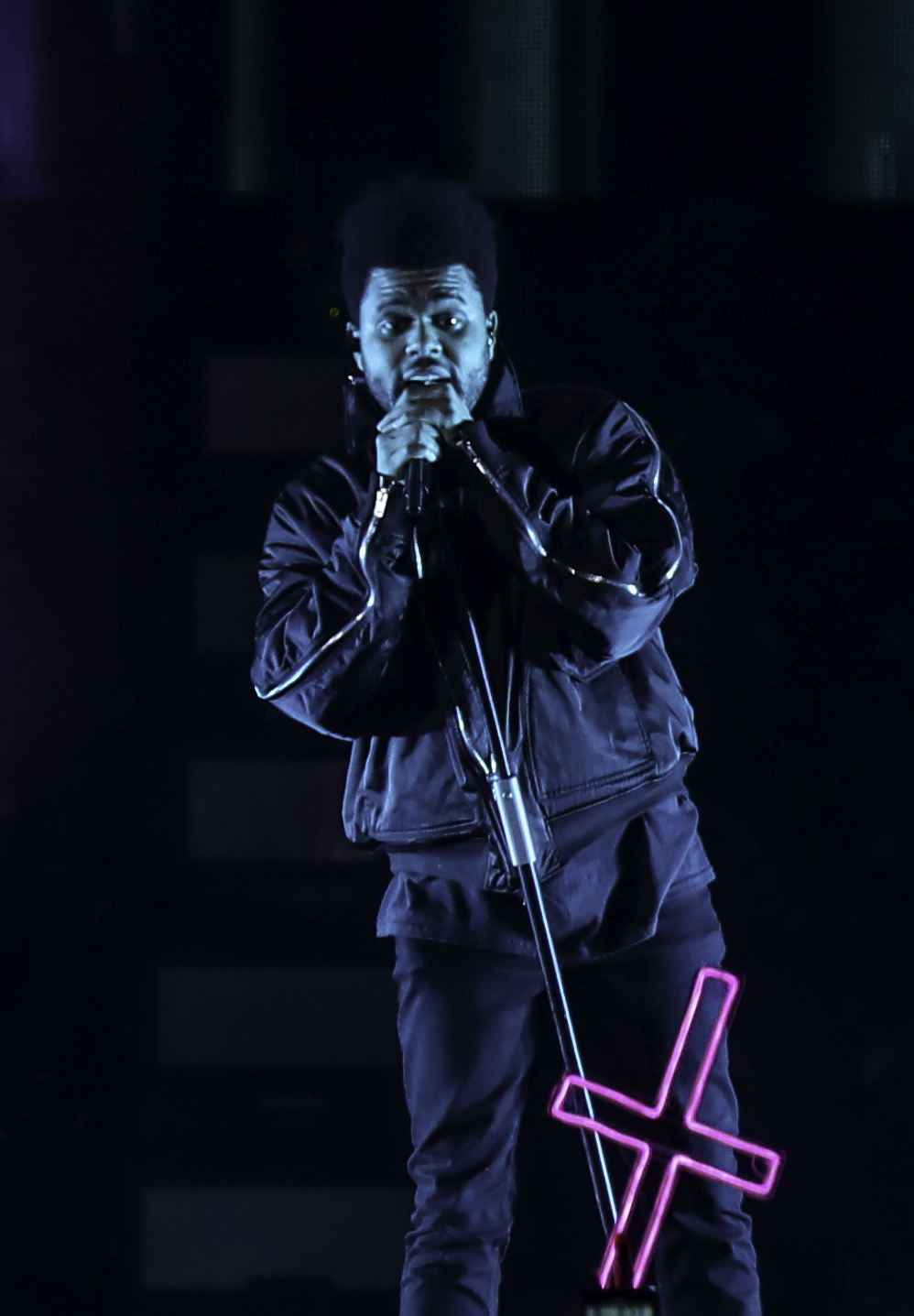
Two Toronto sound artists, Drake and the Weeknd, performing respectively in 2011 and 2018.

The Toronto sound (sometimes referred to as the 6 Sound or new Toronto sound) refers to a style of hip hop and R&B that emerged from Toronto in the late 2000s and early 2010s. Notable for its moody, atmospheric production techniques and its often reflective and hedonistic lyrical themes, it was popularized by artists like Drake, The Weeknd, PARTYNEXTDOOR, Tory Lanez, and NAV, along with producers such as Noah "40" Shebib, Boi-1da, Frank Dukes, DaHeala, Nineteen85, Doc McKinney, Cirkut, Illangelo, Vinlyz, Eric Dingus, and Zodiac, among others. The Toronto sound significantly shaped Toronto's 21st-century musical identity as a major global music exporter. Its elements are ubiquitous with pop music in the 2020s. Over 100 million records with Toronto sound elements have been sold globally.

== History ==
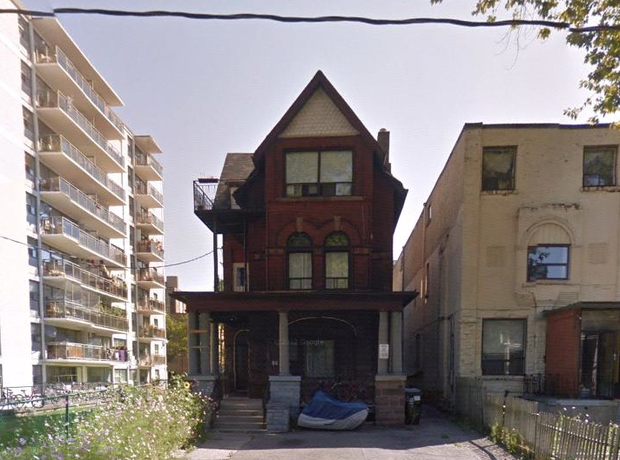
The Weeknd's mixtape House of Balloons is named after a residence he had lived in the Parkdale neighborhood of Toronto, Canada.

=== Beginnings ===
Drake's So Far Gone (2009), Thank Me Later (2010) and Take Care (2011) and The Weeknd's trio of mixtapes House of Balloons, Thursday and Echoes of Silence (2011) played pivotal roles in popularizing this sound. So Far Gone introduced a blend of rap and R&B with introspective lyrics and atmospheric production, and Take Care further refined this style, with Drake collaborating with The Weeknd on several songs. The Weeknd's early mixtapes complemented this evolution with their dark, ethereal production. Together, these releases defined the Toronto sound, influencing global music trends and artists to integrate its elements into their own work.

The city's cultural diversity, particularly its Caribbean and African communities, has also shaped the sound, incorporating elements of dancehall, reggae, afrobeat and downtempo. This fusion, combined with a minimalist production style that emphasizes atmosphere over complexity, laid the foundation of its identity.

=== Rise in popularity internationally ===
Drake's Thank Me Later album charted at number 1 on the Billboard 200. It spawned well-performing singles which introduced a broader American audience to this emerging subgenre of alternative hip hop. The Weeknd's House of Balloons mixtape was critically acclaimed and covered by several music publications, further introducing the Toronto sound to different audiences.

The production on ‘Climax’ lends itself to ‘House of Balloons’ era @theweeknd...When I heard those early [Weeknd] records they blew my mind — soulful in their silences, and a spacey iconic voice that felt uniquely internet. The idea of R&B having dark edges was what I wanted to bring to @usher.

— Diplo, Variety Magazine

Early Toronto sound records by non-Toronto-born artists to chart on the Billboard Hot 100 include Lil Wayne's "I'm Single" and Trey Songz' "Successful", both of which were produced by 40. "Successful" appeared on both Trey Songz' Ready and Drake's So Far Gone, released in 2009.

Another notable early Toronto sound records to crack the Billboard Hot 100 by non-Toronto-born artists include Usher's "Climax" produced by Diplo which went 3× platinum in the United States and won a Grammy Award.

An acceleration of artists either influenced by or incorporating the Toronto sound began to emerge between 2013 and 2016. These included Torontonians Tory Lanez, Nav and Majid Jordan and Americans Bryson Tiller and 6lack.

== Characteristics ==
He [Noah "40" Shebib] had a unique way of working with space and vocals. He would filter the highs off the drums to make them more muffled-sounding, so you could really hear Drake cut through. So there was nothing competing with the vocals, they would just sit on top of it...That’s one of the things he brought that influenced the whole music business.

— Mike Dean, Rolling Stone

=== Production ===
The Toronto sound is characterized by its unique production mechanics, which include several key techniques that contribute to its moody and atmospheric qualities. A hallmark of this sound is the use of lo-fi textures and low-pass filters. Lo-fi textures introduce a vintage quality by incorporating subtle background noise and imperfections, which add warmth and depth. Low-pass filters attenuate high frequencies, creating a muffled effect that enhances the introspective and immersive nature of the music. Deep, resonant bass lines anchor the tracks, complemented by minimalistic beats that maintain focus on the core elements. Reverb is extensively used to create a spacious, lush sound, while ambient textures and atmospheric sounds add to the overall moodiness. Additionally, beat switches are a prominent feature, where shifts in rhythm or beat structure occur within a track. A clear example of this is Drake's "0 to 100 / The Catch Up", where a distinct beat transition is heard at the record's 2:40 timestamp mark until its end.

Prominent atmospheric synths with slowed, downtempo elements are evident on records like "Marvins Room", "Crew Love", "The Zone", "King of the Fall", and Days in the East. The sparse instrumental arrangements, with minimal hi-hats, kick drums, and snare hits, contributes to a mood that is often compelling or disconcerting, depending on the artist's intent—a novelty for rap and R&B in the late 2000s and early 2010s.
