= The Madness Fall Tour =

2015 concert tour by the Weeknd

- Continental tour by The Weeknd
- Promotional tour poster
- Location: North America
- Associated album: Beauty Behind the Madness
- Start date: November 3, 2015
- End date: December 19, 2015
- Legs: 1
- No. of shows: 24
- Supporting acts: Banks; Travis Scott; Halsey
- Attendance: 318,104
- Box office: $24.3 million ($32.24 million in 2024 dollars)

The Weeknd concert chronology
- King of the Fall Tour (2014); The Madness Fall Tour (2015); Starboy: Legend of the Fall Tour (2017)

The Madness Fall Tour was the fourth concert tour and first arena tour by Canadian singer the Weeknd, in support of his second studio album Beauty Behind the Madness (2015). The tour was announced on August 20, 2015, with 20 dates, and began on November 3, 2015, in Toronto at the Air Canada Centre and concluded on December 19, 2015, in Miami at the American Airlines Arena.

== Commercial reception ==
In January 2016, the tour placed at number 43 on Pollstar's "2015 Year-End Top 200 North American Tours" list, grossing $24.3 million from 23 shows with a total attendance of 318,104.

== Set list ==
This set list is representative of the show on November 16, 2015, in New York City. It is not representative of all concerts for the duration of the tour.

1. "Real Life"
2. "Losers"
3. "Acquainted"
4. "Often"
5. "High for This"
6. "The Party"
7. "King of the Fall"
8. "Crew Love"
9. "Or Nah" (remix)
10. "Professional"
11. "The Morning"
12. "House of Balloons / Glass Table Girls"
13. "Tell Your Friends"
14. "The Birds, Pt. 1″
15. "Shameless"
16. "Earned It"
17. "Dark Times"
18. "As You Are"
19. "Angel"
20. "D.D." (Michael Jackson cover) / "In the Night"
21. "Can't Feel My Face"
22. "Prisoner"
23. "The Hills"

Encore

1. "Wicked Games"

=== Notes ===
- Ed Sheeran joined onstage during the second show at the Air Canada Centre, performing "Dark Times" together.
- Lana Del Rey joined onstage during the second show at The Forum, performing "Prisoner" together.

== Shows ==
List of concerts, showing datp, city, country, venue, opening act, tickets sold, number of available tickets and amount of gross revenue
Date	City	Country	Venue	Opening act	Attendance	Revenue
November 3, 2015	Toronto	Canada	Air Canada Centre	Banks; Travis Scott	33,036 / 33,036	$2,332,006
November 5, 2015	Toronto	Canada	Air Canada Centre	Banks; Travis Scott	33,036 / 33,036	$2,332,006
November 6, 2015	Chicago	United States	United Center	Banks; Travis Scott	—N/a	—N/a
November 7, 2015	Auburn Hills	United States	The Palace of Auburn Hills	Banks; Travis Scott	15,184 / 15,184	$1,099,963
November 11, 2015	Newark	United States	Prudential Center	Banks; Travis Scott	12,988 / 12,988	$934,807
November 12, 2015	Worcester	United States	DCU Center	Banks; Travis Scott	11,256 / 11,256	$793,495
November 14, 2015	Uncasville	United States	Mohegan Sun Arena	Banks; Travis Scott	6,752 / 6,752	$627,320
November 15, 2015	Washington, D.C.	United States	Verizon Center	Banks; Travis Scott	14,972 / 14,972	$1,174,584
November 16, 2015	New York City	United States	Madison Square Garden	Banks; Travis Scott	14,817 / 14,817	$1,299,553
November 18, 2015	Brooklyn	United States	Barclays Center	Banks; Travis Scott	30,420 / 30,420	$2,362,466
November 19, 2015	Brooklyn	United States	Barclays Center	Banks; Travis Scott	30,420 / 30,420	$2,362,466
November 24, 2015	Montreal	Canada	Bell Centre	Travis Scott	16,863 / 16,863	$981,428
November 27, 2015	Winnipeg	Canada	Canada Life Centre	Halsey; Travis Scott	—N/a	—N/a
November 29, 2015	Calgary	Canada	Scotiabank Saddledome	Halsey; Travis Scott	—N/a	—N/a
November 30, 2015	Edmonton	Canada	Rexall Place	Halsey; Travis Scott	13,175 / 13,175	$ 807,330
December 2, 2015	Vancouver	Canada	Rogers Arena	Halsey; Travis Scott	—N/a	—N/a
December 5, 2015	Oakland	United States	Oracle Arena	Halsey; Travis Scott	14,680 / 14,680	$1,153,713
December 6, 2015	San Jose	United States	SAP Center	Halsey; Travis Scott	—N/a	—N/a
December 8, 2015	Inglewood	United States	The Forum	Halsey; Travis Scott	28,979 / 28,979	$2,861,328
December 9, 2015	Inglewood	United States	The Forum	Banks; Travis Scott	28,979 / 28,979	$2,861,328
December 13, 2015	Houston	United States	Toyota Center	Halsey; Travis Scott	—N/a	—N/a
December 15, 2015	Atlanta	United States	Philips Arena	Halsey; Travis Scott	13,164 / 13,164	$972,995
December 17, 2015	Tampa	United States	Amalie Arena	Travis Scott	14,435 / 14,435	$933,095
December 19, 2015	Miami	United States	American Airlines Arena	Travis Scott	14,500 / 14,500	$1,217,265
Total					255,221 / 255,221(100%)	$19,551,348
