= Rolling Stone (The Weeknd song) =

Promotional single by the Weeknd

from the album Thursday and Trilogy
- Released: May 25, 2011
- Length: 3:50
- Label: XO
- Songwriters: Abel Tesfaye; Martin McKinney; Carlo Montagnese
- Producers: Doc McKinney; Carlo Montagnese

Music video
- "Rolling Stone (Explicit)" on YouTube

"Rolling Stone" is a song by the Canadian singer-songwriter the Weeknd, from his second mixtape, Thursday (2011). It was released on May 25, 2011, as the mixtape's first promotional single. In 2012, the song was remastered and released commercially on the Weeknd's compilation album, Trilogy (2012). It was written by the Weeknd alongside producers Doc McKinney and Illangelo.

== Background and release ==
Following the release of his 2011 mixtape, House of Balloons, the Weeknd revealed on social media that he was going to be releasing two more mixtapes throughout 2011, named Thursday and Echoes of Silence. Following this announcement, he released "Rolling Stone" on May 25, 2011, as the first promotional single for Thursday.

== Composition and lyrics ==
Highsnobiety wrote that "Rolling Stone" acts as an open letter to the Weeknd's fans, stating that the lyrics of the song are about his fear of wanting to grow as an artist, and hoping his fans follow him in his journey. Billboard wrote that the song is the Weeknd's own spin on the "rolling stone metaphor", likening it to his high and further stating that the word "rolling" could be slang for taking MDMA.

== Music video ==
On October 3, 2012, the Weeknd released a music video for "Rolling Stone" in promotion of his compilation album, Trilogy. The video was self-directed by the Weeknd, and features him being embraced from behind by a young woman, as the camera repeatedly fixes into the Weeknd's face and slowly zooms out. The visuals in the video are featured in the official cover art for Trilogy.

In a written letter, the Weeknd stated that the video was recorded in a dimly lit studio, and it represents two sides, the gloomy side of the room representing "the mainstream world" while the other side, which is more lit up, represents "the underground". He then said that the woman holding on in the video represents the viewer. As of 2025, the video is available to view on YouTube, and has received over 55 million views.

As part of the promotion campaign of his sixth studio album Hurry Up Tomorrow (2025), the song was used in a visual teaser published one week before the album's release, showing snippets of his previous and also upcoming music videos spanning from House of Balloons (2011) to Hurry Up Tomorrow.

== Live performance ==
The song was included on the set list of the Weeknd's first live concert at the Mod Club on July 24, 2011.

== Personnel ==
Credits adapted from the liner notes for Trilogy.

- Abel Tesfaye (The Weeknd) – lead vocals, additional production, songwriting/composition
- Carlo Montagnese (Illangelo) – production, songwriting, mixing, recording engineer
- Martin McKinney (Doc McKinney) – production, songwriting, recording engineer
- Matthew Acton – assistant recording engineer
