= Trilogy (The Weeknd album) =

2012 compilation album by the Weeknd

Compilation album by the Weeknd
- Released: November 13, 2012
- Studios: Dream House; Site Sound; Sterling Road (Toronto)
- Genre: Alternative R&B
- Length: 159:35
- Labels: XO; Republic
- Producers: Clams Casino; Doc McKinney; Dream Machine; DropxLife; Illangelo; Jeremy Rose; Rainer; The Weeknd

The Weeknd chronology
| Echoes of Silence (2011) | Trilogy (2012) | Kiss Land (2013) |

Singles from Trilogy
- 1. "Wicked Games" Released: October 22, 2012; 2. "Twenty Eight" Released: November 13, 2012; 3. "The Zone" Released: November 16, 2012

Trilogy is the major label debut of and first compilation album by Canadian singer-songwriter the Weeknd. It was released on November 13, 2012, through XO and Republic Records. It is composed of remixed and remastered versions of the songs contained in his 2011 mixtapes House of Balloons, Thursday and Echoes of Silence, and three previously unreleased songs, "Twenty Eight", "Valerie", and "Till Dawn (Here Comes the Sun)" were included as bonus tracks.

Trilogy received generally positive reviews from critics, who reinforced the previous acclaim of the mixtapes, although some found it indulgent. It was promoted with three singles and the Weeknd's concert tour during September to November 2012. The album charted at number five in Canada and number four in the United States.

== Background ==
In 2011, the Weeknd released a series of mixtapes—House of Balloons, Thursday and Echoes of Silence—and garnered both critical acclaim and a growing fan base. The mixtapes were principally recorded with producers Doc McKinney and Illangelo, at Dream House and Site Sound Studios in Toronto; additional sessions took place at Sterling Road Studios. The Weeknd released the mixtapes online as free digital downloads.

In September 2012, the Weeknd signed with Republic Records in a joint venture with his own imprint label XO. The mixtapes were subsequently remastered and compiled for Trilogy, along with three previously unreleased songs, "Twenty Eight", "Valerie", and "Till Dawn (Here Comes the Sun)", which were recorded at Liberty Studios in Toronto. The three songs were included as bonus tracks at the end of each of the compilation's discs.

To re-release the mixtapes' music for retail, the Weeknd had to obtain clearance from the recording artists he had originally sampled for certain songs, including Beach House's "Master of None" for "The Party & The After Party" and Siouxsie and the Banshees's "Happy House" on "House of Balloons / Glass Table Girls"; the sample of Aaliyah's "Rock the Boat" on "What You Need" was excluded from Trilogy.

On November 13, 2022, the Weeknd announced that he is considering removing Trilogy from streaming services due to both the original samples finally being cleared and him not being a fan of the updated mixes, telling fans to instead listen to the three mixtapes individually.

== Promotion ==
The Weeknd toured in support of Trilogy during September to November 2012. He previewed the album at a listening party in New York City on October 24. It was his first major media event.

=== Singles ===
The album's lead single "Wicked Games" was released on October 22, 2012. with the video for its remastered version released four days prior, on October 18, 2012. The song charted at number 43 on the Canadian Hot 100, it reached number 53 on the US Billboard Hot 100 and number 13 on the US Hot R&B/Hip-Hop Songs.

The second single, "Twenty Eight" was released on November 13. Its music video was released on February 13, 2013, directed by Nabil Elderkin.

"The Zone" was released as the album's third and final single three days later, its video shot in January 2012, and released on November 13, 2012.

=== Other songs ===
A video accompanying the track "Rolling Stone" was released on October 3, 2012, to promote the album's release. The Weeknd posted an open letter to his fans on his website, where he explained the meaning of the video.

== Critical reception ==
Professional ratings
Aggregate scores
| Source | Rating |
|---|---|
| AnyDecentMusic? | 8.1/10 |
| Metacritic | 79/100 |
Review scores
| Source | Rating |
| AllMusic | 3/5 stars |
| Entertainment Weekly | B+ |
| Fact | 5/5 |
| The Guardian | 4/5 stars |
| The Irish Times | 4/5 stars |
| Mojo | 4/5 stars |
| The Observer | 4/5 stars |
| Pitchfork | 8.5/10 |
| Rolling Stone | 2.5/5 stars |
| Uncut | 8/10 |

Trilogy was met with generally positive reviews. At Metacritic, which assigns a normalized rating out of 100 to reviews from professional publications, the album received an average score of 79, based on 19 reviews. Aggregator AnyDecentMusic? gave it 8.1 out of 10, based on their assessment of the critical consensus.

John Calvert of Fact dubbed it "an r'n'b album with few equals in terms of narrational ambition". Oliver Keens of Time Out wrote that the Weeknd "communicates" his character "so engagingly on Trilogy" and found him "riveting when he juxtaposes debauchery with a delivery that finds him numb and on the verge of tears". Killian Fox of The Observer felt that the mixtapes' "production sounded great to start with" and that the "new material is unexceptional", but ultimately stated, "if you didn't pick up the mixtapes when they were going free, and can handle 160 minutes of beautifully crafted nihilism, this is an essential buy". Although he found the new songs "arbitrary in terms of sequencing", Pitchfork's Ian Cohen cited the compilation as "some of the best music of the young decade; judging by its already pervasive influence, it's safe to say Trilogy (or at least House of Balloons) will be one of those records that will be viewed as a turning point when we look at the 2010s as a whole".

In a mixed review, AllMusic's Andy Kellman felt that, despite moments when he is "distinctively gripping", the Weeknd lacks "restraint, as he is prone to repetitious whining that is more young boy than young Keith Sweat". Kellman wrote that "now that he's with a label, he'll hopefully get some kind of filter that enables him to fulfill the promise heard in these 160 minutes of one-dimensional, occasionally exhilarating overindulgence ... His potential is as obvious as his lyrics are toxic". Kevin Ritchie of Now found the music "impressive", but found the "lyrical ambivalence" to be "a bit one-note" by the album's second hour. Although he found its "excess oppressive" when listened to in its entirety, Drowned in Sound's Robert Leedlum deemed Trilogy to be "untouchable" as a "comprehensive document of a specific moment in time". Paul MacInnes of The Guardian wrote that its three discs "offer a rough trajectory of party, after-party and hangover, through which an assertive voice gives way to one that sounds more troubled", and concluded, "Trilogy does remove some of the Weeknd's mystique – lyrical formulae become apparent, and examples of engaging melody recede as the collection advances. Whatever its limits, however, Trilogy remains a striking piece of work".

== Commercial performance ==
Trilogy charted at number five on the Canadian Albums Chart. In the United States, it debuted at number four on the Billboard 200, with first-week sales of 86,000 copies. By August 2015, the release has sold 558,000 copies in the United States. On March 18, 2019, Trilogy was certified triple platinum by the Recording Industry Association of America (RIAA). On June 10, 2022, the album was certified triple platinum by Music Canada.

== Track listing ==
Disc one: House of Balloons
| No. | Title | Writer(s) | Producer(s) | Length |
|---|---|---|---|---|
| 1. | "High for This" | Abel Tesfaye; Adrien Gough; Henry Walter | Dream Machine | 4:07 |
| 2. | "What You Need" | Tesfaye; Jeremy Rose | Rose; The Weeknd | 3:16 |
| 3. | "House of Balloons / Glass Table Girls" | Tesfaye; Martin McKinney; Carlo Montagnese; Susan Ballion^{[a]}; Peter Clarke^{[a]}; John McGeoch^{[a]}; Steven Severin^{[a]} | Doc McKinney; Illangelo | 6:47 |
| 4. | "The Morning" | Tesfaye; McKinney; Montagnese | McKinney; Illangelo | 5:15 |
| 5. | "Wicked Games" | Tesfaye; Rainer Millar Blancheur; McKinney; Montagnese | McKinney; Illangelo | 5:24 |
| 6. | "The Party" & "the After Party" | Tesfaye; Rose; Blanchaer; Victoria Legrand^{[b]}; Alex Scally^{[b]} | Rose; The Weeknd; Rainer | 7:39 |
| 7. | "Coming Down" | Tesfaye; McKinney; Montagnese | McKinney; Illangelo | 4:55 |
| 8. | "Loft Music" | Tesfaye; Rose; Legrand^{[c]}; Scally^{[c]} | Rose; The Weeknd | 6:04 |
| 9. | "The Knowing" | Tesfaye; McKinney; Montagnese; Elizabeth Fraser^{[d]}; Robin Guthrie^{[d]}; Simon Raymonde^{[d]} | McKinney; Illangelo | 5:41 |
| 10. | "Twenty Eight" (bonus track) | Tesfaye; McKinney; Montagnese | McKinney; Illangelo | 4:18 |
| Total length: | | | | 53:26 |

Disc two: Thursday
| No. | Title | Writer(s) | Producer(s) | Length |
|---|---|---|---|---|
| 1. | "Lonely Star" | Tesfaye; McKinney; Montagnese | McKinney; Illangelo | 5:49 |
| 2. | "Life of the Party" | Tesfaye; McKinney; Montagnese; Björn Berglund^{[e]}; Pontus Berghe^{[e]}; Anthony Grier^{[e]}; Vini Reilly^{[e]} | McKinney; Illangelo | 4:57 |
| 3. | "Thursday" | Tesfaye; McKinney; Montagnese | McKinney; Illangelo | 5:19 |
| 4. | "The Zone" (featuring Drake) | Tesfaye; Aubrey Graham; McKinney; Montagnese | McKinney; Illangelo | 6:58 |
| 5. | "The Birds, Pt. 1" | Tesfaye; McKinney; Montagnese | McKinney; Illangelo | 3:34 |
| 6. | "The Birds, Pt. 2" | Tesfaye; McKinney; Montagnese; Nicholas Bird^{[f]}; Steve Crittall^{[f]}; Alex McGowan^{[f]}; Martina Topley-Bird^{[f]} | McKinney; Illangelo | 5:50 |
| 7. | "Gone" | Tesfaye; McKinney; Montagnese | McKinney; Illangelo | 8:07 |
| 8. | "Rolling Stone" | Tesfaye; McKinney; Montagnese | McKinney; Illangelo | 3:50 |
| 9. | "Heaven or Las Vegas" | Tesfaye; McKinney; Montagnese | McKinney; Illangelo | 5:53 |
| 10. | "Valerie" (bonus track) | Tesfaye; McKinney; Montagnese | McKinney; Illangelo | 4:46 |
| Total length: | | | | 55:03 |

Disc three: Echoes of Silence
| No. | Title | Writer(s) | Producer(s) | Length |
|---|---|---|---|---|
| 1. | "D.D." | Michael Jackson | Illangelo | 4:35 |
| 2. | "Montreal" | Tesfaye; Montagnese; France Gall^{[g]} | Illangelo | 4:10 |
| 3. | "Outside" | Tesfaye; Ahmad Balshe; Montagnese; Madeline Follin^{[h]}; Ryan Mattos^{[h]} | Illangelo | 4:20 |
| 4. | "XO" / "The Host" | Tesfaye; Montagnese | Illangelo | 7:23 |
| 5. | "Initiation" | Tesfaye; Martin Wong; Montagnese; Georgia Anne Muldrow^{[i]} | DropxLife; Illangelo | 4:20 |
| 6. | "Same Old Song" (featuring Juicy J) | Tesfaye; Montagnese | Illangelo | 5:12 |
| 7. | "The Fall" | Tesfaye; Michael Volpe; Montagnese | Clams Casino; Illangelo | 5:45 |
| 8. | "Next" | Tesfaye; Montagnese | Illangelo | 6:00 |
| 9. | "Echoes of Silence" | Tesfaye; Montagnese | Illangelo | 4:02 |
| 10. | "Till Dawn (Here Comes the Sun)" (bonus track) | Tesfaye; McKinney; Montagnese | McKinney; Illangelo | 5:19 |
| Total length: | | | | 51:06 |

iTunes Store bonus music video
| No. | Title | Writer(s) | Length |
|---|---|---|---|
| 11. | "The Zone" (featuring Drake) (closed-captioned) | Tesfaye; Graham; McKinney; Montagnese | 5:16 |

Sample credits

- ^{^[a]} "House of Balloons / Glass Table Girls" contains elements of "Happy House", written by Susan Ballion, Peter Clarke, John McGeoch and Steven Severin; and a sample of "Happy House", as performed by Siouxsie and the Banshees.
- ^{^[b]} "The Party & the After Party" contains elements of "Master of None", written by Victoria Legrand and Alex Scally; and a sample of "Master of None", as performed by Beach House.
- ^{^[c]} "Loft Music" contains elements of "Gila", written by Victoria Legrand and Alex Scally; and a sample of "Gila", as performed by Beach House.
- ^{^[d]} "The Knowing" contains elements of "Cherry Coloured Funk", written by Elizabeth Fraser, Robin Guthrie and Simon Raymonde; and a sample of "Cherry Coloured Funk", as performed by Cocteau Twins.
- ^{^[e]} "Life of the Party" contains elements of "Drugs in My Body", written by Björn Berglund, Pontus Berghe, Anthony Grier and Vini Reilly.
- ^{^[f]} "The Birds, Pt. 2" contains elements of "Sandpaper Kisses", written by Nicholas Bird, Steve Crittall, Alex McGowan and Martina Topley-Bird.
- ^{^[g]} "Montreal" contains elements of "Laisse tomber les filles", written by France Gall.
- ^{^[h]} "Outside" contains elements of "Go Outside", written by Madeline Follin and Ryan Mattos.
- ^{^[i]} "Initiation" contains elements of "Patience", written by Georgia Anne Muldrow; and a sample of "Patience", as performed by Georgia Anne Muldrow.

== Personnel ==
Credits for Trilogy adapted from liner notes.

- Matthew Acton – assistant engineer, engineer
- Hyghly Alleyne – executive producer
- Rainer Millar Blanchaer – musician, producer
- William Brock – guitar
- Noel Cadastre – assistant engineer
- Clams Casino – musician, producer
- Drake – featured artist
- Dream Machine – producer
- Drop – artwork, design, executive producer
- DropXLife – musician, producer
- Adrian "Adrian X" Eccleston – guitar
- Adrien Gough – musician
- Patrick Greenaway – guitar
- Juicy J – featured artist, vocals
- Shin Kamiyama – assistant engineer
- Doc McKinney – engineer, executive producer, instrumentation, musician, producer
- Carlo "Illangelo" Montagnese – engineer, executive producer, instrumentation, mixing, musician, producer
- Jeremy Rose – engineer, musician, producer
- Mark Santangelo – mastering
- Noah "40" Shebib – engineer
- Ben Swantek – design
- La Mar Taylor – executive producer, photography
- Henry Walter – engineer, musician
- The Weeknd – executive producer, musician, primary artist, producer
- Jake Wilson – executive producer

== Charts ==
=== Weekly charts ===
Chart performance for Trilogy
| Chart (2012–2023) | Peak position |
|---|---|
| Australian Albums Chart | 93 |
| Belgian Albums (Ultratop Flanders) | 60 |
| Belgian Albums (Ultratop Wallonia) | 163 |
| Canadian Albums (Billboard) | 5 |
| Danish Albums (Hitlisten) | 22 |
| Dutch Albums (Album Top 100) | 48 |
| French Albums (SNEP) | 128 |
| German Albums (Offizielle Top 100) | 90 |
| Irish Albums (IRMA) | 87 |
| Scottish Albums (Official Charts) | 67 |
| Swiss Albums (Schweizer Hitparade) | 58 |
| UK Albums (Official Charts) | 37 |
| UK R&B Albums (Official Charts) | 2 |
| US Billboard 200 | 4 |
| US Top R&B/Hip-Hop Albums (Billboard) | 1 |

=== Year-end charts ===
2013 year-end chart performance for Trilogy
| Chart (2013) | Position |
|---|---|
| US Billboard 200 | 65 |
| US Top R&B/Hip-Hop Albums (Billboard) | 17 |

2014 year-end chart performance for Trilogy
| Chart (2014) | Position |
|---|---|
| US Top R&B/Hip-Hop Albums (Billboard) | 80 |

2015 year-end chart performance for Trilogy
| Chart (2015) | Position |
|---|---|
| Australian Hip Hop/R&B Albums (ARIA) | 72 |
| US Billboard 200 | 97 |

2016 year-end chart performance for Trilogy
| Chart (2016) | Position |
|---|---|
| US Billboard 200 | 122 |

2017 year-end chart performance for Trilogy
| Chart (2017) | Position |
|---|---|
| US Billboard 200 | 154 |

== Certifications ==
Certifications for Trilogy
| Region | Certification | Certified units/sales |
|---|---|---|
| Australia (ARIA) | Gold | 35,000^{‡} |
| Canada (Music Canada) | 3× Platinum | 240,000^{‡} |
| Denmark (IFPI Danmark) | Platinum | 20,000^{‡} |
| New Zealand (RMNZ) | Platinum | 15,000^{‡} |
| United Kingdom (BPI) | Platinum | 300,000^{‡} |
| United States (RIAA) | 3× Platinum | 3,000,000^{‡} |
^{‡} Sales+streaming figures based on certification alone.

== Release history ==
Release dates and formats for Trilogy
| Region | Date | Label(s) | Format(s) | Edition | Ref. |
|---|---|---|---|---|---|
| Australia | November 9, 2012 | Republic | CD | Standard | |
| Germany | November 9, 2012 | Republic | CD | Standard | |
| United Kingdom | November 12, 2012 | Digital Distribution Turkey; Island | CD; digital download | Standard | |
| Canada | November 13, 2012 | XO; Universal | CD; digital download | Standard | |
| United States | November 13, 2012 | Republic | CD; digital download | Standard | |
| United States | March 26, 2013 | XO; Republic | LP | Standard | |
| United States | November 27, 2017 | XO; Republic | LP | 5-year anniversary | |

== See also ==
- List of Billboard number-one R&B albums of 2012
