= House of Balloons / Glass Table Girls =

Song by the Weeknd

from the album House of Balloons
- Released: March 21, 2011
- Recorded: January 2011
- Genre: Alternative R&B
- Length: 6:47
- Label: XO
- Songwriters: Abel Tesfaye; Martin McKinney; Carlo Montagnese; Susan Ballion; Peter Clarke; John McGeoch; Steven Severin
- Producers: Doc McKinney; Illangelo

Audio
- "House of Balloons / Glass Table Girls" on YouTube

"House of Balloons / Glass Table Girls" is a song by the Canadian singer-songwriter the Weeknd, from his debut mixtape, House of Balloons (2011). The Weeknd wrote the song with its producers, Doc McKinney and Illangelo. It was included on his compilation album, Trilogy (2012). The song is a two-part track. Its first part, "House of Balloons", was built around a sample of the British band Siouxsie and the Banshees' 1980 single, "Happy House", and lyrically attempts to convince someone that everything is alright in his "happy house". Its second part, "Glass Table Girls", replaces the sample with a darker beat, and discusses lyrical themes of drug abuse and sex.

Music journalists included the song in several listicles and praised its sadness, its production, the use of falsetto, and the song's exploration of a degenerate party nightmare and the obsessed music world. It was performed at the Weeknd's first shows and included on the set lists for all of his tours: The Fall Tour (2012), The Kiss Land Fall Tour (2013), the Madness Fall Tour (2015), the Starboy: Legend of the Fall Tour (2017), Asia Tour (2018), and the After Hours til Dawn Tour (2022–2026). It was certified silver by the British Phonographic Industry (BPI).

== Background and production ==
In an interview with Rolling Stone, the Weeknd said that the inspiration for the first part and the mixtape's title came from a house located in Parkdale, Toronto. He stated that he and his friends would throw parties and invite girls over, and to make it more "celebratory", they would add balloons.

The producer Doc McKinney had first met the Weeknd through Adrian Gough and Cirkut in January 2011. As McKinney played songs to the Weeknd for consideration, "House of Balloons / Glass Table Girls" immediately caught his attention. During an interview with the Canadian broadcaster Tom Power, McKinney revealed more information regarding the recording of the track; stating that before the second part of the track was made, it was originally a 25 minute version of "House of Balloons". The Weeknd expressed his desire to rap at the end of the track, asking McKinney to make a beat, leading to the creation of "Glass Table Girls".

The Weeknd released his debut mixtape, House of Balloons, through his website on March 21, 2011. Out of nine songs, "House of Balloons / Glass Table Girls" is placed at number three. Afterwards, it was included on the Weeknd's compilation album, Trilogy, on November 13, 2012.

== Music and lyrics ==
"House of Balloons"
"House of Balloons", the first half, is structured on Siouxsie and the Banshees' 1980 single, "Happy House" as deeply referenced in the chorus.

"Glass Table Girls"
"Glass Table Girls", the second half, shifts the track into a darker tone with a mix of rapping and low-pitch singing based on drugs and sex.

The song is a two-part track. In the first part, "House of Balloons", the Weeknd sings about a party he is at in his "Happy House". It is an R&B song built around a sample of "Happy House" by the British post-punk band Siouxsie and the Banshees. McKinney stated that he initially conceived the beat for the song in 2008, intending it for Santigold before he played it to the Weeknd. The song has the Weeknd sing about a party, unconvincingly telling the listener that it is "happy here, in a happy house". While ranking the Weeknd's best beat switches, Billboard's Bianca Gracie wrote about the first part's overall sound: "[a] rattling bassline, sharp synths, and [his falsetto]" mimicks the high of "whatever narcotic."

Around three and a half minutes into the track, the track's instrumental switches to its second song, "Glass Table Girls", with the sample from "Happy House" replaced by a much darker beat, described by Billboard as "brute percussion and low-end churn". The verse features the Weeknd mixing rapping and low-pitch singing about doing cocaine, sleeping with another person's girlfriend, and themes of sex. Impact described the Weeknd as being "completely gone" by the end.

== Critical reception ==
In a review of the first half of the song, Pitchfork noted how while the song may sound like a "fluffy counterpart" to "What You Need", the song has a similar level of sadness to it. They later ranked it at number 57 on their list of Top 100 Songs, with Eric Grandy saying it was "Tesfaye at his best, emoting in a androgynous falsetto one minute, muttering unbelievable curses the next." Billboard named it a "song that defined the 2010s" calling the song "intoxicating and menacing", stating it is "the sound of a party degrading in real time", writing that the journey the Weeknd has in the song, from "kinda creepy but mostly chill" to "a degenerate nightmare [of a gathering of merrymakers]" only works as it does because the two songs are in one track, rather than being separated. Daria Patarek of Impact called the track "another incredible entry in the Weeknd's debut mixtape 'House of Balloons', which explores his rise to fame, and consequently his entry into the drug-ridden, sex-filled and money-obsessed music world."

Rolling Stone ranked "House of Balloons / Glass Table Girls" as the Weeknd's 9th best track, noting its second half as "one of the most viscerally affecting entries in the Weeknd's whole catalog, as icy and thunderous as an avalanche." They also placed its first part 488th on their 2021 revision of the 500 Greatest Songs of All Time. Complex named "House of Balloons / Glass Table Girls" as the best song released under the XO record label, stating it "defined" the sound of the Weeknd's "trailblazing, totally singular debut mixtape House of Balloons," further writing that the song's sound "would swiftly dominate the Weeknd's native Toronto and far beyond," and that it would influence an entire decade of "moody hip-hop and melancholic R&B." They further wrote that the song's production was a stand out, writing that it dug into a "bleak but beautiful vibe" which soon spread around.

== Live performances ==
"House of Balloons / Glass Table Girls" was performed at the Weeknd's first ever show at the Mod Club Theatre on July 24, 2011. The song was included on the set list for his headlining performance at the Coachella Valley Music & Arts Festival, which was his first show in the United States, followed by during The Fall Tour, his debut headlining tour in North America tour and for his first show in the United Kingdom on June 8. The full song was included on the set list for three of his concert tours—the Kiss Land Fall Tour (2013), the Madness Fall Tour (2015) and Asia Tour (2018). Its second part by itself was included on the set list for the Starboy: Legend of the Fall Tour (2017) and the first part during his Super Bowl LV halftime show on February 7, 2021, and on the set list for the second leg of the After Hours til Dawn Tour (2023).

== Personnel ==
Credits adapted from Apple Music.

- Abel Tesfaye (The Weeknd) – lead vocals, composition, songwriting, executive production
- Carlo Montagnese (Illangelo) – composition, production, mixing, engineering
- Martin McKinney (Doc McKinney) – composition. production, engineering
- Matthew Acton − assistant recording engineer

=== Samples ===
- Susan Ballion (Siouxsie Sioux) – songwriting
- John McGeoch – songwriting
- Steven Severin – songwriting
- Peter Clarke (Budgie) – songwriting

== Charts ==
Chart performance for "House of Balloons / Glass Table Girls"
Chart (2026)	Peak position
Sweden Heatseeker (Sverigetopplistan)	6

== Certifications ==
Certifications for "House of Balloons / Glass Table Girls"
Region	Certification	Certified units/sales
Denmark (IFPI Danmark)	Gold	45,000^{‡}
New Zealand (RMNZ)	Platinum	30,000^{‡}
United Kingdom (BPI)	Platinum	600,000^{‡}
^{‡} Sales+streaming figures based on certification alone.
