= The Morning (song) =

Song by the Weeknd

from the album House of Balloons and Trilogy
- Released: March 21, 2011
- Recorded: 2010
- Length: 5:15
- Label: XO
- Songwriters: Abel Tesfaye; Martin McKinney; Carlo Montagnese
- Producers: Doc McKinney; Illangelo

Audio video
- "The Morning" on YouTube

"The Morning" is a song by the Canadian singer-songwriter the Weeknd which serves as the fourth track from his debut mixtape, House of Balloons (2011). It was written by the Weeknd alongside its producers, Doc McKinney and Illangelo. In 2012, the song was remastered and released on the Weeknd's compilation album, Trilogy (2012).

== Background ==
"The Morning" was first uploaded to YouTube by the Weeknd under the username "xoxxxoooxo" in early December 2010 alongside "What You Need" and "Loft Music". A demo of the song that had a different instrumental than its final version surfaced in late 2011.

"The Morning" was included in the 2019 film Uncut Gems, in which the Weeknd appeared in and performed the track live.

== Critical reception ==
The song received critical acclaim. Pitchfork placed the track at number 15 for its top 100 songs of 2011, citing its "large and rich" production along with Tesfaye's soft vocals, stating that it messes with how you would expect R&B tracks to sound. Pitchfork would later place it at number 115 of its top 200 songs of the 2010s, regarding it as "the greatest song the Weeknd ever made" and calling it the "pop American Psycho".

Rolling Stone would declare the track as the Weeknd's 11th best song, citing that the song is a "surprisingly radiant hustler's anthem" and calling it "expected Weeknd club sleaze."

== Charts ==
2012 chart performance for "The Morning"
Chart (2012)	Peak position
US Bubbling Under R&B/Hip-Hop Singles (Billboard)	9

2026 chart performance for "The Morning"
Chart (2026)	Peak position
UK Singles Sales (Official Charts)	63

== Certifications ==
Certifications for "The Morning"
Region	Certification	Certified units/sales
Canada (Music Canada)	Platinum	80,000^{‡}
Denmark (IFPI Danmark)	Gold	45,000^{‡}
New Zealand (RMNZ)	Platinum	30,000^{‡}
United Kingdom (BPI)	Platinum	600,000^{‡}
United States (RIAA)	Platinum	1,000,000^{‡}
^{‡} Sales+streaming figures based on certification alone.
