= The Zone (song) =

Single by the Weeknd featuring Drake

from the album Thursday and Trilogy
- Released: November 16, 2012
- Length: 6:58
- Label: XO; Republic
- Songwriters: Aubrey Graham; Abel Tesfaye; Martin McKinney; Carlo Montagnese
- Producers: Doc McKinney; Illangelo

The Weeknd singles chronology
"Twenty Eight" (2012)	"The Zone" (2012)	"Kiss Land" (2013)

Drake singles chronology
"Poetic Justice" (2012)	"The Zone" (2012)	"Love Me" (2013)

Music video
- "The Zone" on YouTube

"The Zone" is a song by Canadian singer-songwriter the Weeknd featuring fellow Canadian singer and rapper Drake, serving as the fourth track from the former's second mixtape Thursday (2011). In 2012, the song was remastered and released as the third single from his compilation album Trilogy on November 16, 2012, through XO and Republic Records. The song was the first collaboration between the two artists.

== Music video ==
The music video for "The Zone" was filmed during January 2012. The video was never uploaded at first, however the Weeknd confirmed that it was going to be included as bonus material from his compilation album, Trilogy. The visual was released on November 8, 2012, and was directed by himself. Since its release, the Vevo upload of the video has been viewed over 82 million times on YouTube. The music video features a shortened version of the song, and includes both artists.

== Personnel ==
Credits adapted from liner notes for Trilogy.

- The Weeknd – composer, primary artist
- Drake – featured artist
- Doc McKinney – composer, instrumentation, producer
- Carlo "Illangelo" Montagnese – composer, instrumentation, mixing, producer

== Charts ==
Chart performance for "The Zone"
Chart (2012)	Peak position
US R&B/Hip-Hop Digital Song Sales (Billboard)	50

== Certifications ==
Region	Certification	Certified units/sales
Australia (ARIA)	Gold	35,000^{‡}
United States (RIAA)	Platinum	1,000,000^{‡}
^{‡} Sales+streaming figures based on certification alone.

== Release history ==
Region	Date	Format	Label(s)	Ref
Worldwide	November 16, 2012	Digital download	XO; Republic	
