= Twenty Eight (song) =

Single by the Weeknd

from the album House of Balloons and Trilogy
- Released: November 13, 2012
- Recorded: 2010–2012
- Studio: Site Sound Studios (Toronto)
- Genre: Alternative R&B
- Length: 4:18
- Label: XO; Republic
- Songwriters: Abel Tesfaye; Doc McKinney; Carlo Montagnese
- Producers: Doc McKinney; Illangelo

The Weeknd singles chronology
"Wicked Games" (2012)	"Twenty Eight" (2012)	"The Zone" (2012)

Music video
- "Twenty Eight" on YouTube

"Twenty Eight" (also stylized as "28") is a song by the Canadian singer-songwriter the Weeknd, featured as a bonus track on the version of his debut mixtape House of Balloons (2011). It was released as the album's second single on November 13, 2012, by XO and Republic Records. The song only appears on the reissue of the mixtape that is included with his 2012 compilation album, Trilogy. The song was recorded at Site Sound Studios and mixed at Liberty Studios in Toronto. Producers Doc McKinney and Illangelo co-wrote the song and performed all instrumentation.

Many early songs by Tesfaye are about him tricking, manipulating and cheating on his girlfriends, but in "Twenty Eight" the roles are reversed. The song is named "Twenty Eight" due to there being 28 grams in an ounce, which is something important for drug dealers to know. The song is also the twenty eighth official release by Tesfaye. The song as a whole has been compared to Frank Ocean and Miguel, while Tesfaye's vocals specifically have been compared to Michael Jackson.

"Twenty Eight" was first heard by the general public when Tesfaye sent the track to DJ Zane Lowe, who in turn played the song on BBC Radio 1. Tesfaye would make his first appearance on the show for an interview later that month. The song charted at number 150 on the UK Singles Chart and at number 49 on the US R&B/Hip-Hop Digital Song Sales, and is also certified Platinum in the US.

== Music video ==
The music video for "Twenty Eight" premiered on February 13, 2013, on the Weeknd's YouTube account. It was filmed in Bucharest, Romania, and was directed by photographer/director Nabil Elderkin. The video features Tesfaye on a talk show, with him being unable to focus due to seeing visions of his ex girlfriend. The video is incredibly sexual, featuring many nude women/strippers. Due to the explicit portrayal of breasts in the video, it has been age-restricted on YouTube.

== Track listing ==
Digital download
No.	Title	Writer(s)	Producer(s)	Length
1.	"Twenty Eight"	Abel Tesfaye; Doc McKinney; Carlo Montagnese	Doc McKinney; Illangelo	4:18

== Personnel ==
Credits adapted from liner notes for Trilogy.

- Abel Tesfaye (The Weeknd) – lead vocals, songwriting/composition, additional production
- Carlo Montagnese (Illangelo) – production, songwriting, mixing, recording engineer
- Martin McKinney (Doc McKinney) – production, songwriting, recording engineer
- Shin Kamiyama – assistant recording engineer
- Nabil Elderkin – music video director
- Isaac Hagy – music video editor

== Charts ==
Chart performance for "Twenty Eight"
Chart (2012–2013)	Peak position
UK Singles (Official Charts Company)	150
US R&B/Hip-Hop Digital Song Sales (Billboard)	49

== Certifications ==
Region	Certification	Certified units/sales
United States (RIAA)	Platinum	1,000,000^{‡}
^{‡} Sales+streaming figures based on certification alone.

== Release history ==
Region	Date	Format	Label(s)	Ref
Worldwide	November 13, 2012	Digital download	XO; Republic	
