= Super Bowl LV halftime show =

Halftime show of the 2021 Super Bowl

- Part of: Super Bowl LV
- Date: February 7, 2021
- Location: Tampa, Florida, U.S.
- Venue: Raymond James Stadium
- Headliner: The Weeknd
- Special guests: Oneohtrix Point Never
- Sponsor: Pepsi
- Director: Hamish Hamilton
- Producers: Jesse Collins; NFL Network; Jay-Z; Roc Nation

Super Bowl halftime show chronology
LIV (2020)	LV (2021)	LVI (2022)
the Weeknd concert chronology
The Weeknd Asia Tour (2018)	Super Bowl LV halftime show (2021)	After Hours til Dawn Tour (2022–2026)

The Super Bowl LV halftime show, officially known as the Pepsi Super Bowl LV Halftime Show, was the halftime entertainment of Super Bowl LV, and took place on February 7, 2021, at Raymond James Stadium in Tampa, Florida. It was headlined solely by Canadian singer-songwriter the Weeknd. The show was televised in the U.S. by CBS.

== Background ==
On November 12, 2020, the selection of the Weeknd to headline the show was announced, marking the first time a Canadian solo artist headlined the Super Bowl halftime show. The performance was initially rumored to last for 24 minutes, according to an interview the Weeknd had with Billboard on January 28, 2021. However, representatives for the singer-songwriter denied the rumor, stating that it would actually be "roughly 12–13 minutes long". When asked about preparations for the show, the Weeknd stated, "We've been really focusing on dialing in on the fans at home and making performances a cinematic experience, and we want to do that with the Super Bowl." He contributed $7 million to the halftime performance.

== Development ==
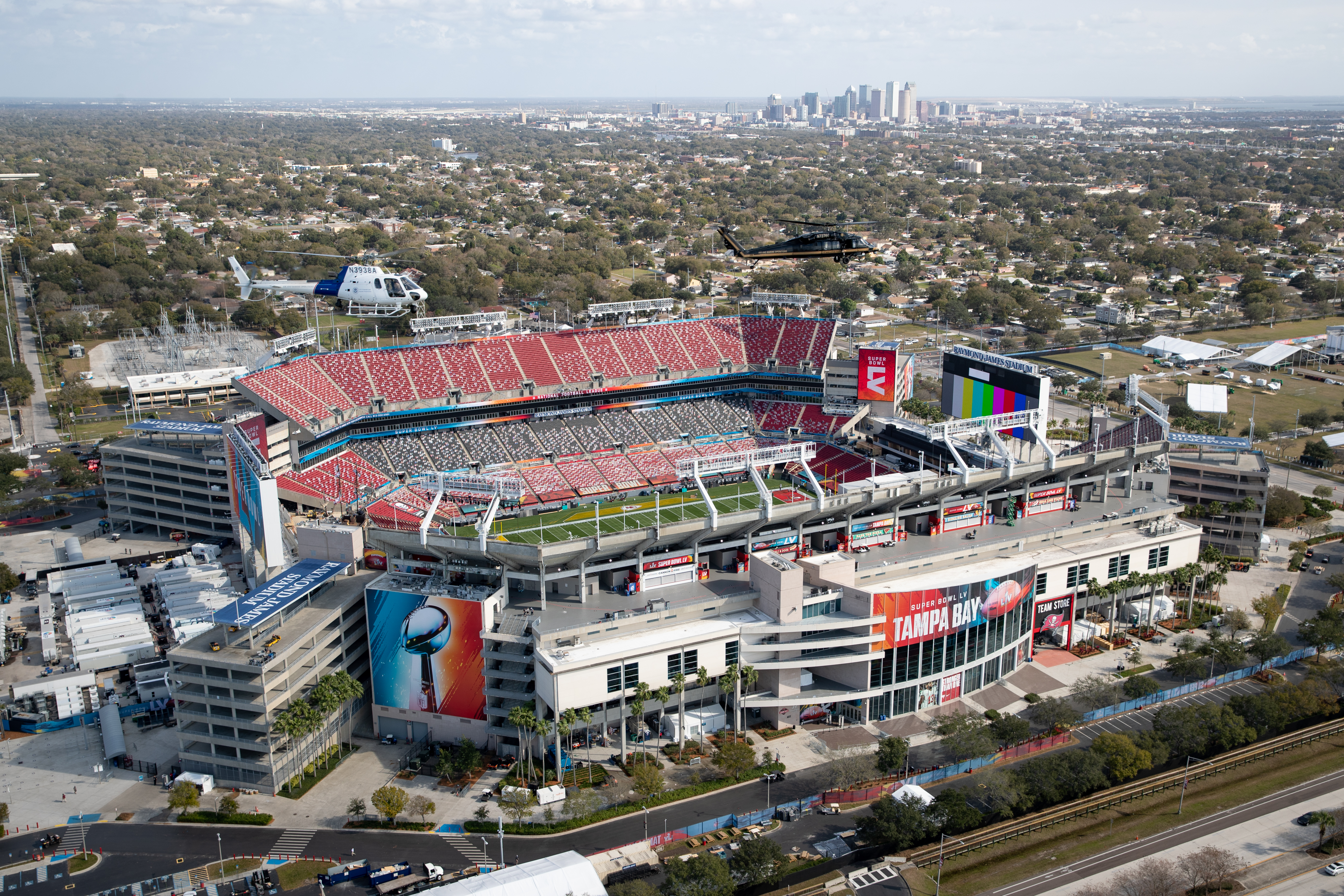
Raymond James Stadium

The halftime show was executive produced by Dave Myers, Jesse Collins, Jay-Z and Roc Nation, who also served as the creative directors. The performance was directed by Hamish Hamilton, who has directed every Super Bowl halftime show since 2010. The Weeknd's band was directed by experimental electronic musician Oneohtrix Point Never.

In contrast to past years, the decision was made to build the stage within the stadium for the safety of workers and players, however the field was still used. The show also featured no guest performers, unlike many previous halftime shows. The stage was designed by Bruce Rodgers of Tribe, who has designed the stages for every Super Bowl halftime show since 2007. It was located beneath one of the stadium's video boards. 1,050 individuals worked on the show, a far lesser number than the 2,000 to 3,000 individuals that worked on previous halftime shows. Due to the ongoing COVID-19 pandemic, preparations included regular COVID-19 testing, as well as social distancing in production trailers.

== Synopsis ==
External videos
- Full Super Bowl LV halftime show – via the NFL's official channel on YouTube.

The performance featured a choir whose members were dressed in white and wore masks over their faces with glowing red eyes, and were standing within a backdrop of a neon cityscape. For the performance, the Weeknd wore a red blazer, black necktie and leather gloves. The outfit was designed by Givenchy and was embroidered with crystals.

The performance opened with a white figure dressed the same as the choir being lowered into the backdrop where the choir was standing while singing "Call Out My Name". At this time, the Weeknd sat in a convertible against a skyline backdrop designed to resemble the Las Vegas Strip. For the next part of the performance, the backdrop then split open to reveal the Weeknd, who then performed "Starboy", followed by "The Hills". Next, performing the song "Can't Feel My Face", the Weeknd traveled through a labyrinth constructed behind the stage, joined by dancers dressed in red blazers and black neckties similar to his, but with their faces covered with bandages, in keeping with the aesthetic of his fourth studio album After Hours (2020). The dancers would wear these bandages throughout the performance. In the labyrinth section of the performance, camerawork was visually unsteady. The next songs performed were "I Feel It Coming", "Save Your Tears", and "Earned It". For the "Earned It" performance, the Weeknd was accompanied by violinists.

For the finale of the show, the Weeknd took to the field of the stadium with his dancers to perform "Blinding Lights". He and the dancers entered the field by performing "House of Balloons / Glass Table Girls". The performance ended with an array of fireworks.

== Critical reception ==
The halftime show received generally positive reviews. Criticisms labeled the show as less spectacular, with no guest performers, and suffering from poor audio. Given the performance's mid-pandemic circumstances, several reviews pointed out this context would not allow for a more elaborate performance, but many complimented its production level.

Jon Caramanica of The New York Times wrote that the show was, "sturdy, sometimes impressive". Patrick Ryan of USA Today called the performance "charismatic". He called it a "departure" from the previous year's "joyous performance". He opined that it did not live up to some past halftime shows, such as the 2007 show performed by Prince and the 2013 show headlined by Beyoncé. However, he opined that it was a "vast improvement" over the 2011 show headlined by the Black Eyed Peas and the 2019 show headlined by Maroon 5. Writing that the show both "dazzled" and "overwhelmed", Larry Fitzmaurice of GQ wrote that the Weeknd "didn't even come close to commanding the stage the way previous performers had" at the Super Bowl. Jillian Mapes of Pitchfork called the performance "a fever dream for the whole family", writing that it was, "goofy, celebratory, and even a little bit unsettling."

Nate Scott of For The Win gave the performance a lukewarm review, opining that while the performance was "good" and "fine", it "wasn't great". Scott criticized the camerawork featuring in the segment of the performance filmed inside of the labyrinth as, "disorienting (and kind of nauseating)." He also criticized the audio quality. Jim Harrington of The Mercury News wrote that the Weeknd's performance was "solid, not super". Craig Jenkins of Vulture wrote that "the show delivered a vivid array of elaborate, expensive set pieces that hit the necessary notes for a halftime gig." While writing that he "made a case for himself as a pop phenomenon with staying power", Jenkins also opined that the Weeknd, "highlighted some of the least-interesting moments in his catalog." Chuck Arnold of the New York Post wrote that the performance made it clear that the Weeknd is not yet the same caliber of a live performer as either Prince or Michael Jackson, both past halftime show performers. Arnold found that the highlight of the performance was the rendition of "Blinding Lights".

Spencer Kornhaber of The Atlantic wrote, "It's tempting to give the Weeknd points for edginess, but his commentary on emptiness is pretty empty". Comparing his performance to past Super Bowl Halftime performers, Kornhaber wrote, "When the time came to ascend the biggest stage in the world, Prince was raunchier, Madonna was ruder, Janet Jackson actually upset people, and Beyoncé forced a political confrontation. Moreover, those greats blended provocation with a risky sense of hope. The Weeknd's blank charm and eerie lighting feinted at meeting this bizarre moment in history but ultimately offered a shrug."

In a highly positive review, Dominic Patten of Deadline hailed the performance as a "touchdown", calling it a "technical spectacle". Rachel Brodsky of The Independent rated the performance four out of five stars, calling it "slick" and "hyper-stylised", praising it as a, "brilliantly escapist 10 minutes that not only solidified his pop domination, but helped a deeply divided country – however briefly – dance away the pain of this past year." Lyndsey Parker of Yahoo! Entertainment called it, "one of the most dazzling halftime shows in recent memory", and wrote that it was on-par with the previous year's halftime show headlined by Shakira and Jennifer Lopez. Joe Riviera of Sporting News wrote, "for the most part, the show was unique and high-energy". Ed Masley of The Arizona Republic called the performance a, "crowd-pleasing spectacle", and opined that the absence of special guests did not hurt the performance, as such guests would have been unneeded. Mikael Wood of the Los Angeles Times called the performance, "spooky yet darkly funny" and an, "appealingly bizarre spectacle reflected the COVID era in both mood and logistics". AJ Romano of Vox called the performance "mellow but satisfying", writing that the Weeknd displayed, "confidence and charm". Giving the show four out of five stars, Adrian Horton of The Guardian wrote that the show was, "a pleasingly middle ground performance – not outright explicit" and praised the Weeknd for displaying "impressive vocals and stamina". Mark Savage of BBC opined that the Weeknd made the most of restrictions put in place due to the pandemic, delivering a, "gimmick-free show that put the emphasis on his songs." Calling the halftime show "disorienting", but declaring that it, "felt right", Stephanie Hayes of the Tampa Bay Times wrote that the Weeknd "vacillated between buoyant hits and unsettling imagery, striking a chord for these times." In a mostly positive review, Andrew Unterberger of Billboard called the Weeknd's performance a "14-minute set that presented a pretty convincing argument for him having one of the strongest catalogs of any modern pop hitmaker". Unterberger, however, did note that the performance had a, "lack of truly stunning moments".

In a negative review, Britt Julious of the Chicago Tribune called the performance "an expensive nothing". Julious derided the Weeknd as lacking in "vocals, stage presence and charisma", and opined that the Weeknd's "body movements and awkward, pseudo-sensual hand gestures to the camera" were "uncomfortable". Mesfin Fekadu of the Associated Press called the show boring, writing that he found the performance, "limited and inadequate". Fekadu criticized the decision to forgo musical guests. Fekadu wrote that the highlight of the performance was the rendition of "Blinding Lights". Bobby Olivier of NJ.com criticized the Weeknd for lacking in charisma, writing, "he's just not a particularly dynamic live entertainer." Olivier also criticized the decision to forgo musical guests. Alex Suskind of Entertainment Weekly griped about the quality of the sound mixing and "lack of tech-savvy pageantry".

Soon after the show took place, Vulture ranked the performance in the mid-tier of Super Bowl Halftime Shows since 1993. Similarly, Aaron Tallent of Athlon Sports soon after ranked it in the mid-tier of all Super Bowl Halftime Shows.

== Impact ==
Toronto mayor John Tory declared February 7, 2021, as The Weeknd Day in celebration of the Weeknd's performance at the halftime show.

In the United States, the Super Bowl LV halftime show attracted 96.7 million viewers, slightly higher than the game itself, which was viewed by an average of 96.4 million television viewers.

The show had an immediate impact on the Weeknd's streaming figures, with MRC Data showing 48.9 million streams of his music catalog over the period of February 7–8 (the day of and day after the performance), a 42% increase in compared to the 34.5 million streams his catalog saw February 5–6. Combined, the eight songs performed at halftime, in addition to "House of Balloons/Glass Table Girls" (which saw a brief excerpt incorporated into the show), saw 23.8 million streams, a 51% increase over the combined 15.77 million these songs received February 5–6. His most-streamed song was "Blinding Lights", which saw 6.54 million streams (a 42% increase). His second-most streamed song was "Save Your Tears", which saw 6.19 million streams (a 23% increase). These two songs, combined, accounted for 26% of the Weeknd's streams in February 7–8. Of the other seven songs, "The Hills" saw 2.52 million streams (a 79% increase), "Starboy" saw 2.16 million streams (a 70% increase), "Can't Feel My Face" saw 1.69 million streams (a 83% increase), "I Feel It Coming" saw a 1.55 million increase (a 87% increase), "Earned It" saw 1.44 million streams (a 88% increase), "Call Out My Name" saw 1.25 million streams (a 46% increase), and "House of Balloons/Glass Table Girls" saw 465,000 streams (a 350% increase).

In addition to his streaming figures, the show also had an immediate commercial impact on the Weeknd's sales. Per Billboard, the Weeknd's music sales increased 36,500 in combined sales of songs and albums on February 7, the day of the Super Bowl, an increase of 385% from the 7,500 sold on February 6. The increase of sales of songs was 454% (an increase to 32,500 from the 6,000 sold the previous day), and the increase of albums was 138% (an increase to 4,000 from the under 2,000 sold previous day). Billboard reported that most of his February 7 sales were in songs he had included in his halftime show setlist. The nine songs in the setlist sold a collective 29,000 downloads on February 7, compared to the 4,500 downloads they had sold the previous day. The best-performing song was "Blinding Lights", which accounted for 29% of his overall February 7 sales and 32% of his February song sales, selling 10,000 copies, an increase of 423% from the 2,000 copies it had sold the previous day. Of the eight other songs performed in the setlist, on February 7 "Save Your Tears" sold 4,000 copies (an increase of 245%), "Can't Feel my Face" sold 3,500 copies (an increase of 987%), "Earned It" sold 3,000 copies (an increase of 1,240%), "Starboy" sold 2,500 copies (a 1,175% increase), "I Feel It Coming" sold 2,500 copies (a 1,021% increase), and "The Hills" sold 2,000 (a 771% increase). His bestselling album on February 7 was The Highlights, which sold 1,500 copies (an increase of 120%). The greatest hits album had been released two days before the halftime performance. His second-best-selling album on February 7 was his most recent studio album, After Hours, which sold 1,000 copies (an increase of 67%).

== Documentary ==
The creation and preparations for the halftime show was featured in the documentary The Show, directed by Nadia Hallgren. The documentary, which was produced by the halftime show sponsor Pepsi's in-house content studio and Boardwalk Pictures, aired on Showtime on September 24, 2021.

== Set list ==
The Weeknd

1. "Call Out My Name"
2. "Starboy"
3. "The Hills"
4. "Can't Feel My Face" (With elements of "After Hours")
5. "I Feel It Coming"
6. "Save Your Tears" (With elements of "House of Balloons")
7. "Earned It"
8. "House of Balloons"
9. "Blinding Lights"

== Awards and nominations ==
Award	Date of ceremony	Category	Nominee(s)	Result	Ref.
Primetime Emmy Awards	September 10 and 11, 2021	Outstanding Variety Special (Live)	Shawn Carter, Desiree Perez, Jesse Collins, Aaron Cooke, Dionne Harmon, Dan Parise, Dave Meyers and Abel 'The Weeknd' Tesfaye	Nominated	
Primetime Emmy Awards	September 10 and 11, 2021	Outstanding Lighting Design/Lighting Direction for a Variety Special	Al Gurdon, Ben Green, Jeff Nellis, Mark Humphrey, Eric Marchwinski, Jason Rudolph and Alen Sisul	Nominated	
Primetime Emmy Awards	September 10 and 11, 2021	Outstanding Technical Direction, Camerawork, Video Control for a Special	Rod Wardell, Eric Becker, Robert Del Russo, Kevin French, Shaun Harkins, Jay Kulick, Jeff Latonero, Tore Livia, Allen Merriweather, Jofre Rosero, Mike Harvath, David Geller, Don Miller, Keith Rees, Timmy Mueller, Jeff Gentile, Jon Mantak, Carmen Long, Frank Lombardo, Steve Webster, Stephen Wharton, Ed Martino, Rian Weigart, JD Curl, Christian Pantuosco, Andrew Lawing, Joe Ward, John "JM" Hurley, Ian Fleisher and Emelie Scaminaci	Nominated	
