= Mikael Colombu =

French music video and film director

- Born: Mikael Edouard François Colombu; April 25, 1975 (age 49); Paris, France
- Occupation(s): Film director, music video director
- Years active: 2010–present

Mikael Colombu is a French music video and film director. He created the animation style Jankyvision.

== Early life and career ==
Colombu was born in Paris, France on April 25, 1975. Colombu's father, Jean Pierre Colombu, was a French surgeon and his mother, Jeanne-Aelia Desparmet Hart, was a French fashion designer. Colombu moved with his mother and younger brother Kevin Colombu to New York City in 1986, then Boston in 1988, and back to New York City in 1991. Colombu relocated back to Paris, France in 1993 at the age of 18. Colombu began attending art school in 1996.

== Career & Style ==
In 2010 Colombu created the animation style Jankyvision which is made mostly with photography. Jankyvision debuted as a project music video for the singer Bilal.

In 2013, Colombu directed a commercial for TY KU starring CeeLo Green.

== Videography ==
- Bilal – "Robots"
- Onra - "Intro"
- J Dilla - "Bus-A-Yo"
- CeeLo Green - "Bodies"
- The Weeknd - "The Knowing"
- Cee Lo Green - "This Christmas"
- Dirty Radio - "Found You"
- Drake - "We'll Be Fine"
