= Wicked Games =

2012 single by the Weeknd

Single by the Weeknd

from the album House of Balloons and Trilogy
- Released: September 25, 2012
- Recorded: Site Sound Studios (Toronto)
- Genre: Alternative R&B
- Length: 4:41 (single edit); 5:24 (album version)
- Label: XO; Republic
- Songwriters: Abel Tesfaye; Doc McKinney; Carlo Montagnese; R. Millar Blancheur; C. Ray Garza
- Producers: Doc McKinney; Illangelo

The Weeknd singles chronology
"Remember You" (2012)	"Wicked Games" (2012)	"Twenty Eight" (2012)

Music video
- "Wicked Games" on YouTube

"Wicked Games" is the debut single by the Canadian singer-songwriter the Weeknd, and serves as the fifth track from his debut mixtape, House of Balloons (2011). It was written by the Weeknd, Doc McKinney, and Illangelo with the latter two producing. The song was remastered and released as the lead single from his 2012 compilation album, Trilogy, on October 22, 2012, through XO and Republic Records. It was met with universal acclaim by music critics.

== Background and release ==
The audio for the original version of "Wicked Games" was released on the Weeknd's YouTube on March 5, 2011. In 2012, its House of Balloons version would be promoted as the lead single from the mixtape, being sent to rhythmic contemporary radio stations on September 25, 2012. The song's remastered version was officially released through streaming services on October 22, 2012, as the lead single from his compilation album, Trilogy (2012).

== Critical reception ==
Rolling Stone listed "Wicked Games" as the 42nd best R&B song of the 21st century.

== Music video ==
The music video for "Wicked Games" premiered on October 18, 2012, on the Weeknd's YouTube account on Vevo. The video starts off with a young woman dancing seductively in a coat with no clothes underneath, before the camera pans to The Weeknd, who is shown singing expressively. The Weeknd is also shown in a dark room, occasionally illuminated by spotlights behind him synced to the beat, and outside after leaving his G-Wagon. Since its release, the music video has received over 300 million views on YouTube.

== Commercial performance ==
"Wicked Games" became the Weeknd's first solo single to chart on the Billboard Hot 100, peaking at number 53, and remaining on the chart for 20 weeks. It was later certified three times platinum by the Recording Industry Association of America on January 30, 2019, for selling three million units in the United States.

== Personnel ==
Credits adapted from liner notes for Trilogy.

- The Weeknd – composer, primary artist
- Doc McKinney – composer, instrumentation, producer
- Illangelo – composer, instrumentation, mixing, producer
- Rainer Millar Blanchaer – composer

== Charts ==
=== Weekly charts ===
Weekly chart performance for "Wicked Games"
Chart (2012–2013)	Peak position
Belgium (Ultratip Bubbling Under Flanders)	83
Belgium Urban (Ultratop Flanders)	46
Canada Hot 100 (Billboard)	43
Canada CHR/Top 40 (Billboard)	21
UK Singles (Official Charts Company)	152
UK Hip Hop/R&B (Official Charts)	18
US Billboard Hot 100	53
US Hot R&B/Hip-Hop Songs (Billboard)	13
US R&B/Hip-Hop Airplay (Billboard)	8
US Rhythmic Airplay (Billboard)	10

=== Year-end charts ===
Year-end chart performance for "Wicked Games"
Chart (2013)	Position
US Hot R&B/Hip-Hop Songs (Billboard)	47

== Certifications ==
Region	Certification	Certified units/sales
Australia (ARIA)	2× Platinum	140,000^{‡}
Brazil (Pro-Música Brasil)	Platinum	60,000^{‡}
Canada (Music Canada)	2× Platinum	160,000^{‡}
Denmark (IFPI Danmark)	Gold	30,000^{^}
New Zealand (RMNZ)	Platinum	30,000^{‡}
Norway (IFPI Norway)	Gold	5,000^{‡}
United Kingdom (BPI)	Platinum	600,000^{‡}
United States (RIAA)	3× Platinum	3,000,000^{‡}
^{^} Shipments figures based on certification alone.^{‡} Sales+streaming figures based on certification alone.

== Release history ==
Country	Date	Format	Label
United States	September 25, 2012	Rhythmic contemporary radio	Republic
Canada	October 22, 2012	Digital download	Republic
United States	October 22, 2012	Digital download	Republic
United Kingdom	November 1, 2012	Digital download	Universal

== Covers ==
An orchestral cover of "Wicked Games" by series composer Ramin Djawadi appears on the soundtrack of the third season of the TV series Westworld.
