= Remember You (song) =

2012 single by Wiz Khalifa featuring the Weeknd

Single by Wiz Khalifa featuring the Weeknd

from the album O.N.I.F.C.
- Released: September 24, 2012
- Recorded: 2012
- Genre: Alternative hip hop; R&B
- Length: 4:50
- Label: Atlantic
- Songwriters: Cameron Thomaz; Abel Tesfaye; Carlo Montagnese; Ahmad Balshe; David Patino; Timothy Mosley; Jimmy Douglass; Elgin Lumpkin
- Producers: Illangelo; Dpat

Wiz Khalifa singles chronology
| "Celebration" (2012) | "Remember You" (2012) | "Don't Make Em Like You" (2012) |

The Weeknd singles chronology
| "Crew Love" (2012) | "Remember You" (2012) | "Wicked Games" (2012) |

Music video
- "Remember You" on YouTube

"Remember You" is a song by American rapper Wiz Khalifa featuring Canadian singer the Weeknd, released as the second single from the former's fourth studio album, O.N.I.F.C.. Produced by Dpat and Illangelo, the song samples "Tell Me Do U Wanna" by Ginuwine. It was released on September 24, 2012, by Atlantic's YouTube channel.

== Background ==
After delaying the album, Wiz Khalifa announced the second single of it, which is Remember You. He revealed the single's cover on his Twitter account, and it was later released on Atlantic's YouTube channel. In an interview with MTV News, Wiz Khalifa talked about the single stating it was a "beautiful idea of The Weeknd".

== Composition ==
The song uses "bass-heavy, minimalist production", and finds the Weeknd asking his "one-night lover" to do something that will make him remember her ("All I ask of you is try to earn my memory / Make me remember you, like you remember me"). Wiz Khalifa begins rapping nearly two minutes into the song.

== Music video ==
The official music video for the song was released on November 13, 2012, and directed by Ryan Hope. The video begins in a diner, where an "innocent-yet-curious" waitress and a woman with "blood-red lips, long dark hair and an even darker gaze" become attracted to each other. The two go out to a dark alley, exchanging kisses and an "erotic embrace" there. The waitress is taken to a "somewhat unusual and troublesome nighttime party" by the other woman, and is attracted to the "forbidden lifestyle" around the party. Wiz Khalifa briefly appears, rapping while he is tailored. The waitress stumbles around, before the clip ends with her crying on a bed as mascara runs down her face. The Weeknd does not appear in the video.

== Awards and nominations ==
| Year | Ceremony | Award | Result |
|---|---|---|---|
| 2014 | Grammy Awards (56th) | Best Rap/Sung Collaboration | Nominated |

== Track listing ==
Digital download

1. "Remember You" – 4:50

== Charts ==
=== Weekly charts ===
| Chart (2012–2013) | Peak position |
|---|---|
| UK Singles (OCC) | 186 |
| UK Hip Hop/R&B (OCC) | 31 |
| US Billboard Hot 100 | 63 |
| US Hot R&B/Hip-Hop Songs (Billboard) | 15 |
| US R&B/Hip-Hop Airplay (Billboard) | 12 |
| US Rhythmic Airplay (Billboard) | 27 |

=== Year-end charts ===
| Chart (2013) | Position |
|---|---|
| US Hot R&B/Hip-Hop Songs (Billboard) | 79 |

== Certifications ==
| Region | Certification | Certified units/sales |
|---|---|---|
| United States (RIAA) | Platinum | 1,000,000^{‡} |
^{‡} Sales+streaming figures based on certification alone.

== Radio and release history ==
| Country | Date | Format | Label |
|---|---|---|---|
| United States | September 24, 2012 | Digital download | Atlantic |
| United States | October 15, 2012 | Rhythmic radio | Rostrum; Atlantic; RRP |
