= Tell Your Friends (song) =

2015 song by the Weeknd

- Cover art for "When I See It" demo

Song by the Weeknd

from the album Beauty Behind the Madness
- Released: August 24, 2015
- Recorded: 2014
- Genre: Alternative R&B; hip-hop
- Length: 5:34
- Label: XO; Republic
- Songwriters: Abel Tesfaye; Kanye West; Christopher Pope; Carlo Montagnese; Carl Marshall; Michael Dean; Noah Goldstein; Robert Holmes
- Producers: The Weeknd; Kanye West; Che Pope; Illangelo; Mike Dean; Noah Goldstein; Omar Riad

Music video
- "Tell Your Friends" on YouTube

"Tell Your Friends" is a song by Canadian singer-songwriter the Weeknd from his second studio album, Beauty Behind the Madness (2015). The Weeknd co-wrote the song with Kanye West, Che Pope, Illangelo, Mike Dean, and Noah Goldstein, (Note: Find additional credits for the song on the BMI Repertoire by searching the work number #20502911.) co-producing it with Pope, West, Omar Riad, Illangelo, Dean, and Goldstein. The track samples "Can't Stop Loving You" by Soul Dog, with its writers Carl Marshall and Robert Holmes receiving songwriting credits. A live remix of the song with American rapper Nas was performed at the 2016 Met Gala Ball. In November 2015, American rapper Fabolous released his remix of the song, which appeared on his mixtape, Summertime Shootout.

== Background ==
"Tell Your Friends" originated as a demo by Kanye West, titled "When I See It". West released his version as a single on his SoundCloud account on October 19, 2015, alongside a remix of the song "Say You Will".

== Music video ==
The music video for "Tell Your Friends", directed by Grant Singer, was released on August 24, 2015. The music video also features another track from Beauty Behind the Madness, "Real Life" which is played at the end of the video while the Weeknd is driving out into the night. As of February 2025, the video has surpassed over 80 million views.

=== Synopsis ===
The video begins with the Weeknd walking into foreground holding a shovel, appearing to be burying himself, supposedly the previous iteration of himself of the Kiss Land era. He sticks the shovel in the sand and starts to walk away from where he is buried while performing to the song. A weird looking skinny man approaches his direction before getting shot by the Weeknd. The Weeknd gets closer standing over him, looks down at the body and shoots him again. Another song, "Real Life", plays at the end of the video as he walks back to where his car is parked. The Weeknd then gets into the car and starts driving out into the night.

== Charts ==
=== Weekly charts ===
Chart (2015)	Peak position
Canada Hot 100 (Billboard)	44
Sweden (Sverigetopplistan)	100
UK Singles (Official Charts)	74
US Billboard Hot 100	54
US Hot R&B/Hip-Hop Songs (Billboard)	19

=== Year-end charts ===
Chart (2015)	Position
US Hot R&B Songs (Billboard)	30

== Certifications ==
Region	Certification	Certified units/sales
Canada (Music Canada)	Gold	40,000^{‡}
New Zealand (RMNZ)	Gold	15,000^{‡}
United Kingdom (BPI)	Silver	200,000^{‡}
United States (RIAA)	Platinum	1,000,000^{‡}
^{‡} Sales+streaming figures based on certification alone.
