= Echoes of Silence =

Last of three 2011 mixtapes by the Weeknd

Mixtape by the Weeknd
- Released: December 21, 2011
- Recorded: 2011
- Genre: Alternative R&B
- Length: 45:45
- Languages: English; French
- Label: XO
- Producers: Clams Casino; DropXLife; Illangelo

The Weeknd chronology
Thursday (2011)	Echoes of Silence (2011)	Trilogy (2012)

Echoes of Silence is the third mixtape by the Canadian singer and songwriter the Weeknd, released on December 21, 2011, by XO. Like his debut mixtape House of Balloons and his second mixtape Thursday, the Weeknd collaborated with musician Illangelo; who produced the majority of the project. The project also featured first-time collaborations with producers Clams Casino and DropXLife and a spoken-word interlude from rapper Juicy J. Lyrically, Echoes of Silence contains similar themes to the Weeknd's previous projects, exploring his drug use and experiences with love. The project was preceded by the release of the promotional single "Initiation" on October 10, 2011.

An alternative R&B project with elements of post-industrial, darkwave, ambient, post-punk and trip hop, Echoes of Silence received widespread critical acclaim. It was named as a longlisted nominee for the 2012 Polaris Music Prize, marking the Weeknd's second consecutive nomination for the award. Echoes of Silence was later commercially released as part of the compilation album Trilogy (2012) and included the bonus track "Till Dawn (Here Comes the Sun)". On its tenth anniversary, the original mixes were released alongside a limited edition line of merchandise designed by illustrator Hajime Sorayama. A music video for the title track directed by the aforementioned illustrator was released on December 21, 2021.

== Critical reception ==
Professional ratings
Aggregate scores
Source	Rating
AnyDecentMusic?	7.7/10
Metacritic	82/100
Review scores
Source	Rating
AllMusic	3/5 stars
The A.V. Club	B+
Chicago Tribune	3.5/4 stars
Entertainment Weekly	B+
The Guardian	4/5 stars
Now	4/5 stars
Pitchfork	8.1/10
Rolling Stone	3.5/5 stars
Slant Magazine	3.5/5 stars
Spin	8/10

Echoes of Silence received widespread acclaim from critics. At Metacritic, which assigns a normalized rating out of 100 to reviews from mainstream publications, the mixtape received an average score of 82, based on 17 reviews. Evan Rytlewski of The A.V. Club said "it's Tesfaye's total commitment to his ghastly persona that makes Echoes Of Silence so entrancingly chilling." Greg Kot of Chicago Tribune said, "It's an impressive consolidation of his strengths, tightening up his songwriting and sharpening his often disturbing wordplay." Kyle Anderson of Entertainment Weekly wrote "Tesfaye's velvety melodies infuse his trippy minimalism like incense smoke, getting lost only on the too-woozy title track." Alexis Petridis of The Guardian said "the dragging beats, washes of synthesizer and eclectic musical references – chillwave and crunk hip-hop, Aaliyah and France Gall – somehow contrive to sound not just eerie and desolate but cosseting as well, inexorably drawing the listener into a deeply troubling world."

Benjamin Boles of Now said "the mood is still dark, druggy and claustrophobic, but this time Tesfaye is channeling a pain that's less about cold emptiness than it is about more traditional heartbreak and longing." Andrew Ryce of Pitchfork called Echoes of Silence "a strong finish to Tesfaye's first trilogy, providing just enough closure to satisfy, and just enough mystery left to entice us back for the next round." Jon Dolan of Rolling Stone wrote "the Weeknd has helped make R&B a creepier place, crooning too-honest come-ons over cavernous, ballad-slow tracks that balance leering sensuality with vague menace." In a mixed review, Matthew Cole of Slant Magazine said "disappointing as Echoes of Silence may be as a collection of songs, it nonetheless serves its purpose in giving the Weeknd's triptych a suitably grim finale." Brandon Soderberg of Spin said, "Echoes is a profound listen that, despite its veneer of cynicism, oozes pain and crisis."

== Track listing ==
All tracks produced by Illangelo, except where noted.

No.	Title	Writer(s)	Producer(s)	Length
1.	"D.D."	Michael Jackson		4:35
2.	"Montreal"	Abel Tesfaye; Carlo Montagnese; Isabelle Gall		4:10
3.	"Outside"	Tesfaye; Montagnese; Ahmad Balshe; Madeline Follin; Ryan Mattos		4:20
4.	"XO" (4:42) / "The Host" (2:41)	Tesfaye; Montagnese		7:23
5.	"Initiation"	Tesfaye; Martin Wong; Montagnese; Georgia Muldrow	DropxLife; Illangelo	4:20
6.	"Same Old Song" (featuring Juicy J)	Tesfaye; Montagnese		5:12
7.	"The Fall"	Tesfaye; Michael Volpe; Montagnese	Clams Casino; Illangelo	5:45
8.	"Next"	Tesfaye; Montagnese; Wong		6:00
9.	"Echoes of Silence"	Tesfaye; Montagnese		4:02

2012 reissue bonus track
No.	Title	Writer(s)	Length
10.	"Till Dawn (Here Comes the Sun)"	Tesfaye; Montagnese; Martin McKinney	5:19

=== Sample credits ===
- "D.D." is a cover of "Dirty Diana", originally performed by Michael Jackson.
- "Montreal" contains elements of "Laisse tomber les filles" ('Let the Girls Go'), performed by France Gall.
- "Outside" contains elements of "Go Outside", performed by Cults.
- "Initiation" contains a sample of "Patience", performed by Georgia Anne Muldrow.

== Charts ==
Chart performance for Echoes of Silence
Chart (2022–2026)	Peak position
Greek Albums (IFPI)	8
UK R&B Albums (Official Charts)	21
US Top Album Sales (Billboard)	18

== Release history ==
Region	Date	Format	Edition	Label
Various	December 21, 2011	Digital download; streaming	9-track free of charge	XO
Various	August 28, 2015	CD; LP	10-track remastered and remixed	XO; Republic
Various	February 1, 2016	Cassette	10-track remastered and remixed	XO; Republic
Various	December 21, 2021	Digital download; streaming	Original 9-track	XO; Republic
Various	July 1, 2022	LP	Original 9-track with alternative cover	XO; Republic
Various	July 1, 2022	LP	Original 9-track	XO; Republic
