= Thursday (album) =

Second of three 2011 mixtapes by the Weeknd

Mixtape by the Weeknd
- Released: August 18, 2011
- Recorded: 2010–2011
- Genre: Alternative R&B
- Length: 50:21
- Label: XO
- Producer: Doc McKinney; Illangelo; the Weeknd

The Weeknd chronology
House of Balloons (2011)	Thursday (2011)	Echoes of Silence (2011)

Singles from Thursday
- 1. "The Zone" Released: November 16, 2012

Thursday is the second mixtape by the Canadian singer-songwriter the Weeknd. It was released on August 18, 2011, by XO. Like his debut mixtape House of Balloons (2011), the Weeknd collaborated with producers and songwriters Doc McKinney and Illangelo; the duo produced Thursday in its entirety, and it contains fewer samples than its predecessor. Recorded in Toronto, the mixtape features a guest appearance from the Canadian rapper Drake.

Thursday has an unconventional and diverse musical style, drawing on downtempo, dubstep, dream pop, hip hop, rock, and reggae music. It contains similar themes to his previous works, exploring the Weeknd's drug use, libertinism, and experiences with love and newfound fame. He titled the mixtape as a reference to a contentious open relationship he had with a former lover.

The project was preceded by two promotional singles, "Rolling Stone" and "The Birds, Pt. 1". Thursday received critical acclaim, critics drawing comparisons to House of Balloons. It was later commercially released as part of his 2012 compilation album Trilogy, with "The Zone" being released as a single. On its tenth anniversary, the original mixes were released alongside a limited edition line of merchandise designed by artist Mr.

== Background and development ==
In December 2010, the Weeknd met Canadian producer Illangelo for the first time in a recording studio, where Illangelo was conducting sessions from the morning to the night. In their first session, they produced multiple songs, some ending up on the Weeknd's debut mixtape, House of Balloons (2011), and an early version of "Gone", the seventh track from Thursday. The fourth track, "The Zone" was conceptualized as Illangelo began playing a track, which the Weeknd soon began singing over. As Thursday's production continued, the Weeknd decided that Canadian rapper Drake would be the only feature on the mixtape. Drake came to the studio and recorded his verse for the song soon after.

== Promotion ==
=== Promotional singles ===
The mixtape's first promotional single, "Rolling Stone", was released on May 25, 2011.

"The Birds, Pt. 1" was released as the mixtape's second and final promotional single, on June 15, 2011.

== Critical reception ==
Professional ratings
Aggregate scores
Source	Rating
AnyDecentMusic?	7.5/10
Metacritic	80/100
Review scores
Source	Rating
AllMusic	2.5/5 stars
The A.V. Club	B
Consequence of Sound	4/5 stars
Fact	4/5
Now	4/5
Pitchfork	7.9/10
Q	4/5 stars
Resident Advisor	4.0/5
Rolling Stone	3/5 stars
Slant Magazine	4/5 stars

Thursday received critical acclaim. At Metacritic, which assigns a normalized rating out of 100 to reviews from mainstream publications, the mixtape received an average score of 80, based on 17 reviews. Evan Rytlewski of The A.V. Club said, "It's a rare songwriter who can craft music that's so repellent yet also so irresistible." Winston Robbins of Consequence of Sound said, "Despite the ridiculously high highs of this album, it fails to maintain a great pace throughout. It struggles back and forth between "good" and "great," whereas its foregoer grabbed "great" by the balls on the first track and never let go." Benjamin Boles of Now said, "It's not quite perfect: his voice is the star of the show but is occasionally buried under the clever beats and production. But that's a small complaint about someone who's looking more and more like one of the most exciting artists to emerge this year." Q magazine stated, "Toronto outfit, The Weeknd, has been hailed as one of the most exciting new sounds in modern R&B -- hype that, on the basis of this equally startling follow-up, seems entirely justified." Brandon Soderberg of Pitchfork said, "Though there's less breathing space on Thursday, and fewer melodic hooks, it still feels of a piece with House of Balloons."

BBC Music's Mike Diver made a positive review, saying, "File him beside Frank Ocean as an R&B star set to climb to new heights in 2012." Matthew Cole of Slant Magazine wrote, "The Weeknd is in full command of his craft, and at this point it's almost impossible for me to imagine that he won't deliver on the finale. He's earned my trust, as would any other artist who had already released two of the year's best albums." Tyler Fisher of Sputnikmusic said, "Listening to something like Thursday is the ultimate form of escapism that so many of us flock to music for. That's a quality that should be celebrated, not criticized for its lack of immediate pleasure." Jody Rosen of Rolling Stone gave a mixed review, commenting, "While it's refreshing to hear an R&B singer emphasizing the psychic toll of libertinism, his angst sex grows tiresome. Once in a while, can't this dude just get laid, and have fun doing it?"

== Track listing ==
All tracks produced by Doc McKinney and Illangelo.

No.	Title	Writer(s)	Length
1.	"Lonely Star"	Abel Tesfaye; Martin McKinney; Carlo Montagnese	5:49
2.	"Life of the Party"	Tesfaye; McKinney; Montagnese; Anthony Grier; Björn Berglund; Pontus Berghe; Vincent Reilly	4:57
3.	"Thursday"	Tesfaye; McKinney; Montagnese	5:19
4.	"The Zone" (featuring Drake)	Tesfaye; Aubrey Graham; McKinney; Montagnese	6:58
5.	"The Birds, Pt. 1"	Tesfaye; McKinney; Montagnese	3:34
6.	"The Birds, Pt. 2"	Tesfaye; McKinney; Montagnese; Martina Topley-Bird; Alex McGowen; Nicholas Bird; Steve Crittall	5:50
7.	"Gone"	Tesfaye; McKinney; Montagnese	8:07
8.	"Rolling Stone"	Tesfaye; McKinney; Montagnese	3:50
9.	"Heaven or Las Vegas"	Tesfaye; McKinney; Montagnese	5:53

2012 reissue bonus track
No.	Title	Writer(s)	Length
10.	"Valerie"	Tesfaye; McKinney; Montagnese	4:46

Credits for Trilogy adapted from liner notes.

- Abel Tesfaye (The Weeknd) – lead vocals, additional production songwriting/composition
- Carlo Montagnese (Illangelo) – production, songwriting, mixing recording engineer
- Martin McKinney (Doc McKinney) – production, songwriting, recording engineer
- Matthew Acton − assistant recording engineer (tracks 1, 6, 8 & 9)
- Adrian "X" Eccleston – guitar (track 2)
- Shin Kamiyama – assistant recording engineer (track 10)
- Noel Cadastre – assistant recording engineer (track 4)
- Drake – featured vocals, songwriting (track 4)

=== Sample credits ===
- "Life of the Party" contains elements of "Drugs in My Body", performed by Thieves Like Us.
- "The Birds Part 2" contains elements of "Sandpaper Kisses", performed by Martina Topley-Bird.

== Charts ==
Chart performance for Thursday
Chart (2022–2026)	Peak position
Greek Albums (IFPI)	5
UK R&B Albums (Official Charts)	16
US Top Album Sales (Billboard)	15

== Certifications ==
Certifications for Thursday
Region	Certification	Certified units/sales
United Kingdom (BPI)	Silver	60,000^{‡}
^{‡} Sales+streaming figures based on certification alone.

== Release history ==
Region	Date	Format	Edition	Label
Various	August 18, 2011	Digital download; streaming	9-track free of charge	XO
Various	August 21, 2015	CD; LP	10-track remastered and remixed	XO; Republic
Various	February 1, 2016	Cassette	10-track remastered and remixed	XO; Republic
Various	August 18, 2021	Digital download; streaming	Original 9-track	XO; Republic
Various	April 29, 2022	LP	Original 9-track with alternative cover	XO; Republic
Various	April 29, 2022	LP	Original 9-track	XO; Republic
