= High for This =

Song by the Weeknd

from the album House of Balloons and Trilogy
- Released: March 21, 2011
- Recorded: 2010–11
- Studio: Cirkut's Dream House (Toronto, Ontario)
- Genre: Alternative R&B
- Length: 4:07
- Label: XO
- Songwriters: Abel Tesfaye; Adrien Gough; Henry Walter
- Producer: Dream Machine

"High for This" is a song by the Canadian singer-songwriter the Weeknd, and serves as the opening track of his debut mixtape, House of Balloons (2011). It was written by the Weeknd with producers Adrien Gough and Cirkut. The track was later remastered and commercially released on the Weeknd's compilation album, Trilogy (2012). The track is referenced at the end of the final track of Tesfaye's final album under the Weeknd name Hurry Up Tomorrow, creating a loop of Tesfaye's discography under the Weeknd moniker.

== Music and recording ==
The producer Cirkut first met the Weeknd after being told about him through a mutual friend, who called him "the next big thing." The two later met for a recording session in Cirkut's home studio. After Cirkut created a bassline and some "general music arrangements", the Weeknd freestyled over the instrumental, which led to the creation of "High for This". The song was recorded in one day, but the two went over it several times before its final version.

The song's sheet music, published by Songs Music Publishing at Musicnotes.com, shows that the song is written in the key of B minor and follows a tempo of 69 beats per minute. The Weeknd's vocal range spans from B2 to F#4. "High for This" starts with a sound that is described by HotNewHipHop as "an eerie, ominous ringing in your ears," while stating that Tesfaye sings the first verse "as though he is on an MDMA-influenced high." Billboard's Kat Bein had described the track as "moody noise," with "throbbing percussion."

The lyrics of "High for This" are described in a review of its parent mixtape by Pitchfork as "[the Weeknd handholding] a partner through some strange sex act", while Highsnobiety further added on, interpreting the lyrics as the Weeknd coaching the listener through "getting high". Rolling Stone went more into detail, stating the line "Open your hand / Take a glass / Don't be scared / I'm right here" was the Weeknd's way to "red-pill" his listeners. Bein interpreted that the song could be his way of telling the listener that they want to be "high for the musical greateness that is to follow, i.e. his whole career."

== Critical reception ==
"High for This" was met with universal acclaim. Consequence ranked "High for This" as the Weeknd's 8th best song, stating that it "embodies" the label of "haunted strip club music", and called its production "cavernous [and] titillating". Rolling Stone ranked it as the Weeknd's 7th best song, stating it serves as the perfect introduction to the Weeknd's "groundbreaking" aesthetic, and further stating that the song hovers between "darkwave and bedroom R&B".

== Commercial performance ==
In France, the song peaked at 97. In the United States, "High for This" did not enter the Hot R&B/Hip-Hop Songs chart, but peaked at number 22 on the Hot R&B Songs chart.

== Personnel ==
Credits adapted from liner notes for Trilogy

- Abel Tesfaye (The Weeknd) – composer, songwriting, primary artist
- Adrien Gough – composer, songwriting, instrumentation, producer
- Henry Walter (Cirkut) – composer, songwriting, instrumentation, producer

== Charts ==
Chart performance for "High for This"
Chart (2012–2015)	Peak position
France (SNEP)	97
US Hot R&B Songs (Billboard)	22

== Certifications ==
Certifications for "High for This"
Region	Certification	Certified units/sales
Canada (Music Canada)	Platinum	80,000^{‡}
Denmark (IFPI Danmark)	Gold	45,000^{‡}
New Zealand (RMNZ)	Gold	15,000^{‡}
United Kingdom (BPI)	Silver	200,000^{‡}
United States (RIAA)	Platinum	1,000,000^{‡}
^{‡} Sales+streaming figures based on certification alone.

== In other media ==
The song "High for This" was featured in the promo for the final season of the HBO show Entourage in July 2011. English singer Ellie Goulding covered High For This as part of the special edition of her second studio album, Halcyon (2012).
