= Crew Love =

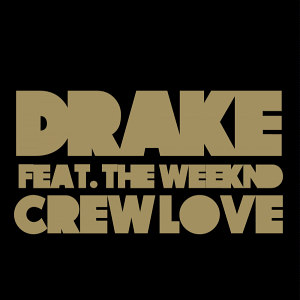

Single by Drake featuring the Weeknd

from the album Take Care
- Released: July 30, 2012
- Genre: Hip-hop; alternative R&B
- Length: 3:29
- Label: Aspire; Young Money; Cash Money; Republic
- Songwriters: Aubrey Graham; Abel Tesfaye; Carlo Montagnese; Noah Shebib; Anthony Palman
- Producers: Noah "40" Shebib; Illangelo; The Weeknd

Drake singles chronology
"Amen" (2012)	"Crew Love" (2012)	"Enough Said" (2012)

The Weeknd singles chronology
"Crew Love" (2012)	"Remember You" (2012)

"Crew Love" is a song by Canadian rapper Drake featuring Canadian singer the Weeknd from Drake's second studio album, Take Care (2011). It was originally set to be on the Weeknd's debut mixtape. "Crew Love" was released as the album's seventh single in the United Kingdom on July 30, 2012.

== Critical reception ==
Jon Dolan of Rolling Stone described the track as "avant-R&B lushness" and "a tender ode to metaphorical family in the face of a world where everybody wants a little Drake".

== Chart performance ==
"Crew Love" debuted at number 200 on the UK Singles Chart for the chart week of July 14, 2012. It entered the top 100 of the chart two weeks later at number 64, later peaking at number 37. The track also became a top ten hit on the UK R&B Chart, where it peaked at number seven.

Despite the absence of a proper single release in the United States, "Crew Love" managed to chart on several Billboard singles charts owing to strong rhythmic and urban contemporary radio airplay. It peaked at number nine on the Hot R&B/Hip-Hop Songs chart in June 2012, becoming Drake's twenty-fourth top ten single on the chart. The song also peaked at number 14 on the Hot Rap Songs chart and at number 80 on both the main Hot 100 singles chart and the Canadian Hot 100.

== Charts ==
Chart (2011–2012)	Peak position
Canada Hot 100 (Billboard)	80
Canada CHR/Top 40 (Billboard)	39
UK Singles (OCC)	37
UK Hip Hop/R&B (OCC)	7
US Billboard Hot 100	80
US Hot R&B/Hip-Hop Songs (Billboard)	9
US Hot Rap Songs (Billboard)	14
US Rhythmic Airplay (Billboard)	35

== Certifications ==
Region	Certification	Certified units/sales
Australia (ARIA)	Platinum	70,000^{‡}
New Zealand (RMNZ)	Gold	15,000^{‡}
United Kingdom (BPI)	Platinum	600,000^{‡}
United States (RIAA)	Platinum	1,000,000^{‡}
^{‡} Sales+streaming figures based on certification alone.

== Release history ==
Country	Date	Format	Label
United Kingdom	July 30, 2012	Contemporary hit radio	Universal
