= King of the Fall =

- 2014 release single art

Promotional single by the Weeknd

from the album The Highlights (Deluxe)
- Released: July 20, 2014
- Recorded: 2014
- Genre: Hip hop; cloud rap
- Length: 5:01
- Label: XO; Republic
- Songwriters: Jason Quenneville; Abel Tesfaye
- Producers: DaHeala; Mike Dean; Brandon Hollemon; the Weeknd

Music video
- "King of the Fall" on YouTube

Alternate cover art
- Cover art for the 2020 commercial release

"King of the Fall" is a song by Canadian singer the Weeknd. It was released as a promotional single to streaming services on July 20, 2014, to promote his King of the Fall Tour. The song was later officially re-released by XO and Republic Records on September 25, 2020. It accompanied the release of his remixed track "Rambo (Last Blood)" on the deluxe edition of Bryson Tiller's first studio album Trapsoul. A remix of the song featuring American rapper Ty Dolla Sign and Canadian rapper Belly was released on October 20, 2014, shortly following the release of the remix for "Often". It was later included on the deluxe edition of the Weeknd's second greatest hits album The Highlights which was released on February 9, 2024.

== Background and release ==
"King of the Fall"
The first 30 seconds of "King of the Fall"

The initial release of "King of the Fall" followed that of his 2014 single "Often" (which was released a month prior) and the announcement of his 2014 King of the Fall Tour. The two songs were released to promote his aforementioned tour and to get fans excited for his second studio album Beauty Behind the Madness, which included "Often" but excluded "King of the Fall".

The song was officially released to streaming services and digital retailers on September 25, 2020, after a six year period of unofficial uploads to streaming platforms such as Spotify. It followed the official release his remixed track "Rambo (Last Blood)" and the special Kiss Land episode of his Apple Music 1 radio show Memento Mori, which featured unreleased demos and songs from his early career.

== Critical reception ==
"King of the Fall" is considered by critics and fans alike as being a staple song in the Weeknd's discography. Alyson Lewis from uDiscover Music ranked the song as being Tesfaye's second most career defining track, complimenting his delivery and saying that song contains some of his most potent verses. Pranav Trewn from Stereogum ranked the song as being the ninth best in his discography, with him praising his singing and rapping on the song and calling it a "tour de force of all the places the Weeknd's voice can go".

== Commercial performance ==
In 2014, due to its limited initial release, "King of the Fall" was only eligible to chart at number one on the US Billboard + Twitter Trending 140. However, following its official release to digital retailers and mainstream streaming services in 2020, the song was able to debut at number 18 on the US Billboard Hot R&B Songs chart.

== Music video ==
The music video for "King of the Fall" was released on August 28, 2014. It was directed by Kid Studio and features the Weeknd walking through his hometown of Toronto.

== Charts ==
Chart (2014)	Peak position
US Billboard + Twitter Trending 140 (Billboard)	1

Chart (2020)	Peak position
US Hot R&B Songs (Billboard)	18

== Release history ==
Region	Date	Format	Label(s)	Ref.
Various	July 20, 2014	Streaming	XO; Republic	
Various	September 25, 2020	Digital download; streaming	XO; Republic	
