= House of Balloons =

First of three 2011 mixtapes by the Weeknd

Mixtape by the Weeknd
- Released: March 21, 2011
- Recorded: 2010–2011
- Studios: Doc McKinney's private studio (Toronto, Ontario); Dream House (Toronto, Ontario)
- Genre: Alternative R&B
- Length: 49:19
- Label: XO
- Producers: Doc McKinney; The Dream Machine; Illangelo; Jeremy Rose; Rainer Millar-Blanchaer; The Weeknd

The Weeknd chronology
House of Balloons (2011)	Thursday (2011)

Singles from House of Balloons
- 1. "Wicked Games" Released: September 25, 2012; 2. "Twenty Eight" Released: November 13, 2012

House of Balloons is the debut mixtape by the Canadian singer-songwriter the Weeknd. It was self-released free of charge on March 21, 2011, through his own record label, XO. House of Balloons was commercially reissued in 2012 through Republic Records as the first disc of the Weeknd's compilation album Trilogy, and was reissued in its original version with all samples present in 2021.

After releasing music under aliases in 2009, the Weeknd met with several producers, including Cirkut, Illangelo, and Jeremy Rose in 2010 and 2011 in Toronto, where songs on the mixtape were created. In January 2011, Doc McKinney and Illangelo became the project's primary producers. House of Balloons is an alternative R&B record that incorporates elements of dream pop, electro, rock, pop, and other genres. The lyrics symbolize the Weeknd's experiences in Toronto, and describe drug abuse, sexual encounters, and parties.

The Weeknd performed at select venues and music festivals throughout 2011 to promote House of Balloons, and the songs "Wicked Games" and "Twenty Eight" – the latter a bonus track included in the 2012 reissue – were released as singles. "Wicked Games" was the Weeknd's debut single and peaked at 53 on the Billboard Hot 100. In the United States, House of Balloons made its first appearance on the Billboard 200 more than 10 years after its release, peaking at 113, but had more success on Billboard's Top R&B/Hip-Hop Albums chart, peaking at number 37.

House of Balloons received widespread acclaim; music critics praised its dark aesthetic, production, and lyrical content. House of Balloons was shortlisted for the 2011 Polaris Music Prize, and it was frequently listed as one of the best projects of 2011. The Weeknd's anonymity during the project's rollout is attributed to fueling his popularity growth, inspiring artists to use the same approach. House of Balloons is also cited as altering the R&B genre, with its darker production, lyricism, and vocals contrasting with the more-upbeat tone of late-2000s-decade R&B.

== Background and production ==
At the age of seventeen, Abel Tesfaye dropped out of school, left his home, and relocated to an apartment in Toronto, Ontario, with two friends. Because these events occurred over a weekend, Tesfaye adopted the stage name "the Weeknd", omitting the third "e" to avoid trademark issues with Canadian band the Weekend. Before using this stage name, Tesfaye released music through YouTube in 2009 using the moniker "Kin Kane" as part of a hip-hop duo called "Bulleez n Nerdz". Tesfaye was also a part of a songwriting-and-production team called "the Noise", writing demos intended for artists such as Drake, Justin Timberlake, and Chris Brown.

In 2010, the Weeknd met producer Jeremy Rose through mutual friends in Toronto. After the Weeknd freestyled over some of Rose's instrumentals, Rose asked him if he wanted to work together on a "dark R&B project". Their sessions led to the conception of the first part of "The Party & the After Party", "What You Need", "Loft Music", and an early version of "The Morning". Rose left the project due to creative differences, but allowed the Weeknd to use the songs they produced under the condition Rose would receive production credits. In December, the Weeknd met Canadian producer Illangelo during one of the latter's daily studio sessions. Their first studio session together led to the creation of an early version of "Glass Table Girls" and songs that appear on the Weeknd's second mixtape, Thursday (2011). The Weeknd met producer Cirkut through a mutual friend, and they created "High for This" in one day. "Wicked Games" was written by the Weeknd and Rainer Millar-Blanchaer, who he met through mutual friends, and they wrote the track in Millar-Blanchaer's home studio.

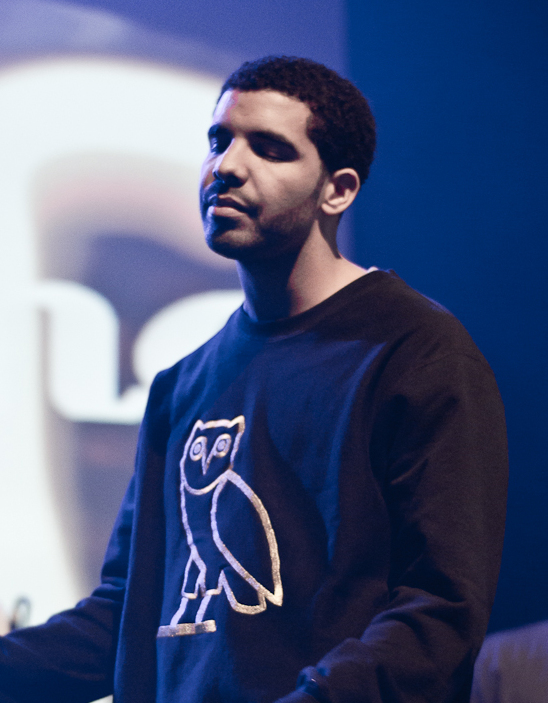
Some unreleased tracks from House of Balloons were later recorded by Drake.

In January 2011, Cirkut introduced the Weeknd to Doc McKinney, who played the Weeknd instrumentals, including the one for "House of Balloons", that were made in 2009. While creating "House of Balloons", the Weeknd's desire to rap led to McKinney improvising another beat within the track, which became a reworked version of "Glass Table Girls". McKinney, the Weeknd, and later Illangelo began further work on the mixtape in January. "The Knowing" was the first song the trio recorded together. Desiring something "wavy", the Weeknd asked McKinney to slow the instrumental from its original tempo of 90 beats per minute (BPM), becoming satisfied with the track once its tempo reached 45 BPM. As production progressed, the trio decided to release the mixtape for free in what Illangelo recalled was a rebellious manner.

Recording for House of Balloons shifted between studios in Toronto, including McKinney's private studio and Illangelo's personal room in Dream House Studios. Illangelo said the constant change in environment turned each song into a "collage of different equipment", making mixing each song into one body of work a challenge. According to the Weeknd in a 2016 interview, he frequently used drugs to support himself when he made his earlier projects. Songs from House of Balloons would be lengthy due to the Weeknd speaking his thoughts during recording sessions.

The Weeknd found inspiration from 1980s music while creating House of Balloons. He said Deftones heavily inspired the mixtape, alongside his other mixtapes released in 2011, Thursday and Echoes of Silence. In a 2013 interview with Complex, the Weeknd said House of Balloons was not mixed or mastered, attributing the decision to him viewing it as a mixtape rather than an album. He also said 14 tracks were planned for the mixtape before he lent some tracks to the Canadian rapper Drake for Drake's album Take Care (2011).

== Composition ==
=== Music and lyrics ===
House of Balloons is categorized as an alternative R&B record that incorporates elements of other genres, such as dream pop, electro, rock, hip-hop, trip hop, lo-fi, pop, and gothic rock. The Weeknd's mixing of genres with samples reflects a movement of black pop/R&B artists interacting with music from white, indie, pop, and rock artists. Symbolizing his experiences in Toronto, House of Balloons explores but does not romanticize the loneliness of partying at night, detailing late-night sexual and drug escapades, the aftermath of partying, and hedonistic fantasies.

=== Tracks ===
House of Balloons opens with an "eerie, ominous" ringing sound in "High for This", a dark wave and bedroom R&B song that begins with soft, whispered vocals and an echoing instrumental and later takes a darker tone, adding a commanding bass synth and a more-aggressive beat. The song details the Weeknd's attempts to coach his partner through a sex act. "What You Need" is an R&B track featuring a minimalistic beat, a basic, minor-synth chord progression, vocals Pitchfork's Larry Fitzmaurice described as "butter-dripping", and a sample of Aaliyah's 2001 single "Rock the Boat". Throughout the track, the Weeknd challenges a partner's current relationship with suggestive language, repeatedly telling her: "He's what you want / I'm what you need".

"House of Balloons"
The first part of "House of Balloons / Glass Table Girls" is structured heavily upon Siouxsie and the Banshees' 1980 single "Happy House". The Weeknd attempts to convince someone his party is a "happy house".

"Glass Table Girls"
The second part of "House of Balloons", "Glass Table Girls", replaces the sample with a more dark, hip-hop-inspired beat.

The mixtape's third track, "House of Balloons / Glass Table Girls", includes two separate songs combined into a single track. Its first part, "House of Balloons", is an R&B song that is structured around a sample of Siouxsie and the Banshees' 1980 single "Happy House". With a rattling bass line, sharp synths, and falsetto vocals, the Weeknd attempts to convince someone his party is stable, dubbing it a "happy house". Three and a half minutes in, the track transitions into its second part, "Glass Table Girls", which has been described as thematically darker than the first part. "Glass Table Girls" features a numbed rap with a low-end churn, a pulsating synth, and brute percussion that describes a negative side to partying, describing sex and the use of drugs. "The Morning", a song with large, rich production, is supported by what Joe Colly of Pitchfork describes as "whining guitars and sparkling synths", a distorted bass, and softly sung vocals; in this track, the Weeknd is in an upbeat moment before descending from the highs of the party that occurred the night before. "Wicked Games" is a soul ballad with a percussive backbeat in which the singer delivers lyrics about aching for love, even if the feelings are not mutual.

House of Balloons's sixth track is another two-part track titled "The Party & the After Party". Its first half, "The Party", is described as a blend of rap, rock, and pop. It uses a sped-up version of American duo Beach House's 2006 track "Master of None" for its instrumental, with flickering bells and smooth claps. In this part of the track, the Weeknd attempts to seduce a woman, eventually having sex with her. The second part of the track, "The After Party", begins three minutes and eighteen seconds in. The production switches to a staccato melody with lush harmonies and acoustic-guitar plucks. Continuing from the first part, the Weeknd wonders if his hook-up was the correct idea. Directly following the night of fast-paced ecstasy described in "The Party & the After Party" is the seventh track on House of Balloons, "Coming Down", which includes a vocal sample from the anime Fate/stay night, and is supported with a sound of wind and a mini-motif. Throughout the song, the Weeknd murmurs for his partner's sympathy as he admits his regret and reaffirms his loyalty to his partner, on whom he cheated the night before.

On "Loft Music", the Weeknd again samples Beach House, using their 2008 track "Gila". In "Loft Music"'s chorusless first half, the Weeknd mixes rapping and singing, while reassuring a woman who is undecided about hooking up with him. The second half, beginning two minutes and thirty-three minutes into the song, contrasts with the first half, containing what Billboard's Bianca Gracie describes as ethereal production, as the Weeknd wails throughout the track. The original mixtape ends with "The Knowing", which is built around a sample of Cocteau Twins' 1990 song "Cherry-Coloured Funk". With breathy vocals and a reverberant guitar, "The Knowing" describes the narrator's anger at his partner's infidelity while, despite his vulnerability, pretending to accept it. Later reissues of House of Balloons include a bonus track named "Twenty Eight". Accompanied by a pensive piano, the song describes the feeling of having one's heart broken by a woman.

== Promotion ==
=== Title and artwork ===
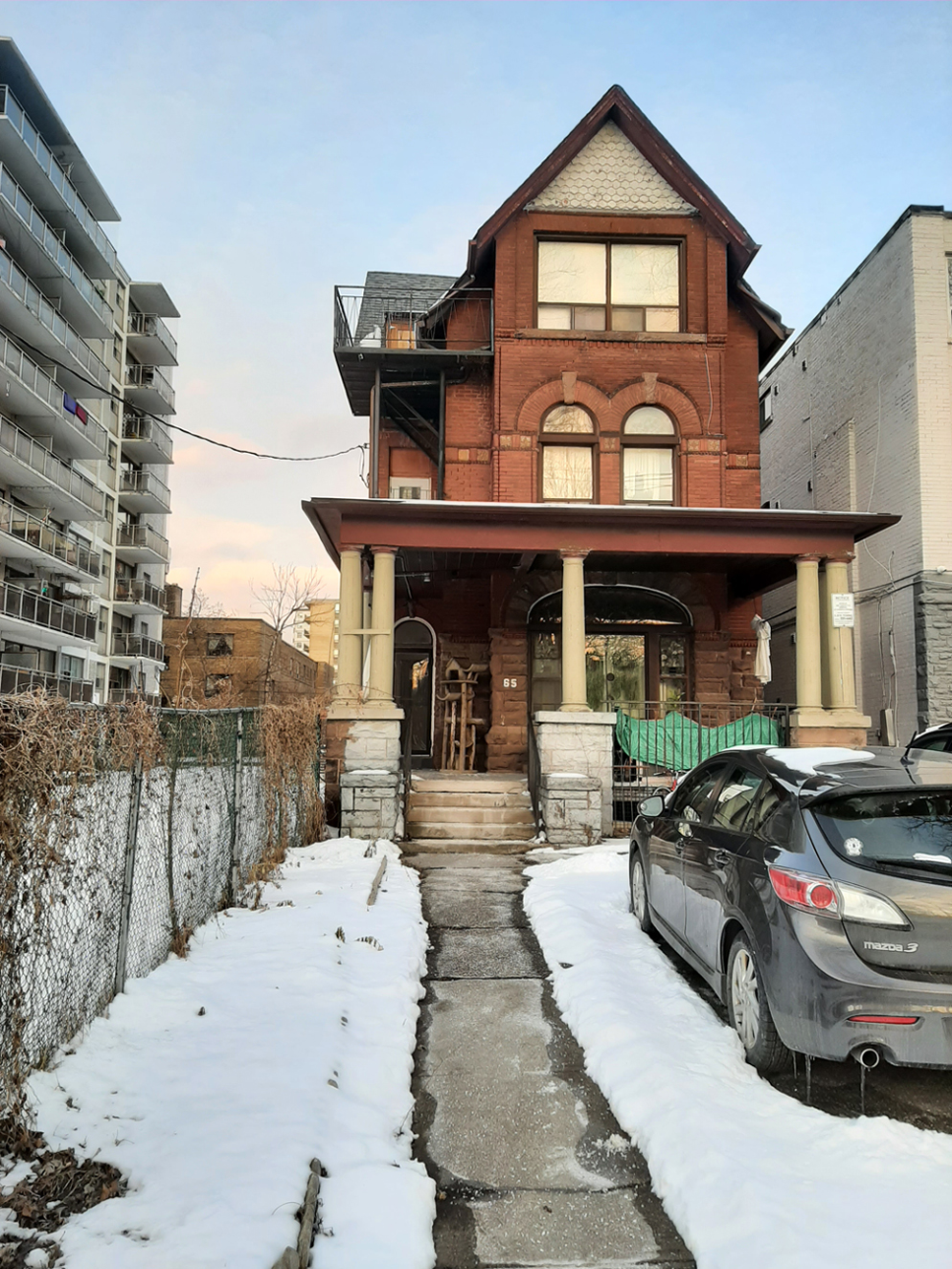
The Weeknd's old house that became the namesake for House of Balloons

The title House of Balloons originates from a house, located at 65 Spencer Avenue, Parkdale, Toronto, in which the Weeknd and his friends used to live. He said he and his friends would throw parties and added balloons for a more celebratory feel. The cover art depicts a woman with her face obscured by balloons and her left breast exposed. The Weeknd asked his friend La Mar Taylor for a cover photograph because the mixtape was ready for release. Taylor photographed the cover at his house with his ex-girlfriend.

=== Release and marketing ===
The release of House of Balloons was preceded by three promotional singles; "What You Need", "The Morning", and "Loft Music", all of which were released in December 2010. The songs gained traction online and two of them were eventually shared by Oliver El-Khatib, manager of Drake, through a post on Drake's blog on December 12. On March 7, 2011, Drake posted "Wicked Games" to his website, garnering more attention for the Weeknd. House of Balloons was released free of charge via a zip folder on March 21, 2011.

In May 2011, "High for This" was used in promotional material for the HBO original series Entourage. After multiple unofficial music videos, the Weeknd released his first official music video on November 24 for "The Knowing" that was directed by Mikael Colombu. Throughout 2011, the Weeknd performed in venues and music festivals, including Mod Club Theatre, Drake's OVO Fest, Guelph Concert Theater, and London Music Hall.

After announcing a deal with Republic Records, a mastered-and-mixed version of "Wicked Games" was released on September 14, 2012. The song was serviced to rhythmic contemporary radio on September 25, 2012. It was the Weeknd's debut single and charted on the Billboard Hot 100, peaking at number 53. The Weeknd worked to clear all of the samples on House of Balloons so it could be re-released through Republic as part of Trilogy (2012), a compilation album composed of mixed-and-mastered versions of three mixtapes he released in 2011. The use of Aaliyah's "Rock the Boat" on "What You Need" and the Fate/stay night vocal sample on "Coming Down" were excluded from Trilogy. A bonus song, "Twenty Eight", was included on Trilogy's release on November 13, 2012, on the House of Balloons disc, and was released the same day as both House of Balloons and Trilogy's second single. The mastered-and-mixed version of House of Balloons, including "Twenty Eight", was released as an LP record on August 14, 2015. On its tenth anniversary, the Weeknd cleared all of the samples on House of Balloons and releasing its original 2011 version to streaming services on March 21, 2021. American artist Daniel Arsham was engaged to create merchandise for the anniversary and special artwork for a limited-edition LP record.

== Critical reception ==
House of Balloons ratings
Aggregate scores
Source	Rating
AnyDecentMusic?	8.0/10
Metacritic	87/100
Review scores
Source	Rating
AllMusic	3.5/5 stars
The A.V. Club	B+
The Boston Phoenix	3.5/4 stars
Consequence	B
Drowned in Sound	8/10
Fact	4/5
Now	4/5
Pitchfork	8.5/10
PopMatters	9/10
Rolling Stone	4/5 stars

House of Balloons was met with widespread critical acclaim. At Metacritic, which assigns a normalized rating out of 100 to reviews from professional publications, House of Balloons received an average score of 87, based on 16 reviews. The aggregator AnyDecentMusic? gave it 8.0 out of 10, based on its assessment of the critical consensus. Based on these statistics, Metacritic determined House of Balloons is the third-best-reviewed project of 2011, while AnyDecentMusic? determined it is the 10th-best-reviewed project of the year.

Reviewers such as Joe Colly of Pitchfork, Corey Beasley of PopMatters, Andy Kellman of AllMusic, and Sean Fennessey of The Village Voice praised the sound and atmosphere of House of Balloons. Colly, Kellman, and The A.V. Club's Evan Rytlewski gave their attention to the production of the project's songs; Colly called it "incredibly lush, downcast". Tom Ewing of The Guardian said the mixtape's music is "amazingly effective", and that its atmosphere is what got the mixtape so much attention.

Critics gave praise to the Weeknd's vocals; these include reviews from Carrie Battan of The Boston Phoenix, Mike Diver of BBC Music, and Kevin Ritchie of Now, who stated the Weeknd's vocal delivery creates a "tension reminiscent of Aaliyah's clear-headed emotional states". Drowned in Sound's David Pott-Negrine called the Weeknd's falsetto soulful, stating it "cuts through everything like a knife". Sputnikmusic's Tyler Fisher compared the Weeknd's vocals to those of Frank Ocean and the-Dream, dubbing it a "silky smooth R&B voice".

Some critics, despite their positive reviews, also criticized House of Balloons; these reviews include those from Ewing, Andrew Baer of No Ripcord, and Will Hermes of Rolling Stone. Ewing believed that the Weeknd's vocals and lyrics were not strong by "R&B standards", Baer believed its sound to not be innovative, while Hermes thought the mixtape could have spawned hit songs if the Weeknd improved lyrically and sonically. Dom Sinacola of Cokemachineglow said the project "lack[ed] dynamism".

=== Accolades and rankings ===
On July 6, 2011, House of Balloons became a 2011 Polaris Music Prize shortlist nominee. The mixtape appeared in 26 publications' lists of the best projects of 2011. Those that listed House of Balloons include Complex (1st), Fact (1st), Stereogum (5th), The A.V. Club (6th), Billboard (7th), The Guardian (8th), Pitchfork (10th), and Spin (13th). The mixtape ranked 13th on The Village Voice's Pazz & Jop mass critics' poll.

Two publications ranked House of Balloons on their lists of the best projects of the 21st century; Complex ranked it at number 10 and Rolling Stone at number 99. It also appeared on some lists of the best albums of the 2010s; it was ranked by Slant Magazine at 84, Pitchfork at 75, Vice at 40, and Billboard at 20. Additionally, Jem Aswad of Variety and Josiah Gogarty of GQ mentioned the mixtape on their own personal lists.

== Commercial performance ==
House of Balloons did not appear on the Billboard 200 until more than ten years after its release, debuting at 113 on the chart dated February 26, 2022. The mixtape sold 10,000 album-equivalent units and its entry on the chart was caused by a vinyl reissue. The same week, it charted at number four on the Vinyl Albums chart and at number ten on the Top Album Sales chart. On the Top R&B/Hip-Hop Albums, House of Balloons peaked at number 37 on the chart dated September 19, 2015. Internationally, House of Balloons peaked at number one in Greece, number 12 on the United Kingdom's R&B Albums Chart, number 40 in Belgium's Wallonia chart, number 80 in Lithuania, and number 120 in Portugal. The project was certified platinum in Canada and the UK, and gold in Australia.

== Legacy ==
=== Use of anonymity ===
When the Weeknd released House of Balloons, he remained anonymous, creating speculation on his identity; some commentators believed he was a group rather than a solo artist. With this mystique, combined with his rare public appearances, audiences had only a mysterious persona to latch onto, making his music their main focus and fueling his popularity growth. Speaking on his anonymity, the Weeknd said he believed his physical appearance made him unmarketable for the R&B genre, preferring to be judged for his music.

Billboard attributed his approach to anonymity, described as using striking art direction with a mysterious identity, with inspiring artists such as PartyNextDoor, H.E.R., and Dvsn to do the same. According to New Zealand singer Lorde, she attempted to emulate the Weeknd's "cryptic ... rollouts" when she released her debut extended play (EP) The Love Club (2012). Uproxx's Bianca Gracie said the Weeknd's mystique inspired a generation of people to conceal their faces on social media posts, wanting to not be seen.

=== Musical influence ===
It was in March of 2011 that Abel Tesfaye jump-started an r'n'b evolution ... A vibrant, rich, and engaging landscape that has not only become a focal point within pop culture at large, but one that dictates other sonic trends while keeping a firm grasp on the listening-public's interest.

— Rose Lilah, HotNewHipHop (2022)

Publications have stated House of Balloons changed the R&B genre. Prior to the mixtape's release, R&B music in the late 2000s decade consisted mainly of upbeat, synth-infused tracks that borrowed elements from snap music. House of Balloons contrasted with much of the genre's status quo, using dark production, lyricism, and vocals rather than a glossy, respectable sound. Turning R&B into a dark, guilty pleasure attracted a new community of fans towards the Weeknd, while other artists now had opportunities to break rules.

Uproxx stated critics who earlier negatively viewed R&B were now praising the genre after the mixtape's release. While revisiting it in a retrospective analysis, Sam-Hockley Smith of The Fader stated the project made upbeat songs outdated and "lame", which he believed contributed to its influence on music. Smith also stated due to House of Balloons' success, everyone, including the Weeknd himself, attempted but failed to replicate the mixtape's sadness. Rolling Stone attributed the mixtape's "murky" and sexually explicit sound as the inspiration behind 12 tracks from artists ranging from Justin Bieber to SZA. American singer Usher's 2012 single "Climax", which is mentioned in the Rolling Stone article, was confirmed by the song's producer, Diplo, to have been influenced by the production in House of Balloons.

== Track listing ==
House of Balloons standard edition
No.	Title	Writer(s)	Producer(s)	Length
1.	"High for This"	Abel Tesfaye; Adrien Gough; Henry Walter	The Dream Machine	4:07
2.	"What You Need"	Tesfaye; Jeremy Rose	Rose; The Weeknd	3:26
3.	"House of Balloons / Glass Table Girls"	Tesfaye; Martin McKinney; Carlo Montagnese; Susan Ballion; Peter Clarke; John McGeoch; Steven Severin	Doc McKinney; Illangelo	6:47
4.	"The Morning"	Tesfaye; McKinney; Montagnese	Doc McKinney; Illangelo	5:15
5.	"Wicked Games"	Tesfaye; McKinney; Montagnese; Rainer Millar-Blanchaer	Doc McKinney; Illangelo	5:25
6.	"The Party & the After Party"	Tesfaye; Rose; Millar-Blanchaer; Victoria Legrand; Alex Scally	Rose; The Weeknd; Millar-Blanchaer	7:39
7.	"Coming Down"	Tesfaye; McKinney; Montagnese	Doc McKinney; Illangelo	4:55
8.	"Loft Music"	Tesfaye; Rose; Legrand; Scally	Rose; The Weeknd	6:04
9.	"The Knowing"	Tesfaye; McKinney; Montagnese; Elizabeth Fraser; Robin Guthrie; Simon Raymonde	Doc McKinney; Illangelo	5:41
Total length:				49:19

2012 reissue bonus track
No.	Title	Writer(s)	Producer(s)	Length
10.	"Twenty Eight"	Tesfaye; McKinney; Montagnese	McKinney; Illangelo	4:18
Total length:				53:37

Samples

- "What You Need" contains a sample of "Rock the Boat" performed by Aaliyah not present on the Trilogy release.
- "House of Balloons / Glass Table Girls" contains a sample of "Happy House" performed by Siouxsie and the Banshees.
- "The Party & the After Party" contains a sample of "Master of None" performed by Beach House.
- "Coming Down" contains a voice sample from the anime Fate/stay night not present on the Trilogy release.
- "Loft Music" contains a sample of "Gila" performed by Beach House.
- "The Knowing" contains a sample of "Cherry-Coloured Funk" performed by Cocteau Twins.

== Personnel ==
- Abel Tesfaye (The Weeknd) – lead vocals, songwriting/composition, additional production (all tracks)
- Carlo Montagnese (Illangelo) – mixing (all tracks), production (tracks 3–5, 7, 9 & 10), songwriting/composition (tracks 3–5, 7, 9 & 10), recording engineer (tracks 3–10),
- Martin McKinney (Doc McKinney) – production (tracks 3–5, 7, 9 & 10), songwriting/composition (tracks 3–5, 7 9 & 10) recording engineer (tracks 3–10)
- Henry Walter (Cirkut) − production, songwriting, recording engineer (track 1)
- Jeremy Rose − production (tracks 2, 6 & 8), songwriting (tracks 2, 4, 6 & 8), recording engineer (track 2)
- Matthew Acton − assistant recording engineer (tracks 3, 4, 6–9)
- William Brock − guitar (track 4)
- Rainer Millar Blanchaer − songwriting (tracks 5 & 6), production (track 6)
- Adrian "Adrian X" Eccleston – guitar (track 9)
- Shin Kamiyama – assistant recording engineer (track 10)

== Charts ==
=== Weekly charts ===
Weekly chart performance of House of Balloons
Chart (2015–2026)	Peak position
Belgian Albums (Ultratop Flanders)	101
Belgian Albums (Ultratop Wallonia)	40
Greek Albums (IFPI)	1
Irish Albums (IRMA)	66
Lithuanian Albums (AGATA)	80
Portuguese Albums (AFP)	72
Swedish Physical Albums (Sverigetopplistan)	15
Scottish Albums (Official Charts)	73
UK Albums Streaming (Official Charts)	99
UK R&B Albums (Official Charts)	12
US Billboard 200	99
US Top R&B/Hip-Hop Albums (Billboard)	32

=== Year-end charts ===
Year-end chart performance of House of Balloons
Chart (2025)	Position
US Billboard 200	200
US Top R&B/Hip-Hop Albums (Billboard)	85

== Certifications ==
Certifications for House of Balloons
Region	Certification	Certified units/sales
Australia (ARIA)	Gold	35,000^{‡}
Canada (Music Canada)	Platinum	80,000^{‡}
Denmark (IFPI Danmark)	Gold	10,000^{‡}
United Kingdom (BPI)	Platinum	300,000^{‡}
^{‡} Sales+streaming figures based on certification alone.

== Release history ==
Release dates and formats for House of Balloons
Region	Date	Label(s)	Format(s)	Edition	Ref.
Various	March 21, 2011	XO	Digital download; streaming	9-track free of charge	
Various	August 14, 2015	XO; Republic	LP	10-track remastered	
Various	March 21, 2021	XO; Republic	Digital download; streaming; LP	Original 9-track	
