= Illangelo =

Canadian music producer (born 1987)

- Born: Carlo Montagnese; July 29, 1987 (age 39)
- Origin: Calgary, Alberta, Canada
- Genres: Alternative R&B; electronica; trip hop
- Occupations: Disc jockey; record producer; songwriter; audio engineer
- Years active: 2010–present
- Publisher: XO Publishing Group
- Formerly of: Somewhere Else
- Website: illangelo.com

Carlo Montagnese (born July 29, 1987), known professionally as Illangelo, is a Canadian DJ, record producer, songwriter and sound mixer, known for his early work with singer the Weeknd. Having executive produced his 2011 mixtapes compiled in his Trilogy (2012) album, Montagnese has served as a frequent contributor for several of his subsequent releases. Apart from his work with the Toronto native, his other notable credits include Post Malone's "I Fall Apart", Fall Out Boy's "The Last of the Real Ones", Wiz Khalifa's "Remember You", Drake's "Crew Love", Ricky Hil's "Nomads", and remixes such as Lady Gaga's "Marry the Night (The Weeknd and Illangelo remix)" and Florence and the Machine's "Shake It Out" (The Weeknd remix). He was one half of the duo Somewhere Else with collaborator Billy Walsh, and signed with Skrillex's OWSLA label and Brodinski's Bromance Records to release his debut concept album, History of Man (2013).

== Early life ==
Illangelo grew up in Calgary, Alberta. After doing music there for 8 years, he says, "It came to a point where I realized I was not going to reach my goal of what I wanted to do with my life. I realized I ha[d] to go to Toronto." He moved to Toronto in 2010, saved up some money, and gave himself "one year to make [it] happen."

== Career ==
In December 2010, Illangelo and The Weeknd connected in Toronto and did "Crew Love", making it the first time he got to work with an artist that he genuinely loved and admired. Illangelo thought he would have to move back to Calgary as his money ran out, but then began to work on House of Balloons with producer Doc McKinney and The Weeknd. In January 2011, Drake decided to take "Crew Love" for his upcoming album. 2012 was spent working mainly on The Weeknd's Trilogy.

On August 20, 2013, Illangelo released his debut concept album titled History of Man, which he describes as "a literary, visual and audio narrative inspired by the epic poem Paradise Lost by 17th-century English poet John Milton".

Illangelo released a single titled "What The Fuss" on February 18, 2014, which features up and coming Toronto native Rochelle Jordan. Earlier that month, he released a series of demos from the pre-House of Balloons era (circa 2010) on his Bandcamp page.

On May 2, 2014, Illangelo collaborated with the Sydney trio Movement on their self titled debut EP. Their self-described style of minimal soul in combination with Illangelo's futuristic sound created a unique texture that has since been gaining much momentum selling out their Australian tour and several dates across the US and Europe. Additionally "Like Lust" and "Ivory" went on receive back to back Best New Track on Pitchfork.

Illangelo released his single "Clockwork", featuring vocalist Phlo Finister, on May 12, 2014. Shortly after he released a video with Los Angeles filmmaker Lance Drake. It has since gotten Staff Picked on Vimeo.

In an interview with Earmilk on July 1, 2014, Illangelo announced that he and Phlo Finister had created a band together called Youthquaker. The group's first release "Projections", containing 3 songs, was released via a BitTorrent Bundle. The songs were downloaded over 900,000 times in the first week of release.

== Discography ==
=== Singles produced ===
List of singles as either producer or co-producer, with selected chart positions and certifications, showing year released, performing artists and album name
| Title | Year | Peak chart positions | | | | | | Album |
| Title | Year | CAN | UK | UK R&B | US | US R&B/HH | US R&B | Album |
|---|---|---|---|---|---|---|---|---|
| "Crew Love" (Drake featuring The Weeknd) | 2012 | 80 | 37 | 7 | 80 | 9 | — | Take Care |
| "Wicked Games" (The Weeknd) | 2012 | 43 | 152 | 18 | 53 | 13 | 5 | Trilogy |
| "Twenty Eight" (The Weeknd) | 2012 | — | 150 | 25 | — | — | — | Trilogy |
| "The Zone" (The Weeknd featuring Drake) | 2012 | — | — | — | — | — | — | Trilogy |
| "The Hills" (The Weeknd) | 2015 | 1 | 3 | 1 | 1 | 1 | 1 | Beauty Behind the Madness |
| "My Love" (Majid Jordan featuring Drake) | 2015 | — | — | — | — | — | — | Majid Jordan |
| "Tell Your Friends" (The Weeknd) | 2015 | 44 | 74 | 15 | 54 | 19 | 6 | Beauty Behind the Madness |
| "Something About You" (Majid Jordan) | 2015 | — | — | — | — | — | — | Majid Jordan |
| "In Common" (Alicia Keys) | 2016 | — | 89 | 20 | 104 | 42 | 13 | Here |
| "I Fall Apart" (Post Malone) | 2017 | 20 | 19 | 7 | 16 | 9 | — | Stoney |
| "The Last of the Real Ones" (Fall Out Boy) | 2018 | — | 84 | — | 123 | — | — | M A N I A |
| "Heartless" (The Weeknd) | 2019 | 3 | 10 | 3 | 1 | 1 | 1 | After Hours |
| "After Hours" (The Weeknd) | 2020 | 14 | 20 | 9 | 20 | 10 | 4 | After Hours |
| "Player of Games" (Grimes) | 2021 | — | — | — | — | — | — | TBA |
| "Shinigami Eyes" (Grimes) | 2022 | — | — | — | — | — | — | TBA |
| "Ain't Ready" (Santigold) | 2022 | — | — | — | — | — | — | Spirituals |
| "TONTA" (Nathy Peluso) | 2023 | — | — | — | — | — | — | Tonta |
| "SALVAJE" (Nathy Peluso) | 2023 | — | — | — | — | — | — | SALVAJE |
| "K-POP" (Travis Scott, Bad Bunny, The Weeknd) | 2023 | 14 | 24 | 21 | 7 | 2 | — | K-POP |
| "I WANNA BE SOFTWARE" (Grimes, Illangelo) | 2023 | | | | | | | I WANNA BE SOFTWARE |
| "Waiting On The World" (Bob Moses) | 2025 | | | | | | | BLINK |
"—" denotes a recording that did not chart or was not released in that territory.

=== Full discography ===
List of songs as either producer, co-producer, engineer or mixing, showing year released, performing artists and album name
| Title | Year | Album |
|---|---|---|
| "Zambony" (Illangelo Remix) (k-os) | 2010 | The Anchorman Mixtape |
| "Night Flight" "Born To Be" "Maybe" "Ice Age" "La Rude, Lord of the Flies" "Gold Ribbons" "Party & Bullshit" "Gorgeous Flaws" (The Airplane Boys) | 2011 | Where You've Been |
| "High For This" "What You Need" "House of Balloons / Glass Table Girls" "The Morning" "Wicked Games" "The Party & The After Party" "Coming Down" "Loft Music" "The Knowing" (The Weeknd) | 2011 | House of Balloons |
| "Trust Issues (The Weeknd Remix)" (The Weeknd) | 2011 | Take Care |
| "Lonely Star" "Life of the Party" "Thursday" "The Zone" "The Birds (Part 1)" "The Birds (Part 2)" "Gone" "Rolling Stone" "Heaven or Las Vegas" (The Weeknd) | 2011 | Thursday |
| "Shake It Out" (The Weeknd Remix) (Florence and the Machine) | 2011 | Ceremonials |
| "Marry the Night" (The Weeknd & Illangelo Remix) (Lady Gaga) | 2011 | Born This Way: The Remix |
| "D.D." "Montreal" "Outside" "XO / The Host" "Initiation" "Same Old Song" "The Fall" "Next" "Echoes of Silence" (The Weeknd) | 2011 | Echoes of Silence |
| "Crew Love" (Drake featuring The Weeknd) | 2012 | Take Care |
| "Numb" (The Airplane Boys) | 2012 | Alignment |
| "I'd Die" "Woman" "Lonely Guy" "Peace Tonight" "Colors" "Mercy Me" "No Stones" (TALWST) | 2012 | Alien Tentacle Sex |
| "Remember You" (Wiz Khalifa) | 2012 | O.N.I.F.C |
| "High For This" "What You Need" "House of Balloons / Glass Table Girls" "The Morning" "Wicked Games" "The Party & The After Party" "Coming Down" "Loft Music" "The Knowing" "Twenty Eight" "Lonely Star" "Life of the Party" "Thursday" "The Zone" "The Birds (Part 1)" "The Birds (Part 2)" "Gone" "Rolling Stone" "Heaven Or Las Vegas" "Valerie" "D.D." "Montreal" "Outside" "XO / The Host" "Initiation" "Same Old Song" "The Fall" "Next" "Echoes of Silence" "Till Dawn (Here Comes the Sun)" (The Weeknd) | 2012 | Trilogy |
| "Nomads" (featuring The Weeknd) (Ricky Hil) | 2013 | SYLDD (Support Your Local Drug Dealer) |
| "One Dreamy Hum" "Crash Landing" "The Escape" "Farewell" "The Haunting" "War" "Seven Phases" "A Strange World" "Shattered Paradise" "The Forsaken Ones" (Illangelo) | 2013 | History of Man |
| "Exodus" "Sexodus" (M.I.A.) | 2013 | Matangi |
| "Time Travel" (Daley) | 2014 | Days + Nights |
| "What The Fuss" (Illangelo x Rochelle Jordan) | 2014 | Illangelo x Rochelle Jordan |
| "Like Lust" "Ivory" "5:57" "Control You" (MOVEMENT) | 2014 | MOVEMENT – EP |
| "Clockwork" (Illangelo ft. Phlo Finister) | 2014 | Illangelo ft. Phlo Finister |
| "Alone" (Illangelo x Chuck Ellis) | 2014 | Illangelo x Chuck Ellis |
| "Losers" (featuring Labrinth) "Tell Your Friends" "The Hills" "Acquainted" "As You Are" "Dark Times" (featuring Ed Sheeran) "Prisoner" (featuring Lana Del Rey) (The Weeknd) | 2015 | Beauty Behind the Madness |
| "Learn From Each Other" "My Love" "Something About You" (Majid Jordan) | 2016 | Majid Jordan |
| "In Common" (Alicia Keys) | 2016 | Here (Deluxe Version) |
| "Not Nice" (PartyNextDoor) | 2016 | PartyNextDoor 3 |
| "I Fall Apart" "Hit This Hard" (Post Malone) | 2016 | Stoney |
| "Starlight" (Emeli Sandé) | 2017 | Kingdom Coming EP |
| "Pendulum" (Katy Perry) | 2017 | Witness |
| "The Last of the Real Ones" (Fall Out Boy) | 2018 | M A N I A |
| "Better Alone" (Lykke Li) | 2018 | So Sad So Sexy |
| "Imaginary Friend" (MØ) | 2018 | Forever Neverland |
| "a lily or a rose" "never pretends" "it's beauty is that" (Illangelo) | 2018 | it is what it is |
| "Alone Again" "Too Late" "Snowchild" "Escape from LA" "Heartless" "Faith" "After Hours" (The Weeknd) | 2020 | After Hours |

== Awards and nominations ==
| Year | Awards | Work | Category | Result |
|---|---|---|---|---|
| 2016 | Grammy Awards | Beauty Behind the Madness | Album of the Year | Nominated |
| 2016 | Grammy Awards | Beauty Behind the Madness | Best Urban Contemporary Album | Won |
