= Doc McKinney =

Canadian-American record producer (born 1971)

- Born: Martin McKinney; August 27, 1971 (age 55); Canada
- Origin: Minneapolis, Minnesota, U.S.
- Occupations: Record producer; songwriter
- Formerly of: Esthero

Martin "Doc" McKinney (born August 27, 1971) is a Grammy award winning Canadian-American record producer and songwriter. He was formerly one half of the duo (now solo act) Esthero. McKinney is widely credited with developing The Weeknd's sound as well as producing his mixtapes House of Balloons and Thursday; and executive producing and producing the majority of his third album Starboy (2016), which earned McKinney the 2016 Grammy Award for Best Urban Contemporary Album.

== Life and career ==
Born in Canada and raised in Minneapolis, McKinney was exposed to the Twin Cities indie scene. During his adolescent years, McKinney played in various punk rock and hip hop based groups. While the cities' most influential contributions came out of the 1980s, McKinney was immersed in the music scene of that decade.

McKinney settled in Toronto in 1994, as an aspiring producer. McKinney was introduced to Jenny Bea Englishman – now known as "Esthero" – which led him to becoming one half of the then duo. The introduction was headed up by then EMI Publishing President, Michael McCarty. After producing and writing all the music to their entire breakthrough album Breath From Another, McKinney left the group and Esthero kept the groups name and became a solo act. She remained with Sony until 2000 when she was released from contract and went on to sign with Warner/Reprise where she was ultimately released again from the contract. McKinney went on to produce Res – and co writing her critically acclaimed album, How I Do, alongside Santi White (Santigold). McKinney has since worked with Santi White (Santigold) on various projects, including her 2008 release of her Solid Gold Mixtape.

Since then, McKinney has had the opportunity to work with Sting, Drake, Kelis, Dr. Dre, G-Love, Raphael Saadiq, Mary J. Blige, Sinéad O'Connor, Alice Smith, Amanda Blank, Trouble Andrew, Ali Shaheed Muhammad (A Tribe Called Quest), Hawksley Workman as well as Latin artists Belinda, RBD and Debi Nova.

== Personal life ==
McKinney is a supporter of War Child (charity), GEM's – Girls Educational and Mentoring Services, and Red Hot Organization (AIDS Awareness). As an appreciation of his support, he donates his work as a producer/songwriter/engineer.

== Selected production discography ==
Release date	Album title	Artist	Song titles	Label
1995	Single	k-os	Rise Like The Sun	Independent
1998	Breath from Another	Esthero	All Songs	Work/Sony Music
2001	How I Do	RES	All Songs	MCA/Universal
2002	Red Hot and Riot	Kelis	So Be It; Red Hot	MCA
2002	Instant Vintage	Raphael Saadiq	Tek 2 Pookie	Universal Music
2002	Sex Sells	Stiffed	Wathca Gonna Go; Nighttime Lovin	Coolhunter/Ryko
2003	Lover, Fighter	Hawksley Workman	Smoke Baby	Isadora Records/Universal Records
2003	Peace Songs	k-os	Livin In A World Corrupt	Isadora Records/Universal Music
2004	Sacred Love	Sting (musician) feat. will.i.am	Stolen Car (Remix)	Interscope Records/Universal Music
2005	Wikked Lil' Grrrls	Esthero	Wikked Lil Grrrls; If Tha Mood; Fastlane; Bad Boy Clyde	Reprise/Wea
2005	Burned Again	Stiffed (band)	Run	Outlook
2006	Utopia	Belinda (entertainer)	Contigo O Sin Ti	EMI/Televisa
2007	Buck The World	Young Buck feat. Chester Bennington (Linkin Park)	Slow Ya Roll	G-Unit/Interscope Records/Universal Records
2008	Solid Gold Mixtape	Santigold	Guns of Brooklyn	Downtown Records/Universal Records
2008	Between The Beautifuls	Hawksley Workman	Prettier Face; Piano Blink	Isadora Records/Universal Records
2008	Los Manlicious	Hawksley Workman	Pretty Girls; Lonely People; In My Blood; Fatty Wants to Dance; Prettier Face; Piano Blink	Isadora Records/Universal Records
2009	Call and Response	Maroon 5	Best That We Break (Remix)	Interscope Records/Universal Records
2009	Shame On Me	Amanda Blank	I Love You	Downtown Records/Universal Records
2009	Para Olvdarte De Mi	RBD	Camino Al Sol	EMI/Telivisa
2009	Girls Educational and Mentoring Services	Mary J. Blige and Sinéad O'Connor	This Is To Mother You	Independent
2010	Luna Nueva	Debi Nova	We Were Young; Don't Wanna Forget	Decca Records/Universal Records
2010	Dreams of a Troubled Man	Trouble Andrew	Stop Me; Condition; Wasted; Cadillac; Flaunts It; Oh No	Virgin Records
2010	Stray Bullets	Cee Lo Green	"Champain"	Mixtape
2011	House of Balloons	The Weeknd	Producer	Independent
2011	Thursday	The Weeknd	Producer	Independent
2011	Take Care	Drake	"The Ride"	Young Money, Cash Money, Universal Republic
2011	Shake It Out	Florence and The Machine	"Shake it Out" The Weeknd Remix	Island Records
2011	Free Download	The Weeknd	"Trust Issues" The Weeknd Remix	Independent
2012	TBD	Yadi	" Guillotine Remix"	Warner UK
2012	Trilogy	The Weeknd	Producer/Executive Producer	XO, Universal Republic
2014	Free Download	Spooky Black	"Reason"	Independent
2016	Starboy	The Weeknd	Executive Producer	XO, Universal Republic
2019	Non-album track	JoJo	Sabotage	Warner Records, Clover Music
2020	Good to Know	JoJo	So Bad; Lonely Hearts	Warner Records, Clover Music
