= List of songs recorded by the Weeknd =

Canadian singer and songwriter The Weeknd has released material for six studio albums, one extended play, three mixtapes, two soundtrack albums, one live album, one promotional live album, three compilation albums, (including two greatest hits albums), one remix album, 82 single releases (including 21 as a featured artist) and seven promotional singles (including two as a featured artist), as well as contribute to other artist's respective albums.

He began his recording career in 2009 by anonymously releasing music on YouTube. Two years later, he co-founded the XO record label and released his first three mixtapes House of Balloons, Thursday and Echoes of Silence. He collaborated with different songwriters and producers, primarily Doc McKinney and Illangelo. The alternative R&B projects were met with widespread acclaim for its dark lyrical content that explored the Weeknd's drug usage and romantic experiences. They were also praised for its diverse musical styles, which incorporated elements of soul, trip hop, hip hop, dream pop, indie rock, downtempo and post-punk. After signing with Republic Records in 2012, the Weeknd re-released his three mixtapes in the compilation album Trilogy. Preceding the album was the release of his debut single "Wicked Games", an alternative R&B and quiet storm track that he co-wrote with McKinney and Illangelo. Follow-up singles included "Twenty Eight" and "The Zone" featuring Drake.

The Weeknd's debut studio album Kiss Land was released in September 2013. It was supported by six singles, including the lead single of the same name and "Belong to the World". Primarily a R&B and dark wave album, the Weeknd worked with new collaborators for Kiss Land such as DaHeala, DannyBoyStyles and Belly.

The Weeknd's second studio album Beauty Behind the Madness was released in August 2015. He reunited with Belly, DaHeala, DannyBoyStyles and Illangelo, and worked with new collaborators such as Max Martin, Kanye West and Ed Sheeran. The album was supported by five singles, including "The Hills", an alternative R&B and trap song that incorporates Amharic lyricism, and "Can't Feel My Face", a pop, disco and funk track. Both singles reached number one on the US Billboard Hot 100. Beauty Behind the Madness featured guest appearances from Ed Sheeran, Labrinth and Lana Del Rey.

In November 2016, the Weeknd released Starboy, a R&B, pop and trap record that included the lead single of the same name and "I Feel It Coming", with both singles featuring first-time collaborators Daft Punk. The album featured guest appearances from Kendrick Lamar, Future and Lana Del Rey. The Weeknd reunited with Doc McKinney and Belly, while working with new collaborators such as Cirkut.

In March 2018, the Weeknd released his first EP My Dear Melancholy, which combined contemporary and alternative R&B with electropop. Primarily produced by and written with Frank Dukes, the EP contained contributions from Guy-Manuel de Homem-Christo, Mike Will Made It, Starrah and Skrillex. It was supported by one single, "Call Out My Name", and featured a guest appearance from Gesaffelstein.

In March 2020, the Weeknd released his fourth studio album After Hours, which served as a re-introduction of new wave and dream pop sounds combined with electropop and synth-pop sounds. The album was supported by four singles, including "Heartless" and "Blinding Lights". Both singles reached number one on the Billboard Hot 100, with the latter becoming the longest-charting single in the chart's history at the time of its release. Lyrically, After Hours contains themes of promiscuity, overindulgence and self-loathing. The Weeknd reunited with former collaborators DaHeala, Belly, Illangelo and Max Martin.

In January 2022, the Weeknd released his dance-pop inspired fifth studio album Dawn FM, having OPN, Max Martin and Oscar Holter as prominent collaborators.

From June to July 2023, the Weeknd released six EPs for the HBO drama television series The Idol (which he also created and starred in), primarily collaborating with Mike Dean.

The Weeknd's sixth studio album Hurry Up Tomorrow was released in January 2025, having Mike Dean, OPN and Sage Skolfield as prominent collaborators, while working with a wide variety of producers such as Max Martin, Oscar Holter, Swedish House Mafia, Pharrell Williams, Metro Boomin, DaHeala, Cirkut, Justice and Giorgio Moroder.

In addition to his studio work, the Weeknd has recorded songs for film soundtracks, including featuring on Sia's single "Elastic Heart" from The Hunger Games: Catching Fire (2013), "Earned It", a chamber pop and R&B track from Fifty Shades of Grey (2015), "Pray For Me", a pop-rap track with Kendrick Lamar for Black Panther (2018)., and "Nothing Is Lost (You Give Me Strength)", a synth-pop and electro-R&B track from Avatar: The Way of Water (2022). The Weeknd collaborated with OPN for the score of Hurry Up Tomorrow (2025).

== Commercially released songs ==
The Weeknd discography
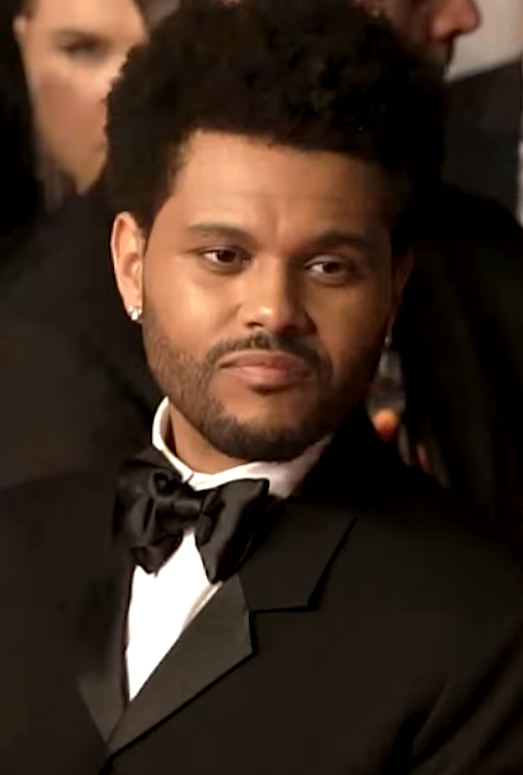
- The Weeknd in 2023
- Artist credits: 233
- Non-artist credits: 24

For this article, a song is considered released commercially if it was released under a record label.

=== Credited as performer ===
The table below lists all commercially released works by or featuring the Weeknd, where he is credited as a performer. For each original version, the performer(s), songwriter(s), producer(s), and album(s) are identified, along with the release date of its first official commercial appearance—whether as a single, part of an album, or a non-album release. The "other releases" column includes only commercially released alternate versions of the same song by the Weeknd, such as radio or single edits, live recordings, remixes, extended mixes, sped-up or slowed-down versions, instrumentals, a cappellas, and acoustic renditions. Re-releases of tracks on other (compilation) albums are intentionally excluded.

As of December 11, 2026, the Weeknd is credited on 233 distinct song titles: 124 solo tracks and 109 collaborations (including 37 as a featured artist), encompassing 360 commercially released versions in total. He holds writing credits on nearly all of them.

Keys
†	Indicates song released as single
^{ft.}	Indicates featured artist
^{co.}	Indicates co-producer
^{ad.}	Indicates additional producer

List of commercially released songs, crediting The Weeknd as performer
Song	Original					Other releases	Ref(s)
Song	Performer(s)	Songwriter(s)	Producer(s)	Album(s)	First release	Other releases	Ref(s)
"6 Inch"	Beyoncé; The Weeknd ^{ft.}	Abel Tesfaye; Beyoncé Knowles; Danny Schofield; Benjamin Diehl; Terius Nash; Ahmad Balshe; Jordan Asher; David Portner; Noah Lennox; Brian Weitz; Burt Bacharach; Hal David	DannyBoyStyles; Ben Billions; Beyoncé; Boots; Derek Dixie ^{ad.}	Lemonade	April 23, 2016		
"A Lesser Man"	The Weeknd	Abel Tesfaye; Michael Dean; Samuel Levinson	The Weeknd; Mike Dean; Metro Boomin ^{co.}	The Idol Episode 3 (Music from the HBO Original Series)	June 19, 2023		
"A Lie" †	French Montana; The Weeknd ^{ft.} Max B ^{ft.}	Karim Kharbouch; Abel Tesfaye; Charly Wingate; Rory Quigley; Jason Quenneville; Danny Schofield; Matt Carillo; Fred Lowinger; Russ Mitkowski; Matthew Quinones	Harry Fraud; DaHeala ^{ad.} DannyBoyStyles ^{ad.} Masar ^{ad.}	Jungle Rules	July 14, 2017		
"A Lonely Night"	The Weeknd	Abel Tesfaye; Max Martin; Peter Svensson; Savan Kotecha; Ali Payami; Ahmad Balshe; Jason Quenneville	Ali Payami; Max Martin	Starboy	November 25, 2016		
"A Tale By Quincy"	The Weeknd	Abel Tesfaye; Quincy Jones; Daniel Lopatin; Jeff Gitelman	The Weeknd; OPN; Max Martin; Gitty	Dawn FM	January 7, 2022		
"Acquainted" †	The Weeknd	Abel Tesfaye; Jason Quenneville; Danny Schofield; Carlo Montagnese; Benjamin Diehl	Ben Billions; Illangelo; DaHeala; DannyBoyStyles; The Weeknd	Beauty Behind the Madness	August 28, 2015		
"Adaptation"	The Weeknd	Abel Tesfaye; Ahmad Balshe; Danny Schofield; Jason Quenneville; Sting	DannyBoyStyles; The Weeknd; DaHeala	Kiss Land	September 10, 2013		
"After Hours" †	The Weeknd	Abel Tesfaye; Jason Quenneville; Ahmad Balshe; Carlo Montagnese; Mario Winans	The Weeknd; Illangelo; DaHeala; Mario Winans ^{ad.}	After Hours	February 19, 2020	The Blaze Remix on After Hours (Remixes) (2020); Live version on Live at SoFi Stadium (2023)	
"All I Know"	The Weeknd; Future ^{ft.}	Abel Tesfaye; Nayvadius Wilburn; Benjamin Diehl; Magnus Høiberg; Ahmad Balshe	Ben Billions; Cashmere Cat; The Weeknd	Starboy	November 25, 2016		
"All To Myself"	Future; Metro Boomin; The Weeknd	Nayvadius Wilburn; Leland Wayne; Abel Tesfaye; Michael Dean	Metro Boomin; Mike Dean	We Still Don't Trust You	April 12, 2024		
"Alone Again"	The Weeknd	Abel Tesfaye; Jason Quenneville; Carlo Montagnese; Adam Feeney	The Weeknd; Illangelo; DaHeala; Frank Dukes ^{co.}	After Hours	March 20, 2020	Live version on Live at SoFi Stadium (2023)	
"Always Be My Fault"	Future; Metro Boomin; The Weeknd	Nayvadius Wilburn; Leland Wayne; Abel Tesfaye; Michael Dean; Allen Ritter; Mejdi Rhars	Metro Boomin; Mike Dean; Allen Ritter; Prince 85	We Still Don't Trust You	April 12, 2024		
"Angel"	The Weeknd	Abel Tesfaye; Stephan Moccio; Danny Schofield; Benjamin Diehl	Stephan Moccio; The Weeknd	Beauty Behind the Madness	August 28, 2015		
"Anima Pt. 1"	The Weeknd; Oneohtrix Point Never	Abel Tesfaye; Daniel Lopatin	The Weeknd; OPN	Hurry Up Tomorrow (Original Motion Picture Score)	July 11, 2025		
"Anima Pt. 2"	The Weeknd; Oneohtrix Point Never	Abel Tesfaye; Daniel Lopatin	The Weeknd; OPN	Hurry Up Tomorrow (Original Motion Picture Score)	July 11, 2025		
"Another One of Me" †	Diddy; The Weeknd; French Montana; 21 Savage	Sean Combs; Abel Tesfaye; Karim Kharbouch; Shéyaa Abraham-Joseph; Carlos Coleman; Uforo Ebong; Jason Quenneville; Eric Hudson; Roark Bailey; DeForrest Taylor	Diddy; BongoByTheWay; DaHeala; Eric Hudson; Roark Bailey; DeForrest Taylor	The Love Album: Off the Grid	September 15, 2023		
"As You Are"	The Weeknd	Abel Tesfaye; Ahmad Balshe; Danny Schofield; Jason Quenneville; Carlo Montagnese	DaHeala; Illangelo; DannyBoyStyles; Ben Billions; The Weeknd	Beauty Behind the Madness	August 28, 2015		
"Attention"	The Weeknd	Abel Tesfaye; William Walsh; Benjamin Levin; Magnus Høiberg; Adam Feeney; Mustafa Ahmed	Benny Blanco; Cashmere Cat; Frank Dukes; The Weeknd	Starboy	November 25, 2016		
"Baptized in Fear"	The Weeknd	Abel Tesfaye; Daniel Lopatin; Nathan Salon	The Weeknd; Mike Dean; OPN; Nathan Salon; Sage Skolfield ^{ad.}	Hurry Up Tomorrow	January 31, 2025		
"Bedtime Stories"	Rae Sremmurd; The Weeknd ^{ft.}	Aaquil Brown; Khalif Brown; Abel Tesfaye; Marquel Middlebrooks; Michael Williams	Marz; Mike Will Made It	SR3MM	May 4, 2018		
"Belong to the World" †	The Weeknd	Abel Tesfaye; Ahmad Balshe; Danny Schofield; Jason Quenneville	DannyBoyStyles; The Weeknd; DaHeala	Kiss Land	July 16, 2013		
"Best Friends"	The Weeknd	Abel Tesfaye; Jason Quenneville	The Weeknd; DaHeala; OPN ^{ad.} Max Martin ^{ad.} Oscar Holter ^{ad.} Matt Cohn ^{ad.}	Dawn FM	January 7, 2022	Remix with Summer Walker on Dawn FM (Alternate World) (2022)	
"Better Believe" †	Belly; The Weeknd; Young Thug	Ahmad Balshe; Abel Tesfaye; Jeffery Williams; Xavier Dotson; Danny Schofield; Richard Muñoz; Faris Al-Majed	Zaytoven; DannyBoyStyles; The ANMLS	See You Next Wednesday	July 22, 2021		
"Big Sleep"	The Weeknd; Giorgio Moroder	Abel Tesfaye; Giorgio Moroder; Michael Dean; Daniel Lopatin; Mejdi Rhars; Nathan Salon	The Weeknd; Giorgio Moroder; Mike Dean; OPN; Prince85; Cirkut; Nathan Salon ^{co.} Sage Skolfield ^{ad.}	Hurry Up Tomorrow	January 31, 2025		
"Blinding Lights" †	The Weeknd	Abel Tesfaye; Ahmad Balshe; Jason Quenneville; Max Martin; Oscar Holter	The Weeknd; Max Martin; Oscar Holter	After Hours	November 29, 2019	Chromatics Remix on After Hours (Japanese Edition) (2020) and After Hours (Remixes) (2020); Major Lazer Remix on Blinding Lights (single) (2020); Instrumental on Blinding Lights (single) (2020); Acapella on Blinding Lights (single) (2020); Remix with Rosalía (2020); Live version on Live at SoFi Stadium (2023)	
"Call Out My Name" †	The Weeknd	Abel Tesfaye; Adam Feeney; Nicolas Jaar	Frank Dukes	My Dear Melancoly	March 30, 2018	Acapella version as Spotify bonus track on My Dear Melancholy (2018); Live version on Live at SoFi Stadium (2023)	
"Can You Hear Me Knocking?"	The Weeknd; Oneohtrix Point Never	Abel Tesfaye; Daniel Lopatin	The Weeknd; OPN	Hurry Up Tomorrow (Original Motion Picture Score)	July 11, 2025		
"Can't Feel My Face" †	The Weeknd	Abel Tesfaye; Ali Payami; Savan Kotecha; Max Martin; Peter Svensson	Max Martin; Ali Payami	Beauty Behind the Madness	June 8, 2015	Martin Garrix Remix on Beauty Behind the Madness (Japanese Edition) (2015); Live version on Live at SoFi Stadium (2023)	
"Champagne Solves Everything"	The Weeknd; Oneohtrix Point Never	Abel Tesfaye; Daniel Lopatin	The Weeknd; OPN	Hurry Up Tomorrow (Original Motion Picture Score)	July 11, 2025		
"Christmas Blues"	Sabrina Claudio; The Weeknd	Kaveh Rastegar; Abel Tesfaye; Mikhail Beltrain; Nasri Atweh; Sabrina Claudio	Kaveh Rastegar	Christmas Blues	November 27, 2020		
"Circus Maximus"	Travis Scott; The Weeknd ^{ft.} Swae Lee ^{ft.}	Jacques Webster; Abel Tesfaye; Khalif Brown; Noah Goldstein; Jahaan Sweet; Michael Dean; Gary Klebe	Travis Scott; Noah Goldstein; Jahaan Sweet ^{ad.} Mike Dean ^{ad.} WondaGurl ^{ad.}	Utopia	July 28, 2023		
"Close Encounter"	The Weeknd; Oneohtrix Point Never	Abel Tesfaye; Daniel Lopatin	The Weeknd; OPN	Hurry Up Tomorrow (Original Motion Picture Score)	July 11, 2025		
"Closing Night"	The Weeknd; Swedish House Mafia	Abel Tesfaye; Axel Hedfors; Steve Angello; Sebastian Ingrosso	The Weeknd; Swedish House Mafia	Hurry Up Tomorrow (Pharrell Williams Edition)	February 5, 2025		
"Come Thru"	Trouble; The Weeknd ^{ft.}	Mariel Orr; Abel Tesfaye; Michael Williams; Samuel Gloade; Aubrey Pottor	Mike Will Made It; 30 Roc; Aubz Made It ^{ad.}	Edgewood	March 23, 2018		
"Comin Out Strong"	Future; The Weeknd ^{ft.}	Nayvadius Wilburn; Abel Tesfaye; Noel Fisher; Henry Walter; Kevin Vincent	Cirkut; David Nakaji; High Klassified; Ivan Jimenez	Hndrxx	February 24, 2017		
"Coming Down"	The Weeknd	Abel Tesfaye; Martin McKinney; Carlo Montagnese	Doc McKinney; Illangelo	House of Balloons and Trilogy	March 21, 2011		
"Creepin'" †	Metro Boomin; The Weeknd; 21 Savage	Leland Wayne; Abel Tesfaye; Shéyaa Abraham-Joseph; Jason Quenneville; Peter Johnson; Johan Lenox; Mario Winans; Eithne Bhraonáin; Erick Sermon; Parrish Smith; Chauncey Hawkins; Michael Jones; Nicky Ryan; Roma Ryan	Metro Boomin; DaHeala; Peter Lee Johnson ^{ad.} Johan Lenox ^{ad.}	Heroes & Villains	December 2, 2022	Remix with Metro Boomin, 21 Savage & Diddy on The Love Album: Off the Grid (Extended) (2023); ChoppedNotSlopped version on Heroes & Villains (Villains Version) (2023)	
"Crew Love" †	Drake; The Weeknd ^{ft.}	Aubrey Graham; Abel Tesfaye; Carlo Montagnese; Noah Shebib; Anthony Palman	Illangelo; The Weeknd; 40	Take Care	November 15, 2011	Live version on Live at SoFi Stadium (2023)	
"Cry for Me" †	The Weeknd	Abel Tesfaye; Ahmad Balshe; Michael Dean; Leland Wayne; Kellee Patterson; Curtis Williams	The Weeknd; Mike Dean; Metro Boomin	Hurry Up Tomorrow	January 31, 2025		
"Curve"	Gucci Mane; The Weeknd ^{ft.}	Radric Davis; Abel Tesfaye; Navraj Goraya; Sugar-Ray Henry	Nav; FrostADX	Mr. Davis	September 13, 2017		
"D.D."	The Weeknd	Michael Jackson	Illangelo	Echoes of Silence and Trilogy	December 21, 2011		
"Dance Until We're Skin and Bones"	The Weeknd; Oneohtrix Point Never	Abel Tesfaye; Daniel Lopatin	The Weeknd; OPN	Hurry Up Tomorrow (Original Motion Picture Score)	July 11, 2025		
"Dancing in the Flames" †	The Weeknd	Abel Tesfaye; Max Martin; Oscar Holter	Max Martin; Oscar Holter; The Weeknd	Hurry Up Tomorrow (After Hours Til Dawn Collection)	September 13, 2024	Live from São Paulo version on Dancing in the Flames (single) (2024); Acoustic version on Dancing in the Flames (single) (2024); Instrumental version on Dancing in the Flames (single) (2024); Acapella version on Dancing in the Flames (single) (2024)	
"Dark Times"	The Weeknd; Ed Sheeran ^{ft.}	Abel Tesfaye; Jason Quenneville; Ed Sheeran	Illangelo	Beauty Behind the Madness	August 28, 2015		
"Dawn FM"	The Weeknd	Abel Tesfaye; Daniel Lopatin	The Weeknd; OPN; Max Martin ^{ad.} Oscar Holter ^{ad.}	Dawn FM	January 7, 2022	OPN Remix on Dawn FM (Alternate World) (2022); Live version on The Dawn FM Experience (2022)	
"Devil May Cry"	The Weeknd	Abel Tesfaye; Jason Quenneville	Rick Rubin	The Hunger Games: Catching Fire – Original Motion Picture Soundtrack	November 15, 2013		
"Die for It" †	Belly; The Weeknd; Nas ^{ft.}	Ahmad Balshe; Abel Tesfaye; Nasir Jones; Sonia Ben Ammar; Sami Hamed; Jason Quenneville; Richard Muñoz; Faris Al-Majed	The ANMLS; DaHeala; Skinny	See You Next Wednesday	August 27, 2021		
"Die for You" †	The Weeknd	Abel Tesfaye; Martin McKinney; Mejdi Rhars; Dylan Wiggins; Magnus Høiberg; William Walsh; Henry Walter	Doc McKinney; Cirkut; The Weeknd; Cashmere Cat ^{co.} Prince 85 ^{co.}	Starboy	November 25, 2016	Remix with Ariana Grande on Starboy (Deluxe Edition) (2023) †; Remix instrumental on Die for You (single) (2023); Remix acapella on Die for You (single) (2023); Sped up version on Die for You (single) (2023); Live version on Live at SoFi Stadium (2023)	
"Dollhouse"	The Weeknd; Lily-Rose Depp	Abel Tesfaye; Michael Dean; Rebecca Fischer	The Weeknd; Mike Dean; Ramsey	The Idol Episode 5 Part 2 (Music from the HBO Original Series)	July 3, 2023		
"Don't Break My Heart"	The Weeknd	Abel Tesfaye; Daniel Lopatin; Max Martin; Oscar Holter; Matt Cohn	The Weeknd; OPN; Max Martin ^{co.} Oscar Holter ^{co.} Matt Cohn ^{co.}	Dawn FM	January 7, 2022		
"Double Fantasy" †	The Weeknd; Future ^{ft.}	Abel Tesfaye; Michael Dean; Leland Wayne; Nayvadius Wilburn	The Weeknd; Mike Dean; Metro Boomin	The Idol Episode 2 (Music from the HBO Original Series)	April 21, 2023	Radio version on Double Fantasy (single) (2023)	
"Drinks On Us" †	Mike Will Made It; The Weeknd ^{ft.} Swae Lee ^{ft.} Future ^{ft.}	Abel Tesfaye; Khalif Brown; Michael Day; Michael Williams; Nayvadius Wilburn; Rafael Pérez-Botija	Mike Will Made It; Michael Day	—N/a	January 31, 2015		
"Drive"	The Weeknd	Abel Tesfaye; Daniel Lopatin; Matt Cohn	The Weeknd; OPN; Matt Cohn; Max Martin ^{co.} Oscar Holter ^{co.} Nathan Salon ^{ad.}	Hurry Up Tomorrow	January 31, 2025		
"Earned It" †	The Weeknd	Abel Tesfaye; Stephan Moccio; Jason Quenneville; Ahmad Balshe	Stephan Moccio; DaHeala	Fifty Shades of Grey (Original Motion Picture Soundtrack) and Beauty Behind the Madness	December 23, 2014	Marian Hill Remix on Fifty Shades of Grey Remixed (2015)	
"Echoes of Silence"	The Weeknd	Abel Tesfaye; Carlo Montagnese	Illangelo	Echoes of Silence and Trilogy	December 21, 2011		
"Elastic Heart" †	Sia; The Weeknd ^{ft.} Diplo ^{ft.}	Sia Furler; Thomas Pentz; Andrew Swanson; Abel Tesfaye	Diplo; Greg Kurstin	The Hunger Games: Catching Fire – Original Motion Picture Soundtrack	October 1, 2013		
"Enjoy the Show"	The Weeknd; Future	Abel Tesfaye; Nayvadius Cash; Michael Dean; Josh Lloyd-Watson; Lydia Kitto	The Weeknd; Mike Dean; Che' Fuego 3000 ^{ad.} Tommy Rush ^{ad.} Just Da 1 ^{ad.} Sage Skolfield ^{ad.}	Hurry Up Tomorrow	January 31, 2025	Single version on Enjoy the Show (single) (2025)	
"Escape from LA"	The Weeknd	Abel Tesfaye; Carlo Montagnese; Leland Wayne; Mike McTaggart	The Weeknd; Metro Boomin; Illangelo	After Hours	March 20, 2020		
"Every Angel Is Terrifying"	The Weeknd	Abel Tesfaye; Daniel Lopatin; Matt Cohn	The Weeknd; OPN; Matt Cohn ^{ad.}	Dawn FM	January 7, 2022		
"Exodus"	M.I.A. The Weeknd ^{ft.}	Maya Arulpragasam; Dave Taylor; Abel Tesfaye; Carlo Montagnese; Martin McKinney	Switch	Matangi	November 1, 2013		
"Faith"	The Weeknd	Abel Tesfaye; Ahmad Balshe; Carlo Montagnese; Leland Wayne	The Weeknd; Metro Boomin; Illangelo	After Hours	March 20, 2020	Live version on Live at SoFi Stadium (2023)	
"False Alarm" †	The Weeknd	Abel Tesfaye; Martin McKinney; Ahmad Balshe; Benjamin Diehl; Henry Walter; Emmanuel Nickerson	Doc McKinney; The Weeknd; Cirkut ^{co.} Mano ^{co.}	Starboy	September 29, 2016		
"False Idols"	The Weeknd; Lil Baby; Suzanna Son	Abel Tesfaye; Michael Dean; Suzanna Son; Dominique Jones	The Weeknd; Mike Dean	The Idol Episode 5 Part 1 (Music from the HBO Original Series)	June 29, 2023		
"Family"	The Weeknd; Suzanna Son	Abel Tesfaye; Michael Dean; Suzanna Son	The Weeknd; Mike Dean; Sage Skolfield ^{ad.}	The Idol Episode 2 (Music from the HBO Original Series)	June 12, 2023		
"Fill the Void"	The Weeknd; Lily Rose Depp; Ramsey	Abel Tesfaye; Michael Dean; Rebecca Fischer	The Weeknd; Mike Dean; Ramsey	The Idol Episode 4 (Music from the HBO Original Series)	June 23, 2023		
"Final Lullaby"	The Weeknd	Abel Tesfaye; Jason Quenneville	The Weeknd; DaHeala	After Hours (Deluxe Edition)	March 30, 2020		
"Gas Station"	The Weeknd; Oneohtrix Point Never	Abel Tesfaye; Daniel Lopatin	The Weeknd; OPN	Hurry Up Tomorrow (Original Motion Picture Score)	July 11, 2025		
"Gasoline"	The Weeknd	Abel Tesfaye; Daniel Lopatin; Max Martin; Oscar Holter; Matt Cohn	The Weeknd; OPN; Max Martin ^{co.} Oscar Holter ^{co.} Matt Cohn ^{co.}	Dawn FM	January 7, 2022	Live version on The Dawn FM Experience (2022); Live version on Live at SoFi Stadium (2023)	
"Gifted"	French Montana; The Weeknd ^{ft.}	Karim Kharbouch; Abel Tesfaye; Ahmad Balshe; Amir Esmailian; Danny Schofield	DannyBoyStyles	Excuse My French	May 21, 2013		
"Give Me Mercy" (Note: Titled "Africa" in its parent album's first pressing CD edition)	The Weeknd	Abel Tesfaye; Max Martin; Oscar Holter	The Weeknd; Max Martin; Oscar Holter; Ilya ^{ad.}	Hurry Up Tomorrow	January 31, 2025		
"Given Up on Me"	The Weeknd	Abel Tesfaye; Nayvadius Cash; Michael Dean; Daniel Lopatin; Leland Wayne; Dimitri Tiomkin; Ned Washington; James McCants	The Weeknd; Mike Dean; OPN; Metro Boomin; Nathan Salon ^{co.} Sage Skolfield ^{ad.}	Hurry Up Tomorrow	January 31, 2025		
"Gone"	The Weeknd	Abel Tesfaye; Martin McKinney; Carlo Montagnese	Doc McKinney; Illangelo	Thursday and Trilogy	August 18, 2011		
"Hardest to Love"	The Weeknd	Abel Tesfaye; Max Martin; Oscar Holter	The Weeknd; Max Martin; Oscar Holter	After Hours	March 20, 2020		
"Hawái" (Remix) †	Maluma; The Weeknd	Juan Londoño; Édgar Barrera; René Cano; Kevin Cruz; Kevin Jiménez; Johan Espinosa; Stiven Rojas; Bryan Lezcano; Andrés Uribe; Juan Vargas	Ily Wonder; Jowan; Keityn; Kevin ADG; Chan El Genio	—N/a	November 5, 2020		
"Heartbeat Slower"	The Weeknd; Oneohtrix Point Never	Abel Tesfaye; Daniel Lopatin	The Weeknd; OPN	Hurry Up Tomorrow (Original Motion Picture Score)	July 11, 2025		
"Heartless" †	The Weeknd	Abel Tesfaye; Leland Wayne; Carlo Montagnese; Andre Proctor	The Weeknd; Metro Boomin; Illangelo; Dre Moon ^{co.}	After Hours	November 27, 2019	Remix featuring Lil Uzi Vert on After Hours (Remixes) (2020); Vapor Wave Remix featuring Lil Uzi Vert on After Hours (Remixes) (2020); Live version on Live at SoFi Stadium (2023)	
"Heaven or Las Vegas"	The Weeknd	Abel Tesfaye; Martin McKinney; Carlo Montagnese	Doc McKinney; Illangelo	Thursday and Trilogy	August 18, 2011		
"Here We Go... Again"	The Weeknd; Tyler, the Creator ^{ft.}	Abel Tesfaye; Tyler Okonma; Masamune Kudo; Bruce Johnston; Christian Love; Brian Kennedy; Benny Bock; Charlie Coffeen	The Weeknd; Rex Kudo; Bruce Johnston; Brian Kennedy; Benny Bock; Charlie Coffeen	Dawn FM	January 7, 2022		
"High for This"	The Weeknd	Abel Tesfaye; Adrien Gough; Henry Walter	The Dream Machine	House of Balloons and Trilogy	March 21, 2011		
"Hong Kong" †	The Weeknd; Faye Wong ^{ft.}	Abel Tesfaye; Yang Lide; Salsa Chen; Calvin Poon	The Weeknd; Sage Skolfield; Oscar Holter	—N/a	October 31, 2026		
"House of Balloons / Glass Table Girls"	The Weeknd	Abel Tesfaye; Martin McKinney; Carlo Montagnese; Susan Ballion; Peter Clarke; John McGeoch; Steven Severin	Doc McKinney; Illangelo	House of Balloons and Trilogy	March 21, 2011		
"How Do I Make You Love Me?"	The Weeknd	Abel Tesfaye; Daniel Lopatin; Max Martin; Axel Hedfors; Steve Angello; Sebastian Ingrosso; Oscar Holter; Matt Cohn	The Weeknd; OPN; Max Martin ^{co.} Swedish House Mafia ^{co.} Oscar Holter ^{co.} Matt Cohn ^{co.}	Dawn FM	January 7, 2022	Sebastian Ingrosso & Salvatore Ganacci Remix on Dawn FM (Alternate World) (2022); Live version on The Dawn FM Experience (2022); Live version on Live at SoFi Stadium (2023)	
"Hurricane" †	Kanye West; The Weeknd; Lil Baby ^{ft.}	Kanye West; Abel Tesfaye; Dominique Jones; Michael Dean; Jahmal Gwin; Khalil Abdul-Rahman; Ronald Spence; Henry Walter; Mark Williams; Raul Cubina; Charles Njapa; Christopher Ruelas; Mark Mbogo; Nasir Pemberton; Sam Barsh; Josh Mease; Cydel Young; Malik Yusef; Orlando Wilder; Albert Daniels; Cailin Russo; Daniel Seeff; Dexter Mills; Tobias Smith	Kanye West; Mike Dean; BoogzDaBeast; DJ Khalil; Ronny J Cirkut ^{co.} Ojivolta ^{co.} 88-Keys ^{ad.} Nascent ^{ad.}	Donda	August 29, 2021	Live version on Live at SoFi Stadium (2023)	
"Hurry Up Tomorrow"	The Weeknd	Abel Tesfaye	Mike Dean; OPN; DaHeala; Nathan Salon ^{co.} Sage Skolfield ^{ad.}	Hurry Up Tomorrow	January 31, 2025		
"Hurt You"	The Weeknd; Gesaffelstein	Abel Tesfaye; Mike Lévy; Guy-Manuel de Homem-Christo; Henry Walter	Gesaffelstein; Guy-Manuel de Homem-Christo; Cirkut	My Dear Melancoly	March 30, 2018		
"I Can't Fucking Sing"	The Weeknd	Abel Tesfaye; Daniel Lopatin; Nathan Salon	The Weeknd; OPN; Nathan Salon	Hurry Up Tomorrow	January 31, 2025		
"I Can't Wait to Get There"	The Weeknd	Abel Tesfaye; Michael Dean; Thomas Brown; Thomas Lumpkins; Peter Lee Johnson	The Weeknd; Mike Dean; Tommy Brown; Tommy Parker; Peter Lee Johnson; Sage Skolfield ^{ad.}	Hurry Up Tomorrow	January 31, 2025		
"I Feel It Coming" †	The Weeknd; Daft Punk ^{ft.}	Abel Tesfaye; Thomas Bangalter; Guy-Manuel de Homem-Christo; Martin McKinney; Henry Walter; Eric Chedeville	Daft Punk; Doc McKinney ^{co.} Cirkut ^{co.} The Weeknd ^{co.}	Starboy	November 24, 2016	Live version on Live at SoFi Stadium (2023)	
"I Feel Like I Know You"	The Weeknd; Oneohtrix Point Never	Abel Tesfaye; Daniel Lopatin	The Weeknd; OPN	Hurry Up Tomorrow (Original Motion Picture Score)	July 11, 2025		
"I Heard You're Married"	The Weeknd; Lil Wayne ^{ft.}	Abel Tesfaye; Dwayne Carter; Adam Wiles; Daniel Lopatin	The Weeknd; Calvin Harris; OPN ^{ad.} Max Martin ^{ad.} Oscar Holter ^{ad.}	Dawn FM	January 7, 2022		
"I Was Never There"	The Weeknd; Gesaffelstein	Abel Tesfaye; Mike Lévy; Adam Feeney	Gesaffelstein; Frank Dukes	My Dear Melancoly	March 30, 2018	Live version on Live at SoFi Stadium (2023)	
"I'm good"	Lil Wayne; The Weeknd ^{ft.}	DJ Drama; Abel Tesfaye; Dwayne Carter	DJ Drama	Dedication 5	September 1, 2013		
"In Heaven" (Live)	The Weeknd	Peter Ivers; David Lynch	Mike Dean	After Hours (After Hours Til Dawn Collection)	September 11, 2026		
"In the Night" †	The Weeknd	Abel Tesfaye; Ahmad Balshe; Ali Payami; Savan Kotecha; Peter Svensson; Max Martin	Max Martin; Ali Payami; The Weeknd ^{co.}	Beauty Behind the Madness	August 28, 2015		
"In Too Deep"	The Weeknd; Oneohtrix Point Never	Abel Tesfaye; Daniel Lopatin	The Weeknd; OPN	Hurry Up Tomorrow (Original Motion Picture Score)	July 11, 2025		
"In Vein"	Rick Ross; The Weeknd ^{ft.}	William Roberts; Jason Quenneville; Abel Tesfaye	The Weeknd; DaHeala; Puff Daddy ^{ad.}	Mastermind	March 3, 2014		
"In Your Eyes" †	The Weeknd	Abel Tesfaye; Ahmad Balshe; Max Martin; Oscar Holter	The Weeknd; Max Martin; Oscar Holter	After Hours	March 20, 2020	Remix with Doja Cat on After Hours (Japanese Edition) (2020); Kenny G Remix (2020)	
"Initiation"	The Weeknd	Abel Tesfaye; Martin Wong; Carlo Montagnese; Georgia Muldrow	DropxLife; Illangelo	Echoes of Silence and Trilogy	December 21, 2011		
"Intro" (Live)	The Weeknd	Abel Tesfaye; Michael Dean	The Weeknd; Mike Dean	Live at SoFi Stadium	March 3, 2023		
"Is There Someone Else?"	The Weeknd	Abel Tesfaye; Daniel Lopatin; Max Martin; Thomas Brown; Peter Johnson	The Weeknd; OPN; Tommy Brown; Peter Lee Johnson; Max Martin ^{ad.} Oscar Holter ^{ad.}	Dawn FM	January 7, 2022	Live version on The Dawn FM Experience (2022); Live version on Live at SoFi Stadium (2023)	
"It's Mostly Psychological"	The Weeknd; Oneohtrix Point Never	Abel Tesfaye; Daniel Lopatin	The Weeknd; OPN	Hurry Up Tomorrow (Original Motion Picture Score)	July 11, 2025		
"Jealous Guy"	The Weeknd	John Lennon	The Weeknd; Mike Dean	The Idol Episode 4 (Music from the HBO Original Series)	June 23, 2023		
"King of the Fall"	The Weeknd	Abel Tesfaye; Jason Quenneville	DaHeala; Mike Dean; Brandon Hollemoon; The Weeknd	—N/a	July 20, 2014		
"Kiss Land" †	The Weeknd	Abel Tesfaye; Danny Schofield; Jack Holkeboer; Jason Quenneville; Sébastien Tellier	Silkky Johnson; The Weeknd; DaHeala	Kiss Land	May 17, 2013	Live version on Live at SoFi Stadium (2023)	
"K-pop" †	Travis Scott; Bad Bunny; The Weeknd	Jacques Webster; Benito Ocasio; Abel Tesfaye; Carlo Montagnese; Benjamin Saint-Fort; Matthew Samuels; Jahaan Sweet; Bigram Zayas	Illangelo; Bnyx; Boi-1da; Jahaan Sweet; DVLP ^{co.}	Utopia	July 21, 2023	Chopped & Screwed version on K-Pop (Chopped & Screwed) (2023); Instrumental version on K-Pop (Chopped & Screwed) (2023); Sped up version on K-Pop (Chopped & Screwed) (2023)	
"La Fama" †	Rosalía; The Weeknd ^{ft.}	Rosalia Tobella; Abel Tesfaye; Noah Goldstein; Adam Feeney; Alejandro Ramírez; Marco Masís; Pablo Díaz-Reixa; Dylan Wiggins; David Rodríguez	Noah Goldstein; Sky Rompiendo; El Guincho; Tainy; Rosalía; Frank Dukes; Jean Rodriguez; Dylan Patrice; Roland Gajate Garcia ^{ad.}	Motomami	November 11, 2021		
"Less than Zero" †	The Weeknd	Abel Tesfaye; Max Martin; Oscar Holter	The Weeknd; Max Martin; Oscar Holter; OPN ^{ad.}	Dawn FM	January 7, 2022	Live version on The Dawn FM Experience (2022); Live version on Live at SoFi Stadium (2023)	
"Life of the Party"	The Weeknd	Abel Tesfaye; Martin McKinney; Carlo Montagnese; Anthony Grier; Björn Berglund; Pontus Berghe; Vini Reilly	Doc McKinney; Illangelo	Thursday and Trilogy	August 18, 2011		
"Like A God"	The Weeknd	Abel Tesfaye; Michael Dean; Suzanna Son	The Weeknd; Mike Dean; Sage Skolfield ^{ad.}	The Idol Episode 5 Part 1 (Music from the HBO Original Series)	June 29, 2023		
"Live For" †	The Weeknd; Drake ^{ft.}	Abel Tesfaye; Aubrey Graham; Ahmad Balshe; Danny Schofield; Jason Quenneville	DannyBoyStyles; The Weeknd; DaHeala	Kiss Land	August 20, 2013		
"Loft Music"	The Weeknd	Abel Tesfaye; Jeremy Rose; Victoria Legrand; Alex Scally	Jeremy Rose; The Weeknd	House of Balloons and Trilogy	March 21, 2011		
"Lonely Star"	The Weeknd	Abel Tesfaye; Martin McKinney; Carlo Montagnese	Doc McKinney; Illangelo	Thursday and Trilogy	August 18, 2011		
"Losers"	The Weeknd; Labrinth ^{ft.}	Abel Tesfaye; Timothy McKenzie; Carlo Montagnese	Labrinth; Illangelo; The Weeknd	Beauty Behind the Madness	August 28, 2015		
"Lost in the Fire" †	Gesaffelstein; The Weeknd	Mike Lévy; Abel Tesfaye; Jason Quenneville; Ahmad Balshe; Nate Donmoyer	Gesaffelstein; DaHeala; The Weeknd; Nate Donmoyer	Hyperion	January 11, 2019		
"Love in the Sky" †	The Weeknd	Abel Tesfaye; Ahmad Balshe; Richard Muñoz; Danny Schofield; Jason Quenneville	DannyBoyStyles; The Weeknd; DaHeala	Kiss Land	July 30, 2013		
"Love Me Harder" †	Ariana Grande; The Weeknd	Max Martin; Savan Kotecha; Peter Svensson; Ali Payami; Abel Tesfaye; Ahmad Balshe	Ali Payami; Peter Svensson; Peter Carlsson	My Everything	August 22, 2014	Alex Ghenea Remix on My Everything (French and Italian Edition) (2014); DJ Class Remix on The Remix (2015); Gregor Salto Amsterdam Mix on The Remix (2015); Kassiano Remix on The Remix (2015); A Cappella version (2024) on Love Me Harder (single) (2014); Instrumental version (2024) on Love Me Harder (single) (2014)	
"Love to Lay"	The Weeknd	Abel Tesfaye; Max Martin; Peter Svensson; Savan Kotecha; Ali Payami; Ahmad Balshe	Max Martin; Ali Payami; The Weeknd	Starboy	November 25, 2016		
"Low Life" †	Future; The Weeknd ^{ft.}	Nayvadius Wilburn; Abel Tesfaye; Benjamin Diehl; Jason Quenneville; Leland Wayne	Metro Boomin; Ben Billions; DaHeala; The Weeknd	Evol	February 6, 2016	Live version on Live at SoFi Stadium (2023)	
"Lust for Life" †	Lana Del Rey; The Weeknd ^{ft.}	Lana Del Rey; Rick Nowels; Abel Tesfaye; Max Martin	Lana Del Rey; Rick Nowels; Kieron Menzies; Dean Reid; Max Martin ^{ad.}	Lust for Life	April 19, 2017	BloodPop Remix (2017); The Avener Rework (2017)	
"Might Not" †	Belly; The Weeknd ^{ft.}	Ahmad Balshe; Benjamin Diehl; Abel Tesfaye	Ben Billions	Up for Days	May 7, 2015		
"Missed You"	The Weeknd	Abel Tesfaye; Jason Quenneville	The Weeknd; DaHeala	After Hours (Deluxe Edition)	March 30, 2020		
"Montreal"	The Weeknd	Abel Tesfaye; Carlo Montagnese; France Gall	Illangelo	Echoes of Silence and Trilogy	December 21, 2011		
"Moth to a Flame" †	Swedish House Mafia; The Weeknd	Axel Hedfors; Steve Angello; Sebastian Ingrosso; Carl Nordström; Abel Tesfaye	Swedish House Mafia; Desembra	Paradise Again and Dawn FM (Alternate World)	October 22, 2021	Extended mix on Moth to a Flame (single) (2022); Adriatique Remix (2022); Chris Lake Remix on Moth to a Flame (single) (2022); Moojo Remix (2022); Tourist Remix on Moth to a Flame (single) (2022)	
"Muted"	The Weeknd; Oneohtrix Point Never	Abel Tesfaye; Daniel Lopatin	The Weeknd; OPN	Hurry Up Tomorrow (Original Motion Picture Score)	July 11, 2025		
"My Only Vice"	Justice; The Weeknd ^{ft.}	Gaspard Augé; Xavier de Rosnay; Abel Tesfaye	Justice	Grand Theft Auto VI: Original Score	December 11, 2026		
"Niagara Falls"	The Weeknd	Abel Tesfaye; Michael Dean; Kenneth Edmonds	The Weeknd; Mike Dean; Sage Skolfield ^{ad.}	Hurry Up Tomorrow	January 31, 2025		
"Next"	The Weeknd	Abel Tesfaye; Carlo Montagnese; Martin Wong	Illangelo	Echoes of Silence and Trilogy	December 21, 2011		
"Nocturnal" †	Disclosure; The Weeknd ^{ft.}	Guy Lawrence; Howard Lawrence; James Napier; Abel Tesfaye	Disclosure	Caracal	September 25, 2015	Disclosure V.I.P. Remix on Disclosure VIPs (2021); Disclosure V.I.P. Remix / radio edit (2021)	
"Nothing Compares"	The Weeknd	Abel Tesfaye; Ahmad Balshe; Jason Quenneville; Eric Frederic	The Weeknd; DaHeala; Ricky Reed	After Hours (Deluxe Edition)	March 30, 2020		
"Nothing Is Lost (You Give Me Strength)" †	The Weeknd	Abel Tesfaye; Steve Angello; Sebastian Ingrosso; Axel Hedfors; Simon Franglen	Simon Franglen; Swedish House Mafia	Avatar: The Way of Water (Original Motion Picture Soundtrack)	December 15, 2022		
"Nothing Without You"	The Weeknd	Abel Tesfaye; Jason Quenneville; Benjamin Diehl; Thomas Pentz; Ahmad Balshe; Henry Walter	Diplo; Ben Billions; The Weeknd; Cirkut	Starboy	November 25, 2016		
"Odd Look" †	Kavinsky; The Weeknd ^{ft.}	Vincent Belorgey; Sebastian Akchoté	Sebastian	Odd Look EP and Kiss Land (Japanese / Deluxe Edition)	July 24, 2013		
"Off the Table"	Ariana Grande; The Weeknd	Abel Tesfaye; Ariana Grande; Tommy Brown; Steven Franks; Travis Sayles; Shintaro Yasuda	Tommy Brown; Shintaro Yasuda; Mr. Franks ^{co.} Travis Sayles ^{co.}	Positions	October 30, 2020		
"Often" †	The Weeknd	Abel Tesfaye; Benjamin Diehl; Jason Quenneville; Ahmad Balshe; Danny Schofield; Ali Kocatepe; Sabahattin Ali; Osman İşmen	Ben Billions; The Weeknd; DaHeala	Beauty Behind the Madness	July 31, 2014	Remix featuring Rick Ross & Schoolboy Q (2014); Kygo Remix (2015); Live version on Live at SoFi Stadium (2023)	
"One of the Girls" †	The Weeknd; Jennie; Lily Rose Depp	Abel Tesfaye; Michael Dean; Samuel Levinson; Lily-Rose Depp; Rebecca Fischer	The Weeknd; Mike Dean; Sage Skolfield ^{ad.}	The Idol Episode 4 (Music from the HBO Original Series)	June 23, 2023	Sped Up version on One of the Girls (single) (2023); Slowed version on One of the Girls (single) (2023); Instrumental version on One of the Girls (single) (2023); A Cappella version on One of the Girls (single) (2023)	
"One of Those Nights"	Juicy J The Weeknd ^{ft.}	Jordan Houston; Abel Tesfaye; Danny Schofield; Ahmad Balshe	DannyBoyStyles; The Weeknd	Stay Trippy (Deluxe Edition)	March 11, 2013		
"One Right Now" †	Post Malone; The Weeknd	Austin Post; Abel Tesfaye; Louis Bell; Brian Lee; Andrew Bolooki; Billy Walsh	Louis Bell; Brian Lee; Andrew Bolooki	Twelve Carat Toothache	November 5, 2021		
"Open Hearts"	The Weeknd	Abel Tesfaye; Max Martin; Oscar Holter	Max Martin; Oscar Holter	Hurry Up Tomorrow	January 31, 2025	Single version on Open Hearts (single) (2025)	
"Opening Night"	The Weeknd	Abel Tesfaye; Michael Dean; Daniel Lopatin; Patrick Baker	The Weeknd; Mike Dean; OPN; Nathan Salon ^{co.} Sage Skolfield ^{ad.}	Hurry Up Tomorrow	January 31, 2025		
"Or Nah" (Remix) †	Ty Dolla $ign The Weeknd ^{ft.} Wiz Khalifa ^{ft.} DJ Mustard ^{ft.}	Tyrone Griffin; Cameron Thomaz; Dijon McFarlane; Mike Free; Lemmie Crockem	DJ Mustard; Mike Free	—N/a	June 10, 2014	Live version on Live at SoFi Stadium (2023)	
"Ordinary Life"	The Weeknd	Abel Tesfaye; Max Martin; Peter Svensson; Savan Kotecha; Ali Payami; Ahmad Balshe; Martin McKinney; Henry Walter	Doc McKinney; Cirkut	Starboy	November 25, 2016		
"Out of Time" †	The Weeknd	Abel Tesfaye; Daniel Lopatin; Max Martin; Oscar Holter; Tomoko Aran; Tetsurō Oda	The Weeknd; OPN; Max Martin ^{ad.} Oscar Holter ^{ad.}	Dawn FM	January 7, 2022	Kaytranada Remix on Dawn FM (Alternate World) (2022); Kaytranada Remix radio edit on Out of Time (Remix Bundle) (2022); Instrumental version on Out of Time (Remix Bundle) (2022); Live version on The Dawn FM Experience (2022); Live version on Live at SoFi Stadium (2023); with Tomoko Aran on Dawn FM (After Hours Til Dawn Collection) (2026)	
"Outro" (Live)	The Weeknd	Abel Tesfaye; Michael Dean	The Weeknd; Mike Dean	Live at SoFi Stadium	March 3, 2023		
"Outside"	The Weeknd	Abel Tesfaye; Carlo Montagnese; Ahmad Balshe; Madeline Follin; Ryan Mattos	Illangelo	Echoes of Silence and Trilogy	December 21, 2011		
"Over Now" †	Calvin Harris; The Weeknd	Adam Wiles; Abel Tesfaye; Adam Feeney; Martin McKinney; Jason Quenneville; Dylan Wiggins; William Walsh; Sonjaya Prabhakar; Evren Omer; Shola Phillips	Calvin Harris; The Weeknd; Frank Dukes	—N/a	August 28, 2020		
"Party Monster" †	The Weeknd	Abel Tesfaye; Benjamin Diehl; Martin McKinney; Ahmad Balshe; Lana Del Rey	Ben Billions; Doc McKinney; The Weeknd	Starboy	November 25, 2016	Live version on Live at SoFi Stadium (2023)	
"Phantom Regret by Jim"	The Weeknd	Abel Tesfaye; Jim Carrey; Daniel Lopatin; Max Martin; Oscar Holter; Matt Cohn	The Weeknd; OPN; Max Martin ^{co.} Oscar Holter ^{co.} Matt Cohn ^{co.}	Dawn FM	January 7, 2022	Live version on The Dawn FM Experience (2022)	
"Please Leave a Message"	The Weeknd; Oneohtrix Point Never	Abel Tesfaye; Daniel Lopatin	The Weeknd; OPN	Hurry Up Tomorrow (Original Motion Picture Score)	July 11, 2025		
"Poison" †	Aaliyah; The Weeknd ^{ft.}	Abel Tesfaye; Ahmad Balshe; Stephen Garrett	DannyBoyStyles; Nick Lamb; Mike Dean	Unstoppable	December 17, 2021		
"Popular" †	The Weeknd; Playboi Carti; Madonna	Abel Tesfaye; Jordan Carter; Leland Wayne; Michael Dean; Tommy Rush; Samuel Levinson; Michael Walker; John Flippin	The Weeknd; Metro Boomin; Mike Dean; Tommy Rush	The Idol (After Hours Til Dawn Collection)	June 2, 2023	Sped up version on Popular (single) (2024); Slowed version on Popular (single) (2024); Instrumental version on Popular (single) (2024); A cappella version on Popular (single) (2024)	
"Power Is Power" †	SZA; The Weeknd; Travis Scott	Solána Rowe; Abel Tesfaye; Jacques Webster; Jason Quenneville; Victor Dimotsis; Zach Cooper; Ahmad Balshe; Eric Frederic; Sam Harris; Myles Martin	The Weeknd; Ricky Reed; DaHeala; King Garbage; Myles Martin ^{co.}	For the Throne: Music Inspired by the HBO Series Game of Thrones	April 18, 2019		
"Pray 4 Love"	Travis Scott; The Weeknd ^{ft.}	Jacques Webster; Abel Tesfaye; Adam Feeney; Carlo Montagnese; Michael Dean; Allen Ritter	Travis Scott; The Weeknd; Illangelo; Ben Billions; Mike Dean; Allen Ritter ^{ad.}	Rodeo	September 4, 2015		
"Pray for Me" †	The Weeknd; Kendrick Lamar	Abel Tesfaye; Kendrick Duckworth; Adam Feeney; Anthony Tiffith; Martin McKinney	Frank Dukes; Doc McKinney	Black Panther: The Album	February 2, 2018		
"Pretty" †	The Weeknd	Abel Tesfaye; Ricky Hilfiger; Danny Schofield; Jason Quenneville; Brandon Hollemon	DannyBoyStyles; The Weeknd; DaHeala; Brandon Hollemon	Kiss Land	September 10, 2013		
"Price on My Head" †	Nav; The Weeknd ^{ft.}	Navraj Goraya; Abel Tesfaye; Ahmad Balshe; Derek Bissue; Bradley Geisler	Derek Wise; AlexOnWeed	Bad Habits	March 22, 2019		
"Prisoner"	The Weeknd; Lana Del Rey ^{ft.}	Abel Tesfaye; Lana Del Rey; Carlo Montagnese	Illangelo; The Weeknd ^{co.}	Beauty Behind the Madness	August 28, 2015		
"Privilege"	The Weeknd	Abel Tesfaye; Jason Quenneville; Adam Feeney	Frank Dukes; DaHeala	My Dear Melancoly	March 30, 2018		
"Professional"	The Weeknd	Abel Tesfaye; Ahmad Balshe; Danny Schofield; Jason Quenneville; Rory Quigley; Finian Greenal; Ema Jolly	DannyBoyStyles; The Weeknd; DaHeala; Harry Fraud ^{ad.}	Kiss Land	September 10, 2013		
"Pullin' Up"	Meek Mill; The Weeknd ^{ft.}	Robert Williams; Abel Tesfaye; Benjamin Diehl; Danny Schofield; Carlo Montagnese	Ben Billions; DannyBoyStyles; Illangelo	Dreams Worth More Than Money	June 29, 2015		
"Rambo (Last Blood)"	Bryson Tiller; The Weeknd ^{ft.}	Bryson Tiller; Abel Tesfaye; Joshua Scruggs; Chris Owens; Veniamin Basner	Syk Sense; Chris King	Trapsoul (Deluxe Edition)	September 25, 2015		
"Rather Lie" †	Playboi Carti; The Weeknd	Jordan Carter; Abel Tesfaye	F1lthy; Ojivolta; Twisco; Mike Dean	Music	March 14, 2025		
"Real Life"	The Weeknd	Abel Tesfaye; Jason Quenneville; Stephan Moccio	Stephan Moccio; DaHeala; The Weeknd	Beauty Behind the Madness	August 28, 2015		
"Red Terror"	The Weeknd	Abel Tesfaye; Daniel Lopatin	The Weeknd; OPN; Mike Dean; Cirkut; Nathan Salon ^{ad.} Sage Skolfield ^{ad.}	Hurry Up Tomorrow	January 31, 2025		
"Reflections Laughing"	The Weeknd; Travis Scott; Florence and The Machine	Abel Tesfaye; Jacques Webster; Michael Dean	The Weeknd; Mike Dean; Metro Boomin ^{co.} OPN ^{ad.} Nathan Salon ^{ad.} Sage Skolfield ^{ad.}	Hurry Up Tomorrow	January 31, 2025		
"Remember You" †	Wiz Khalifa; The Weeknd ^{ft.}	Cameron Thomaz; Abel Tesfaye; Carlo Montagnese; Ahmad Balshe; David Patino; Timothy Mosley; Jimmy Douglass; Elgin Lumpkin	Illangelo; Dpat	O.N.I.F.C.	September 24, 2012		
"Reminder" †	The Weeknd	Abel Tesfaye; Emmanuel Nickerson; Martin McKinney; Dylan Wiggins; Henry Walter; Jason Quenneville	Doc McKinney; Mano; Cirkut	Starboy	November 25, 2016	Remix featuring Young Thug & ASAP Rocky (2017) on Starboy (Deluxe Edition) (2023)	
"Repeat After Me" (Interlude)	The Weeknd	Abel Tesfaye; Kevin Parker; Daniel Lopatin	Kevin Parker; OPN	After Hours	March 20, 2020		
"Rockin' " †	The Weeknd	Abel Tesfaye; Max Martin; Peter Svensson; Savan Kotecha; Ali Payami; Ahmad Balshe	Max Martin; Ali Payami; The Weeknd ^{co.}	Starboy	November 25, 2016		
"Rolling Stone"	The Weeknd	Abel Tesfaye; Martin McKinney; Carlo Montagnese	Doc McKinney; Illangelo	Thursday and Trilogy	August 18, 2011		
"Runaway"	The Weeknd	Abel Tesfaye; Max Martin; Oscar Holter; Ilya Salmanzadeh	The Weeknd; Max Martin; Oscar Holter; Ilya	Hurry Up Tomorrow (00XO Edition)	January 31, 2025		
"Sacrifice" †	The Weeknd	Abel Tesfaye; Max Martin; Axel Hedfors; Steve Angello; Sebastian Ingrosso; Carl Nordström; Oscar Holter; Kevin McCord	The Weeknd; Max Martin; Swedish House Mafia; Oscar Holter	Dawn FM	January 7, 2022	Swedish House Mafia Remix on Dawn FM (Alternate World) (2022); Live version on The Dawn FM Experience (2022); Live version on Live at SoFi Stadium (2023)	
"Same Old Song"	The Weeknd; Juicy J ^{ft.}	Abel Tesfaye; Carlo Montagnese	Illangelo	Echoes of Silence and Trilogy	December 21, 2011		
"São Paulo" †	The Weeknd; Anitta	Abel Tesfaye; Larissa Machado; Tatiana Lourenço; Michael Dean; Sean Solymar; Washington Vaz; Agustinho dos Santos; André Viegas; Everton de Araujo; Flavio de Almeida; Marcelo Nei Leal	The Weeknd; Mike Dean; Sean Solymar ^{co.}	Hurry Up Tomorrow	October 30, 2024	Single version on São Paulo (single) (2025); Single / Acapella version on São Paulo (single) (2025); Live from São Paulo version on São Paulo (single) (2025)	
"Save Your Tears" †	The Weeknd	Abel Tesfaye; Ahmad Balshe; Jason Quenneville; Max Martin; Oscar Holter	The Weeknd; Max Martin; Oscar Holter	After Hours	March 20, 2020	OPN Remix on After Hours (Remixes) (2020); Remix with Ariana Grande (2021) on After Hours (Deluxe Edition) (2020) †; Live version on Live at SoFi Stadium (2023)	
"Scared to Live"	The Weeknd	Abel Tesfaye; Ahmad Balshe; Max Martin; Oscar Holter; Daniel Lopatin; Elton John; Bernard Taupin	The Weeknd; Max Martin; Oscar Holter	After Hours	March 20, 2020	SNL Live version on After Hours (Remixes) (2020)	
"Secrets" †	The Weeknd	Abel Tesfaye; Martin McKinney; Henry Walter; Dylan Wiggins; Roland Orzabal; Coz Canler; Jimmy Marinos; Wally Palamarchuk; Mike Skill; Peter Solley	Doc McKinney; The Weeknd; Cirkut	Starboy	November 25, 2016		
"Sexodus" †	M.I.A. The Weeknd ^{ft.}	Maya Arulpragasam; Martin McKinney; Abel Tesfaye; Carlo Montagnese	Hit-Boy; HazeBanga ^{co.}	Matangi	November 1, 2013		
"Shameless"	The Weeknd	Abel Tesfaye; Peter Svensson; Savan Kotecha; Ali Payami; Ahmad Balshe	Max Martin; Ali Payami; Peter Svensson; The Weeknd ^{co.}	Beauty Behind the Madness	August 28, 2015		
"Sidewalks"	The Weeknd; Kendrick Lamar ^{ft.}	Abel Tesfaye; Kendrick Duckworth; Martin McKinney; Daniel Wilson; Robert Richardson; Ali Shaheed Muhammad	Doc McKinney; Bobby Raps; Ali Shaheed Muhammad	Starboy	November 25, 2016		
"Six Feet Under"	The Weeknd	Abel Tesfaye; Nayvadius Wilburn; Martin McKinney; Benjamin Diehl; Leland Wayne; Henry Walter; Ahmad Balshe; Jason Quenneville	Doc McKinney; Cirkut; Metro Boomin; Ben Billions; The Weeknd	Starboy	November 25, 2016		
"Sky Is Falling"	The Weeknd; Oneohtrix Point Never	Abel Tesfaye; Daniel Lopatin	The Weeknd; OPN	Hurry Up Tomorrow (Original Motion Picture Score)	July 11, 2025		
"Smile" †	Juice Wrld; The Weeknd	Jarad Higgins; Abel Tesfaye; Nicholas Mira; Cody Rounds; Danny Snodgrass	Nick Mira; Cxdy; Taz Taylor	Legends Never Die	August 7, 2020		
"Snowchild"	The Weeknd	Abel Tesfaye; Jason Quenneville; Ahmad Balshe; Carlo Montagnese	The Weeknd; Illangelo; DaHeala	After Hours	March 20, 2020		
"Society" (Note: Titled "How It Feels" in its parent album's first pressing CD edition)	The Weeknd	Abel Tesfaye; Max Martin; Oscar Holter	The Weeknd; Max Martin; Oscar Holter	Hurry Up Tomorrow (00XO Edition)	January 31, 2025		
"Some Way" †	Nav; The Weeknd ^{ft.}	Navraj Goraya; Abel Tesfaye	Nav	Nav	February 15, 2017		
"Starboy" †	The Weeknd; Daft Punk ^{ft.}	Abel Tesfaye; Thomas Bangalter; Guy-Manuel de Homem-Christo; Martin McKinney; Henry Walter; Jason Quenneville	Daft Punk; Doc McKinney ^{co.} Cirkut ^{co.} The Weeknd ^{co.}	Starboy	September 21, 2016	Kygo Remix (2016) on Starboy (Deluxe Edition) (2023); Live version on Live at SoFi Stadium (2023)	
"Stargirl Interlude"	The Weeknd; Lana Del Rey ^{ft.}	Abel Tesfaye; Lana Del Rey; Martin McKinney; Timothy McKenzie	Doc McKinney; Labrinth	Starboy	November 25, 2016		
"Starry Eyes"	The Weeknd	Abel Tesfaye; Daniel Lopatin; Thomas Brown; Peter Johnson	The Weeknd; OPN; Max Martin ^{ad.} Oscar Holter ^{ad.}	Dawn FM	January 7, 2022	Mike Dean Remix on Dawn FM (Alternate World) (2022); Live version on The Dawn FM Experience (2022)	
"Take Me Back"	The Weeknd	Abel Tesfaye; Michael Dean; Jason Quenneville	The Weeknd; Mike Dean; Metro Boomin ^{ad.}	The Idol Episode 3 (Music from the HBO Original Series)	June 19, 2023		
"Take Me Back to LA"	The Weeknd	Abel Tesfaye; Michael Dean; Jason Quenneville	The Weeknd; Mike Dean; DaHeala; Sean Solymar ^{ad.} Tommy Rush ^{ad.} Sage Skolfield ^{ad.}	Hurry Up Tomorrow	January 31, 2025		
"Take My Breath" †	The Weeknd	Abel Tesfaye; Ahmad Balshe; Andrea Di Ceglie; Luigi Tutolo; Max Martin; Oscar Holter	The Weeknd; Max Martin; Oscar Holter	Dawn FM	August 6, 2021	Single version (2021) on Dawn FM (Alternate World) (2022); Extended version on Take My Breath (single) (2021); Instrumental version on Take My Breath (single) (2021); Remix featuring Agents of Time on Dawn FM (Alternate World) (2022); Live version on The Dawn FM Experience (2022); Live version on Live at SoFi Stadium (2023)	
"Tears in the Club" †	FKA Twigs; The Weeknd ^{ft.}	Tahliah Barnett; Abel Tesfaye; Ali Tamposi; Henry Walter; Alejandra Ghersi; Pablo Díaz-Reixa	FKA Twigs; Cirkut; Arca; El Guincho	Caprisongs	December 16, 2021		
"Tears in the Rain"	The Weeknd	Abel Tesfaye; Ahmad Balshe; Danny Schofield; Jason Quenneville	DannyBoyStyles; The Weeknd; DaHeala	Kiss Land	September 10, 2013		
"Tell Your Friends"	The Weeknd	Abel Tesfaye; Kanye West; Christopher Pope; Carlo Montagnese; Carl Marshall; Robert Holmes	Che Pope; Kanye West; The Weeknd; Illangelo ^{co.} Mike Dean ^{co.} Noah Goldstein ^{ad.} Omar Riad ^{ad.}	Beauty Behind the Madness	August 28, 2015		
"The Abyss"	The Weeknd; Lana Del Rey	Abel Tesfaye; Elizabeth Grant; Michael Dean; Patrick Greenaway	The Weeknd; Mike Dean; Patrick Greenaway ^{co.} OPN ^{ad.} Sage Skolfield ^{ad.}	Hurry Up Tomorrow	January 31, 2025		
"The Birds, Pt. 1"	The Weeknd	Abel Tesfaye; Martin McKinney; Carlo Montagnese	Doc McKinney; Illangelo	Thursday and Trilogy	August 18, 2011		
"The Birds, Pt. 2"	The Weeknd	Abel Tesfaye; Martin McKinney; Carlo Montagnese; Martina Topley-Bird; Alex McGowen; Nicholas Bird; Steve Crittall	Doc McKinney; Illangelo	Thursday and Trilogy	August 18, 2011		
"The Fall"	The Weeknd	Abel Tesfaye; Michael Volpe; Carlo Montagnese	Clams Casino; Illangelo	Echoes of Silence and Trilogy	December 21, 2011		
"The Hills" †	The Weeknd	Abel Tesfaye; Ahmad Balshe; Emmanuel Nickerson; Carlo Montagnese; Tom Raybould	Mano; Illangelo	Beauty Behind the Madness	May 27, 2015	Remix featuring Eminem on Beauty Behind the Madness (Japanese Edition) (2015); Remix featuring Nicki Minaj on Beauty Behind the Madness (Japanese Edition) (2015); Daniel Ennis Remix (2015); RL Grime Remix (2015); Live version on Live at SoFi Stadium (2023)	
"The Knowing"	The Weeknd	Abel Tesfaye; Martin McKinney; Carlo Montagnese; Elizabeth Fraser; Robin Guthrie; Simon Raymonde	Doc McKinney; Illangelo	House of Balloons and Trilogy	March 21, 2011		
"The Lure (Main Theme)"	The Weeknd; Mike Dean	Abel Tesfaye; Michael Dean	The Weeknd; Mike Dean	The Idol Episode 1 (Music from the HBO Original Series)	June 9, 2023		
"The Morning"	The Weeknd	Abel Tesfaye; Martin McKinney; Carlo Montagnese	Doc McKinney; Illangelo	House of Balloons and Trilogy	March 21, 2011	Live version on Live at SoFi Stadium (2023)	
"The Party & The After Party"	The Weeknd	Abel Tesfaye; Jeremy Rose; Rainer Blanchaer; Victoria Legrand; Alex Scally	Jeremy Rose; The Weeknd; Rainer Millar Blanchaer	House of Balloons and Trilogy	March 21, 2011		
"The Town"	The Weeknd	Abel Tesfaye; Ahmad Balshe; Danny Schofield; Jason Quenneville	DannyBoyStyles; The Weeknd; DaHeala	Kiss Land	September 10, 2013		
"The Zone" †	The Weeknd; Drake ^{ft.}	Aubrey Graham; Abel Tesfaye; Martin McKinney; Carlo Montagnese	Doc McKinney; Illangelo	Thursday and Trilogy	August 18, 2011		
"Thought I Knew You"	Nicki Minaj; The Weeknd ^{ft.}	Onika Maraj; Abel Tesfaye; Brittany Hazzard; Jeremy Reid	Jeremy Reid	Queen	August 10, 2018		
"Thursday"	The Weeknd	Abel Tesfaye; Martin McKinney; Carlo Montagnese	Doc McKinney; Illangelo	Thursday and Trilogy	August 18, 2011		
"Till Dawn (Here Comes the Sun)"	The Weeknd	Abel Tesfaye; Martin McKinney; Carlo Montagnese	Doc McKinney; Illangelo	Echoes of Silence (bonus track) and Trilogy	November 13, 2012		
"Timeless" †	The Weeknd; Playboi Carti	Abel Tesfaye; Jordan Carter; Pharrell Williams; Michael Dean; Mark Williams; Raul Cubina; Jarrod Morgan; Kobe Hood; Tariq Sharrieff; Devon Chisolm	Pharrell Williams; Mike Dean ^{co.} Ojivolta ^{co.} Twisco ^{co.}	Hurry Up Tomorrow	September 27, 2024	Remix with Playboi Carti featuring Doechii on Timeless (Remix) (2025) †; Instrumental version on Timeless (Remix) (2025)	
"Tomorrow's Coming"	The Weeknd; Oneohtrix Point Never	Abel Tesfaye; Daniel Lopatin	The Weeknd; OPN	Hurry Up Tomorrow (Original Motion Picture Score)	July 11, 2025		
"Too Late"	The Weeknd	Abel Tesfaye; Jason Quenneville; Carlo Montagnese; Eric Frederic	The Weeknd; Illangelo; Ricky Reed; DaHeala; Nate Mercereau ^{ad.}	After Hours	March 20, 2020		
"True Colors"	The Weeknd	Abel Tesfaye; William Walsh; Magnus Høiberg; Benjamin Levin; Brittany Hazzard; Samuel Wishkoski; Jacob Dutton	Benny Blanco; Cashmere Cat; The Weeknd; Jake One; Swish	Starboy	November 25, 2016		
"Try Me"	The Weeknd	Abel Tesfaye; Ahmad Balshe; Jason Quenneville; Adam Feeney; Michael Williams; Marquel Middlebrooks	Mike Will Made It; Marz; Frank Dukes; DaHeala	My Dear Melancoly	March 30, 2018		
"Twenty Eight" †	The Weeknd	Abel Tesfaye; Martin McKinney; Carlo Montagnese	Doc McKinney; Illangelo	House of Balloons (bonus track) and Trilogy	November 13, 2012		
"UnFazed"	Lil Uzi Vert; The Weeknd ^{ft.}	Symere Woods; Abel Tesfaye; Jason Quenneville; Donald Cannon; Jamaal Henry	DaHeala; The Weeknd; Don Cannon; Maaly Raw	Luv Is Rage 2	August 25, 2017		
"Until I Bleed Out"	The Weeknd	Abel Tesfaye; Leland Wayne; Daniel Lopatin; Mejdi Rhars; Notinbed	The Weeknd; Metro Boomin; OPN; Prince 85; Notinbed	After Hours	March 20, 2020		
"Until We're Skin & Bones"	The Weeknd	Abel Tesfaye; Daniel Lopatin; Nathan Salon	The Weeknd; OPN; Mike Dean; Nathan Salon	Hurry Up Tomorrow	January 31, 2025		
"Valerie"	The Weeknd	Abel Tesfaye; Martin McKinney; Carlo Montagnese	Doc McKinney; Illangelo	Thursday (bonus track) and Trilogy	November 13, 2012		
"Wake Me Up"	The Weeknd; Justice	Abel Tesfaye; Gaspard Augé; Xavier de Rosnay; Ahmad Balshe; Vincent Taurelle; Michael Dean; John Padgett; Rod Temperton	The Weeknd; Justice; Mike Dean; Johnny Jewel; Sage Skolfield ^{ad.}	Hurry Up Tomorrow	January 31, 2025	Single version on Wake Me Up (single) (2025)	
"Wanderlust" †	The Weeknd	Abel Tesfaye; Ahmad Balshe; Joseph Bostani; Richard Muñoz; Danny Schofield; Jason Quenneville; Selfia Musmin; Albert Tamaela	DannyBoyStyles; The Weeknd; DaHeala	Kiss Land	September 10, 2013	Pharrell Remix on Kiss Land (Deluxe Edition) (2013); Clean Bandit Remix on Wanderlust (Remixes) (2014); Steve Pitron & Max Sanna Club Mix on Wanderlust (Remixes) (2014); Steve Pitron & Max Sanna Radio Edit on Wanderlust (Remixes) (2014)	
"Wasted Times"	The Weeknd	Abel Tesfaye; Brittany Hazzard; Sonny Moore; Adam Feeney	Frank Dukes; Skrillex ^{co.}	My Dear Melancoly	March 30, 2018		
"We Still Don't Trust You" †	Future; Metro Boomin; The Weeknd	Nayvadius Wilburn; Leland Wayne; Abel Tesfaye; Michael Dean	Metro Boomin; Mike Dean	We Still Don't Trust You	April 12, 2024		
"We'll Take It Backstage"	The Weeknd; Oneohtrix Point Never	Abel Tesfaye; Daniel Lopatin	The Weeknd; OPN	Hurry Up Tomorrow (Original Motion Picture Score)	July 11, 2025		
"What You Need"	The Weeknd	Abel Tesfaye; Jeremy Rose	Jeremy Rose; The Weeknd	House of Balloons and Trilogy	March 21, 2011		
"What You Want" †	Belly; The Weeknd ^{ft.}	Ahmad Balshe; Abel Tesfaye; Richard Muñoz; Faris Al-Majed; Navraj Goraya; Henry Walter	The ANMLS; Nav; Cirkut ^{co.}	Immigrant	May 24, 2018		
"Where You Belong"	The Weeknd	Abel Tesfaye; Michael Dean; Ahmad Balshe	Mike Dean	Fifty Shades of Grey (Original Motion Picture Soundtrack)	December 23, 2014	SOHN Remix on Fifty Shades of Grey: Remixed (2015)	
"Wicked Games" †	The Weeknd	Abel Tesfaye; Martin McKinney; Carlo Montagnese; Rainer Blanchaer	Doc McKinney; Illangelo	House of Balloons and Trilogy	March 21, 2011	Live version on Live at SoFi Stadium (2023)	
"Wild Love" †	Cashmere Cat; The Weeknd ^{ft.} Francis and the Lights ^{ft.}	Abel Tesfaye; Benjamin Levin; Magnus Høiberg; Francis Starlite	Cashmere Cat; Benny Blanco	9	August 26, 2016		
"Without a Warning" (Note: Titled "The Crowd" in its parent album's first pressing CD edition)	The Weeknd	Abel Tesfaye; Thabo Publicover; Tewodros Fantu; Daniel Lopatin; Oscar Holter; Darryl Howard; Isaac Brown	The Weeknd; Thabo; Teddy Fantum; OPN ^{co.} Oscar Holter ^{co.} Mike Dean ^{co.} Sage Skolfield ^{ad.}	Hurry Up Tomorrow	January 31, 2025		
"Wonderful" †	Travis Scott; The Weeknd ^{ft.}	Jacques Webster; Abel Tesfaye; Matthew Samuels; Michael Dean; Tyler Williams	Travis Scott; Boi-1da; T-Minus; Mike Dean	Birds in the Trap Sing McKnight	February 16, 2016		
"XO / The Host"	The Weeknd	Abel Tesfaye; Carlo Montagnese	Illangelo	Echoes of Silence and Trilogy	December 21, 2011		
"You Right" †	Doja Cat; The Weeknd	Amala Dlamini; Abel Tesfaye; Lukasz Gottwald	Dr. Luke	Planet Her	June 25, 2021	Extended version on Planet Her (Deluxe Edition) (2021)	
"Young Metro" †	Future; Metro Boomin; The Weeknd	Nayvadius Wilburn; Leland Wayne; Abel Tesfaye	Metro Boomin; Mike Dean; David x Eli	We Don't Trust You	March 22, 2024		

=== Non-artist credits ===
As of September 20, 2025, The Weeknd was part of 24 commercially released songs, where he was not credited as artist but is credited in other ways. This encompasses (background) vocals, writing, producing or remixing credits. Credits for songs where other artists have sampled The Weeknd's originals are not listed.

List of commercially released songs, crediting The Weeknd as performer
Song	Original					Credits	Ref(s)
Song	Artist(s)	Songwriter(s)	Producer(s)	Album(s)	First release	Credits	Ref(s)
"Artificial Intelligence"	Mike Dean	Abel Tesfaye; Michael Dean	Mike Dean; The Weeknd; Sam Levinson	4:23	April 29, 2023	writer producer	
"Cameras / Good Ones Go Interlude"	Drake	Aubrey Graham; Noah Shebib; Anthony Palman; Abel Tesfaye; Jason Beck	40; Drake ^{co.}	Take Care	November 15, 2011	writer backing vocals	
"Defame Moi"	Mike Dean	Abel Tesfaye; Michael Dean	Mike Dean; The Weeknd	4:23	April 29, 2023	writer producer	
"Distorted Time"	Mike Dean	Abel Tesfaye; Michael Dean	Mike Dean; Abel Tesfaye	424	April 26, 2024	writer producer	
"Emotionless"	Mike Dean	Abel Tesfaye; Michael Dean	Mike Dean; The Weeknd	4:23	April 29, 2023	writer producer	
"Eyes Closed"	Halsey	Ashley Frangipane; Abel Tesfaye; Benjamin Levin; Nathan Perez; Magnus Høiberg	Benny Blanco; Happy Perez; Magnus August Høiberg	Hopeless Fountain Kingdom	May 4, 2017	writer	
"FML"	Kanye West	Kanye West; Abel Tesfaye; Cydel Young; Michael Dean; Andrew Dawson; Noah Goldstein; Leland Wayne; Ernest Brown; Christian Boggs; Darius Jenkins; K. Rachel Mills; Marcus Byrd; Ross Birchard; Jacques Webster; Lawrence Cassidy; Vincent Cassidy; Paul Wiggin	Kanye West; Mitus; Metro Boomin ^{co.} Noah Goldstein ^{co.} Mike Dean ^{co.} Hudson Mohawke ^{ad.} Andrew Dawson ^{ad.}	The Life of Pablo	February 14, 2016	writer vocals	
"Marry the Night" (Remix)	Lady Gaga	Stefani Germanotta; Fernando Garibay	Lady Gaga; Fernando Garibay; The Weeknd; Illangelo	Born This Way: The Remix	November 18, 2011	remixer	
"More Coke!!"	Mike Dean	Abel Tesfaye; Michael Dean	Mike Dean; The Weeknd	4:23	April 29, 2023	writer producer	
"My Sweet Lord"	Troye Sivan	George Harrison	The Weeknd; Mike Dean; Bram Inscore ^{ad.}	The Idol Episode 5 Part 2 (Music from the HBO Original Series)	July 3, 2023	producer	
"No Nightmares"	Oneohtrix Point Never	Abel Tesfaye; Daniel Lopatin	Daniel Lopatin; The Weeknd	Magic Oneohtrix Point Never	October 30, 2020	writer producer vocals	
"Once Upon a Time"	Mike Dean	Abel Tesfaye; Jeremy Hartney; Louise Donegan; Michael Dean; Thomas Mikailin	Mike Dean; The Weeknd; Tommy Rush	4:23	April 29, 2023	writer producer	
"Practice"	Drake	Aubrey Graham; Noah Shebib; Abel Tesfaye; Adrian Eccleston	Noah Shebib; Drake ^{co.}	Take Care	November 15, 2011	writer	
"Requiem"	Belly; Nav ^{ft.}	Ahmad Balshe; Navraj Goraya; Abel Tesfaye; Andrew Franklin	Nav; DaHeala ^{ad.}	See You Next Wednesday	August 27, 2021	writer backing vocals	
"Shake It Out" (Remix)	Florence + the Machine	Florence Welch; Paul Epworth	Paul Epworth; The Weeknd	Shake It Out (Single)	September 14, 2011	remixer	
"Shot for Me"	Drake	Aubrey Graham; Noah Shebib; Abel Tesfaye; N. Kobe; Rainer Blanchaer	40	Take Care	November 15, 2011	writer	
"Skeletons"	Travis Scott	Jacques Webster; Pharrell Williams; Kevin Parker; Abel Tesfaye; Kanye West; Reine Fiske; Michael Dean	Tame Impala; Travis Scott ^{ad.}	Astroworld	August 3, 2018	writer vocals	
"The Ride"	Drake	Aubrey Graham; Abel Tesfaye; Anthony Palman; Martin McKinney	Doc McKinney; The Weeknd	Take Care	November 15, 2011	writer producer	
"The Weeknd's Dark Secret"	American Dad! Cast	Abel Tesfaye; Asa Taccone; Joel Hurwitz	Asa Taccone; Joel Hurwitz; The Weeknd	American Dad! Greatest Hits	October 25, 2024	writer producer	
"Two Tone"	Belly; Lil Uzi Vert ^{ft.}	Ahmad Balshe; Symere Woods; Abel Tesfaye; Richard Muñoz; Faris Al-Majed	The Weeknd; The ANMLS	See You Next Wednesday	August 27, 2021	writer producer	
"Unlimited"	Nav; Playboi Carti ^{ft.}	Navraj Goraya; Jordan Carter; Abel Tesfaye; Mark Williams; Raul Cubina; Jarrod Morgan	Ojivolta; Twisco	OMW2 Rexdale	March 28, 2025	writer vocals	
"Wake Up" †	Travis Scott	Jacques Webster; Abel Tesfaye; Michael Dean; Kaan Güneşberk; Adam Feeney; Rupert Thomas; Nima Jahanbin; Paimon Jahanbin	Frank Dukes; Sevn Thomas; Wallis Lane; John Mayer ^{co.}	Astroworld	August 3, 2018	writer vocals	
"Woo"	Rihanna	Chauncey Hollis; Jacques Webster; Jeremy Felton; Abel Tesfaye; Robyn Fenty; Terius Nash; Rachel; Jean Baptist	Hit-Boy; Kuk Harrell; Travis Scott ^{ad.}	Anti	January 28, 2016	writer	
"World Class Sinner / I'm A Freak"	Lily-Rose Depp	Abel Tesfaye; Asa Taccone	Asa Taccone	The Idol Episode 1 (Music from the HBO Original Series)	June 9, 2023	writer	

== Non-commercially released songs ==
As of September 20, 2025, The Weeknd was part of 15 non-commercially released songs under his name. This thus includes songs that were not released under a record label, but were officially put out by the (lead) artist. The following table mentions the other credits Tesfaye has for the songs as well.

List of commercially released songs, crediting The Weeknd as performer
Song	Original				Ref(s)
Song	Performer(s)	Album(s)	Release date	Credits	Ref(s)
"Drunk in Love" (Remix)	The Weeknd	-	February 15, 2014	artist writer producer	
"Enemy"	The Weeknd	-	November 13, 2012	artist writer producer	
"King of the Fall" (Remix)	The Weeknd; Ty Dolla Sign ^{ft.} Belly ^{ft.}	-	October 20, 2014	artist	
"Make It" (DJAmg remixer)	AtariJones; The Weeknd ^{ft.}	Early Catch EP	October 4, 2018	artist	
"Might Not" (Remix)	Belly; Yo Gotti ^{ft.} The Weeknd ^{ft.} 2 Chainz ^{ft.}	-	June 17, 2016	artist	
"Nomads"	Ricky Hil; The Weeknd ^{ft.}	Support Your Local Drug Dealer	February 5, 2013	artist writer	
"On the Couch"	Saturday Night Live; The Weeknd	-	March 7, 2020	artist	
"Pass Dat" (Remix)	The Weeknd; Starrah ^{ft.} Jeremih ^{ft.}	-	December 25, 2015	artist writer	
"Royals" (Remix)	Lorde	-	August 17, 2013	producer	
"Secrets"	Jr. Hi	Virtual Lover EP	October 8, 2013	artist	
"Secrets" (GXNXVS Remix)	Jr. Hi	Virtual Lover EP	October 8, 2013	artist	
"Tell Your Friends" (Remix)	The Weeknd; Drake ^{ft.}	-	September 5, 2015	artist writer	
Title Unknown	The Weeknd	-	April 3, 2021	artist writer producer	
"Trust Issues" (Remix)	The Weeknd	-	June 25, 2011	artist writer	
"Try Me" (Remix)	The Weeknd; Trouble ^{ft.} Swae Lee ^{ft.} Quavo ^{ft.}	-	August 23, 2018	artist	
