= The Weeknd in Japan =

2018 greatest hits album by the Weeknd

Greatest hits album by the Weeknd
- Released: November 21, 2018
- Recorded: 2010–2018
- Studio: Various: South Beach and The Studio at the Setai (Miami Beach, Florida); Studio at the Palms (Las Vegas, Nevada); Abel's Crib and Bota (Toronto, Ontario); Daheala & Co., The Lab, and Mobile; Jungle City, Downtown, and Matza Ball Studio (New York City, New York); Maison de Musique and No Name (California); Wolf Cousins Studio (Stockholm, Sweden); Conway, Henson, MXM, and Westlake Beverly (Los Angeles, California); Gang Studio (Paris, France); The Treehouse X (Suffolk, United Kingdom); Crown Towers Hotel (Melbourne, Australia)
- Genre: R&B
- Length: 60:05
- Label: XO; Republic; Universal Japan
- Producer: Ali Payami; Ben Billions; Daft Punk; DaHeala; DannyBoyStyles; Doc McKinney; Frank Dukes; Illangelo; Mano; Max Martin; Pharrell Williams; The Weeknd

The Weeknd chronology
My Dear Melancholy (2018)	The Weeknd in Japan (2018)	After Hours (2020)

The Weeknd in Japan is the first greatest hits album by Canadian singer-songwriter the Weeknd. It features singles from his first three studio albums: Kiss Land (2013), Beauty Behind the Madness (2015) and Starboy (2016), his 2015 feature, "Might Not", from Belly's eighth mixtape, Up for Days (2015) and the songs "Call Out My Name" and "Wasted Times" from his EP My Dear Melancholy (2018). It was released, digitally and physically, exclusively in Japan on November 21, 2018, by Universal Music Japan. The album's release occurred shortly before the start of the Weeknd Asia Tour (2018).

== Release and artwork ==
The Weeknd in Japan was released on November 21, 2018, by Universal Music Japan to commemorate Tesfaye's first performance in Japan, at the Makuhari Messe in December 2018, as a part of his 2018 tour, the Weeknd Asia Tour. It follows the release of his EP My Dear Melancholy, which was released earlier in the year, and includes various songs from the setlists of his aforementioned tour.

The album's cover incorporates various aspects of the posters which were used to promote the Weeknd Asia Tour (2018).

== Track listing ==
Track listing adapted from iTunes.

The Weeknd in Japan track listing
No.	Title	Writer(s)	Producer(s)	Length
1.	"Wicked Games" (from House of Balloons, 2011)	Abel Tesfaye; Martin McKinney; Carlo Montagnese; Rainer Millar Blancheur	McKinney; Illangelo	5:25
2.	"Wanderlust" (Pharrell remix) from Kiss Land (iTunes edition), 2013)	Tesfaye; Pharrell Williams; Danny Schofield; Ahmad Balshe; Jason Quenneville; Richard Munoz; Joseph Bostani; Selfia Musmin; Albert Tamaela	Williams^{[b]}; The Weeknd; DannyBoyStyles; DaHeala	5:07
3.	"The Hills" (from Beauty Behind the Madness, 2015)	Tesfaye; Balshe; Emmanuel Nickerson; Montagnese	Mano; Illangelo	4:02
4.	"Can't Feel My Face" (from Beauty Behind the Madness)	Tesfaye; Ali Payami; Savan Kotecha; Max Martin; Peter Svensson	Martin; Payami	3:33
5.	"In the Night" (from Beauty Behind the Madness)	Tesfaye; Balshe; Payami; Kotecha; Svensson; Martin	Martin; Payami; The Weeknd^{[a]}	3:55
6.	"Acquainted" (from Beauty Behind the Madness)	Tesfaye; Quenneville; Schofield; Montagnese; Benjamin Diehl	Ben Billions; Illangelo; DaHeala; DannyBoyStyles; The Weeknd	5:48
7.	"Often" (from Beauty Behind the Madness)	Tesfaye; Diehl; Quenneville; Ahmad Balshe; Danny Schofield; Ali Kocatepe; Sabahattin Ali; Osman İşmen	Ben Billions; The Weeknd; DaHeala^{[a]}	4:09
8.	"Might Not" (Belly featuring The Weeknd) (from Up for Days, 2015)	Balshe; Diehl; Tesfaye	Ben Billions	3:45
9.	"Starboy" (featuring Daft Punk) (from Starboy, 2016)	Tesfaye; Thomas Bangalter; Guy-Manuel de Homem-Christo; McKinney; Henry Russell Walter; Quenneville	Daft Punk; Doc McKinney^{[a]}; Cirkut^{[a]}; The Weeknd^{[a]}	3:50
10.	"I Feel It Coming" (featuring Daft Punk) (from Starboy)	Tesfaye; Bangalter; de Homem-Christo; McKinney; Walter; Eric Chedeville	Daft Punk; Doc McKinney^{[a]}; Cirkut^{[a]}; The Weeknd^{[a]}	4:29
11.	"Party Monster" (from Starboy)	Tesfaye; Diehl; McKinney; Balshe; Lana Del Rey	Ben Billions; Doc McKinney; The Weeknd	4:09
12.	"Secrets" (from Starboy)	Tesfaye; McKinney; Walter; Dylan Wiggins; Roland Orzabal; Coz Canler; Jimmy Marinos; Wally Palamarchuk; Mike Skill; Peter Solley	Doc McKinney; The Weeknd; Cirkut	4:25
13.	"Call Out My Name" (from My Dear Melancholy, 2018)	Tesfaye; Adam Feeney; Nicolas Jaar	Frank Dukes	3:48
14.	"Wasted Times" (from My Dear Melancholy)	Tesfaye; Brittany "Starrah" Hazzard; Sonny Moore; Feeney	Frank Dukes; Skrillex^{[a]}	3:40
Total length:				60:05

=== Notes ===
- ^[a] denotes a co-producer
- ^[b] denotes a remix producer
- "Party Monster" features background vocals by Lana Del Rey
- "Wanderlust (Pharrell remix)" features background vocals by Pharrell Williams

== Charts ==
Chart performance for The Weeknd in Japan
Chart (2018)	Peak position
Japanese Albums (Oricon)	157

== Release history ==
Region	Date	Format	Label	Ref.
Japan	November 21, 2018	CD; digital download	Republic	
