= Try Me (The Weeknd song) =

2018 song by the Weeknd

Song by the Weeknd

from the album My Dear Melancholy
- Released: March 30, 2018
- Recorded: 2014–2018
- Length: 3:41
- Label: XO; Republic
- Songwriters: Abel Tesfaye; Ahmad Balshe; Jason Quenneville; Adam Feeney; Michael Williams; Marquel Middlebrooks
- Producers: Mike Will Made It; Marz; Frank Dukes; DaHeala

Music video
- "Try Me" on YouTube

"Try Me" is a song by the Canadian singer-songwriter the Weeknd from his debut extended play, My Dear Melancholy, (2018). The song was written by the Weeknd, Ahmad Balshe, Jason Quenneville, Adam Feeney, Michael Williams and Marquel Middlebrooks. It was produced by Mike Will Made It, Marz, Frank Dukes, and DaHeala.

== Lyrics ==
The song's lyrics revolve around the Weeknd attempting to have a partner leave their current love interest to return to him. Various bars in the song were previously utilized in his cover of Beyoncé's "Drunk in Love".

== Music video ==
On March 30, 2018, a Spotify exclusive vertical video for the song was released alongside one for "Call Out My Name" It was filmed during night time in Los Angeles, California. The video was uploaded to YouTube on March 30, 2021, to celebrate the three year anniversary of My Dear Melancholy.

== Commercial performance ==
The song debuted at number 26 on the US Billboard Hot 100 on the issue dated April 7, 2018.

== Remix ==
On August 23, 2018, a remix of the song featuring Quavo, Swae Lee, and Trouble, premiered on the second episode of the Weeknd's Beats 1 radio show Memento Mori. It was described as the show's highlight upon release.

== Charts ==
=== Weekly charts ===
Chart (2018)	Peak position
Australia (ARIA)	24
Austria (Ö3 Austria Top 40)	49
Canada Hot 100 (Billboard)	7
Czech Republic Singles Digital (ČNS IFPI)	27
Denmark (Tracklisten)	20
France (SNEP)	75
Germany (GfK)	52
Ireland (IRMA)	22
Netherlands (Single Top 100)	43
New Zealand (Recorded Music NZ)	35
Norway (VG-lista)	24
Portugal (AFP)	8
Slovakia Singles Digital (ČNS IFPI)	7
Sweden (Sverigetopplistan)	23
Switzerland (Schweizer Hitparade)	27
UK Singles (OCC)	17
UK Hip Hop/R&B (OCC)	7
US Billboard Hot 100	26
US Hot R&B/Hip-Hop Songs (Billboard)	16

=== Year-end charts ===
Chart (2018)	Position
US Hot R&B Songs (Billboard)	39

== Certifications ==
Region	Certification	Certified units/sales
Australia (ARIA)	Platinum	70,000^{‡}
Brazil (Pro-Música Brasil)	Platinum	40,000^{‡}
Canada (Music Canada)	Gold	40,000^{‡}
France (SNEP)	Gold	100,000^{‡}
New Zealand (RMNZ)	Gold	15,000^{‡}
United Kingdom (BPI)	Silver	200,000^{‡}
United States (RIAA)	Platinum	1,000,000^{‡}
^{‡} Sales+streaming figures based on certification alone.
