= Die for It =

2021 single by Belly and the Weeknd featuring Nas

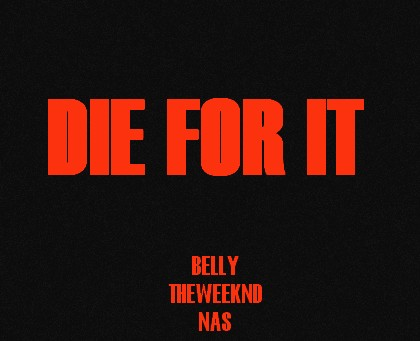

Single by Belly and the Weeknd featuring Nas

from the album See You Next Wednesday
- Released: August 27, 2021
- Length: 3:20
- Label: XO; Republic
- Songwriters: Ahmad Balshe; Abel Tesfaye; Nasir Jones; Sonia Ben Ammar; Sami Hamed; Jason Quenneville; Richard Muñoz; Faris Al-Majed
- Producers: Skinny; DaHeala; The Anmls

Belly singles chronology
"Better Believe" (2021)	"Die for It" (2021)	"Requiem" (2021)

The Weeknd singles chronology
"Take My Breath" (2021)	"Die for It" (2021)	"Hurricane" (2021)

Nas singles chronology
"Rare" (2021)	"Die for It" (2021)	"Big Nas" (2021)

Music video
- "Die for It" on YouTube

"Die for It" is a song by Palestinian-Canadian rapper Belly and Canadian singer the Weeknd, featuring vocals from American rapper Nas. It was released on August 27, 2021, through XO Records and Republic Records as the fourth single from Belly's third studio album, See You Next Wednesday, along with the album. The song was produced by The ANMLS, Skinny, and DaHeala.

== Background ==
On the song, the Weeknd handles the intro and chorus, while Belly handles the first verse and Nas handles the second verse. Belly also talked to Rolling Stone about how he felt about the song and collaboration:

This collaboration felt like something special from the jump. Nas is someone I've always looked up to and learned from my whole life and getting a verse from him was definitely on my bucket list. An artist like Abel comes around once in a lifetime, being able to work with him has been one of my greatest blessings. Having both of them on one song is a dream come true. James Larese killed it as usual and gave us a movie. Even the production was a family affair, shout-out to DaHeala, The Anmls, and DannyboyStyles.

"Die for It" serves as the second collaboration between Belly and the Weeknd on the album, following the previously released single, "Better Believe", alongside American rapper Young Thug. The Weeknd is also involved in the following two tracks of See You Next Wednesday: providing background vocals on "Requiem", featuring fellow Canadian rapper and labelmate Nav, and producing "Two Tone", featuring American rapper Lil Uzi Vert. Belly played the song on Drink Champs on June 11, 2021.

== Music video ==
A music video for the song was released to Belly's YouTube channel alongside the song and album on August 27, 2021. The video starts with Belly walking around a city that shows "an apocalyptic red sky, burning buildings, and abandoned streets littered with newspapers" while smoking marijuana and drinking alcohol. It transitions to the Weeknd singing the first chorus through the screens of televisions that are falling through the sky, but he later comes to perform the remaining choruses in person. Belly performs his verse to the Weeknd going back to the chorus, which then turns to Nas appearing to perform his verse in a church's clock tower and ends with the Weeknd performing the last chorus.

== Credits and personnel ==
Credits adapted from Tidal.

- Belly – lead vocals, songwriting
- The Weeknd – lead vocals, songwriting
- Nas – featured vocals, songwriting
- Sonia Ben Ammar – background vocals, songwriting
- DaHeala – production, songwriting, keyboards, programming
- Skinny – production, songwriting
- The ANMLS – production, songwriting, keyboards, programming
  - Richard Munoz – production, songwriting, keyboards, programming
  - Faris Al-Majed – production, songwriting, keyboards, programming, recording, studio personnel
- DannyBoyStyles – recording, studio personnel
- Shin Kamiyama – recording, studio personnel
- Gabriel Zardes – recording, studio personnel
- Mark Goodchild – recording, studio personnel
- Fabian Marasciullo – mixing, studio personnel
- Colin Leonard – mastering, studio personnel

== Charts ==
Chart performance for "Die for It"
Chart (2021)	Peak position
Canada Hot 100 (Billboard)	65
Sweden (Sverigetopplistan)	85
Global 200 (Billboard)	162
US Bubbling Under Hot 100 (Billboard)	21
