= Wasted Times (The Weeknd song) =

2018 song by The Weeknd

Song by The Weeknd

from the EP My Dear Melancholy
- Released: March 30, 2018
- Length: 3:40
- Label: XO; Republic
- Songwriters: Abel Tesfaye; Brittany Hazzard; Sonny Moore; Adam Feeney; Ryan Vojtesak
- Producers: Frank Dukes; Skrillex

"Wasted Times" is a song by the Canadian singer-songwriter the Weeknd, and serves as the third track from his debut EP, My Dear Melancholy, (2018). The song was written by the Weeknd, Brittany Hazzard, Sonny Moore and Adam Feeney, and was produced by Frank Dukes and Skrillex. It was later included on the Weeknd's 2018 greatest hits album, The Weeknd in Japan, and the deluxe version of his 2021 greatest hits album, The Highlights.

== Critical reception ==
The song was met with positive reviews, with various critics naming it one of the best of the Weeknd's discography. It was also included in various best song of the week lists. The song was ranked the 45th best song of 2018 by Complex due to the Weeknd's emotion and vocals.

== Lyrics ==
The song's lyrics makes references to the Weeknd's previous relationships with model Bella Hadid and singer and actress Selena Gomez, with the Weeknd expressing a desire to rekindle his relationship with Hadid.

== Commercial performance ==
The song debuted at number 27 on the US Billboard Hot 100 on the issue dated April 7, 2018.

== Charts ==
=== Weekly charts ===
Chart (2018)	Peak position
Australia (ARIA)	23
Austria (Ö3 Austria Top 40)	66
Canada Hot 100 (Billboard)	8
Czech Republic Singles Digital (ČNS IFPI)	39
Denmark (Tracklisten)	26
France (SNEP)	111
Germany (GfK)	79
Ireland (IRMA)	24
Netherlands (Single Top 100)	53
New Zealand (Recorded Music NZ)	36
Norway (VG-lista)	35
Portugal (AFP)	13
Slovakia Singles Digital (ČNS IFPI)	11
Sweden (Sverigetopplistan)	30
Switzerland (Schweizer Hitparade)	42
UK Singles (OCC)	18
UK Hip Hop/R&B (OCC)	9
US Billboard Hot 100	27
US Hot R&B/Hip-Hop Songs (Billboard)	17

=== Year-end charts ===
Chart (2018)	Position
US Hot R&B Songs (Billboard)	35

== Certifications ==
Region	Certification	Certified units/sales
Australia (ARIA)	Platinum	70,000^{‡}
Brazil (Pro-Música Brasil)	Platinum	40,000^{‡}
Canada (Music Canada)	Platinum	80,000^{‡}
New Zealand (RMNZ)	Gold	15,000^{‡}
Portugal (AFP)	Gold	5,000^{‡}
United Kingdom (BPI)	Silver	200,000^{‡}
United States (RIAA)	Platinum	1,000,000^{‡}
^{‡} Sales+streaming figures based on certification alone.
