= My Dear Melancholy =

2018 EP by the Weeknd

EP by the Weeknd
- Released: March 30, 2018
- Recorded: October 2017–2018
- Studios: Crown Towers Hotel (Melbourne); Gang (Paris); Henson (Los Angeles)
- Genres: Alternative R&B; R&B; electropop
- Length: 21:50
- Labels: XO; Republic
- Producers: DaHeala; Frank Dukes; Gesaffelstein; Guy-Manuel de Homem-Christo; Marz; Mike Will Made It

The Weeknd chronology
Starboy (2016)	My Dear Melancholy (2018)	The Weeknd in Japan (2018)

Singles from My Dear Melancholy
- 1. "Call Out My Name" Released: April 10, 2018

My Dear Melancholy (stylized as My Dear Melancholy,) is the first EP by the Canadian singer-songwriter the Weeknd, released on March 30, 2018, through XO and Republic Records. Primarily produced by Frank Dukes, who serves as executive producer alongside the Weeknd, it features contributions from Gesaffelstein, Mike Will Made It, DaHeala, Skrillex, and Daft Punk's Guy-Manuel de Homem-Christo, among others.

My Dear Melancholy is described as a return to the darker style of the Weeknd's earlier work, evident in Trilogy (2012) and Kiss Land (2013). The EP was supported by the single "Call Out My Name", which peaked at No. 4 on the US Billboard Hot 100. It received generally favourable reviews and debuted at No. 1 on the US Billboard 200.

== Background and release ==
Prior to the creation of My Dear Melancholy, the Weeknd had an album ready for release that had a more upbeat tone. As the circumstances in his life changed, he completely scrapped the project, no longer feeling a connection with it. In March 2018, the American rapper Travis Scott likened new material he had heard from the Weeknd's new project to when he had first heard the artist. Tesfaye suggested that he was in the finishing stages of completing new work, sharing multiple silent videos on Instagram of a recording studio, with the caption "mastering". This followed several months of in-studio pictures shared on the platform. On March 28, he hinted at the release of a new album, posting a screenshot of a text-message conversation between creative director La Mar Taylor and himself, concerning a potential release that week. The next day, he shared the album's cover art, alongside its title, My Dear Melancholy.

Following the EP's release, music videos for "Call Out My Name" and "Try Me" were released through Spotify. During an interview with GQ in 2021, the Weeknd said of the EP, "I made it in like three weeks. I knew exactly what I wanted to say. I knew how I wanted it to sound—and that was it."

== Composition and lyrics ==
My Dear Melancholy has been described as "darker" than the Weeknd's previous studio releases Beauty Behind the Madness and Starboy, and a return to his earlier work, though with more electronic music-based production. Israel Daramola from Spin characterized Tesfaye as "returning to the darkened drug den sounds of his earlier work". The EP has been classified as an alternative R&B, R&B, and electropop record, with production credits from Skrillex and Guy-Manuel de Homem-Christo from Daft Punk. It also features Gesaffelstein, who produced the tracks "I Was Never There" and "Hurt You".

Lyrically, My Dear Melancholy is oriented around heartbreak and anger, focusing on Tesfaye's past relationships, mainly his highly publicized romances with model Bella Hadid and singer Selena Gomez. In an interview with Esquire in 2020, Tesfaye described the EP as a "cathartic piece of art". The theme is a complete change from the Weeknd's past two projects, which were pop-based and more mainstream. On the album, the artist mentions Gomez's kidney transplant operation and her relationship with Justin Bieber. The Weeknd reworks Gomez's lyrics from the song "Same Old Love" on the track "Wasted Times" in a way that Billboard described as "tormenting".

== Critical reception ==
My Dear Melancholy ratings
Aggregate scores
Source	Rating
AnyDecentMusic?	5.7/10
Metacritic	63/100
Review scores
Source	Rating
AllMusic	2.5/5 stars
The A.V. Club	C
Consequence	C+
Exclaim!	8/10
The Guardian	3/5 stars
HipHopDX	4.0/5
NME	3/5 stars
Pitchfork	6.5/10
PopMatters	5/10
Rolling Stone	3.5/5 stars

My Dear Melancholy was met with generally favourable reviews. At Metacritic, which assigns a normalized rating out of 100 to reviews from professional publications, the album received an average score of 63, based on 16 reviews. Aggregator AnyDecentMusic? gave it 5.7 out of 10, based on their assessment of critical consensus.

Alex Petridis of The Guardian stated that My Dear Melancholy "abandons the pick'n'mix and indeed hit-and-miss approach of previous album Starboy in favour of something more cohesive: uniformly downbeat and twilit, it flows really well", but criticized its lyrical content. In a positive review, Ryan B. Patrick of Exclaim! commented that the project serves "as a soft reset of sorts, a musical palette cleanser that takes stock of what the Weeknd has accomplished thus far". For NME, Jordan Bassett called the album "thrilling", praising its tight and concise nature and "notable moments of stylistic brilliance" evident in Gesaffelstein's contributions, though he criticized its lack of character, noting that the Weeknd's predictability has led to his "impact [becoming] increasingly scattershot". Online publication HipHopDX commented that the EP "doesn't break any new ground, and — as he's done in the past — revisits elements of previous projects. However, without the bloated tracklist of Starboy, and any attempt to please an audience outside of his core, the lack of innovation doesn't seem to take away from the concise, focused, conceptual nature of this well-produced R&B gem".

In a mixed review for Pitchfork, Larry Fitzmaurice wrote that the project "finds him in limbo between the bleary-eyed vibe of his early mixtapes and the bulletproof pop stylings of his last two albums", praising the record's production and "Tesfaye's still-sharp ear for cool, contemporary sounds", but also criticizing similarities to his earlier work—specifically between "Call Out My Name" and "Earned It", as well as "Hurt You" and "I Feel It Coming"—and concluding that "it's too early in this stage of Tesfaye's career to so obviously attempt to replicate past glories". Israel Daramola of Spin criticized the album's lyrics as "mopey" and "whiny" and its production as "endlessly sludgy and murky", writing that the album "is incredibly self-involved and self-pitying, nothing but surface-level introspection that shows a lot of emotion but none of it in the service of anything but the singer's ego".

=== Year-end lists ===
Select year-end rankings of My Dear Melancholy
Publication	List	Rank	Ref.
ABC News	50 Best Albums of 2018	20	
Complex	50 Best Albums of 2018	46	
Vulture	15 Best Albums of 2018	13	

=== Industry awards ===
Awards and nominations for My Dear Melancholy
Year	Ceremony	Category	Result	Ref.
2019	Billboard Music Awards	Top R&B Album	Nominated	

== Commercial performance ==
My Dear Melancholy was streamed more than 26 million times on its first day of release on Apple Music, double the amount of streams that were obtained on Spotify, according to Republic Records, though Spotify claims that My Dear Melancholy was able to rake up 29 million streams in 24 hours. The EP was projected to move between 165,000 and 180,000 album-equivalent units in the first week and eventually moved 169,000 album-equivalent units, with 68,000 being pure sales, hitting No. 1 on the US Billboard 200. My Dear Melancholy was also the shortest album, by track count, to top the Billboard 200 in eight years, a feat previously accomplished by Glee: The Music, Journey to Regionals. As of July 2018, it had sold 117,000 copies in the US.

== Track listing ==
My Dear Melancholy track listing
No.	Title	Writer(s)	Producer(s)	Length
1.	"Call Out My Name"	Abel Tesfaye; Adam Feeney; Nicolas Jaar	Frank Dukes	3:48
2.	"Try Me"	Tesfaye; Ahmad Balshe; Jason Quenneville; Feeney; Michael Williams; Marquel Middlebrooks	Mike Will Made It; Marz; Frank Dukes; DaHeala	3:41
3.	"Wasted Times"	Tesfaye; Brittany Hazzard; Sonny Moore; Feeney; Ryan Vojtesak	Frank Dukes; Skrillex^{[a]}	3:40
4.	"I Was Never There" (with Gesaffelstein)	Tesfaye; Mike Lévy; Feeney	Gesaffelstein; Frank Dukes	4:01
5.	"Hurt You" (with Gesaffelstein)	Tesfaye; Lévy; Guy-Manuel de Homem-Christo; Henry Walter	Gesaffelstein; de Homem-Christo; Cirkut^{[a]}	3:50
6.	"Privilege"	Tesfaye; Quenneville; Feeney	Frank Dukes; DaHeala	2:50
Total length:				21:50

Spotify reissue bonus track
No.	Title	Writer(s)	Producer(s)	Length
7.	"Call Out My Name – A Cappella"	Tesfaye; Feeney; Jaar	Frank Dukes	3:44
Total length:				25:34

Notes

- ^{^[a]} signifies a co-producer

== Personnel ==
Credits adapted from Tidal.

- DaHeala – keyboards, programming (tracks 2, 6)
- Shin Kamiyama – engineering (tracks 1–6)
- Florian Lagatta – engineering (track 5)
- Jaycen Joshua – mixing (tracks 1–6)
- Skrillex – mixing (track 3)
- Tom Norris – mixing (track 3)
- David Nakaji – mixing assistance (tracks 1–6)
- Maddox Chhim – mixing assistance (tracks 1, 2, 4, 5, 6)
- Ben Milchev – mixing assistance (track 3)
- Chris Athens – mastering

== Charts ==
=== Weekly charts ===
Chart performance for My Dear Melancholy
Chart (2018)	Peak position
Australian Albums (ARIA)	3
Austrian Albums (Ö3 Austria)	8
Belgian Albums (Ultratop Flanders)	3
Belgian Albums (Ultratop Wallonia)	22
Canadian Albums (Billboard)	1
Czech Albums (ČNS IFPI)	2
Danish Albums (Hitlisten)	1
Dutch Albums (Album Top 100)	3
Finnish Albums (Suomen virallinen lista)	3
French Albums (SNEP)	17
German Albums (Offizielle Top 100)	7
Greek Albums (IFPI)	31
Irish Albums (IRMA)	2
Italian Albums (FIMI)	24
Japanese Albums (Oricon)	170
New Zealand Albums (RMNZ)	2
Norwegian Albums (VG-lista)	1
Polish Albums (ZPAV)	36
Portuguese Albums (AFP)	16
Scottish Albums (Official Charts)	8
Slovak Albums (ČNS IFPI)	2
South Korean Albums (Gaon)	50
South Korean International Albums (Gaon)	1
Spanish Albums (Promusicae)	45
Swedish Albums (Sverigetopplistan)	1
Swiss Albums (Schweizer Hitparade)	4
UK Albums (Official Charts)	3
UK R&B Albums (Official Charts)	1
US Billboard 200	1
US Top R&B/Hip-Hop Albums (Billboard)	1

=== Year-end charts ===
2018 year-end chart performance for My Dear Melancholy
Chart (2018)	Position
Australian Albums (ARIA)	59
Australian Hip Hop/R&B Albums (ARIA)	22
Belgian Albums (Ultratop Flanders)	80
Canadian Albums (Billboard)	37
Danish Albums (Hitlisten)	63
French Albums (SNEP)	183
Icelandic Albums (Tónlistinn)	29
Lithuanian Albums (AGATA)	30
South Korean International Albums (Gaon)	53
Swedish Albums (Sverigetopplistan)	29
UK Albums (OCC)	98
US Billboard 200	48
US Top R&B/Hip-Hop Albums (Billboard)	33

2019 year-end chart performance for My Dear Melancholy
Chart (2019)	Position
Australian Albums (ARIA)	59

2022 year-end chart performance for My Dear Melancholy
Chart (2022)	Position
Australian Hip Hop/R&B Albums (ARIA)	95

2023 year-end chart performance for My Dear Melancholy
Chart (2023)	Position
Icelandic Albums (Tónlistinn)	84

== Certifications ==
Certifications for My Dear Melancholy
Region	Certification	Certified units/sales
Australia (ARIA)	Gold	35,000^{‡}
Austria (IFPI Austria)	Gold	7,500^{‡}
Canada (Music Canada)	Platinum	80,000^{‡}
Denmark (IFPI Danmark)	Platinum	20,000^{‡}
Italy (FIMI)	Gold	25,000^{‡}
New Zealand (RMNZ)	Platinum	15,000^{‡}
Poland (ZPAV)	Platinum	20,000^{‡}
United Kingdom (BPI)	Gold	100,000^{‡}
United States (RIAA)	Platinum	1,000,000^{‡}
^{‡} Sales+streaming figures based on certification alone.
