= Avatar: The Way of Water (soundtrack) =

Avatar: The Way of Water (Original Motion Picture Soundtrack)

Soundtrack album by Simon Franglen
- Released: December 16, 2022
- Recorded: July–November 2022
- Studios: Newman Scoring Stage, 20th Century Studios; Abbey Road Studios; The Village; Stella Maris Chapel
- Genres: Film soundtrack; film score
- Length: 76:00
- Label: Hollywood
- Producer: Simon Franglen

Simon Franglen chronology
Brahmāstra: Part One – Shiva (2022)	Avatar: The Way of Water (Original Motion Picture Soundtrack) (2022)	Avatar: Fire and Ash (Original Motion Picture Soundtrack) (2025)

Singles from Avatar: The Way of Water (Original Motion Picture Soundtrack)
- 1. "Nothing Is Lost (You Give Me Strength)" Released: December 15, 2022

Avatar: The Way of Water (Original Motion Picture Soundtrack) is the soundtrack album to the 2022 epic science fiction film Avatar: The Way of Water, directed and co-produced by James Cameron, a sequel to Avatar (2009). The album featured an original score composed by Simon Franglen and original music by Canadian singer–songwriter the Weeknd. Franglen, a friend of composer James Horner who previously composed the score for Avatar, had worked as a record producer and arranger for that film and afterwards, took on scoring duties for The Way of Water and the forthcoming sequels in Avatar franchise, following Horner's death in a plane crash in June 2015.

The album, which accompanies Franglen's original score, featured two original songs—"Song Chord" performed by Franglen and Zoe Saldaña, and "Nothing Is Lost (You Give Me Strength)" performed by The Weeknd. The latter was released as a single from the album on December 15, 2022, and the following day, on December 16, the full soundtrack was released by Hollywood Records alongside the film. A score album titled Avatar: The Way of Water (Original Score), featuring additional tracks from Franglen's score was released on December 20.

== Development ==
Avatar composer James Horner intended to be part of the sequel as well as the forthcoming films in the franchise, before his death in a plane crash on June 22, 2015. Simon Franglen who associated with Horner as a record producer and arranger in of his films, reported to score for the film in December 2019. His involvement was officially confirmed by Landau in August 2021, where he would compose for all of the forthcoming films. Franglen had notably completed the score for The Magnificent Seven (2016), post-Horner's death. He also composed the original score for Pandora – The World of Avatar, the theme park attraction based on the film, and also arranged Horner's theme from the film, as Franglen wanted to "keep the core of the film's music together". Hence, by 2017, he was ready to score for the film when Cameron asked him to read the scripts for the sequels.

Franglen wanted to honor the legacy of Horner, by bringing new themes into the score, adding that "The vast majority of it is fresh and new because it's a new film, and there are new characters in those new places. But there are moments when it's important to have the original themes there. I hope that the fans of the original will like and recognize that we've tried to keep that because also there's a flow for a series of films. Avatar isn't a standalone film. It's part of a whole canon of movies, we hope. Therefore, bringing some of the score from A1 into A2 I thought was appropriate and a good thing to do."

Franglen designed unique Pandoran musical instruments for the film, which he said was an "unexpected delight". The instruments were 3D-printed by the art department and the props team. He was tasked with bringing new textures, voices and elements to the score. He commented, "The sea is integral to many of the themes and motifs in my score; the scintillation of light, the ebb and flow of waves, and the connection of the Na'vi [to the] water were all inspirations".

Recording for the film's score began on July 29, 2022, at the Newman Scoring Stage at 20th Century Studios in Los Angeles, with a 100-piece orchestra recording the score. Franglen said that he was able to "feature a great diversity of singers and featured musicians from across the world, all bringing their unique textures to the score", such as bringing the Tenebrae choir ensemble from London and Pacific islands choral music. The scale of the music mixing exceeded up to 1,000 tracks.

== Original songs ==
The Way of Water featured two original songs, co-written and produced by Franglen. "The Songcord" performed by Zoe Saldaña, was announced at the nominations for 13th Hollywood Music in Media Awards in the Best Original Song in a Feature Film in November 2022. Cameron described the song on the first page of the script, where it refers to "telling the story of the Na'vi family or clan ancestry through song, accompanied by a device with beads strung together on twine or thread". He further suggested Franglen that the song needed an "ancient haunting quality with the warmth of a mother's love". Hence, he wrote the lyrics of the song in Na'vi and performed live on the stage with Saldaña in front of 100 crew members.

"Nothing Is Lost (You Give Me Strength)" is the end credits song for the film, which Cameron wanted it to be "hopeful and about fighting for the survival of family". Franglen roped Canadian singer the Weeknd to perform the track and sent him thematic and lyrical concepts, where he wanted to bridge the world of Pandora with the musician. Additionally, the Swedish supergroup Swedish House Mafia helped Franglen in producing the song, so as to blend their distinctive pop sensibility, with the Na'vi voices, tribal drums, and the orchestra, that covered the musical world. Weeknd recorded the final vocals for the song in Los Angeles, while the orchestral portions were recorded at the Newman Scoring Stage, during the final scoring sessions in November 2022.

== Release and promotion ==
The soundtrack to Avatar: The Way of Water was released alongside the film on December 16, 2022, by Hollywood Records, with "Nothing Is Lost (You Give Me Strength)" serving as the lead single from the album released on December 15. The album featured 20 tracks from Franglen's original score, with 10 additional tracks released in a separate score album on December 20.

== Reception ==
The film's soundtrack received largely positive reviews from critics. In a review from New York Post, Johnny Oleksinski wrote "Pandora also continues to be brought to life through music that, while composed this time by Simon Franglen, still bows to the wondrous work of the late James Horner". David Rooney of The Hollywood Reporter said that the film "misses the heart-pounding suspense and tribal themes of James Horner's score for the 2009 film, but composer Simon Franglen capably maintains the tension where it counts".

== Track listing ==
Avatar: The Way of Water (Original Motion Picture Soundtrack)
No.	Title	Performer(s)	Length
1.	"Nothing Is Lost (You Give Me Strength)"	The Weeknd	4:28
2.	"Into the Water"		3:40
3.	"Happiness Is Simple" (Contains Avatar Theme by James Horner)		2:22
4.	"A New Star"		2:57
5.	"Converging Paths"		1:45
6.	"Rescue and Loss"		6:40
7.	"Family Is Our Fortress"		3:07
8.	"Hometree"		3:28
9.	"The Way of Water"		2:30
10.	"Payakan"		3:30
11.	"Mighty Eywa"		4:13
12.	"Friends"		1:47
13.	"Cove of the Ancestors"		2:46
14.	"The Tulkun Return"		2:51
15.	"The Hunt"		5:48
16.	"Na'vi Attack"		4:44
17.	"Eclipse"		3:13
18.	"Bad Parents"		3:23
19.	"Knife Fight"		2:48
20.	"From Darkness to Light"		4:14
21.	"The Spirit Tree"		2:58
22.	"The Songcord"	Zoe Saldaña	3:20
Total length:			76:00

Avatar: The Way of Water (Original Score)
No.	Title	Performer(s)	Length
1.	"Leaving Home"		3:28
2.	"Songcord Opening"		1:58
3.	"Happiness Is Simple" (Contains Avatar Theme by James Horner)		2:22
4.	"A New Star"		2:57
5.	"Train Attack"		3:03
6.	"Masks Off"		3:22
7.	"Converging Paths"		1:45
8.	"Rescue and Loss"		6:40
9.	"Family Is Our Fortress"		3:07
10.	"Sanctuary"		2:55
11.	"Into the Water"		3:40
12.	"Training Montage"		2:15
13.	"The Way of Water"		2:30
14.	"Where the Men Hunt"		1:45
15.	"Payakan"		3:30
16.	"Mighty Eywa"		4:13
17.	"Friends"		1:47
18.	"Cove of the Ancestors"		2:46
19.	"The Tulkun Return"		2:51
20.	"The Hunt"		5:48
21.	"Kids in Peril"		3:36
22.	"Na'vi Attack"		4:44
23.	"A Farewell to Arm"		2:26
24.	"Eclipse"		3:13
25.	"Bad Parents"		3:23
26.	"Knife Fight"		2:48
27.	"World Upside Down"		2:03
28.	"From Darkness to Light"		4:14
29.	"Family"		3:14
30.	"Songcord Chapter"		2:10
31.	"The Spirit Tree"		2:58
32.	"The Songcord"	Zoe Saldaña	3:20
Total length:			100:40

== Charts ==
Chart performance for Avatar: The Way of Water (Original Motion Picture Soundtrack)
Chart (2022–2023)	Peak position
Belgian Albums (Ultratop Wallonia)	156
French Albums (SNEP)	137
UK Album Downloads (OCC)	43
UK Soundtrack Albums (OCC)	6
US Top Soundtracks (Billboard)	23

== Accolades ==
Award	Date of ceremony	Category	Recipient(s)	Result	Ref.
Hollywood Music in Media Awards	November 16, 2022	Best Original Score in a Sci-Fi/Fantasy Film	Simon Franglen	Won	
Hollywood Music in Media Awards	November 16, 2022	Best Original Song in a Feature Film	Simon Franglen and Zoe Saldaña for "Song Chord"	Nominated	
Hollywood Music in Media Awards	November 16, 2022	Song/Score — Trailer	Simon Franglen for "Trailer"	Nominated	
Ivor Novello Awards	May 18, 2024	Best Original Film Score	Simon Franglen	Nominated	
