= Better Believe =

2021 single by Belly, the Weeknd, and Young Thug

Single by Belly, the Weeknd, and Young Thug

from the album See You Next Wednesday
- Released: July 22, 2021
- Length: 3:27
- Label: XO; Republic
- Songwriters: Ahmad Balshe; Abel Tesfaye; Jeffery Williams; Xavier Dotson; Danny Schofield; Richard Munoz; Faris Al-Majed
- Producers: Zaytoven; DannyBoyStyles; The ANMLS

Belly singles chronology
"Zero Love" (2021)	"Better Believe" (2021)	"Die for It" (2021)

The Weeknd singles chronology
"You Right" (2021)	"Better Believe" (2021)	"Take My Breath" (2021)

Young Thug singles chronology
"Emotions" (2021)	"Better Believe" (2021)	"Tick Tock" (2021)

Music video
- "Better Believe" on YouTube

"Better Believe" is a song by Palestinian-Canadian rapper Belly, Canadian singer the Weeknd, and American rapper Young Thug. It was released on July 22, 2021, through XO Records and Republic Records as the third single from Belly's third studio album, See You Next Wednesday. The song was produced by Zaytoven, DannyBoyStyles, and The ANMLS.

== Background ==
On the song, The Weeknd handles the first verse, pre-chorus, and chorus, while Belly handles the second verse and Young Thug raps the third and final verse. Before the song, each artist had collaborated with each other in the past. Belly and The Weeknd are both signed to XO Records, which is led by the latter; they have worked together twice previously, both on Belly's singles, "Might Not" and "What You Want", released in 2015 and 2018, respectively. Belly and Young Thug have teamed up once before, on the former's track, "Consuela" alongside Moroccan-American rapper Zack, released in 2016. The Weeknd and Young Thug have also united once prior to "Better Believe", on the remix of the former's single, "Reminder" alongside American rapper ASAP Rocky, released in 2017.

== Music video ==
A music video for the song was released to Belly's YouTube channel alongside the song on July 22, 2021. The "glossy, action-packed music video" was directed by Christian Breslauer. The video is the one of two parts, and it includes self-driving expensive cars. Belly is burning along with some buildings that are on fire, The Weeknd drives a BMW and is seen later standing with McLaren P1 drifting behind him while Young Thug is seen with a slime green tank truck.

== Credits and personnel ==
Credits adapted from Tidal.

- Belly – vocals, songwriting
- The Weeknd – vocals, songwriting
- Young Thug – vocals, songwriting
- Zaytoven – production, songwriting
- DannyBoyStyles – production, songwriting, keyboards, programming
- The ANMLS – production, songwriting
  - Richard Munoz – production, songwriting
  - Faris Al-Majed – production, songwriting, recording engineer, studio personnel
- Shin Kamiyama – recording engineer, studio personnel
- Fabian Marasciullo – mixing engineer, studio personnel
- Colin Leonard – mastering engineer, studio personnel

== Charts ==
Chart performance for "Better Believe"
Chart (2021)	Peak position
Canada Hot 100 (Billboard)	23
Canada CHR/Top 40 (Billboard)	48
Global 200 (Billboard)	79
New Zealand Hot Singles (RMNZ)	15
Sweden Heatseeker (Sverigetopplistan)	7
Switzerland (Schweizer Hitparade)	99
US Billboard Hot 100	88
US Hot R&B/Hip-Hop Songs (Billboard)	31
US R&B/Hip-Hop Airplay (Billboard)	47
US Rhythmic Airplay (Billboard)	33

== Release history ==
Release history and formats for "Better Believe"
Country	Date	Format	Label	Ref.
Various	July 22, 2021	Digital download; streaming	XO; Republic	
