= Nothing Is Lost (You Give Me Strength) =

- Japanese cover art

Single by the Weeknd

from the album Avatar: The Way of Water (Original Motion Picture Soundtrack)
- Released: December 15, 2022
- Recorded: 2022
- Genre: Synth-pop; electro-R&B
- Length: 4:27
- Label: XO; Hollywood; Republic
- Songwriters: Abel Tesfaye; Steve Angello; Sebastian Ingrosso; Axel Hedfors; Simon Franglen
- Producers: Swedish House Mafia; Simon Franglen

The Weeknd singles chronology
"Less than Zero" (2022)	"Nothing Is Lost (You Give Me Strength)" (2022)	"Creepin'" (2023)

Music video
- "Nothing is Lost (You Give Me Strength)" on YouTube

"Nothing Is Lost (You Give Me Strength)" is a song by Canadian singer the Weeknd. It was released by XO, Hollywood Records and Republic Records on December 15, 2022, as the lead single of the soundtrack for the epic science fiction action-adventure film Avatar: The Way of Water (2022). The song was written by the Weeknd, who composed with production trio Swedish House Mafia, along with the film's score composer, Simon Franglen. Musically, "Nothing Is Lost (You Give Me Strength)" is a "bombastic" ballad, featuring an "anthemic" melody and prominent drums in its chorus, accompanied with occasional tribal chants in the background.

== Background and release ==
On December 4, 2022, the Weeknd posted a teaser of the soundtrack on his social media, hinting at the release date December 16. On December 7, a new trailer for the James Cameron-directed film was released. The trailer itself was titled after the song. It features a prominent snippet of the song with vocals that "softly play throughout the trailer". According to a press release, the song seeks to "speak to the epic scope, breathtaking action, and thrilling drama of the film itself". In interview at the film premiere, the producer Jon Landau told to Complex that "when (the Weeknd) came in, Swedish House Mafia came up with the concept of the song, and they embraced working with our composer, Simon Franglen. And together, they came up with a song that is true to who The Weeknd is but is organic to our film. And that's what was important to us. We didn't want just something to come on at the end of the movie that felt outside of it, but he embraced that collaboration, and his voice, oh my God".

== Composition ==
The Weeknd self-wrote the lyrics to "Nothing Is Lost (You Give Me Strength)" and composed the song's melody with production trio Swedish House Mafia and Simon Franglen. Since release, the song has been described by music and film critics as a "dramatic" and "bombastic" ballad with a "trance-adjacent beat and pulsing synthesizers" featuring an "anthemic", orchestral melody, and "thundering" drums in its chorus.

== Music video ==
A music video for "Nothing Is Lost (You Give Me Strength)" was released on January 16, 2023. The filming took place in Krabi, Thailand in December 2022. Most of the actors in the music video are Thai.

== Charts ==
Chart performance for "Nothing Is Lost (You Give Me Strength)"
Chart (2022–2023)	Peak position
Australia New Music (ARIA)	19
Canada Hot 100 (Billboard)	88
Canada CHR/Top 40 (Billboard)	40
Croatia (HRT)	73
France (SNEP)	140
Global 200 (Billboard)	156
Hungary (Single Top 40)	39
Japan Hot Overseas (Billboard Japan)	6
New Zealand Hot Singles (RMNZ)	5
South Korea Download (Circle)	200
UK Singles Downloads (OCC)	79
UK Singles Sales (OCC)	84
US Bubbling Under Hot 100 (Billboard)	23
US Digital Song Sales (Billboard)	36

== Release history ==
Release dates and formats for "Nothing Is Lost (You Give Me Strength)"
Region	Date	Format	Label	Ref.
Various	December 15, 2022	Digital download; streaming	XO; Hollywood; Republic	
