= I Was Never There =

2018 song by The Weeknd and Gesaffelstein

Song by the Weeknd and Gesaffelstein

from the EP My Dear Melancholy
- Released: March 30, 2018
- Genre: Alternative R&B; dark wave
- Length: 4:01
- Label: XO; Republic
- Songwriters: Abel Tesfaye; Mike Lévy; Adam Feeney
- Producers: Gesaffelstein; Frank Dukes

"I Was Never There" is a song by the Canadian singer-songwriter the Weeknd and French DJ Gesaffelstein, from the former's first extended play, My Dear Melancholy (2018). The song was written by the Weeknd, Gesaffelstein, and Frank Dukes, and was produced by the latter two. The song is the first of three collaborations between the two artists and the second of the songs to go viral on TikTok in the early 2020s, after "Lost in the Fire".

== Critical reception ==
The song was ranked the Weeknd's 33rd best song by Rolling Stone due to Gesaffelstein's production and the Weeknd's emotional vocal delivery.

== Lyrics ==
The song's lyrics makes references to the Weeknd's previous relationships with model Bella Hadid and singer and actress Selena Gomez.

== Commercial performance ==
The song debuted at number 35 on the US Billboard Hot 100 on the issue dated April 7, 2018. Later on, throughout 2022, "I Was Never There" saw an increase in consumption as the song went viral on the social media platform TikTok alongside several other tracks by the Weeknd, which led to the song entering the Billboard Global 200 chart at 159 and eventually peaking at 119.

== Charts ==
=== Weekly charts ===
Weekly chart performance for "I Was Never There"
Chart (2018–2022)	Peak position
Australia (ARIA)	40
Canada Hot 100 (Billboard)	12
Czech Republic Singles Digital (ČNS IFPI)	42
Denmark (Tracklisten)	37
France (SNEP)	112
Germany (GfK)	91
Greece International (IFPI)	5
Global 200 (Billboard)	119
Ireland (IRMA)	39
Lithuania (AGATA)	43
Netherlands (Single Top 100)	67
New Zealand Heatseekers (Recorded Music NZ)	1
Portugal (AFP)	23
Slovakia Singles Digital (ČNS IFPI)	15
Sweden (Sverigetopplistan)	40
Switzerland (Schweizer Hitparade)	94
UK Audio Streaming (Official Charts)	42
US Billboard Hot 100	35
US Hot R&B/Hip-Hop Songs (Billboard)	20

=== Year-end charts ===
Year-end chart performance for "I Was Never There"
Chart (2022)	Position
Lithuania (AGATA)	82

== Certifications ==
Certifications for "I Was Never There"
Region	Certification	Certified units/sales
Australia (ARIA)	2× Platinum	140,000^{‡}
Austria (IFPI Austria)	Platinum	30,000^{‡}
Brazil (Pro-Música Brasil)	Diamond	160,000^{‡}
Canada (Music Canada)	Gold	40,000^{‡}
Denmark (IFPI Danmark)	Gold	45,000^{‡}
France (SNEP)	Platinum	200,000^{‡}
Italy (FIMI)	Gold	50,000^{‡}
New Zealand (RMNZ)	2× Platinum	60,000^{‡}
Poland (ZPAV)	Platinum	50,000^{‡}
Portugal (AFP)	Platinum	10,000^{‡}
United Kingdom (BPI)	Platinum	600,000^{‡}
United States (RIAA)	Platinum	1,000,000^{‡}
Streaming
Greece (IFPI Greece)	3× Platinum	6,000,000^{†}
^{‡} Sales+streaming figures based on certification alone.^{†} Streaming-only figures based on certification alone.
