= Skinny (rapper) =

Saudi-American rapper and record producer (born 1990)

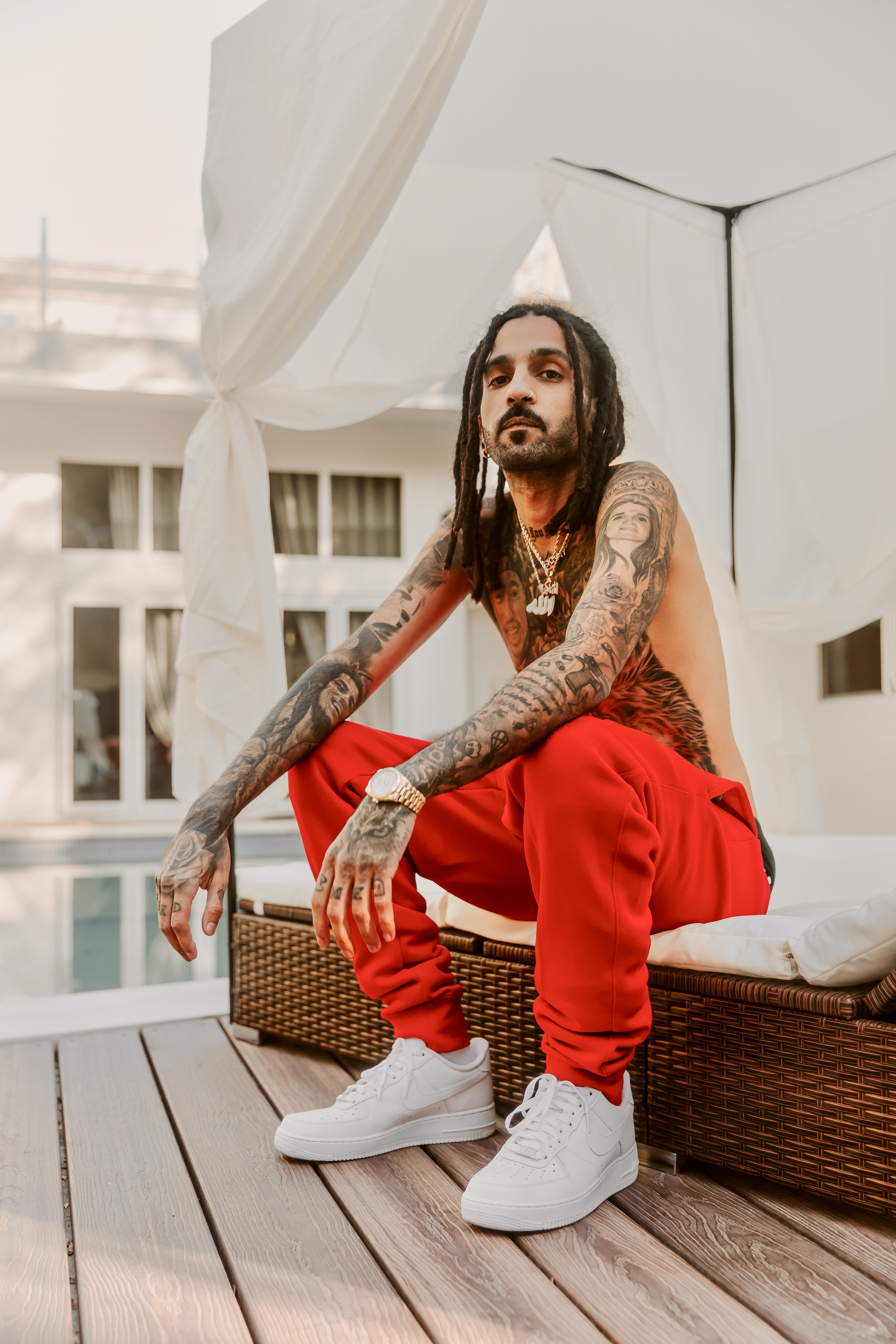
- Skinny in 2020

Background information
- Also known as: $kinny
- Born: Sami Hamed; March 16, 1990 (age 36); Riyadh, Saudi Arabia
- Genres: Hip hop; trap; gangsta rap
- Occupations: Rapper; songwriter; record producer
- Years active: 2012–present

Sami Hamed (Arabic: سامي حامد; born March 16, 1990), best known as Skinny (stylized as $kinny), is a Saudi-American rapper and record producer.

== Early life ==
Hamed was born in Riyadh, Saudi Arabia, to an American mother and Saudi Arabian father, who had met in California. After they separated, Skinny spent summers with his mother in Los Angeles. While his family exposed him to different types of music like Nirvana, he discovered rap in Los Angeles inadvertently buying a CD that featured music from 50 Cent, who became one of his biggest influences.

== Career ==
He released his debut mixtape Ghetto Disneyland on April 7, 2014. The mixtape received positive reviews, praising his lyrics and the mixtape being mostly self-produced. On May 13, 2015, he released a music video for his self-produced first single "Ride" off his upcoming EP 1999 Parachutes.

On July 19, 2019, Skinny released the single and music video for "Never Snitch (Alhumdulilah)". The song charted on Apple Music Middle East, and is on YouTube. On September 13, 2019, Skinny released his album, Thank You For Nothing. The album reached a peak of number one on Apple Music Middle East.

== Discography ==
Studio albums

- Ghetto Disneyland (2014)
- 1999 Parachutes (2016)
- Thank You For Nothing (2019)
- Have A Nice Trip (2022)

Singles

- Ride (2015)
- Spaceships In the Sky (2015)
- Living Like (feat. Skeme) (2015)
- Cookies & Swisher Sweets (2016)
- Best Friends (2016)
- Wonderful (2016)
- Drugs (2017)
- Night Shift (2017)
- Gra$$ (2017)
- No Problems (2018)
- Enemies (2018)
- Blessings (feat. Liife) (2018)
- Pass Out (2018)
- Never Snitch (2019)
- My Blocka (2020)
- Saudi Most Wanted (2022)
- Tamam (feat. Fat Money) (2022)
- Salam (with Swizz Beatz & French Montana) (2022)

Extended plays

- Late Night Blvd - EP (2017)
