= Call Out My Name =

2018 single by the Weeknd

Single by the Weeknd

from the EP My Dear Melancholy
- Released: April 10, 2018
- Genre: R&B
- Length: 3:48
- Label: XO; Republic
- Songwriters: Abel Tesfaye; Adam Feeney; Nicolas Jaar
- Producer: Frank Dukes

The Weeknd singles chronology
"Pray for Me" (2018)	"Call Out My Name" (2018)	"What You Want" (2018)

Music video
- "Call Out My Name" on YouTube

"Call Out My Name" is a song by the Canadian singer-songwriter The Weeknd from his debut extended play, My Dear Melancholy (2018). The song was co-written by The Weeknd and producer Frank Dukes, with musician Nicolas Jaar receiving writing credits for the sampling of his 2016 song "Killing Time". The song was sent to rhythmic contemporary radio on April 10, 2018, as the EP's only single.

== Composition ==
According to musicnotes.com, the song is performed in the key of E♭ minor with a tempo of 45 beats per minute in compound duple (6/8) time. The chords alternate between G♯m and D♯m. The Weeknd's vocals span two octaves, from D♯_{3} to D♯_{5}.

== Critical reception ==
Alexis Petridis of The Guardian called it the least interesting track on My Dear Melancholy: "it offers up the kind of beige boo-hoo balladry that Sam Smith specialises in, albeit tricked out with more interesting sonic touches: the piano sounding like it was recorded underwater, the rest of the track echoing and ghostly."

In 2022, Seventeen placed the song on its "46 Songs About Cheating If You Need To Cry Your Eyes Out" list.

== Commercial performance ==
"Call Out My Name" earned the largest first-day Spotify stream count of any song released in 2018. The song was also streamed 6 million times on its first day on Apple Music. The song debuted at number one in his native Canada, Malaysia, Greece, and Slovakia, his first number one debut in the former two; as well as at number four on the US Billboard Hot 100 on the issue dated April 14, 2018, becoming his eighth top ten entry. As of March 2020, the song has been certified 3× platinum in the United States.

Additionally, it also reached the top ten in Australia, Czech Republic, Denmark, Germany, Ireland, Lebanon, New Zealand, Norway, Portugal, United Kingdom and Sweden, top twenty, Austria, Finland, Hungary and The Netherlands, top thirty in Belgium (Wallonia), Mexico and Scotland and top forty in the Flemish region of Belgium, France and Italy. The song was certified diamond in Brazil, France and Greece, and multi-platinum in Australia, Canada, New Zealand, Poland and Portugal.

== Music videos ==
On the extended play's release day, The Weeknd uploaded a vertical video to Spotify. A lyric video was released three days later on April 2, 2018, depicting the Weeknd on various television screens. The official music video for "Call Out My Name" was released on April 12, 2018, and directed by Grant Singer. As of August 2024, the video has reached 971 million views on YouTube.

== Charts ==
=== Weekly charts ===
Chart (2018–2022)	Peak position
Australia (ARIA)	3
Austria (Ö3 Austria Top 40)	11
Belgium (Ultratop 50 Flanders)	31
Belgium (Ultratop 50 Wallonia)	23
Canada Hot 100 (Billboard)	1
Canada CHR/Top 40 (Billboard)	17
CIS Airplay (TopHit)	63
Czech Republic Singles Digital (ČNS IFPI)	3
Denmark (Tracklisten)	3
Finland (Suomen virallinen lista)	12
France (SNEP)	31
Germany (GfK)	7
Global 200 (Billboard)	97
Greece International (IFPI)	1
Hungary (Single Top 40)	15
Hungary (Stream Top 40)	2
Ireland (IRMA)	5
Italy (FIMI)	40
Lebanon (Lebanese Top 20)	6
Malaysia (RIM)	1
Mexico Airplay (Billboard)	21
Netherlands (Dutch Top 40)	30
Netherlands (Single Top 100)	14
New Zealand (Recorded Music NZ)	7
Norway (VG-lista)	3
Portugal (AFP)	2
Romania (Airplay 100)	5
Russia Airplay (TopHit)	84
Scottish Singles Sales (Official Charts)	27
Singapore (RIAS)	10
Slovakia Airplay (ČNS IFPI)	41
Slovakia Singles Digital (ČNS IFPI)	1
Spain (PROMUSICAE)	57
Sweden (Sverigetopplistan)	6
Switzerland (Schweizer Hitparade)	8
UK Singles (Official Charts)	7
UK Hip Hop/R&B (Official Charts)	3
US Billboard Hot 100	4
US Hot R&B/Hip-Hop Songs (Billboard)	3
US Rhythmic Airplay (Billboard)	14

2023 weekly chart performance for "Call Out My Name"
Chart (2023)	Peak position
Romania Airplay (TopHit)	113

2025 weekly chart performance for "Call Out My Name"
Chart (2025)	Peak position
Romania Airplay (TopHit)	98

=== Year-end charts ===
Chart (2018)	Position
Australia (ARIA)	61
Belgium (Ultratop Wallonia)	82
Canada (Canadian Hot 100)	44
Romania (Airplay 100)	26
US Billboard Hot 100	78
US Top R&B/Hip-Hop Songs (Billboard)	43

== Certifications ==
Region	Certification	Certified units/sales
Australia (ARIA)	6× Platinum	420,000^{‡}
Austria (IFPI Austria)	Platinum	30,000^{‡}
Brazil (Pro-Música Brasil)	3× Diamond	480,000^{‡}
Canada (Music Canada)	3× Platinum	240,000^{‡}
Denmark (IFPI Danmark)	Platinum	90,000^{‡}
France (SNEP)	Diamond	333,333^{‡}
Germany (BVMI)	Gold	200,000^{‡}
Italy (FIMI)	Platinum	100,000^{‡}
New Zealand (RMNZ)	4× Platinum	120,000^{‡}
Poland (ZPAV)	2× Platinum	100,000^{‡}
Portugal (AFP)	5× Platinum	125,000^{‡}
Spain (Promusicae)	Platinum	60,000^{‡}
United Kingdom (BPI)	2× Platinum	1,200,000^{‡}
United States (RIAA)	3× Platinum	3,000,000^{‡}
Streaming
Greece (IFPI Greece)	Diamond	10,000,000^{†}
Sweden (GLF)	Gold	4,000,000^{†}
^{‡} Sales+streaming figures based on certification alone.^{†} Streaming-only figures based on certification alone.

== Release history ==
Region	Date	Format	Label(s)	Ref.
United States	April 10, 2018	Rhythmic contemporary radio	XO; Republic	
Italy	April 20, 2018	Radio airplay	Universal	

== See also ==
- List of number-one songs of 2018 (Malaysia)
