= The Weeknd discography =

Recordings by Canadian singer and songwriter

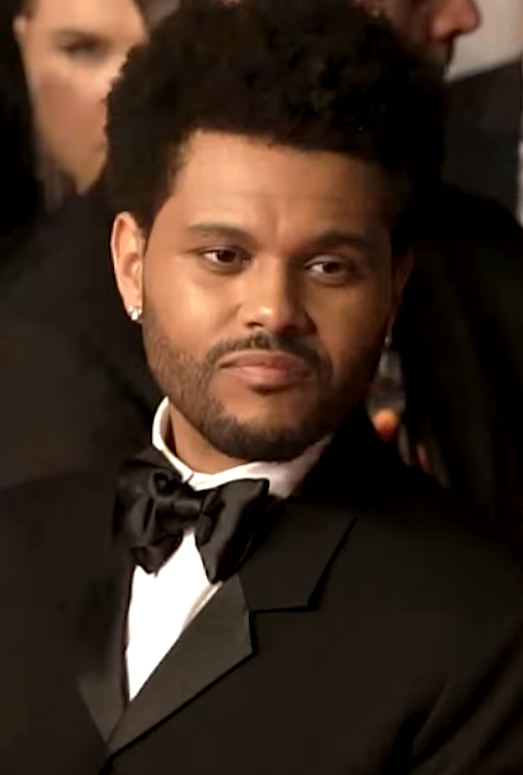
- The Weeknd at the 2023 Cannes Film Festival
- Studio albums: 6
- Extended plays: 1
- Mixtapes: 3
- Soundtrack albums: 2
- Live albums: 1
- Compilation albums: 3
- Remix albums: 1
- Singles: 82
- Promotional singles: 7
- Promotional live albums: 1

The discography of Canadian singer and songwriter The Weeknd consists of six studio albums, one extended play (EP), three mixtapes, two soundtrack albums, one live album, one promotional live album, three compilation albums, (including two greatest hits albums), one remix album, 82 single releases (including 21 as a featured artist) and seven promotional singles (including two as a featured artist). According to the Recording Industry Association of America (RIAA), as of November 2026, the Weeknd has accumulated 132 million certified digital single units and 20.5 million certified album units in the US, based on sales and on-demand streaming. His combined total of 152.5 million certified units ranks him as the 20th best-selling artist of all time in the United States.

The Weeknd released three mixtapes in 2011: House of Balloons, Thursday and Echoes of Silence, the first of which was certified silver in the UK. He signed with Republic Records in 2012, and released Trilogy, a compilation album of the three mixtapes he had released the previous year plus three new bonus tracks. Trilogy peaked within the top five on albums charts and was certified multi-platinum in Canada and the US. The album spawned three singles, all of which were certified platinum or more in the US: "Wicked Games", "Twenty Eight", and "The Zone" (featuring Drake). His debut studio album, Kiss Land, reached number two on the albums charts of Canada and the US. In 2014, the Weeknd released a collaboration with Ariana Grande titled "Love Me Harder" and the single "Earned It", in which the latter was recorded for the Fifty Shades of Grey soundtrack, with both singles becoming top-ten entries on both the singles charts of Canada and the US.

The Weeknd's second studio album, Beauty Behind the Madness, was released in 2015 and reached number one of the albums charts of Australia, Canada, Sweden, the UK, and the US respectively. Supported by the US Billboard Hot 100 number-one singles "The Hills" and "Can't Feel My Face", the album has sold over one million copies in the US and 3.6 million copies worldwide as of 2017. "The Hills" has been certified 11× Platinum in the US. The Weeknd also found success with his features on the singles "Might Not" by Belly in 2015 and "Low Life" by Future in 2016, as well as Beyoncé's 2016 song, "6 Inch".

The Weeknd released his third studio album, Starboy, on November 25, 2016. The album peaked atop the charts in Australia, Canada, Denmark, New Zealand, and the US. It was supported by the international top-ten singles "Starboy", "I Feel It Coming", and "Die for You", the former two of which feature the duo Daft Punk and peaked atop the singles chart and has received diamond certifications in France. The former and latter singles both reached number one in the US and all three singles also received multi-platinum certifications in Australia, Canada, Sweden, and the US, with the album's other singles also obtaining moderate success. In 2017, the Weeknd found success with his features on the singles "Some Way" by Nav, "Lust for Life" by Lana Del Rey, and "A Lie" by French Montana, the latter of which also features Max B. In 2018, he released a collaboration with Kendrick Lamar titled "Pray for Me" for the Black Panther soundtrack, with the song receiving multi-platinum certifications in Canada and the US. Later that year, he released his debut extended play My Dear Melancholy, which spawned the Canada number-one single "Call Out My Name". In 2019, the Weeknd found success with his features on the singles "Price on My Head" by Nav and "Wake Up" by Travis Scott.

On March 20, 2020, the Weeknd released his fourth studio album, After Hours. The hit single, "Blinding Lights", reached the top in Canada and the US and broke the record for the most weeks in the top five (43), top ten (57), and top 100 (90) of the Billboard Hot 100 at the time of its release, and finished 2020 as the year's top Billboard Hot 100 song. The song was later ranked as the No. 1 Greatest Hot 100 Hit of All Time by Billboard. After Hours peaked atop the albums charts of multiple countries including Australia, Canada, the Netherlands, Sweden, the UK, and the US, and also spawned the US number-one and Canada top-ten singles "Heartless" and "Save Your Tears". Later that year, the Weeknd found success with his collaboration with Ariana Grande on the song "Off the Table". In 2021, he released a collaboration with Post Malone titled "One Right Now", which debuted and peaked at number six on the Billboard Hot 100.

On January 7, 2022, the Weeknd released his fifth studio album, Dawn FM. The lead single, "Take My Breath", which was released on August 6, 2021, debuted and peaked at number six of the Billboard Hot 100 in the US. Other singles, achieving moderate success of their own from the album include "Sacrifice", "Out of Time". Later in the year, The Weeknd released a collaboration with Metro Boomin and 21 Savage titled "Creepin'", which debuted and peaked at number one in his home country of Canada and reached number three on the Hot 100. In 2023, he released a collaboration with Travis Scott and Bad Bunny titled "K-pop", which debuted and peaked at number seven on the Hot 100. Very shortly after, he also found success with his feature alongside Swae Lee on the song "Circus Maximus" by Travis Scott. In 2024, he released a collaboration with Future and Metro Boomin titled "Young Metro", which debuted and peaked at number nine on the Hot 100. Very shortly that same year, he released another collaboration with the two artists titled "We Still Don't Trust You", which debuted and peaked at number 22 on the Hot 100.

On January 31, 2025, the Weeknd released his sixth studio album, Hurry Up Tomorrow. It was supported by three singles: "Timeless", "São Paulo", and "Cry for Me". The Weeknd has hinted that this may be his final album under the name, as he plans to "kill" the alter ego. Moving forward, he intends to continue his musical career—perhaps under his real name, Abel Tesfaye, or possibly still as the Weeknd.

== Albums ==
=== Studio albums ===
List of studio albums, with selected chart positions and sales figures
Title	Album details	Peak chart positions										Sales	Certifications
Title	Album details	CAN	AUS	DEN	FRA	GER	NOR	NZ	SWE	UK	US	Sales	Certifications
Kiss Land	Released: September 10, 2013; Label: XO, Republic; Formats: CD, LP, digital download, streaming	2	30	6	93	93	25	—	60	12	2	US: 95,000	MC: Platinum; BPI: Gold; IFPI DEN: Gold; RIAA: Gold
Beauty Behind the Madness	Released: August 28, 2015; Label: XO, Republic; Formats: CD, LP, digital download, streaming, cassette	1	1	2	6	7	1	2	1	1	1	UK: 786,366 (Note: United Kingdom sales figures for Behind the Madness as of February 2025.); US: 1,230,000 (Note: US sales figure for Beauty Behind the Madness as of August 2017)	MC: 7× Platinum; ARIA: 2× Platinum; BPI: 2× Platinum; BVMI: Gold; IFPI DEN: 5× Platinum; IFPI NOR: Gold; IFPI SWE: Platinum; RIAA: 6× Platinum; RMNZ: 3× Platinum
Starboy	Released: November 25, 2016; Label: XO, Republic; Formats: CD, LP, digital download, streaming, cassette	1	1	1	14	10	1	5	1	5	1	UK: 801,973 (Note: United Kingdom sales figures for Starboy as of February 2025.); US: 484,000 (Note: US sales figure for Starboy as of December 2017)	MC: 7× Platinum; ARIA: 3× Platinum; BPI: 3× Platinum; BVMI: Platinum; IFPI DEN: 8× Platinum; IFPI NOR: Platinum; IFPI SWE: 2× Platinum; RIAA: 6× Platinum; RMNZ: 6× Platinum; SNEP: 3× Platinum
After Hours	Released: March 20, 2020; Label: XO, Republic; Formats: CD, LP, digital download, streaming, cassette	1	1	1	2	5	1	1	1	1	1	CAN: 54,000; UK: 439,014 (Note: United Kingdom sales figures for After Hours as of February 2025.); US: 586,000 (Note: US sales figure for After Hours as of January 2022)	MC: 5× Platinum; ARIA: Platinum; BPI: Platinum; BVMI: Platinum; IFPI DEN: 7× Platinum; IFPI NOR: 2× Platinum; IFPI SWE: 2× Platinum; RIAA: 3× Platinum; RMNZ: 2× Platinum; SNEP: Diamond
Dawn FM	Released: January 7, 2022; Label: XO, Republic; Formats: CD, LP, digital download, streaming, cassette	1	1	2	3	5	1	1	1	1	2	US: 195,000 (Note: In 2022 the album sold 195,000 pure copies)	MC: 3× Platinum; ARIA: Gold; BPI: Platinum; IFPI DEN: Platinum; IFPI NOR: Gold; RIAA: Platinum; RMNZ: Platinum; SNEP: Platinum
Hurry Up Tomorrow	Released: January 31, 2025; Label: XO, Republic; Formats: CD, LP, digital download, streaming, cassette	1	1	1	1	1	1	1	3	1	1	US: 359,000	MC: 2× Platinum; BPI: Gold; BVMI: Gold; IFPI DEN: Platinum; RMNZ: Gold; SNEP: Platinum
"—" denotes a recording that did not chart or was not released in that territory.

=== Soundtrack albums ===
List of soundtrack albums, with selected chart positions
Title	Album details	Peak chart positions
Title	Album details	AUS
The Idol, Vol. 1 (Note: The music for the television series The Idol was initially planned to be released as a soundtrack album entitled The Idol, Vol. 1 on June 30, 2023, but was instead released in six individual extended plays released following every episode: The Idol Episode 1 (Music from the HBO Original Series) (with Mike Dean and Lily-Rose Depp) — released June 9, 2023; The Idol Episode 2 (Music from the HBO Original Series) (with Mike Dean and Suzanna Son) — released June 12, 2023; The Idol Episode 3 (Music from the HBO Original Series) (with Moses Sumney) — released June 19, 2023; The Idol Episode 4 (Music from the HBO Original Series) (with Jennie and Lily-Rose Depp) — released June 23, 2023; The Idol Episode 5 Part 1 (Music from the HBO Original Series) (with Lil Baby and Suzanna Son) — released June 30, 2023; The Idol Episode 5 Part 2 (Music from the HBO Original Series) (with Lily-Rose Depp and Suzanna Son) — released July 3, 2023, The intended second single of the soundtrack "Popular" (with Playboi Carti and Madonna; released June 2, 2023) would remain a standalone single release. It and the extended plays were considered as one combined soundtrack album on record charts.)	Released: June 9 – July 3, 2023; Label: XO, Republic; Formats: Digital download, streaming	73
Hurry Up Tomorrow (Original Motion Picture Score)	Released: July 11, 2025; Label: XO, Republic; Formats: LP, CD	—

=== Remix albums ===
List of remix albums, with selected details
Title	Album details
After Hours (Remixes)	Released: April 3, 2020; Label: XO, Republic; Formats: LP, digital download, streaming

=== Live albums ===
List of live albums, with selected chart positions
Title	Album details	Peak chart positions
Title	Album details	US
Live at SoFi Stadium	Released: March 3, 2023; Label: XO, Republic; Formats: digital download, streaming	172

=== Promotional live albums ===
List of promotional live albums, with selected details
Title	Album details
The Dawn FM Experience	Released: February 26, 2022; Label: XO, Republic; Formats: digital download, streaming

=== Mixtapes ===
List of mixtapes, with selected details, chart positions and certifications
Title	Album details	Peak chart positions	
Title	Album details	BEL (WA)	US
House of Balloons	Released: March 21, 2011; Label: XO; Format: digital download, CD, LP, streaming, cassette	40	113
Thursday	Released: August 18, 2011; Label: XO; Format: digital download, CD, LP, streaming, cassette	—	— (Note: Thursday did not enter the Billboard 200, but peaked at number 15 on the Top Album Sales chart.)
Echoes of Silence	Released: December 21, 2011; Label: XO; Format: digital download, CD, LP, streaming, cassette	—	— (Note: Echoes of Silence did not enter the Billboard 200, but peaked at number 18 on the Top Album Sales chart.)
"—" denotes a recording that did not chart or was not released in that territory.

=== Compilation albums ===
List of compilation albums, with selected chart positions, sales figures and certifications
Title	Album details	Peak chart positions										Sales	Certifications
Title	Album details	CAN	AUS	DEN	FRA	GER	JPN	NLD	NZ	UK	US	Sales	Certifications
Trilogy	Released: November 8, 2012; Label: XO, Republic; Formats: CD, LP, digital download, streaming	5	93	22	128	90	—	48	—	37	4	US: 558,000 (Note: Worldwide sales figure for Trilogy as of August 2015)	MC: 3× Platinum; ARIA: Gold; BPI: Platinum; IFPI DEN: Platinum; RIAA: 3× Platinum; RMNZ: Platinum
The Weeknd in Japan	Released: November 21, 2018 (JPN only); Label: XO, Republic, Universal Music Japan; Formats: CD, digital download, streaming	—	—	—	—	—	157	—	—	—	—		
The Highlights	Released: February 5, 2021; Label: XO, Republic; Formats: CD, LP, cassette, digital download, streaming	1	2	27	4	13	83	29	1	2	2		MC: 3× Platinum; ARIA: 3× Platinum; BPI: 6× Platinum; IFPI DEN: Gold; RMNZ: 8× Platinum; SNEP: 3× Platinum
"—" denotes a recording that did not chart or was not released in that territory.

== Extended plays ==
List of extended plays, with selected details
Title	EP details	Peak chart positions										Sales	Certifications
Title	EP details	CAN	AUS	DEN	FRA	GER	NLD	NZ	SWE	UK	US	Sales	Certifications
My Dear Melancholy	Released: March 30, 2018; Label: XO, Republic; Formats: CD, LP, digital download, streaming	1	3	1	17	7	3	2	1	3	1	US: 117,000 (Note: US sales figure for My Dear Melancholy as of July 2018)	MC: Platinum; ARIA: Gold; BPI: Gold; IFPI DEN: Platinum; RIAA: Platinum; RMNZ: Platinum
"—" denotes a recording that did not chart or was not released in that territory.

== Singles ==
=== As lead artist ===
==== 2010s ====
List of singles as lead artist, with selected chart positions and certifications, showing year released and album name
Title	Year	Peak chart positions										Certifications	Album
Title	Year	CAN	AUS	DEN	FRA	GER	NLD	NZ	SWE	UK	US	Certifications	Album
"Wicked Games"	2012	43	—	—	—	—	—	—	19	152	53	MC: 2× Platinum; ARIA: 2× Platinum; BPI: Platinum; IFPI DEN: Gold; RIAA: 3× Platinum; RMNZ: Platinum	Trilogy
"Twenty Eight"	2012	—	—	—	—	—	—	—	—	150	— (Note: "Twenty Eight" did not enter the Billboard Hot 100 or the Hot R&B/Hip-Hop Songs chart, but peaked at number 49 on the R&B/Hip-hop Digital Song Sales chart.)	RIAA: Platinum	Trilogy
"The Zone" (featuring Drake)	2012	—	—	—	—	—	—	—	—	—	— (Note: "The Zone" did not enter the Billboard Hot 100 or the Hot R&B/Hip-Hop Songs chart, but peaked at number 50 on the R&B/Hip-Hop Digital Song Sales chart.)	ARIA: Gold; RIAA: Platinum	Trilogy
"Kiss Land"	2013	—	—	—	—	—	—	—	—	—	—		Kiss Land
"Belong to the World"	2013	—	—	—	—	—	—	—	—	—	— (Note: "Belong to the World" did not enter the Billboard Hot 100 or the Hot R&B/Hip-Hop Songs chart, but peaked at number 7 on the Bubbling Under R&B/Hip-Hop Singles chart and at number 22 on the Hot R&B Songs chart.)		Kiss Land
"Love in the Sky"	2013	—	—	—	—	—	—	—	—	—	—		Kiss Land
"Live For" (featuring Drake)	2013	—	—	—	—	—	—	—	—	111	— (Note: "Live For" did not enter the Billboard Hot 100, but peaked at number 19 on the Bubbling Under Hot 100 Singles chart.)		Kiss Land
"Pretty"	2013	—	—	—	—	—	—	—	—	—	—		Kiss Land
"Wanderlust"	2014	45	—	—	—	—	—	—	—	—	—	MC: Gold	Kiss Land
"Often"	2014	69	—	—	—	—	65	—	55	65	59	MC: 3× Platinum; ARIA: 4× Platinum; BPI: 2× Platinum; BVMI: Gold; IFPI DEN: 2× Platinum; IFPI SWE: Platinum; RIAA: 4× Platinum; RMNZ: 3× Platinum	Beauty Behind the Madness
"Love Me Harder" (with Ariana Grande)	2014	10	19	18	27	35	12	28	26	48	7	MC: 3× Platinum; ARIA: 6× Platinum; BPI: Platinum; BVMI: Gold; IFPI DEN: Platinum; IFPI SWE: 2× Platinum; RIAA: 5× Platinum; RMNZ: 3× Platinum	My Everything
"Earned It"	2014	8	13	2	2	17	8	7	7	4	3	MC: 6× Platinum; ARIA: 6× Platinum; BPI: 3× Platinum; BVMI: Platinum; IFPI DEN: 3× Platinum; IFPI SWE: 3× Platinum; RIAA: Diamond; RMNZ: 5× Platinum; SNEP: Gold	Fifty Shades of Grey: Original Motion Picture Soundtrack and Beauty Behind the Madness
"The Hills"	2015	1	3	11	11	10	29	2	12	3	1	MC: Diamond; ARIA: 12× Platinum; BPI: 5× Platinum; BVMI: 3× Gold; IFPI DEN: 2× Platinum; IFPI SWE: 3× Platinum; RIAA: Diamond (11× Platinum); RMNZ: 8× Platinum	Beauty Behind the Madness
"Can't Feel My Face"	2015	1	2	1	5	14	3	1	6	3	1	MC: Diamond; ARIA: 11× Platinum; BPI: 4× Platinum; BVMI: Platinum; IFPI DEN: 4× Platinum; IFPI SWE: 6× Platinum; RIAA: Diamond; RMNZ: 6× Platinum; SNEP: Gold	Beauty Behind the Madness
"In the Night"	2015	12	13	26	124	72	22	22	40	48	12	MC: 2× Platinum; ARIA: Platinum; BPI: Gold; IFPI DEN: Platinum; IFPI SWE: Platinum; RIAA: 3× Platinum; RMNZ: Platinum	Beauty Behind the Madness
"Acquainted"	2015	73	96	45	17	6	7	45	53	90	60	MC: 4× Platinum; ARIA: Platinum; BPI: Gold; IFPI DEN: Gold; RIAA: 4× Platinum; RMNZ: Platinum	Beauty Behind the Madness
"Starboy" (featuring Daft Punk)	2016	1	2	1	1	3	1	1	1	2	1	MC: Diamond; ARIA: 15× Platinum; BPI: 6× Platinum; BVMI: 2× Platinum; IFPI DEN: 4× Platinum; IFPI SWE: 4× Platinum; RIAA: Diamond (15× Platinum); RMNZ: 9× Platinum; SNEP: Diamond	Starboy
"False Alarm"	2016	33	72	—	98	—	79	— (Note: "False Alarm" did not enter the NZ Top 40 Singles Chart, but peaked at number one on the NZ Heatseekers Singles Chart.)	89	51	55	MC: Platinum; ARIA: Platinum; BPI: Silver; RIAA: Platinum; RMNZ: Gold	Starboy
"I Feel It Coming" (featuring Daft Punk)	2016	10	4	7	1	29	4	7	5	9	4	MC: Diamond; ARIA: 8× Platinum; BPI: 3× Platinum; BVMI: Platinum; IFPI DEN: 4× Platinum; IFPI SWE: 3× Platinum; RIAA: 8× Platinum; RMNZ: 6× Platinum; SNEP: Diamond	Starboy
"Party Monster"	2016	8	33	16	88	34	27	27	26	17	16	MC: 4× Platinum; ARIA: 2× Platinum; BPI: Platinum; IFPI DEN: Platinum; RIAA: 3× Platinum; RMNZ: 2× Platinum; SNEP: Platinum	Starboy
"Reminder"	2017	16	—	—	74	93	60	— (Note: "Reminder" did not enter the NZ Top 40 Singles Chart, but peaked at number two on the NZ Heatseeker Singles Chart.)	76	39	31	MC: 3× Platinum; BPI: Platinum; BVMI: Gold; IFPI DEN: Gold; RIAA: 3× Platinum; RMNZ: 2× Platinum; SNEP: Platinum	Starboy
"Rockin'"	2017	25	—	—	176	60	25	— (Note: "Rockin'" did not enter the NZ Top 40 Singles Chart, but peaked at number one on the NZ Heatseeker Singles Chart.)	12	26	44	MC: Platinum; BPI: Silver; RMNZ: Gold	Starboy
"Die for You" (solo or remix with Ariana Grande)	2017	2	3	3	20	10	5	2	13	3	1	MC: 8× Platinum; ARIA: 8× Platinum; BPI: 3× Platinum; BVMI: Gold; IFPI DEN: 2× Platinum; RIAA: Diamond; RMNZ: 7× Platinum; SNEP: Diamond	Starboy
"Secrets"	2017	27	—	—	114	—	55	—	77	47	47	MC: Platinum; BPI: Silver; RIAA: Platinum; RMNZ: Gold; SNEP: Gold	Starboy
"Pray for Me" (with Kendrick Lamar)	2018	5	9	6	14	24	22	12	4	11	7	MC: 3× Platinum; ARIA: 4× Platinum; BPI: Platinum; BVMI: Gold; IFPI DEN: Platinum; IFPI SWE: Platinum; RIAA: 2× Platinum; RMNZ: 2× Platinum; SNEP: Diamond	Black Panther: The Album
"Call Out My Name"	2018	1	3	3	22	7	14	7	6	7	4	MC: 3× Platinum; ARIA: 6× Platinum; BPI: 2× Platinum; BVMI: Gold; IFPI DEN: Platinum; IFPI SWE: Gold; RIAA: 3× Platinum; RMNZ: 4× Platinum; SNEP: Diamond	My Dear Melancholy
"Lost in the Fire" (with Gesaffelstein)	2019	14	24	17	78	49	60	— (Note: "Lost in the Fire" did not enter the NZ Top 40 Singles Chart, but peaked at number two on the NZ Hot Singles Chart.)	9	9	27	MC: 4× Platinum; ARIA: 3× Platinum; BPI: Platinum; BVMI: Gold; IFPI DEN: Gold; IFPI SWE: Gold; RIAA: 2× Platinum; RMNZ: 2× Platinum; SNEP: Diamond	Hyperion
"Power Is Power" (with SZA and Travis Scott)	2019	50	30	—	—	—	—	— (Note: "Power Is Power" did not enter the NZ Top 40 Singles Chart, but peaked at number three on the NZ Hot Singles Chart.)	41	45	90	RIAA: Gold	For the Throne: Music Inspired by the HBO Series Game of Thrones
"Heartless"	2019	3	10	—	69	36	30	13	27	10	1	MC: 3× Platinum; ARIA: 3× Platinum; BPI: Platinum; IFPI DEN: Platinum; IFPI SWE: Platinum; RIAA: 3× Platinum; RMNZ: 2× Platinum; SNEP: Gold	After Hours
"Blinding Lights"	2019	1	1	1	1	1	1	1	1	1	1	MC: Diamond; ARIA: 22× Platinum; BPI: 8× Platinum; BVMI: 7× Gold; IFPI DEN: 7× Platinum; IFPI SWE: 11× Platinum; RIAA: Diamond; RMNZ: 10× Platinum; SNEP: Diamond	After Hours
"—" denotes a recording that did not chart or was not released in that territory.

==== 2020s ====
List of singles as lead artist, with selected chart positions and certifications, showing year released and album name
Title	Year	Peak chart positions										Certifications	Album
Title	Year	CAN	AUS	DEN	FRA	GER	NLD	NZ	SWE	UK	US	Certifications	Album
"After Hours"	2020	14	11	17	44	35	27	29	10	20	20	ARIA: 2× Platinum; BPI: Platinum; IFPI DEN: Platinum; RIAA: Platinum; RMNZ: Platinum; SNEP: Platinum	After Hours
"In Your Eyes"	2020	13	13	5	31	68	20	24	7	17	16	MC: 2× Platinum; ARIA: 3× Platinum; BPI: Platinum; BVMI: Gold; IFPI DEN: 2× Platinum; IFPI SWE: 3× Platinum; RIAA: Platinum; RMNZ: 2× Platinum; SNEP: Diamond	After Hours
"Smile" (with Juice Wrld)	2020	7	8	24	152	57	47	12	17	23	8	BPI: Silver; RIAA: Platinum; RMNZ: Platinum	Legends Never Die
"Save Your Tears" (solo or remix with Ariana Grande)	2020	1	3	1	6	5	15	9	3	2	1	MC: Diamond; ARIA: 16× Platinum; BPI: 5× Platinum; BVMI: 2× Platinum; IFPI DEN: 5× Platinum; IFPI SWE: 6× Platinum; RIAA: Diamond; RMNZ: 8× Platinum; SNEP: Diamond	After Hours
"Over Now" (with Calvin Harris)	2020	22	17	31	124	92	83	38	15	33	38	ARIA: Gold; BPI: Silver	Non-album singles
"Hawái" (Remix) (with Maluma)	2020	21	—	—	86	62	17	— (Note: "Hawái" did not enter the NZ Top 40 Singles Chart, but peaked at number eight on the NZ Hot Singles Chart.)	28	84	12	RIAA: 22× Platinum (Latin)	Non-album singles
"You Right" (with Doja Cat)	2021	10	11	—	120	54	59	6	53	9	11	MC: 5× Platinum; ARIA: 2× Platinum; BPI: Platinum; IFPI SWE: Gold; RIAA: 2× Platinum; RMNZ: 2× Platinum; SNEP: Gold	Planet Her
"Better Believe" (with Belly and Young Thug)	2021	23	—	—	—	—	—	— (Note: "Better Believe" did not enter the NZ Top 40 Singles Chart, but peaked at number 15 on the NZ Hot Singles Chart.)	— (Note: "Better Believe" did not enter the Swedish Singellista Chart, but peaked at number seven on the Swedish Heatseekers Chart.)	—	88		See You Next Wednesday
"Take My Breath"	2021	3	9	7	17	18	17	12	8	13	6	MC: 4× Platinum; ARIA: 2× Platinum; BPI: Platinum; BVMI: Gold; IFPI DEN: Platinum; IFPI SWE: Platinum; RIAA: Platinum; RMNZ: Platinum; SNEP: Diamond	Dawn FM
"Die for It" (with Belly featuring Nas)	2021	65	—	—	—	—	—	—	—	—	— (Note: "Die for It" did not enter the Billboard Hot 100, but peaked at number 21 on the Bubbling Under Hot 100.)		See You Next Wednesday
"Hurricane" (with Kanye West featuring Lil Baby)	2021	4	4	5	41	37	28	3	8	7	6	MC: Platinum; BPI: Silver; IFPI DEN: Gold; RIAA: 2× Platinum; RMNZ: Platinum	Donda
"Moth to a Flame" (with Swedish House Mafia)	2021	7	8	10	34	14	19	13	5	15	27	MC: 3× Platinum; ARIA: Platinum; BPI: Platinum; BVMI: Gold; IFPI DEN: Gold; NVPI: Platinum; RIAA: Platinum; RMNZ: 2× Platinum; SNEP: Diamond	Paradise Again and Dawn FM (Alternate World)
"One Right Now" (with Post Malone)	2021	7	9	12	133	45	35	19	10	20	6	MC: 3× Platinum; ARIA: 3× Platinum; BPI: Gold; IFPI DEN: Gold; IFPI SWE: Platinum; RMNZ: Platinum; SNEP: Gold	Twelve Carat Toothache
"Sacrifice"	2022	9	9	12	21	27	15	22	5	10	11	MC: 2× Platinum; ARIA: Platinum; BPI: Goldr; IFPI DEN: Gold; IFPI SWE: Gold; RMNZ: Gold; SNEP: Diamond	Dawn FM
"Out of Time"	2022	20	29	32	55	—	86	— (Note: "Out of Time" did not enter the NZ Top 40 Singles Chart, but peaked at number five on the NZ Hot Singles Chart.)	46	— (Note: "Out of Time" did not enter the UK Singles Chart, as chart rules only allow three songs per artist to chart within the top one hundred at a time, but peaked at number 42 on the Official UK Streaming chart.)	32	ARIA: Platinum; BPI: Silver; RIAA: Platinum; RMNZ: Gold; SNEP: Gold	Dawn FM
"Less than Zero"	2022	32	47	33	82	—	—	—	67	— (Note: "Less than Zero" did not enter the UK Singles Chart, as chart rules only allow three songs per artist to chart within the top one hundred at a time, but peaked at number 57 on the Official UK Streaming chart.)	53	MC: Platinum; ARIA: Gold; BPI: Silver; RMNZ: Gold; SNEP: Gold	Dawn FM
"Creepin'" (with Metro Boomin and 21 Savage)	2022	1	7	3	8	10	8	6	8	7	3	MC: 3× Platinum; ARIA: 4× Platinum; BPI: Platinum; BVMI: Gold; IFPI DEN: Platinum; RIAA: 4× Platinum; RMNZ: 3× Platinum; SNEP: Diamond	Heroes & Villains
"Nothing Is Lost (You Give Me Strength)"	2022	88	—	—	140	—	—	— (Note: "Nothing Is Lost (You Give Me Strength)" did not enter the NZ Top 40 Singles Chart, but peaked at number five on the NZ Hot Singles Chart.)	—	— (Note: "Nothing Is Lost (You Give Me Strength)" did not enter the UK Singles Chart, but peaked at number 79 on the Official UK Single Downloads chart.)	— (Note: "Nothing Is Lost (You Give Me Strength)" did not enter the Billboard Hot 100, but peaked at number 23 on the Bubbling Under Hot 100.)		Avatar: The Way of Water (Original Motion Picture Soundtrack)
"Double Fantasy" (featuring Future)	2023	7	9	18	34	23	38	11	18	14	18	MC: Platinum; ARIA: Gold; RMNZ: Gold	The Idol Episode 2 (Music from the HBO Original Series)
"Popular" (with Playboi Carti and Madonna)	2023	10	8	17	77	21	23	6	27	10	43	MC: 5× Platinum; ARIA: 3× Platinum; BPI: Platinum; BVMI: Gold; IFPI DEN: Platinum; RIAA: Platinum; RMNZ: 3× Platinum; SNEP: Platinum	The Highlights (Deluxe)
"K-pop" (with Travis Scott and Bad Bunny)	2023	14	22	25	20	22	49	27	27	24	7	MC: Platinum; RIAA: Platinum	Utopia
"Another One of Me" (with Diddy and French Montana featuring 21 Savage)	2023	83	—	—	—	—	—	— (Note: "Another One of Me" did not enter the NZ Top 40 Singles Chart, but peaked at number 11 on the NZ Hot Singles Chart.)	—	98	87		The Love Album: Off the Grid
"One of the Girls" (with Jennie and Lily-Rose Depp)	2023	29	30	—	110	53	66	28	26	21	51	ARIA: Gold; BPI: Platinum; BVMI: Gold; IFPI DEN: Platinum; RIAA: Platinum; RMNZ: 3× Platinum; SNEP: Diamond	The Idol Episode 4 (Music from the HBO Original Series)
"Young Metro" (with Future and Metro Boomin)	2024	17	68	—	111	—	—	—	— (Note: "Young Metro" did not enter the Swedish Singellista Chart, but peaked at number 13 on the Swedish Heatseeker Chart.)	— (Note: "Young Metro" did not enter the UK Singles Chart, as chart rules only allow three songs per artist to chart within the top one hundred at a time, but peaked at number 47 on the UK Streaming Chart.)	9	MC: Gold	We Don't Trust You
"We Still Don't Trust You" (with Future and Metro Boomin)	2024	21	66	—	119	—	—	— (Note: "We Still Don't Trust You" did not enter the NZ Top 40 Singles Chart, but peaked at number five on the NZ Hot Singles Chart.)	— (Note: "We Still Don't Trust You" did not enter the Swedish Singellista Chart, but peaked at number 12 on the Swedish Heatseeker Chart.)	49	22	MC: Gold	We Still Don't Trust You
"Dancing in the Flames"	2024	15	19	23	31	13	35	32	10	12	14	MC: Gold; BPI: Silver; IFPI DEN: Gold; SNEP: Platinum	Non-album single
"Timeless" (with Playboi Carti)	2024	4	11	10	20	8	24	4	17	7	3	MC: 7× Platinum; ARIA: 4× Platinum; BPI: Platinum; BVMI: Gold; IFPI DEN: Platinum; RMNZ: 2× Platinum; SNEP: Diamond	Hurry Up Tomorrow
"São Paulo" (with Anitta)	2024	22	32	—	18	16	38	— (Note: "São Paulo" did not enter the NZ Top 40 Singles Chart, but peaked at number two on the NZ Hot Singles Chart.)	33	21	43	MC: 3× Platinum; BPI: Silver; IFPI DEN: Gold; RMNZ: Gold; SNEP: Platinum	Hurry Up Tomorrow
"Cry for Me"	2025	8	20	23	15	68	24	35	12	8	12	MC: 2× Platinum; BPI: Silver; SNEP: Platinum	Hurry Up Tomorrow
"Rather Lie" (with Playboi Carti)	2025	9	16	35	59	—	41	7	49	10	4	RIAA: Platinum; RMNZ: Gold	Music
"Hong Kong" (featuring Faye Wong) (Note: Released exclusively in Hong Kong.)	2026	—	—	—	—	—	—	—	—	—	—		Non-album single
"—" denotes a recording that did not chart or was not released in that territory.

=== As featured artist ===
List of singles as featured artist, with selected chart positions and certifications, showing year released and album name
Title	Year	Peak chart positions										Certifications	Album
Title	Year	CAN	AUS	BEL	DEN	NLD	NZ	UK	UK R&B	US	US R&B /HH	Certifications	Album
"Crew Love" (Drake featuring the Weeknd)	2012	80	—	—	—	—	—	37	7	80	9	ARIA: Platinum; BPI: Platinum; RIAA: Platinum; RMNZ: Gold	Take Care
"Remember You" (Wiz Khalifa featuring The Weeknd)	2012	—	—	—	—	—	—	—	31	63	15	RIAA: Platinum	O.N.I.F.C.
"Odd Look" (Kavinsky featuring the Weeknd)	2013	—	—	10	—	—	—	—	—	—	—		Odd Look EP
"Elastic Heart" (Sia featuring the Weeknd and Diplo)	2013	—	67	35	21	46	7	61	—	—	—	IFPI DEN: Gold; RMNZ: 4× Platinum	The Hunger Games: Catching Fire – Original Motion Picture Soundtrack
"Or Nah" (Remix) (Ty Dolla Sign featuring the Weeknd, Wiz Khalifa and DJ Mustard)	2014	—	—	—	—	—	—	—	—	—	—	RIAA: Diamond	Non-album singles
"Drinks on Us" (Mike Will Made It featuring the Weeknd, Swae Lee, and Future)	2015	—	—	—	—	—	—	—	—	—	— (Note: "Drinks On Us" did not enter the Hot R&B/Hip-Hop Songs chart, but peaked at number five on the Bubbling Under R&B/Hip-Hop Singles chart.)	RIAA: Gold	Non-album singles
"Sexodus" (M.I.A. featuring the Weeknd)	2015	—	—	—	—	—	—	—	—	—	—		Matangi
"Might Not" (Belly featuring the Weeknd)	2015	28	—	—	—	—	—	—	—	68	21	MC: 2× Platinum; RIAA: Platinum	Up For Days
"Wonderful" (Travis Scott featuring the Weeknd)	2016	—	—	—	—	—	—	—	—	—	—	MC: Platinum; ARIA: Gold; RIAA: Platinum	Birds in the Trap Sing McKnight
"Nocturnal" (Disclosure featuring the Weeknd)	2016	—	—	—	—	—	—	—	—	—	—		Caracal
"Low Life" (Future featuring the Weeknd)	2016	25	96	—	—	91	30	—	26	18	6	MC: Platinum; ARIA: Gold; BPI: Platinum; IFPI DEN: Platinum; RIAA: 13× Platinum; RMNZ: 2× Platinum	Evol
"Wild Love" (Cashmere Cat featuring the Weeknd and Francis and the Lights)	2016	—	—	—	—	—	—	—	—	—	—		9
"Some Way" (Nav featuring the Weeknd)	2017	31	—	—	—	—	—	—	—	— (Note: "Some Way" did not enter the Billboard Hot 100, but peaked at number one on the Bubbling Under Hot 100 Singles chart.)	38	MC: 4× Platinum; BPI: Silver; RIAA: 2× Platinum; RMNZ: Gold	Nav
"Lust for Life" (Lana Del Rey featuring the Weeknd)	2017	39	44	—	—	—	— (Note: "Lust for Life" did not enter the NZ Top 40 Singles Chart, but peaked at number one on the NZ Heatseekers Singles Chart.)	38	—	64	—	ARIA: Platinum; BPI: Gold; RIAA: Platinum; RMNZ: Gold	Lust for Life
"A Lie" (French Montana featuring the Weeknd and Max B)	2017	30	71	—	—	—	—	51	12	75	—		Jungle Rules
"What You Want" (Belly featuring the Weeknd)	2018	47	—	—	—	—	—	—	—	—	—	MC: Gold	Immigrant
"Price on My Head" (Nav featuring the Weeknd)	2019	18	—	—	—	—	— (Note: "Price on My Head" did not enter the NZ Top 40 Singles Chart, but peaked at number 12 on the NZ Hot Singles Chart.)	91	—	72	29	MC: 2× Platinum	Bad Habits
"Wake Up" (Travis Scott featuring the Weeknd)	2019	27	67	—	—	—	28	— (Note: "Wake Up" did not enter the Official UK Singles chart, but peaked at number 64 on the Official UK Streaming chart.)	—	30	21	MC: Platinum; ARIA: Platinum; BPI: Silver; RIAA: 2× Platinum; RMNZ: Platinum	Astroworld
"La Fama" (Rosalía featuring the Weeknd)	2021	86	—	—	—	—	— (Note: "La Fama" did not enter the NZ Top 40 Singles Chart, but peaked at number 30 on the NZ Hot Singles Chart.)	—	—	94	—	MC: Gold; RIAA: Platinum	Motomami
"Tears in the Club" (FKA Twigs featuring the Weeknd)	2021	79	—	—	—	—	— (Note: "Tears in the Club" did not enter the NZ Top 40 Singles Chart, but peaked at number 12 on the NZ Hot Singles Chart.)	—	—	—	—		Caprisongs
"Poison" (Aaliyah featuring the Weeknd)	2021	—	—	—	—	—	— (Note: "Poison" did not enter the NZ Top 40 Singles Chart, but peaked at number 33 on the NZ Hot Singles Chart.)	—	—	—	— (Note: "Poison" did not enter the US R&B Chart, but peaked at number 15 on the US Hot R&B Songs chart.)		Unstoppable
"—" denotes a recording that did not chart or was not released in that territory.

=== Promotional singles ===
Title	Year	Peak chart positions				Certifications	Album
Title	Year	CAN	AUS	UK	US	Certifications	Album
"Rolling Stone"	2011	—	—	—	—		Thursday
"The Birds, Pt. 1"	2011	—	—	—	—		Thursday
"Initiation"	2011	—	—	—	—		Echoes of Silence
"One of Those Nights" (Juicy J featuring the Weeknd)	2013	—	—	—	— (Note: "One of Those Nights" did not enter the Hot R&B/Hip-Hop Songs chart, but peaked at number 6 on the Bubbling Under R&B/Hip-Hop Singles chart.)		Stay Trippy
"King of the Fall"	2014	—	—	—	— (Note: "King of the Fall" did not enter the Billboard Hot 100 or the Hot R&B/Hip-Hop Songs chart, but peaked at number 18 on the Hot R&B Songs chart.)		Non-album promotional single
"Curve" (Gucci Mane featuring the Weeknd)	2017	40	93	78	67	RIAA: Platinum	Mr. Davis
"Blinding Lights" (Remix) (with Rosalía)	2020	—	—	—	—		Non-album promotional single
"—" denotes a recording that did not chart or was not released in that territory.

== Other charted or certified songs ==
List of songs, with selected chart positions and certifications, showing year released and album name
Title	Year	Peak chart positions										Certifications	Album
Title	Year	CAN	AUS	FRA	NLD	NZ	POR	SWE	UK	US	US R&B/HH	Certifications	Album
"High for This"	2011	—	—	97	—	—	—	—	—	—	— (Note: "High for This" did not enter the Hot R&B/Hip-Hop Songs chart, but peaked at number 22 on the Hot R&B Songs chart.)	MC: Platinum; BPI: Silver; RIAA: Platinum; RMNZ: Gold	House of Balloons
"The Morning"	2011	—	—	—	—	—	—	—	—	—	— (Note: "The Morning" did not enter the Hot R&B/Hip-Hop Songs chart, but peaked at number nine on the Bubbling Under R&B/Hip-Hop Singles chart.)	MC: Platinum; BPI: Platinum; RIAA: Platinum; RMNZ: Platinum	House of Balloons
"House of Balloons / Glass Table Girls"	2011	—	—	—	—	—	—	— (Note: "House of Balloons / Glass Table Girls" did not enter the Swedish Singellista Chart, but peaked at number 6 on the Swedish Heatseeker Chart.)	—	—	—	BPI: Platinum; RMNZ: Platinum	House of Balloons
"The Party & the After Party"	2011	—	—	—	—	—	—	—	—	—	—	ARIA: Gold; BPI: Gold; RMNZ: Platinum	House of Balloons
"What You Need"	2011	—	—	—	—	—	—	—	—	—	—	RMNZ: Gold	House of Balloons
"Coming Down"	2011	—	—	—	—	—	—	—	—	—	—	BPI: Silver; RMNZ: Gold	House of Balloons
"In Vein" (Rick Ross featuring the Weeknd)	2014	—	—	—	—	—	—	—	—	—	47		Mastermind
"Where You Belong"	2015	—	—	111	—	—	—	—	64	95	31		Fifty Shades of Grey: Original Motion Picture Soundtrack
"Pullin Up" (Meek Mill featuring the Weeknd)	2015	—	—	—	—	—	—	—	—	— (Note: "Pullin Up" did not enter the Billboard Hot 100, but peaked at number one on the Bubbling Under Hot 100 Singles chart.)	31		Dreams Worth More Than Money
"Real Life"	2015	69	—	—	—	—	—	63	72	62	23	MC: Gold; ARIA: Gold	Beauty Behind the Madness
"Losers" (featuring Labrinth)	2015	88	—	—	—	—	—	72	91	85	31	ARIA: Gold	Beauty Behind the Madness
"Tell Your Friends"	2015	44	—	—	—	—	—	100	74	54	19	MC: Gold; BPI: Silver; RIAA: Platinum; RMNZ: Gold	Beauty Behind the Madness
"Shameless"	2015	100	—	—	—	—	—	—	—	79	27	MC: Gold; BPI: Silver; ARIA: Gold; RIAA: Platinum	Beauty Behind the Madness
"As You Are"	2015	—	—	—	—	—	—	—	—	— (Note: "As You Are" did not enter the Billboard Hot 100, but peaked at number six on the Bubbling Under Hot 100 Singles chart.)	42	MC: Gold	Beauty Behind the Madness
"Dark Times" (featuring Ed Sheeran)	2015	—	—	—	—	—	—	60	92	91	35	MC: Platinum; BPI: Silver; RIAA: Platinum; RMNZ: Gold	Beauty Behind the Madness
"Prisoner" (featuring Lana Del Rey)	2015	51	—	113	—	—	—	95	78	47	16	MC: Gold; ARIA: Gold; RIAA: Platinum	Beauty Behind the Madness
"Angel"	2015	—	—	—	—	—	—	—	—	— (Note: "Angel" did not enter the Billboard Hot 100, but peaked at number 2 on the Bubbling Under Hot 100 Singles chart.)	38	MC: Gold	Beauty Behind the Madness
"Pray 4 Love" (Travis Scott featuring the Weeknd)	2015	—	—	—	—	—	—	—	—	—	— (Note: "Pray 4 Love" did not enter the Hot R&B/Hip-Hop Songs chart, but peaked at number one on the Bubbling Under R&B/Hip-Hop Singles chart.)	RIAA: Gold	Rodeo
"FML" (Kanye West featuring the Weeknd)	2016	—	—	—	—	—	—	—	84	84	30	RIAA: Platinum; BPI: Silver	The Life of Pablo
"6 Inch" (Beyoncé featuring the Weeknd)	2016	31	—	47	—	—	—	—	35	18	10	MC: Gold; ARIA: Gold; BPI: Silver; RIAA: Platinum	Lemonade
"True Colors"	2016	32	—	—	76	—	58	66	55	48	23	MC: Platinum; BPI: Silver; RIAA: Platinum; RMNZ: Gold	Starboy
"Stargirl Interlude" (featuring Lana Del Rey)	2016	51	—	—	93	—	60	—	73	61	32	MC: Gold; BPI: Platinum; RMNZ: 2× Platinum; SNEP: Platinum	Starboy
"Sidewalks" (featuring Kendrick Lamar)	2016	14	—	143	47	— (Note: "Sidewalks" did not enter the NZ Top 40 Singles Chart, but peaked at number two on the NZ Heatseeker Singles Chart.)	30	41	30	27	12	MC: 3× Platinum; BPI: Silver; RIAA: Platinum; RMNZ: Platinum	Starboy
"Six Feet Under"	2016	20	—	—	63	—	44	65	43	34	15	MC: Platinum; BPI: Silver; RIAA: Platinum; RMNZ: Gold	Starboy
"Love to Lay"	2016	45	—	—	97	—	83	85	68	71	39	MC: Gold; ARIA: Gold	Starboy
"A Lonely Night"	2016	40	—	117	72	—	57	67	53	69	37	MC: Gold; BPI: Silver	Starboy
"Attention"	2016	43	—	—	86	—	80	95	78	67	35	MC: Gold; ARIA: Gold	Starboy
"Ordinary Life"	2016	50	—	—	—	—	84	—	79	72	40	MC: Gold; BPI: Silver	Starboy
"Nothing Without You"	2016	46	—	—	—	—	78	—	81	68	36	MC: Gold; ARIA: Gold	Starboy
"All I Know" (featuring Future)	2016	38	—	184	99	—	68	—	76	46	21	MC: Gold; ARIA: Gold	Starboy
"Comin Out Strong" (Future featuring the Weeknd)	2017	43	—	82	—	— (Note: "Comin Out Strong" did not enter the NZ Top 40 Singles Chart, but peaked at number six on the NZ Heatseeker Singles Chart.)	—	—	83	48	19	MC: Platinum; BPI: Silver; RIAA: Platinum	Hndrxx
"UnFazed" (Lil Uzi Vert featuring the Weeknd)	2017	71	—	—	—	—	—	—	—	84	42	RIAA: Gold	Luv Is Rage 2
"Try Me"	2018	7	24	75	43	35	8	23	17	26	16	MC: Gold; ARIA: Platinum; BPI: Silver; RIAA: Platinum; RMNZ: Gold; SNEP: Gold	My Dear Melancholy
"Wasted Times"	2018	8	23	111	53	36	13	30	18	27	17	MC: Platinum; ARIA: Platinum; BPI: Silver; RIAA: Platinum; RMNZ: Gold	My Dear Melancholy
"I Was Never There" (with Gesaffelstein)	2018	12	40	112	67	— (Note: "I Was Never There" did not enter the NZ Top 40 Singles Chart, but peaked at number one on the NZ Heatseeker Singles Chart.)	23	40	— (Note: "I Was Never There" did not enter the Official UK Singles chart, but peaked at number 42 on the Official UK Streaming chart.)	35	20	MC: Gold; ARIA: 2× Platinum; BPI: Platinum; IFPI DEN: Gold; RIAA: Platinum; RMNZ: 2× Platinum; SNEP: Platinum	My Dear Melancholy
"Hurt You" (with Gesaffelstein)	2018	17	37	103	63	— (Note: "Hurt You" did not enter the NZ Top 40 Singles Chart, but peaked at number two on the NZ Heatseeker Singles Chart.)	28	33	— (Note: "Hurt You" did not enter the Official UK Singles chart, but peaked at number 45 on the Official UK Streaming chart.)	43	23	MC: 2× Platinum; ARIA: Platinum; BPI: Silver; RIAA: Platinum; RMNZ: Gold; SNEP: Gold	My Dear Melancholy
"Privilege"	2018	22	45	143	80	—	31	54	— (Note: "Privilege" did not enter the Official UK Singles chart, but peaked at number 56 on the Official UK Streaming chart.)	52	27	MC: Platinum; ARIA: Gold	My Dear Melancholy
"Skeletons" (Travis Scott featuring Pharrell Williams, Tame Impala and the Weeknd)	2018	42	49	110	—	—	61	— (Note: "Skeletons" did not enter the Swedish Singellista Chart, but peaked at number 12 on the Swedish Heatseeker Chart.)	— (Note: "Skeletons" did not enter the Official UK Singles chart, but peaked at number 81 on the Official UK Streaming chart.)	47	27	MC: Platinum; BPI: Silver; RIAA: 2× Platinum	Astroworld
"Thought I Knew You" (Nicki Minaj featuring the Weeknd)	2018	69	49	—	—	— (Note: "Hurt You" did not enter the NZ Top 40 Singles Chart, but peaked at number 19 on the NZ Heatseeker Singles Chart.)	—	—	—	98	—		Queen
"Alone Again"	2020	28	—	49	—	— (Note: "Alone Again" did not enter the NZ Top 40 Singles Chart, but peaked at number four on the NZ Hot Singles Chart.)	24	51	— (Note: "Alone Again" did not enter the Official UK Singles chart, but peaked at number 35 on the Official UK Streaming chart.)	21	10	ARIA: Gold	After Hours
"Too Late"	2020	38	—	59	—	—	27	54	— (Note: "Too Late" did not enter the Official UK Singles chart, but peaked at number 39 on the Official UK Streaming chart.)	28	13	MC: Platinum; ARIA: Gold	After Hours
"Hardest to Love"	2020	36	—	52	—	— (Note: "Hardest to Love" did not enter the NZ Top 40 Singles Chart, but peaked at number two on the NZ Hot Singles Chart.)	38	39	— (Note: "Hardest to Love" did not enter the Official UK Singles chart, but peaked at number 34 on the Official UK Streaming chart.)	25	—	MC: Platinum; ARIA: Gold	After Hours
"Scared to Live"	2020	33	—	56	—	— (Note: "Scared to Live" did not enter the NZ Top 40 Singles Chart, but peaked at number three on the NZ Hot Singles Chart.)	37	34	— (Note: "Scared to Live" did not enter the Official UK Singles chart, but peaked at number 40 on the Official UK Streaming chart.)	24	12	MC: Platinum; ARIA: Gold	After Hours
"Snowchild"	2020	32	—	80	—	—	50	72	— (Note: "Snowchild" did not enter the Official UK Singles chart, but peaked at number 44 on the Official UK Streaming chart.)	32	16	MC: Platinum; ARIA: Gold	After Hours
"Escape from LA"	2020	44	—	88	—	—	49	90	— (Note: "Escape from LA" did not enter the Official UK Singles chart, but peaked at number 50 on the Official UK Streaming chart.)	39	21	MC: Platinum; ARIA: Gold	After Hours
"Faith"	2020	43	—	85	—	—	56	81	— (Note: "Faith" did not enter the Official UK Singles chart, but peaked at number 47 on the Official UK Streaming chart.)	45	24	MC: Platinum; ARIA: Gold	After Hours
"Repeat After Me" (interlude)	2020	62	—	130	—	—	81	— (Note: "Repeat After Me" did not enter the Swedish Singellista Chart, but peaked at number eight on the Swedish Heatseeker Chart.)	— (Note: "Repeat After Me" did not enter the Official UK Singles chart, but peaked at number 96 on the Official UK Streaming chart.)	69	32		After Hours
"Until I Bleed Out"	2020	67	—	158	—	—	87	— (Note: "Until I Bleed Out" did not enter the Swedish Singellista Chart, but peaked at number 11 on the Swedish Heatseeker Chart.)	—	80	40		After Hours
"Nothing Compares"	2020	—	—	—	—	— (Note: "Nothing Compares" did not enter the NZ Top 40 Singles Chart, but peaked at number 32 on the NZ Hot Singles Chart.)	—	—	—	—	—		After Hours
"Missed You"	2020	—	—	—	—	— (Note: "Missed You" did not enter the NZ Top 40 Singles Chart, but peaked at number 31 on the NZ Hot Singles Chart.)	—	—	—	—	—	MC: Gold	After Hours
"Off the Table" (with Ariana Grande)	2020	27	32	—	164	— (Note: "Off the Table" did not enter the NZ Top 40 Singles Chart, but peaked at number four on the NZ Hot Singles Chart.)	93	— (Note: "Off the Table" did not enter the Swedish Singellista Chart, but peaked at number 16 on the Swedish Heatseeker Chart.)	— (Note: "Off the Table" did not enter the Official UK Singles Chart, but peaked at number 87 on the UK Singles Downloads Chart.)	35	—		Positions
"Dawn FM"	2022	59	55	77	—	—	37	69	— (Note: "Dawn FM" did not enter the UK Singles Chart, as chart rules only allow three songs per artist to chart within the top one hundred at a time, but peaked at number 60 on the Official UK Streaming chart.)	65	—		Dawn FM
"Gasoline"	2022	27	28	58	—	— (Note: "Gasoline" did not enter the NZ Top 40 Singles Chart, but peaked at number six on the NZ Hot Singles Chart.)	20	43	— (Note: "Gasoline" did not enter the UK Singles Chart, as chart rules only allow three songs per artist to chart within the top one hundred at a time, but peaked at number 32 on the Official UK Streaming chart.)	29	—	MC: Platinum	Dawn FM
"How Do I Make You Love Me?"	2022	16	27	56	44	—	21	24	22	39	—	ARIA: Gold	Dawn FM
"A Tale by Quincy"	2022	—	85	105	—	—	53	97	— (Note: "A Tale by Quincy" did not enter the UK Singles Chart, as chart rules only allow three songs per artist to chart within the top one hundred at a time, but peaked at number 91 on the Official UK Streaming chart.)	—	—		Dawn FM
"Here We Go... Again" (featuring Tyler, the Creator)	2022	21	46	83	—	—	32	72	— (Note: "Here We Go... Again" did not enter the UK Singles Chart, as chart rules only allow three songs per artist to chart within the top one hundred at a time, but peaked at number 59 on the Official UK Streaming chart.)	52	19		Dawn FM
"Best Friends"	2022	42	45	81	—	— (Note: "Best Friends" (Remix) did not enter the NZ Top 40 Singles Chart, but peaked at number 28 on the NZ Hot Singles Chart.)	34	64	— (Note: "Best Friends" did not enter the UK Singles Chart, as chart rules only allow three songs per artist to chart within the top one hundred at a time, but peaked at number 54 on the Official UK Streaming chart.)	60	23	MC: Platinum	Dawn FM
"Is There Someone Else?"	2022	12	18	68	—	— (Note: "Is There Someone Else?" did not enter the NZ Top 40 Singles Chart, but peaked at number four on the NZ Hot Singles Chart.)	18	41	45	31	10	MC: 3× Platinum; ARIA: Platinum; BPI: Gold; RMNZ: Platinum; SNEP: Gold	Dawn FM
"Starry Eyes"	2022	52	58	97	—	—	43	78	— (Note: "Starry Eyes" did not enter the UK Singles Chart, as chart rules only allow three songs per artist to chart within the top one hundred at a time, but peaked at number 65 on the Official UK Streaming chart.)	79	—		Dawn FM
"Every Angel Is Terrifying"	2022	72	90	147	—	—	62	— (Note: "Every Angel Is Terrifying" did not enter the Swedish Singellista Chart, but peaked at number nine on the Swedish Heatseeker Chart.)	—	93	—		Dawn FM
"Don't Break My Heart"	2022	41	75	128	—	—	56	— (Note: "Don't Break My Heart" did not enter the Swedish Singellista Chart, but peaked at number two on the Swedish Heatseeker Chart.)	— (Note: "Don't Break My Heart" did not enter the UK Singles Chart, as chart rules only allow three songs per artist to chart within the top one hundred at a time, but peaked at number 92 on the Official UK Streaming chart.)	85	34		Dawn FM
"I Heard You're Married" (featuring Lil Wayne)	2022	24	56	124	—	—	38	83	— (Note: "I Heard You're Married" did not enter the UK Singles Chart, as chart rules only allow three songs per artist to chart within the top one hundred at a time, but peaked at number 67 on the Official UK Streaming chart.)	62	25		Dawn FM
"Phantom Regret by Jim"	2022	—	—	—	—	—	89	— (Note: "Phantom Regret by Jim" did not enter the Swedish Singellista Chart, but peaked at number 20 on the Swedish Heatseeker Chart.)	—	—	—		Dawn FM
"Fill the Void" (with Lily-Rose Depp and Ramsey)	2023	—	—	—	—	— (Note: "Fill the Void" did not enter the NZ Top 40 Singles Chart, but peaked at number 33 on the NZ Hot Singles Chart.)	—	—	—	—	—		The Idol Episode 4 (Music from the HBO Original Series)
"Like a God"	2023	—	—	—	—	— (Note: "Like a God" did not enter the NZ Top 40 Singles Chart, but peaked at number 31 on the NZ Hot Singles Chart.)	—	—	—	—	—		The Idol Episode 5 Part 1 (Music from the HBO Original Series)
"False Idols" (with Lil Baby and Suzanna Son)	2023	—	—	—	—	— (Note: "False Idols" did not enter the NZ Top 40 Singles Chart, but peaked at number 20 on the NZ Hot Singles Chart.)	—	—	—	—	—		The Idol Episode 5 Part 1 (Music from the HBO Original Series)
"Dollhouse" (with Lily-Rose Depp)	2023	—	—	—	—	— (Note: "Dollhouse" did not enter the NZ Top 40 Singles Chart, but peaked at number 37 on the NZ Hot Singles Chart.)	—	—	—	—	—		The Idol Episode 5 Part 2 (Music from the HBO Original Series)
"Circus Maximus" (Travis Scott featuring the Weeknd and Swae Lee)	2023	32	49	57	—	—	—	— (Note: "Circus Maximus" did not enter the Swedish Singellista Chart, but peaked at number 10 on the Swedish Heatseeker Chart.)	— (Note: "Circus Maximus" did not enter the UK Singles Chart, as chart rules only allow three songs per artist to chart within the top one hundred at a time, but peaked at number 85 on the UK Streaming Chart.)	36	19	MC: Gold; RIAA: Gold	Utopia
"All to Myself" (with Future and Metro Boomin)	2024	90	—	—	—	—	—	—	—	67	28		We Still Don't Trust You
"Always Be My Fault" (with Future and Metro Boomin)	2024	—	—	—	—	—	—	—	—	— (Note: "Always Be My Fault" did not enter the Billboard Hot 100, but peaked at number 22 on the Bubbling Under Hot 100 Singles chart.)	—		We Still Don't Trust You
"Wake Me Up" (with Justice)	2025	28	61	28	—	— (Note: "Wake Me Up" did not enter the NZ Top 40 Singles Chart, but peaked at number four on the NZ Hot Singles Chart.)	—	52	— (Note: "Wake Me Up" did not enter the UK Singles Chart, as chart rules only allow three songs per artist to chart within the top one hundred at a time, but peaked at number 54 on the Official UK Streaming chart.)	45	—	MC: Platinum	Hurry Up Tomorrow
"Baptized in Fear"	2025	24	67	40	—	— (Note: "Baptized in Fear" did not enter the NZ Top 40 Singles Chart, but peaked at number six on the NZ Hot Singles Chart.)	—	60	— (Note: "Baptized in Fear" did not enter the UK Singles Chart, as chart rules only allow three songs per artist to chart within the top one hundred at a time, but peaked at number 61 on the Official UK Streaming chart.)	46	12	MC: Gold	Hurry Up Tomorrow
"Open Hearts"	2025	27	64	34	—	—	—	56	— (Note: "Open Hearts" did not enter the UK Singles Chart, as chart rules only allow three songs per artist to chart within the top one hundred at a time, but peaked at number 58 on the Official UK Streaming chart.)	48	—	MC: Gold; SNEP: Gold	Hurry Up Tomorrow
"Opening Night"	2025	57	—	78	—	—	—	— (Note: "Opening Night" did not enter the Swedish Singellista Chart, but peaked at number eight on the Swedish Heatseeker Chart.)	—	74	—		Hurry Up Tomorrow
"Reflections Laughing" (with Travis Scott and Florence and the Machine)	2025	29	75	44	—	— (Note: "Reflections Laughing" did not enter the NZ Top 40 Singles Chart, but peaked at number five on the NZ Hot Singles Chart.)	—	82	— (Note: "Reflections Laughing" did not enter the UK Singles Chart, as chart rules only allow three songs per artist to chart within the top one hundred at a time, but peaked at number 72 on the Official UK Streaming chart.)	53	—	MC: Gold	Hurry Up Tomorrow
"Enjoy the Show" (with Future)	2025	46	—	74	—	—	—	— (Note: "Enjoy the Show" did not enter the Swedish Singellista Chart, but peaked at number six on the Swedish Heatseeker Chart.)	—	60	16		Hurry Up Tomorrow
"Given Up on Me"	2025	53	—	90	—	—	—	— (Note: "Given Up on Me" did not enter the Swedish Singellista Chart, but peaked at number 18 on the Swedish Heatseeker Chart.)	—	71	19		Hurry Up Tomorrow
"I Can't Wait to Get There"	2025	65	—	112	—	—	—	—	—	82	23		Hurry Up Tomorrow
"Niagara Falls"	2025	38	—	99	—	—	—	— (Note: "Niagara Falls" did not enter the Swedish Singellista Chart, but peaked at number 10 on the Swedish Heatseeker Chart.)	—	65	18		Hurry Up Tomorrow
"Take Me Back to LA"	2025	55	—	108	—	—	—	— (Note: "Take Me Back to LA" did not enter the Swedish Singellista Chart, but peaked at number 17 on the Swedish Heatseeker Chart.)	—	69	—		Hurry Up Tomorrow
"Big Sleep" (with Giorgio Moroder)	2025	78	—	155	—	—	—	—	—	— (Note: "Big Sleep" did not enter the Billboard Hot 100, but peaked at number three on the Bubbling Under Hot 100 chart.)	—		Hurry Up Tomorrow
"Give Me Mercy"	2025	75	—	154	—	—	—	—	—	— (Note: "Give Me Mercy" did not enter the Billboard Hot 100, but peaked at number one on the Bubbling Under Hot 100 chart.)	—		Hurry Up Tomorrow
"Drive"	2025	81	—	190	—	—	—	—	—	— (Note: "Drive" did not enter the Billboard Hot 100, but peaked at number four on the Bubbling Under Hot 100 chart.)	33		Hurry Up Tomorrow
"The Abyss" (with Lana Del Rey)	2025	50	—	60	—	—	—	—	—	68	—	MC: Gold	Hurry Up Tomorrow
"Red Terror"	2025	80	—	170	—	—	—	—	—	— (Note: "Red Terror" did not enter the Billboard Hot 100, but peaked at number six on the Bubbling Under Hot 100 chart.)	34		Hurry Up Tomorrow
"Without a Warning"	2025	87	—	—	—	—	—	—	—	— (Note: "Without a Warning" did not enter the Billboard Hot 100, but peaked at number 10 on the Bubbling Under Hot 100 chart.)	38		Hurry Up Tomorrow
"Hurry Up Tomorrow"	2025	84	—	177	—	—	—	—	—	— (Note: "Hurry Up Tomorrow" did not enter the Billboard Hot 100, but peaked at number seven on the Bubbling Under Hot 100 chart.)	—		Hurry Up Tomorrow
"—" denotes a recording that did not chart or was not released in that territory.

== Guest appearances ==
=== Commercial releases ===
List of non-single guest appearances, showing credits, other artist(s), year released and album name
Title	Year	Credit	Other artist(s)	Album
"Shake It Out" (Remix)	2011	producer	Florence + The Machine	none
"Cameras / Good Ones Go Interlude"	2011	writer, vocals	Drake	Take Care
"Practice"	2011	writer	Drake	Take Care
"Shot for Me"	2011	writer	Drake	Take Care
"The Ride"	2011	writer, producer	Drake	Take Care
"Marry the Night"	2011	producer	Lady Gaga	Born This Way: The Remix
"One of Those Nights"	2013	artist, writer, producer	Juicy J	Stay Trippy (Deluxe Edition)
"Gifted"	2013	artist, writer	French Montana	Excuse My French
"I'm Good"	2013	artist, writer	Lil Wayne	Dedication 5
"Exodus"	2013	artist, writer	M.I.A.	Matangi
"Devil May Cry"	2013	artist, writer	none	The Hunger Games: Catching Fire
"In Vein"	2014	artist, writer, producer	Rick Ross	Mastermind
"Where You Belong"	2014	artist, writer	none	Fifty Shades of Grey (Original Motion Picture Soundtrack)
"Pullin Up"	2015	artist, writer	Meek Mill	Dreams Worth More Than Money
"Pray 4 Love"	2015	artist, writer, producer	Travis Scott	Rodeo
"Rambo (Last Blood)"	2015	artist, writer	Bryson Tiller	Trapsoul (Deluxe Edition)
"Woo"	2016	writer	Rihanna	Anti
"FML"	2016	writer, producer	Kanye West	The Life of Pablo
"6 Inch"	2016	artist, writer	Beyoncé	Lemonade
"Comin Out Strong"	2017	artist, writer	Future	Hndrxx
"Eyes Closed"	2017	writer	Halsey	Hopeless Fountain Kingdom
"UnFazed"	2017	artist, writer, producer	Lil Uzi Vert	Luv Is Rage 2
"Curve"	2017	artist, writer	Gucci Mane	Mr. Davis
"Come Thru"	2018	artist, writer	Trouble	Edgewood
"Bedtime Stories"	2018	artist, writer	Rae Sremmurd	SR3MM
"Skeletons"	2018	writer	Travis Scott	Astroworld
"Thought I Knew You"	2018	artist, writer	Nicki Minaj	Queen
"Cold Hearted II"	2018	additional vocals, writer	Meek Mill	Championships
"No Nightmares"	2020	writer, producer, vocals	Oneohtrix Point Never	Magic Oneohtrix Point Never
"Off the Table"	2020	artist, writer	Ariana Grande	Positions
"Christmas Blues"	2020	artist, writer	Sabrina Claudio	Christmas Blues
"Requiem"	2021	writer, vocals	Belly, Nav	See You Next Wednesday
"Two Tone"	2021	writer, producer	Belly, Lil Uzi Vert	See You Next Wednesday
"Artificial Intelligence"	2023	writer, producer	Mike Dean	4:23
"Defame Moi"	2023	writer, producer	Mike Dean	4:23
"Emotionless"	2023	writer, producer	Mike Dean	4:23
"More Coke!!"	2023	writer, producer	Mike Dean	4:23
"Once Upon a Time"	2023	writer, producer	Mike Dean	4:23
"Circus Maximus"	2023	artist, writer	Travis Scott, Swae Lee	Utopia
"All To Myself"	2024	artist, writer	Future, Metro Boomin	We Still Don't Trust You
"Always Be My Fault"	2024	artist, writer	Future, Metro Boomin	We Still Don't Trust You
"Distorted Time"	2024	writer, producer	Mike Dean	424
"The Weeknd's Dark Secret"	2024	writer, producer	American Dad! Cast	American Dad! Greatest Hits
"Unlimited"	2025	writer, vocals	Nav, Playboi Carti	OMW2 Rexdale

=== Non-commercial releases ===
List of non-single guest appearances, showing credits, other artist(s), year released and album name
Title	Year	Credit	Other artist(s)	Album
"Trust Issues" (Remix)	2011	artist, writer	none	none
"Enemy"	2012	artist, writer, producer	none	none
"Nomads"	2013	artist, writer	Ricky Hil	Support Your Local Drug Dealer
"Royals" (Remix)	2013	producer	Lorde	none
"Secrets" (original version or GXNXVS remix)	2013	artist	Jr. Hi	Virtual Lover EP
"Drunk in Love" (Remix)	2014	artist, writer, producer	none	none
"Pass Dat" (Remix)	2015	artist, writer	Starrah, Jeremih	none
"Might Not" (Remix)	2016	artist	Belly, Yo Gotti, 2 Chainz	none
"On the Couch"	2020	artist	Saturday Night Live	none
Title Unknown	2021	artist, writer, producer	none	none

== Production discography ==
List of production and non-performing songwriting credits for other artists (excluding guest appearances, interpolations, and samples)
Track(s)	Year	Credit	Artist(s)	Album
1. "High for This"	2011	Producer (with the Dream Machine)	the Weeknd	House of Balloons
2. "What You Need"	2011	Producer (with Jeremy Rose and Zodiac)	the Weeknd	House of Balloons
3. "House of Balloons / Glass Table Girls"	2011	Producer (with Doc McKinney and Illangelo)	the Weeknd	House of Balloons
4. "The Morning"	2011	Producer (with Doc McKinney and Illangelo)	the Weeknd	House of Balloons
5. "Wicked Games"	2011	Producer (with Doc McKinney and Illangelo)	the Weeknd	House of Balloons
6. "The Party and the After Party"	2011	Producer (with Rainer and Zodiac)	the Weeknd	House of Balloons
7. "Coming Down"	2011	Producer (with Doc McKinney and Illangelo)	the Weeknd	House of Balloons
8. "Loft Music"	2011	Producer (with Zoadiac)	the Weeknd	House of Balloons
9. "The Knowing"	2011	Producer (with Doc McKinney and Illangelo)	the Weeknd	House of Balloons
All tracks	2011	Producer (with Doc McKinney and Illangelo)	the Weeknd	Thursday
1. "D.D."	2011	Producer (with Illangelo)	the Weeknd	Echoes of Silence
2. "Montreal"	2011	Producer (with Illangelo)	the Weeknd	Echoes of Silence
3. "Outside"	2011	Producer (with Illangelo)	the Weeknd	Echoes of Silence
4. "XO / Host"	2011	Producer (with Illangelo)	the Weeknd	Echoes of Silence
5. "Initiation"	2011	Producer (with Illangelo and DropxLife)	the Weeknd	Echoes of Silence
6. "Same Old Song"; (featuring Juicy J)	2011	Producer (with Rainer and Zodiac)	the Weeknd	Echoes of Silence
7. "The Fall"	2011	Producer (with Clams Casino and Illangelo)	the Weeknd	Echoes of Silence
8. "Next"	2011	Producer (with Illangelo and Dropxlife)	the Weeknd	Echoes of Silence
9. "Echoes of Silence"	2011	Producer (with Doc McKinney and Illangelo)	the Weeknd	Echoes of Silence
2. "Shot for Me"	2011	Songwriter	Drake	Take Care
4. "Crew Love"; (featuring the Weeknd)	2011	Producer (with Illangelo and 40)	Drake	Take Care
17. "Practice"	2011	Songwriter	Drake	Take Care
18. "The Ride"; (featuring the Weeknd)	2011	Producer (with Doc McKinney)	Drake	Take Care
5. "Marry the Night" (The Weeknd and Illangelo Remix)	2011	Producer (with Illangelo)	Lady Gaga	Born This Way: The Remix
2. "Shake It Out" (The Weeknd Remix)	2011	Producer	Florence and the Machine	Shake It Out (Remixes)
10. (Volume 1) "Twenty Eight"	2012	Producer (with Doc McKinney and Illangelo)	the Weeknd	Trilogy
10. (Volume 2) "Valerie"	2012	Producer (with Doc McKinney and Illangelo)	the Weeknd	Trilogy
10. (Volume 3) "Till Dawn (Here Comes the Sun)"	2012	Producer (with Doc McKinney and Illangelo)	the Weeknd	Trilogy
19. "One of Those Nights"; (featuring the Weeknd)	2013	Producer (with DannyBoyStyles)	Juicy J	Stay Trippy
1. "Professional"	2013	Producer (with DannyBoyStyles, DaHeala, and Harry Fraud)	the Weeknd	Kiss Land
2. "The Town"	2013	Producer (with DannyBoyStyles and DaHeala)	the Weeknd	Kiss Land
3. "Adaptation"	2013	Producer (with DannyBoyStyles and DaHeala)	the Weeknd	Kiss Land
4. "Love in the Sky"	2013	Producer (with DannyBoyStyles and DaHeala)	the Weeknd	Kiss Land
5. "Belong to the World"	2013	Producer (with DannyBoyStyles and DaHeala)	the Weeknd	Kiss Land
6. "Live For"; (featuring Drake)	2013	Producer (with DannyBoyStyles and DaHeala)	the Weeknd	Kiss Land
7. "Wanderlust"	2013	Producer (with DannyBoyStyles and DaHeala)	the Weeknd	Kiss Land
8. "Kiss Land"	2013	Producer (with Silkky Johnson and DaHeala)	the Weeknd	Kiss Land
9. "Pretty"	2013	Producer (with DannyBoyStyles, DaHeala, and Brandon Hollemon)	the Weeknd	Kiss Land
10. "Tears in the Rain"	2013	Producer (with DannyBoyStyles and DaHeala)	the Weeknd	Kiss Land
13. "In Vein"; (featuring the Weeknd)	2014	Producer (with DaHeala and Puff Daddy)	Rick Ross	Mastermind
"King of the Fall"	2014	Producer (with DaHeala)	the Weeknd	Non-album single
1. "Real Life"	2015	Producer (with DaHeala)	the Weeknd	Beauty Behind the Madness
2. "Losers"; (featuring Labrinth)	2015	Producer (with Labrinth and Illangelo)	the Weeknd	Beauty Behind the Madness
3. "Tell Your Friends"	2015	Producer (with Che Pope, Kanye West, Illangelo, Mike Dean, Noah Goldstein, and Omar Riad)	the Weeknd	Beauty Behind the Madness
4. "Often"	2015	Producer (with Ben Billions and DaHeala)	the Weeknd	Beauty Behind the Madness
6. "Acquainted"	2015	Producer (with Ben Billions, Illangelo, DaHeala, and DannyBoyStyles)	the Weeknd	Beauty Behind the Madness
8. "Shameless"	2015	Producer (with Max Martin, Ali Payami, and Peter Svensson)	the Weeknd	Beauty Behind the Madness
10. "In the Night"	2015	Producer (with Max Martin and Ali Payami)	the Weeknd	Beauty Behind the Madness
11. "As You Are"	2015	Producer (with DaHeala, Illangelo, DannyBoyStyles, and Ben Billions)	the Weeknd	Beauty Behind the Madness
13. "Prisoner"; (featuring Lana Del Rey)	2015	Producer (with Illangelo)	the Weeknd	Beauty Behind the Madness
14. "Angel"	2015	Producer (with Stephan Moccio)	the Weeknd	Beauty Behind the Madness
6. "Pray 4 Love"; (featuring the Weeknd)	2015	Producer (with Travis Scott, Illangelo, Mike Dean, Ben Billions, and Allen Ritter)	Travis Scott	Rodeo
6. "Woo"	2016	Songwriter	Rihanna	Anti
10. "Low Life"; (featuring the Weeknd)	2016	Producer (with Metro Boomin, Ben Billions, and DaHeala)	Future	Evol
1. "Starboy"; (featuring Daft Punk)	2016	Producer (with Daft Punk, Doc McKinney, and Cirkut)	the Weeknd	Starboy
2. "Party Monster"	2016	Producer (with Ben Billions and Doc McKinney)	the Weeknd	Starboy
3. "False Alarm"	2016	Producer (with Doc McKinney, Cirkut, and Mano)	the Weeknd	Starboy
5. "Rockin'"	2016	Producer (with Max Martin and Ali Payami)	the Weeknd	Starboy
6. "Secrets"	2016	Producer (with Doc McKinney and Cirkut)	the Weeknd	Starboy
7. "True Colors"	2016	Producer (with Benny Blanco, Cashmere Cat, Jake One, and Swish)	the Weeknd	Starboy
10. "Six Feet Under"	2016	Producer (with Doc McKinney, Cirkut, Metro Boomin, and Ben Billions)	the Weeknd	Starboy
11. "Love to Lay"	2016	Producer (with Max Martin and Ali Payami)	the Weeknd	Starboy
13. "Attention"	2016	Producer (with Benny Blanco, Cashmere Cat, and Frank Dukes)	the Weeknd	Starboy
15. "Nothing Without You"	2016	Producer (with Diplo, Ben Billions, and Cirkut)	the Weeknd	Starboy
16. "All I Know"; (featuring Future)	2016	Producer (with Ben Billions and Cashmere Cat)	the Weeknd	Starboy
17. "Die for You"	2016	Producer (with Doc McKinney, Cirkut, Cashmere Cat, and Prince 85)	the Weeknd	Starboy
18. "I Feel It Coming"; (featuring Daft Punk)	2016	Producer (with Daft Punk, Doc McKinney, and Cirkut)	the Weeknd	Starboy
3. "Eyes Closed"	2017	Songwriter	Halsey	Hopeless Fountain Kingdom
10. "UnFazed"; (featuring the Weeknd)	2017	Producer (with DaHeala, Don Cannon, and Maaly Raw)	Lil Uzi Vert	Luv Is Rage 2
3. "Lost in the Fire"; (featuring the Weeknd)	2019	Co-producer (with Gesaffelstein, DaHeala, and Nate Donmoyer)	Gesaffelstein	Hyperion
3. "Power Is Power"	2019	Producer (with Ricky Reed, DaHeala, Myles Martin, and King Garbage)	SZA, the Weeknd, Travis Scott	Various artists – For the Throne: Music Inspired by the HBO Series Game of Thrones
1. "Alone Again"	2020	Producer (with Illangelo, DaHeala, and Frank Dukes)	the Weeknd	After Hours
2. "Too Late"	2020	Producer (with Illangelo, Ricky Reed, DaHeala, and Nate Mercereau)	the Weeknd	After Hours
3. "Hardest to Love"	2020	Producer (with Max Martin and Oscar Holter)	the Weeknd	After Hours
4. "Scared to Live"	2020	Producer (with Max Martin and Oscar Holter)	the Weeknd	After Hours
5. "Snowchild"	2020	Producer (with Illangelo and DaHeala)	the Weeknd	After Hours
6. "Escape from LA"	2020	Producer (with Metro Boomin and Illangelo)	the Weeknd	After Hours
7. "Heartless"	2020	Producer (with Metro Boomin, Illangelo, and Dre Moon)	the Weeknd	After Hours
8. "Faith"	2020	Producer (with Metro Boomin and Illangelo)	the Weeknd	After Hours
9. "Blinding Lights"	2020	Producer (with Max Martin and Oscar Holter)	the Weeknd	After Hours
10. "In Your Eyes"	2020	Producer (with Max Martin and Oscar Holter)	the Weeknd	After Hours
11. "Save Your Tears"	2020	Producer (with Max Martin and Oscar Holter)	the Weeknd	After Hours
13. "After Hours"	2020	Producer (with Illangelo, DaHeala, and Mario Winans)	the Weeknd	After Hours
14. "Until I Bleed Out"	2020	Producer (with Metro Boomin, OPN, Prince 85, and Notinbed)	the Weeknd	After Hours
15. "Nothing Compares"	2020	Producer (with DaHeala and Ricky Reed)	the Weeknd	After Hours
16. "Missed You"	2020	Producer (with DaHeala)	the Weeknd	After Hours
17. "Final Lullaby"	2020	Producer (with DaHeala)	the Weeknd	After Hours
"Over Now"	2020	Producer (with Calvin Harris and Frank Dukes)	Calvin Harris, the Weeknd	Non-album singles
9. "Requiem"; (featuring Nav)	2021	Songwriter, background vocals	Belly	See You Next Wednesday
10. "Two Tone"; (featuring Lil Uzi Vert)	2021	Producer (with the ANMLS)	Belly	See You Next Wednesday
3. "La Fama"; (featuring the Weeknd)	2021	Producer (with Rosalia, Tainy, Frank Dukes, Sky Rompiendo, El Guincho, Noah Goldstein and Sir Dylan)	Rosalía	Motomami
1. "Dawn FM"	2022	Producer (with OPN, Max Martin, and Oscar Holter)	the Weeknd	Dawn FM
2. "Gasoline"	2022	Producer (with OPN, Max Martin, Oscar Holter, and Matt Cohn)	the Weeknd	Dawn FM
3. "How Do I Make You Love Me?"	2022	Producer (with OPN, Max Martin, Swedish House Mafia, Oscar Holter, and Matt Cohn)	the Weeknd	Dawn FM
4. "Take My Breath"	2022	Producer (with Max Martin and Oscar Holter)	the Weeknd	Dawn FM
5. "Sacrifice"	2022	Producer (with Max Martin, Swedish House Mafia, and Oscar Holter)	the Weeknd	Dawn FM
6. "A Tale by Quincy"	2022	Producer (with OPN, Max Martin, and Gitty)	the Weeknd	Dawn FM
7. "Out of Time"	2022	Producer (with OPN, Max Martin, and Oscar Holter)	the Weeknd	Dawn FM
8. "Here We Go... Again"; (featuring Tyler, the Creator)	2022	Producer (with Rex Kudo, Bruce Johnston, Brian Kennedy, Benny Bock, and Charlie Coffeen)	the Weeknd	Dawn FM
9. "Best Friends"	2022	Producer (with DaHeala, OPN, Max Martin, Oscar Holter, and Matt Cohn)	the Weeknd	Dawn FM
10. "Is There Someone Else?"	2022	Producer (with OPN, Tommy Brown, Peter Lee Johnson, Max Martin, and Oscar Holter)	the Weeknd	Dawn FM
11. "Starry Eyes"	2022	Producer (with OPN, Max Martin, and Oscar Holter)	the Weeknd	Dawn FM
12. "Every Angel Is Terrifying"	2022	Producer (with OPN and Matt Cohn)	the Weeknd	Dawn FM
13. "Don't Break My Heart"	2022	Producer (with OPN, Max Martin, Oscar Holter, and Matt Cohn)	the Weeknd	Dawn FM
14. "I Heard You're Married"; (featuring Lil Wayne)	2022	Producer (with Calvin Harris, OPN, Max Martin, and Oscar Holter)	the Weeknd	Dawn FM
15. "Less than Zero"	2022	Producer (with Max Martin, Oscar Holter, and OPN)	the Weeknd	Dawn FM
16. "Phantom Regret by Jim"	2022	Producer (with OPN, Max Martin, Oscar Holter, and Matt Cohn)	the Weeknd	Dawn FM
—N/a	2023	Executive producer	Mike Dean	4:23
1. "Once Upon a Time"	2023	Producer (with Tommy Rush and Mike Dean)	Mike Dean	4:23
2. "Artificial Intelligence"	2023	Producer (with Sam Levinson and Mike Dean)	Mike Dean	4:23
3. "Defame Moi"	2023	Producer (with Mike Dean)	Mike Dean	4:23
4. "More Coke!!"	2023	Producer (with Mike Dean)	Mike Dean	4:23
12. "Emotionless"	2023	Producer (with Mike Dean)	Mike Dean	4:23
16. "Where We Came From"	2024	Songwriter (Note: "Where We Came From" samples a recorded 2012 the Weeknd song titled "Marylyn (Witches and Panthers)"; "Marylyn (Witches and Panthers)" lacks an official release.)	French Montana	Mac & Cheese 5
5. "Distorted Time"	2024	Producer (with Mike Dean)	Mike Dean	424
5. "Unlimited"; (featuring Playboi Carti)	2025	Additional vocals, songwriter	Nav	OMW2 Rexdale
