= Music from The Idol =

Music featured in the 2023 HBO drama series

The original music created by Canadian singer the Weeknd for the 2023 HBO drama television series The Idol (which he also created and starred in), consists of six separately released EPs released between June 9, 2023, and July 3, 2023. Originally, the music was set to be released all together on June 30, 2023, as a soundtrack album titled The Idol, Vol. 1 through XO and Republic Records. However, it was later announced on June 8, 2023, that EPs containing original songs and instrumentals from the show would be released following or preceding the release of each episode. The overall soundtrack was executively produced by Tesfaye himself, EPs contain guest appearances from Mike Dean, Lily-Rose Depp, Suzanna Son, Future, Moses Sumney, Jennie, Ramsey, Lil Baby, and Troye Sivan.

== Singles ==
Professional ratings
Review scores
Source	Rating
Pitchfork	6.1/10

Before the album was repurposed into multiple EPs, there were two singles released to promote it; "Double Fantasy", which was released on April 21, 2023, and features American rapper Future, and "Popular", a collaboration with American rapper Playboi Carti and American singer Madonna that was released on June 2, 2023. Although "Double Fantasy" was later released on The Idol Episode 2 (Music from the HBO Original Series), "Popular" was not included on any of the EPs, becoming a stand-alone release. "One of the Girls", a collaboration with South Korean singer Jennie and French-American singer Lily-Rose Depp, was initially included as part of The Idol Episode 4 (Music from the HBO Original Series) and then released as a third single on December 8, 2023. "Popular" and "One of the Girls" were later included on the 2024 deluxe edition of the Weeknd's greatest hits album The Highlights (2021).

== The Idol Episode 1 (Music from the HBO Original Series) ==
The Idol Episode 1 (Music from the HBO Original Series)

EP by the Weeknd, Mike Dean and Lily-Rose Depp
- Released: June 9, 2023
- Length: 7:57
- Labels: XO; Republic
- Producers: Asa Taccone; Mike Dean; The Weeknd

The Weeknd chronology
Live at SoFi Stadium (2023)	The Idol Episode 1 (Music from the HBO Original Series) (2023)	The Idol Episode 2 (Music from the HBO Original Series) (2023)

The Idol Episode 1 (Music from the HBO Original Series) is an EP featuring music from the first episode of The Idol, "Pop Tarts & Rat Tales". The EP was released on June 9, 2023, and consists of two songs: "World Class Sinner / I'm A Freak" as performed in the show by Lily-Rose Depp, and the show's main theme score, "The Lure", which was composed by Mike Dean and featured vocals from The Weeknd.

=== Track listing ===
The Idol Episode 1 (Music from the HBO Original Series) track listing
No.	Title	Writer(s)	Producer(s)	Length
1.	"The Lure (Main Theme)" ( The Weeknd; Mike Dean)	Abel Tesfaye; Michael Dean	The Weeknd; Mike Dean	4:38
2.	"World Class Sinner / I'm a Freak" (Lily-Rose Depp)	Tesfaye; Asa Taccone	Asa Taccone	3:19
Total length:				7:57

== The Idol Episode 2 (Music from the HBO Original Series) ==
The Idol Episode 2 (Music from the HBO Original Series)

EP by the Weeknd, Mike Dean and Suzanna Son
- Released: June 12, 2023
- Length: 13:09
- Labels: XO; Republic
- Producers: Metro Boomin; Mike Dean; Sage Skolfield; Sam Levinson; The Weeknd

The Weeknd chronology
The Idol Episode 1 (Music from the HBO Original Series) (2023)	The Idol Episode 2 (Music from the HBO Original Series) (2023)	The Idol Episode 3 (Music from the HBO Original Series) (2023)

Singles from The Idol Episode 2 (Music from the HBO Original Series)
- 1. "Double Fantasy" Released: April 21, 2023

The Idol Episode 2 (Music from the HBO Original Series) is an EP featuring music from the second episode of The Idol, "Double Fantasy". The EP was released on June 12, 2023, and consists of three songs: "Family" performed by Suzanna Son and the Weeknd, the instrumental "Devil's Paradise" composed by Mike Dean, and the pre-released track "Double Fantasy" by the Weeknd featuring American rapper Future.

=== Track listing ===
The Idol Episode 2 (Music from the HBO Original Series) track listing
No.	Title	Writer(s)	Producer(s)	Length
1.	"Family" ( The Weeknd; Suzanna Son)	Abel Tesfaye; Michael Dean; Suzanna Son	The Weeknd; Mike Dean; Sage Skolfield^{[b]}	3:04
2.	"Devil's Paradise" (Mike Dean)	Dean; Samuel Levinson	Dean; Sam Levinson	5:38
3.	"Double Fantasy" (The Weeknd featuring Future)	Tesfaye; Dean; Leland Wayne; Nayvadius Cash	The Weeknd; Dean; Metro Boomin^{[a]}	4:28
Total length:				13:10

- ^{^[a]} signifies a co-producer
- ^{^[b]} signifies an additional producer

== The Idol Episode 3 (Music from the HBO Original Series) ==
The Idol Episode 3 (Music from the HBO Original Series)

EP by the Weeknd and Moses Sumney
- Released: June 19, 2023
- Length: 13:09
- Labels: XO; Republic
- Producers: Metro Boomin; Mike Dean; Moses Sumney; Oneohtrix Point Never; Roman GianArthur; Sam Levinson; Sensei Bueno; The Weeknd

The Weeknd chronology
The Idol Episode 2 (Music from the HBO Original Series) (2023)	The Idol Episode 3 (Music from the HBO Original Series) (2023)	The Idol Episode 4 (Music from the HBO Original Series) (2023)

The Idol Episode 3 (Music from the HBO Original Series) is an EP featuring music from the third episode of The Idol, "Daybreak". The EP was released on June 19, 2023, and consists of three songs: "A Lesser Man" and "Take Me Back", which were both performed by the Weeknd, and "Get It B4", which was performed by Moses Sumney.

=== Track listing ===
The Idol Episode 3 (Music from the HBO Original Series) track listing
No.	Title	Writer(s)	Producer(s)	Length
1.	"A Lesser Man" (The Weeknd)	Abel Tesfaye; Michael Dean; Samuel Levinson	The Weeknd; Mike Dean; Metro Boomin^{[a]}	4:59
2.	"Take Me Back" (The Weeknd)	Tesfaye; Dean; Jason Quenneville	The Weeknd; Dean; Metro Boomin^{[a]}	3:48
3.	"Get It B4" (Moses Sumney)	Jarrett Goodly; Moses Sumney; Roman GianArthur	Moses Sumney; Roman GianArthur; Sensei Bueno; Oneohtrix Point Never^{[b]}	4:22
Total length:				13:09

- ^{^[a]} signifies a co-producer
- ^{^[b]} signifies an additional producer

== The Idol Episode 4 (Music from the HBO Original Series) ==
The Idol Episode 4 (Music from the HBO Original Series)

EP by the Weeknd, Jennie and Lily-Rose Depp
- Released: June 23, 2023
- Length: 10:41
- Labels: XO; Republic
- Producers: Mike Dean; Ramsey; Sage Skolfield; The Weeknd

The Weeknd chronology
The Idol Episode 3 (Music from the HBO Original Series) (2023)	The Idol Episode 4 (Music from the HBO Original Series) (2023)	The Idol Episode 5 Part 1 (Music from the HBO Original Series) (2023)

Singles from The Idol Episode 4 (Music from the HBO Original Series)
- 1. "One of the Girls" Released: December 8, 2023

The Idol Episode 4 (Music from the HBO Original Series) is an EP featuring music from the fourth episode of The Idol, "Stars Belong to the World". The EP was released on June 23, 2023, and consists of three songs: "One of the Girls" by the Weeknd, Jennie and Lily-Rose Depp; a cover of John Lennon's "Jealous Guy" performed by the Weeknd and "Fill the Void" by the Weeknd, Depp and Ramsey. "One of the Girls" was released as the EP's first single on December 8, 2023.

=== Track listing ===
The Idol Episode 4 (Music from the HBO Original Series) track listing
No.	Title	Writer(s)	Producer(s)	Length
1.	"One of the Girls" ( The Weeknd; Jennie; Lily-Rose Depp)	Abel Tesfaye; Michael Dean; Samuel Levinson; Lily-Rose Depp; Rebecca Fisher	The Weeknd; Mike Dean; Sage Skolfield^{[b]}	4:04
2.	"Jealous Guy" (The Weeknd)	John Lennon	The Weeknd; Dean	3:29
3.	"Fill the Void" ( The Weeknd; Lily-Rose Depp; Ramsey)	Tesfaye; Dean; Fisher	The Weeknd; Dean; Ramsey	3:05
Total length:				10:38

- ^{^[b]} signifies an additional producer

== The Idol Episode 5 Part 1 (Music from the HBO Original Series) ==
The Idol Episode 5 Part 1 (Music from the HBO Original Series)

EP by the Weeknd, Lil Baby and Suzanna Son
- Released: June 30, 2023
- Length: 8:09
- Labels: XO; Republic
- Producers: Mike Dean; Sage Skolfield; The Weeknd

The Weeknd chronology
The Idol Episode 4 (Music from the HBO Original Series) (2023)	The Idol Episode 5 Part 1 (Music from the HBO Original Series) (2023)	The Idol Episode 5 Part 2 (Music from the HBO Original Series) (2023)

The Idol Episode 5 Part 1 (Music from the HBO Original Series) is the first of two EPs featuring music from the fifth episode of The Idol, "Jocelyn Forever". The EP was released receding the premiere of the episode, and consists of two songs: "Like a God" performed by the Weeknd and "False Idols" with The Weeknd, Lil Baby, and Suzanna Son.

=== Track listing ===
The Idol Episode 5 Part 1 (Music from the HBO Original Series) track listing
No.	Title	Writer(s)	Producer(s)	Length
1.	"Like a God" (The Weeknd)	Abel Tesfaye; Michael Dean; Suzanna Son	The Weeknd; Mike Dean; Sage Skolfield^{[b]}	3:47
2.	"False Idols" ( The Weeknd; Lil Baby; Suzanna Son)	Tesfaye; Dean; Son; Dominique Jones	The Weeknd; Dean	4:22
Total length:				8:09

- ^{^[b]} signifies an additional producer

== The Idol Episode 5 Part 2 (Music from the HBO Original Series) ==
The Idol Episode 5 Part 2 (Music from the HBO Original Series)

EP by the Weeknd, Lily-Rose Depp and Suzanna Son
- Released: July 3, 2023
- Length: 10:16
- Labels: XO; Republic
- Producers: Bram Inscore; Mike Dean; Ramsey; Sage Skolfield; The Weeknd

The Weeknd chronology
The Idol Episode 5 Part 1 (Music from the HBO Original Series) (2023)	The Idol Episode 5 Part 2 (Music from the HBO Original Series) (2023)	Hurry Up Tomorrow (2025)

The Idol Episode 5 Part 2 (Music from the HBO Original Series) is the second of two EPs featuring music from the fifth episode of The Idol, "Jocelyn Forever". The EP was released following the premiere of the episode, and consists of three songs: "Dollhouse" performed by the Weeknd and Lily-Rose Depp, a cover of the George Harrison song "My Sweet Lord" performed by Troye Sivan, and "Crocodile Tears" by Suzanna Son.

=== Track listing ===
The Idol Episode 5 Part 2 (Music from the HBO Original Series) track listing
No.	Title	Writer(s)	Producer(s)	Length
1.	"Dollhouse" ( The Weeknd; Lily-Rose Depp)	Abel Tesfaye; Michael Dean; Rebecca Fisher	The Weeknd; Mike Dean; Ramsey	4:00
2.	"My Sweet Lord" (Troye Sivan)	George Harrison	The Weeknd; Dean; Bram Inscore^{[b]}	3:13
3.	"Crocodile Tears" (Suzanna Son)	Suzanna Son	Sage Skolfield	3:03
Total length:				10:16

- ^{^[b]} signifies an additional producer

== The Idol ==
The Idol

Studio album by The Weeknd
- Released: September 11, 2026
- Length: 47:05
- Label: Universal Music Japan
- Producers: The Weeknd; Mike Dean; Max Martin; Metro Boomin; Oscar Holter; Ramsey; Sage Skolfield; Tommy Rush

The Weeknd chronology
Hurry Up Tomorrow (2025)	The Idol (2026)

The Idol was formally released as album on September 11, 2026 as part of the After Hours til Dawn collection of CDs for Japan.

=== Track listing ===
The Idol track listing
No.	Title	Writer(s)	Producer(s)	Length
1.	"One of the Girls" ( The Weeknd; Jennie; Lily-Rose Depp)	Abel Tesfaye; Michael Dean; Samuel Levinson; Lily-Rose Depp; Rebecca Fisher	The Weeknd; Mike Dean; Sage Skolfield^{[b]}	4:04
2.	"Jealous Guy" ( The Weeknd)	John Lennon	The Weeknd; Dean	3:29
3.	"Double Fantasy" (The Weeknd featuring Future)	Tesfaye; Dean; Leland Wayne; Nayvadius Cash	The Weeknd; Dean; Metro Boomin^{[a]}	4:28
4.	"Popular" ( The Weeknd; Madonna; Playboi Carti)	Tesfaye; Dean; Levinson; Wayne; John Flippin; Jordan Carter; Michael Walker; Thomas Mikailin	The Weeknd; Dean; Metro Boomin; Tommy Rush^{[b]}	3:35
5.	"Like a God" ( The Weeknd)	Tesfaye; Dean; Suzanna Son	The Weeknd; Dean; Skolfield^{[b]}	3:46
6.	"False Idols" ( The Weeknd; Lil Baby; Suzanna Son)	Tesfaye; Dean; Son; Dominique Jones	The Weeknd; Dean	4:22
7.	"A Lesser Man" ( The Weeknd)	Tesfaye; Dean; Levinson	The Weeknd; Dean; Metro Boomin^{[a]}	4:58
8.	"Fill the Void" ( The Weeknd; Lily-Rose Depp; Ramsey)	Tesfaye; Dean; Fisher	The Weeknd; Dean; Ramsey	3:05
9.	"Dollhouse" ( Lily-Rose Depp; The Weeknd)	Tesfaye; Dean; Fisher	The Weeknd; Dean; Ramsey	3:59
10.	"Take Me Back" ( The Weeknd)	Tesfaye; Dean; Jason Quenneville	The Weeknd; Dean; Metro Boomin^{[a]}	3:47
11.	"The Lure (Main Theme)" ( The Weeknd; Mike Dean)	Tesfaye; Dean	The Weeknd; Dean	4:37
12.	"Society^{[c]}" ( The Weeknd)	Tesfaye; Karl Sandberg; Oscar Holter	The Weeknd; Max Martin; Oscar Holter	2:53
Total length:				47:03

- ^{^[a]} signifies a co-producer.
- ^{^[b]} signifies an additional producer.
- ^{^[c]} "Society" is listed as a bonus song.

== Charts ==
Chart performance for The Idol, Vol. 1
Chart (2023)	Peak position
Australian Albums (ARIA)	73

== See also ==
- The Weeknd discography
