= Popular (The Weeknd, Playboi Carti and Madonna song) =

2023 single by the Weeknd, Playboi Carti and Madonna

Single by the Weeknd, Playboi Carti and Madonna

from the album The Highlights (Deluxe)
- A-side: "One of the Girls" (double A-side)
- Released: June 2, 2023
- Genre: R&B
- Length: 3:35
- Label: XO; Republic
- Songwriters: Abel Tesfaye; Jordan Carter; Leland Wayne; Michael Dean; Tommy Rush; Sam Levinson; Michael Walker; John Flippin
- Producers: The Weeknd; Metro Boomin; Mike Dean; Rush

The Weeknd singles chronology
"Double Fantasy" (2023)	"Popular" (2023)	"K-pop" (2023)

Madonna singles chronology
"Back That Up to the Beat" (2022)	"Popular" (2023)	"Vulgar" (2023)

Playboi Carti singles chronology
"Off the Grid" (2021)	"Popular" (2023)	"Carnival" (2024)

Music video
- "Popular" on YouTube

"Popular" is a song by Canadian singer the Weeknd, American rapper Playboi Carti, and American singer Madonna. It was released on June 2, 2023, through XO and Republic Records, originally serving as the second single from The Idol, Vol. 1, the now scrapped soundtrack album to the Weeknd's HBO television series, The Idol. The song was later included on the 2024 deluxe edition of the Weeknd's greatest hits album The Highlights (2021). An R&B song, it was written by the Weeknd and Playboi Carti with producers Metro Boomin, Mike Dean, and Tommy Rush, alongside The Idol co-creator Sam Levinson, Michael Walker, and John Flippin.

Commercially, "Popular" charted within the top 10 in the Weeknd's home country of Canada, as well as Australia, Japan, New Zealand, and the United Kingdom, and it became a top 20 hit in countries such as Belgium, India, Ireland, and Switzerland. "Popular" was certified gold in New Zealand, United Kingdom, France, Italy and other music markets. In the United States, "Popular" was certified platinum in June 2024. The song earned positive reviews from music critics. Upon its release, it was picked up as one of the best songs of the year at that point by Rolling Stone.

== Background ==
On May 30, 2022, the Weeknd announced that The Idol, Vol. 1, the accompanying soundtrack for the HBO drama series The Idol due for release on June 30, would include a single by himself, Madonna and Playboi Carti, titled "Popular". A snippet of the song was first teased at the 2023 Cannes Film Festival, where the series premiered on May 22, 2023. The song was officially released as the soundtrack's second single on June 2.

Originally a collaboration between only the Weeknd and Playboi Carti, and with a different version prior to Madonna, in an interview with Zane Lowe on Apple Music 1, the Weeknd said "I've always wanted to work with her". He continued saying: "She's the ultimate co-sign for this song, for this album, and for this TV show. And you'll hear more of her in the show as well too. She is the ultimate pop star".

On January 26, 2024, after seeing a resurgence in commercial performance, an EP with multiple versions of the single was released. Playboi Carti continued to use this song in a sample in his 2025 album, Music on the track "Evil J0rdan".

== Composition ==
"Popular" is a midtempo R&B song, whose lyrics give allusion to the "allure and pitfalls of fame and fortune" referring to a woman who "will do anything to achieve celebrity status". Starr Bowenbank from Billboard called the song a "slinky track", laden with "booming synth instrumentals and plinking percussion" reminiscent of early 2000s R&B urban pop.

== Critical reception ==
"Popular" was well received by music critics. In a positive review for Billboard, Jason Lipshutz wrote: "The Weeknd, Madonna and Playboi Carti function like Kendall, Shiv and Roman pre-boardroom drama: what looks like an odd collection of artists on paper complement each other nicely, with The Weeknd and Madonna providing pop flourishes over plinking rhythms and Carti accentuating the song with some of his trademark mumbling to polish off what could be a kicky summer song". Remarking on its lyrics, Jennifer Zhan of Vulture hailed the song a new anthem for "clout chasers". Sebas E. Alonso from Jenesaispop complimented the song, and said sounds a bit like Madonna and Michael Jackson's dream collaboration. American Songwriter's Thomas Galindo called the Weeknd's verse "ingenious"; Madonna's "a standout moment"; and noted how the song is able to use Playboi Carti's "squeaky-voiced bridge to the fullest", despite a minimal contribution. Kevin Bourne from Shifter Magazine called it "a surprising treat that we didn't know we wanted".

Upon release, "Popular" won a poll conducted by Billboard as reader's favorite new music release of the week. On June 14, 2023, Rolling Stone picked it as one of the best songs of the year so far.

== Commercial performance ==
"Popular" debuted and peaked at number 43 on the Billboard Hot 100 with 10.1 million official streams, 2 million airplay audience impressions and 4,000 copies sold in its first week, according to Luminate. The song gave Madonna her first Hot 100 chart entry in approximately eight years since "Bitch I'm Madonna" (2015), her highest-peaking in 11 years since "Give Me All Your Luvin'" (2012), and her 58th entry overall. The debut of "Popular" made Madonna one of few artists to have a Hot 100 entry across five consecutive decades, and the second woman to achieve the feat after Cher. "Popular" lasted on the charts for 19 weeks. The song also marks Madonna's first R&B number-one song on a Billboard chart, topping the component R&B Digital Song Sales. On June 20, 2024, the song was certified platinum, which became Madonna's first song to achieve this since "4 Minutes" (2008).

In the United Kingdom, "Popular" peaked at number 10, becoming Madonna's highest-peaking single in the UK since "Celebration" reached number three in 2009 and her 64th top-ten hit across four non-consecutive decades. This extended Madonna's record for the female artist with the most top-ten songs on the chart. It also marked Playboi Carti's first top-ten and the Weeknd's 16th top-ten single in the country. "Popular" debuted within the top 30 in a number of countries, including Iceland, India, Lithuania, Romania, Switzerland and also Canada, Australia, and New Zealand, where it debuted in the top-ten. The song surpassed one billion streams on Spotify.

In France, although it failed to enter in the top 40 of the French Singles Chart, it reached number 77 and was certified platinum for 200,000 units sold by SNEP.

== Music video and live performance ==
To accompany its release, the Weeknd uploaded a music visualizer of the song on his YouTube, featuring a montage of clips and photos from the Cannes premiere of the series and the afterparty. On July 25, in order to further promote the song, the Weeknd uploaded a live performance of the song on YouTube. The Weeknd performed "Popular" for the second leg of his After Hours til Dawn Tour.

An official music video for the song premiered on February 15, 2024, exclusively on Fortnite. The video was filmed in August 2023, and features shots between the Weeknd dancing and drinking at Hatfield House, Madonna dancing and rolling around on a sofa in a high-rise apartment, Playboi Carti dancing around a Mercedes-Benz Maybach, and also additional scenes throughout Scotland such as the Dundas Castle. The video was released a week later on YouTube. On December 4, 2025, the video reached 100 million views on YouTube, making Madonna the first female artist in history, and second to Michael Jackson to have a music video achieve this feat in five different decades.

== Track listing ==
- Digital and streaming single
1. "Popular" – 3:35
2. "Popular" (sped up) – 3:07
3. "Popular" (slowed) – 4:18
4. "Popular" (instrumental) – 3:35
5. "Popular" (a cappella) – 3:35
- 7-inch vinyl
1. "One of the Girls" – 4:04
2. "Popular" – 3:35

== Charts ==
=== Weekly charts ===
Weekly chart performance
Chart (2023–2024)	Peak position
Argentina Anglo Airplay (Monitor Latino)	7
Australia (ARIA)	8
Australia Hip Hop/R&B (ARIA)	5
Austria (Ö3 Austria Top 40)	16
Belgium (Ultratop 50 Wallonia)	15
Bolivia Airplay (Monitor Latino)	12
Bulgaria Airplay (PROPHON)	2
Canada Hot 100 (Billboard)	10
Canada CHR/Top 40 (Billboard)	22
Canada Hot AC (Billboard)	32
CIS Airplay (TopHit)	106
Croatia International Airplay (Top lista)	3
Czech Republic Singles Digital (ČNS IFPI)	27
Denmark (Tracklisten)	17
Dominican Republic Anglo Airplay (Monitor Latino)	20
Ecuador Anglo Airplay (Monitor Latino)	11
El Salvador Anglo Airplay (Monitor Latino)	3
Estonia Airplay (TopHit)	21
Finland (Suomen virallinen lista)	50
France (SNEP)	77
Germany (GfK)	21
Global 200 (Billboard)	13
Greece International (IFPI)	2
Guatemala Anglo Airplay (Monitor Latino)	17
Honduras Anglo Airplay (Monitor Latino)	14
Hungary (Single Top 40)	26
Iceland (Tónlistinn)	9
India International (IMI)	3
Ireland (IRMA)	15
Israel (Mako Hitlist)	90
Italy (FIMI)	82
Japan Hot Overseas (Billboard Japan)	2
Latvia Airplay (LaIPA)	4
Latvia Streaming (LaIPA)	4
Lebanon (Lebanese Top 20)	3
Lithuania (AGATA)	12
Lithuania Airplay (TopHit)	55
Luxembourg (Billboard)	16
Middle East and North Africa (IFPI)	16
Mexico Anglo Airplay (Monitor Latino)	13
Netherlands (Single Top 100)	23
New Zealand (Recorded Music NZ)	6
Norway (VG-lista)	11
Paraguay Anglo Airplay (Monitor Latino)	11
Poland (Polish Streaming Top 100)	51
Portugal (AFP)	23
Romania (Billboard)	12
Singapore (RIAS)	28
Slovakia Singles Digital (ČNS IFPI)	5
South Korea BGM (Circle)	80
South Korea Download (Circle)	183
Suriname (Nationale Top 40)	35
Sweden (Sverigetopplistan)	27
Switzerland (Schweizer Hitparade)	11
Turkey International Airplay (Radiomonitor Türkiye)	1
United Arab Emirates (IFPI)	4
UK Singles (Official Charts)	10
US Billboard Hot 100	43
US Dance Airplay (Billboard)	33
US Hot R&B/Hip-Hop Songs (Billboard)	14
US Pop Airplay (Billboard)	14
US Rhythmic Airplay (Billboard)	7

=== Monthly charts ===
Monthly chart performance
Chart (2023)	Peak position
Czech Republic (Singles Digitál – Top 100)	37
Estonia Airplay (TopHit)	23
Latvia Airplay (TopHit)	81
Lithuania Airplay (TopHit)	68
Slovakia (Singles Digitál – Top 100)	6

=== Year-end charts ===
Year-end chart performance
Chart (2023)	Position
Australia (ARIA)	45
Belgium (Ultratop 50 Wallonia)	59
Canada (Canadian Hot 100)	58
Estonia Airplay (TopHit)	72
Germany (Official German Charts)	85
Global 200 (Billboard)	156
Lithuania Airplay (TopHit)	136
Switzerland (Schweizer Hitparade)	77
US Hot R&B/Hip-Hop Songs (Billboard)	39
US Mainstream Top 40 (Billboard)	48
US Rhythmic (Billboard)	28

Year-end chart performance
Chart (2024)	Position
Australia (ARIA)	82
Australia Hip Hop/R&B (ARIA)	14
Global 200 (Billboard)	126
India International (IMI)	13

== Certifications ==
Certifications
Region	Certification	Certified units/sales
Australia (ARIA)	3× Platinum	210,000^{‡}
Austria (IFPI Austria)	Platinum	30,000^{‡}
Belgium (BRMA)	Gold	20,000^{‡}
Brazil (Pro-Música Brasil)	Diamond	160,000^{‡}
Canada (Music Canada)	5× Platinum	400,000^{‡}
Denmark (IFPI Danmark)	Platinum	90,000^{‡}
France (SNEP)	Platinum	200,000^{‡}
Germany (BVMI)	Gold	300,000^{‡}
Italy (FIMI)	Platinum	100,000^{‡}
New Zealand (RMNZ)	3× Platinum	90,000^{‡}
Poland (ZPAV)	Platinum	50,000^{‡}
Portugal (AFP)	Platinum	10,000^{‡}
Spain (Promusicae)	Gold	30,000^{‡}
United Kingdom (BPI)	Platinum	600,000^{‡}
United States (RIAA)	Platinum	1,000,000^{‡}
Streaming
Central America (CFC)	Platinum	7,000,000^{†}
Czech Republic (ČNS IFPI)	Gold	2,500,000^{†}
Greece (IFPI Greece)	2× Platinum	4,000,000^{†}
Slovakia (ČNS IFPI)	Platinum	1,700,000^{†}
^{‡} Sales+streaming figures based on certification alone.^{†} Streaming-only figures based on certification alone.

== Release history ==
Release history
Region	Date	Format	Version(s)	Label	Ref.
Various	June 2, 2023	Digital download; streaming	Original	XO; Republic	
United States	June 6, 2023	Contemporary hit radio; rhythmic contemporary radio	Original	XO; Republic	
Various	January 26, 2024	Digital download; streaming	5-track single	XO; Republic	
United States	June 14, 2024	7-inch	Original	XO; Republic	
