= Double Fantasy (song) =

2023 single by the Weeknd featuring Future

Single by the Weeknd featuring Future

from the EP The Idol Episode 2 (Music from the HBO Original Series)
- Released: April 21, 2023
- Genre: Synth-pop; electronic-R&B; space pop; lo-fi
- Length: 4:28; 3:56 (radio edit)
- Label: XO; Republic
- Songwriters: Abel Tesfaye; Nayvadius Wilburn; Leland Wayne; Michael Dean
- Producers: The Weeknd; Metro Boomin; Mike Dean

The Weeknd singles chronology
| "Die for You" (remix) (2023) | "Double Fantasy" (2023) | "Popular" (2023) |

Future singles chronology
| "Private Landing" (2023) | "Double Fantasy" (2023) | "Arabi" (2024) |

Music video
- "Double Fantasy" on YouTube

"Double Fantasy" is a song by Canadian singer the Weeknd featuring American rapper Future. It was released on April 21, 2023, through XO and Republic Records, originally serving as the lead single to The Idol, Vol. 1, the now scrapped soundtrack album to the former's HBO drama television series, The Idol, which premiered on June 4, 2023. The song was later included on The Idol Episode 2 (Music from the HBO Original Series), an EP of music from the second episode of the series. The song was written by Future, the Weeknd, Metro Boomin, and Mike Dean, and produced by the latter three. It is named after John Lennon and Yoko Ono's 1980 studio album of the same name.

== Release and promotion ==
On April 10, 2023, the Weeknd previewed a snippet of "Double Fantasy" alongside an unreleased cover of John Lennon's 1971 single, "Jealous Guy", on Instagram Live. Four days later, he made an appearance at producer Metro Boomin's set at Coachella 2023, in which he performed his portion of the song, but he teased the song's title two days before. On April 19, 2023, he shared the cover art of the song and announced its release date. Two days later, the same day that the song was released, he performed it at Metro Boomin's second set at Coachella.

== Music video ==
The official music video for "Double Fantasy" was released alongside the release of the song on April 21, 2023. Future does not make an appearance in it, but it shares unreleased scenes from The Idol, and stars Tesfaye and co-star Lily-Rose Depp, looking for fame and then finding the former, while the video is sexually charged and is drug-heavy. It currently has over 100 million views on Youtube

== Critical reception ==
In a positive review for American Songwriter, Thomas Galindo praised the song writing: "With a stunning, multi-faceted chorus, The Weeknd's vocals and lyrics ooze promiscuity. Following along with the supposed theme of the show, which depicts the toxic, hyper-sexual nature of Hollywood, "Double Fantasy" feels like the perfect promotional track for The Idol Vol. 1." In a more mixed review for Pitchfork, Shaad D'Souza, wrote that the song was "luxuriously produced" and that it was "knowingly cheesy and sleazy". He commended Tesfaye's vocals for feeling effortless but criticized Future's verse as being "boilerplate" and his delivery "soporific".

== Track listing ==
"Double Fantasy" track listing
| No. | Title | Length |
|---|---|---|
| 1. | "Double Fantasy" (featuring Future) | 4:28 |
| 2. | "Double Fantasy" (featuring Future; radio edit) | 3:55 |

== Charts ==
=== Weekly charts ===
Weekly chart performance for "Double Fantasy"
| Chart (2023) | Peak position |
|---|---|
| Australia (ARIA) | 9 |
| Australia Hip Hop/R&B (ARIA) | 4 |
| Austria (Ö3 Austria Top 40) | 22 |
| Canada Hot 100 (Billboard) | 7 |
| Canada CHR/Top 40 (Billboard) | 24 |
| Czech Republic Singles Digital (ČNS IFPI) | 49 |
| Denmark (Tracklisten) | 18 |
| Finland (Suomen virallinen lista) | 30 |
| France (SNEP) | 34 |
| Germany (GfK) | 23 |
| Global 200 (Billboard) | 12 |
| Greece International (IFPI) | 1 |
| Hungary (Single Top 40) | 32 |
| Hungary (Stream Top 40) | 36 |
| Iceland (Tónlistinn) | 13 |
| Ireland (IRMA) | 13 |
| Italy (FIMI) | 68 |
| Japan Hot Overseas (Billboard Japan) | 8 |
| Latvia (LAIPA) | 7 |
| Lebanon (Lebanese Top 20) | 4 |
| Lithuania (AGATA) | 8 |
| Luxembourg (Billboard) | 7 |
| MENA (IFPI) | 14 |
| Netherlands (Single Top 100) | 38 |
| New Zealand (Recorded Music NZ) | 11 |
| Norway (VG-lista) | 18 |
| Poland (Polish Streaming Top 100) | 24 |
| Portugal (AFP) | 29 |
| Romania (Billboard) | 18 |
| Singapore (RIAS) | 17 |
| Slovakia Singles Digital (ČNS IFPI) | 35 |
| South Africa (Billboard) | 24 |
| South Korea BGM (Circle) | 106 |
| South Korea Download (Circle) | 179 |
| Sweden (Sverigetopplistan) | 18 |
| Switzerland (Schweizer Hitparade) | 9 |
| UK Singles (Official Charts) | 14 |
| UK Hip Hop/R&B (Official Charts) | 8 |
| US Billboard Hot 100 | 18 |
| US Hot R&B/Hip-Hop Songs (Billboard) | 8 |
| US Pop Airplay (Billboard) | 18 |
| US Rhythmic Airplay (Billboard) | 11 |
| Vietnam (Vietnam Hot 100) | 31 |

=== Year-end charts ===
Year-end chart performance for "Double Fantasy"
| Chart (2023) | Position |
|---|---|
| US Hot R&B/Hip-Hop Songs (Billboard) | 95 |

== Certifications ==
Certifications for "Double Fantasy"
| Region | Certification | Certified units/sales |
|---|---|---|
| Australia (ARIA) | Gold | 35,000^{‡} |
| Brazil (Pro-Música Brasil) | Platinum | 40,000^{‡} |
| Canada (Music Canada) | Platinum | 80,000^{‡} |
| New Zealand (RMNZ) | Gold | 15,000^{‡} |
^{‡} Sales+streaming figures based on certification alone.

== Release history ==
Release history for "Double Fantasy"
| Region | Date | Format | Label | Ref. |
|---|---|---|---|---|
| Various | April 21, 2023 | Digital download; streaming | XO; Republic | |
| United States | April 25, 2023 | Contemporary hit radio | XO; Republic | |
