= Comin Out Strong =

Song by Future featuring the Weeknd

from the album Hndrxx
- Released: February 24, 2017
- Length: 4:14
- Label: A1; Freebandz; Epic
- Songwriters: Nayvadius Wilburn; Abel Tesfaye; Kevin Vincent; Noel Fisher; Henry Walter; Ahmad Balshe
- Producers: High Klassified; Cirkut

"Comin Out Strong" is a song by American rapper Future, featuring Canadian singer the Weeknd, from his sixth studio album Hndrxx (2017). The artists co-wrote the song with Kevin Vincent, Noel Fisher, Henry Walter and Ahmad Balshe. It was produced by High Klassified and Cirkut. It is the fourth overall collaboration between the two artists.

Kodak Black called Future on a live Instagram feed in August 2017, asking about some unclear lyrics in the song. Future responded that the line is "I only feel alive when I take", as in taking pills.

== Music video ==
The music video for "Comin Out Strong" was released exclusively to Apple Music on June 5, 2017. It was shot in the abandoned Lower Bay Station in Toronto, Canada.

== Commercial performance ==
"Comin Out Strong'" peaked at number 48 on the Billboard Hot 100 on the date ending March 18, 2017. The song was certified Platinum by the Recording Industry Association of America (RIAA) for combined sales and streaming equivalent units of over 1,000,000 units in the United States.

== Charts ==
Chart (2017)	Peak position
Canada Hot 100 (Billboard)	43
France (SNEP)	82
UK Singles (OCC)	83
UK Hip Hop/R&B (OCC)	22
US Billboard Hot 100	48
US Hot R&B/Hip-Hop Songs (Billboard)	19

== Certifications ==
Region	Certification	Certified units/sales
New Zealand (RMNZ)	Gold	15,000^{‡}
United Kingdom (BPI)	Silver	200,000^{‡}
United States (RIAA)	Platinum	1,000,000^{‡}
^{‡} Sales+streaming figures based on certification alone.
