= Suzanna Son =

American actress (born 1995)

- Born: October 31, 1995 (age 30); Hamilton, Montana
- Education: Cornish College of the Arts
- Occupations: Actress, musician
- Years active: 2021–present
- Notable work: Red Rocket; The Idol; Fear Street: Prom Queen
- Spouse: Ana Bedayo (m. 2023)

Suzanna Son (born October 31, 1995) is an American actress and musician. She is primarily known for the roles of Strawberry in the 2021 film Red Rocket and Megan Rogers in the 2025 Netflix film Fear Street: Prom Queen. She has been nominated for a Gotham Award and an Independent Spirit Award.

== Early life and education ==
Suzanna Son was born in Hamilton, Montana, but grew up in rural Washington state. She attended Cornish College of the Arts in Seattle where she majored in classical music before changing her major to musical theatre. She dropped out during her second year.

== Career ==
In 2018, Son was approached by director Sean Baker outside a screening of Gus Van Sant's Don't Worry, He Won't Get Far on Foot at the Arclight Hollywood Cinema. Baker asked her to audition for his upcoming film but did not call her back for two years. The film, Red Rocket, was released in 2021 and features Son as a 17-year-old girl in East Texas who gets into a relationship with a former porn star, played by Simon Rex. The film was her first feature role; before that, Son had appeared in a "risqué" low-budget short film. Son was nominated for a Gotham Award for Best Breakthrough Performer and an Independent Spirit Award for Best Supporting Actress for the role.

Son has also released music recordings, chiefly through uploads to her YouTube channel. When Baker learned that she taught piano, he wrote a scene for her in the film in which she sings a slow ballad cover version of the NSYNC song "Bye Bye Bye". Son also performed an original song in case they were unable to secure the rights to the song, but all five members of NSYNC approved of the cover. Son's version was released on various music streaming services to promote the film.

In November 2021, Son joined the cast of the HBO music-industry drama series The Idol opposite The Weeknd and Lily-Rose Depp. On April 27, 2022, Deadline reported that she was one of the cast members not expected to return after a forced hiatus, due to a change in the show's creative direction, although Son appeared in the teaser trailer released on August 21, 2022. On March 1, 2023, Rolling Stone reported that Son remained in the cast despite the overhaul, but the show was canceled in August 2023.

In March 2024, Son was announced to be a starring character in the Netflix horror film Fear Street: Prom Queen.

In 2025, Son portrayed Adeline Watkins in Monster: The Ed Gein Story alongside Charlie Hunnam as Ed Gein.

== Personal life ==
Son is a lesbian. In April 2023, she married her girlfriend Ana Bedayo, who also works as Suzanna's talent manager.

== Filmography ==
=== Film ===
Key
†	Denotes films that have not yet been released

Year	Title	Role	Notes
2021	Red Rocket	Strawberry / Raylee	
2025	Fear Street: Prom Queen	Megan Rogers	
TBA	Untitled Arkasha Stevenson film		Post-production

=== Television ===
Year	Title	Role	Notes
2023	The Idol	Chloe	5 episodes
2025	Monster: The Ed Gein Story	Adeline Watkins	6 episodes

=== Music videos ===
Year	Title	Artist	Ref.
2024	"Lithonia"	Childish Gambino	
2024	"Skin"	August Ponthier	
