= The Idol (TV series) =

2023 American drama television series

- Genre: Drama
- Created by: Sam Levinson; Abel Tesfaye; Reza Fahim
- Teleplay by: Sam Levinson
- Directed by: Sam Levinson
- Starring: Abel Tesfaye; Lily-Rose Depp; Suzanna Son; Troye Sivan; Jane Adams
- Music by: The Weeknd; Mike Dean; Sam Levinson; Kim Jennie
- Country of origin: United States
- Original language: English
- No. of seasons: 1
- No. of episodes: 5

Production
- Executive producers: Sam Levinson; Abel Tesfaye; Reza Fahim; Kevin Turen; Ashley Levinson; Sara E. White; Joe Epstein; Aaron Gilbert
- Producer: Harrison Kreiss
- Production locations: Los Angeles, California
- Cinematography: Marcell Rév; Arseni Khachaturan; Drew Daniels
- Editors: Julio C. Perez IV; Aaron I. Butler; Aleshka Ferrero; Julie Cohen
- Running time: 45–65 minutes
- Production companies: The Reasonable Bunch; Manic Phase; Tiny Goat; People Pleaser; Bron; A24; HBO Entertainment

Original release
- Network: HBO
- Release: June 4 – July 2, 2023

Related
- Euphoria

The Idol is an American drama television series created by Sam Levinson, Abel "The Weeknd" Tesfaye, and Reza Fahim for HBO. The series focuses on female pop idol Jocelyn (Lily-Rose Depp) and her complex relationship with Tedros (Tesfaye), a sleazy nightclub owner, self-help guru, and cult leader. Appearing in supporting roles are Suzanna Son, Troye Sivan, Jane Adams, Jennie Ruby Jane, Rachel Sennott, Hari Nef, Moses Sumney, Da'Vine Joy Randolph, Eli Roth, Ramsey, and Hank Azaria.

The Idol underwent significant creative changes during filming, with Levinson taking over directing duties from original director Amy Seimetz and reshaping the series to align with a new vision. This included a shift away from the initial story line towards a focus on a "degrading" love story with heavier sexual content. Production was paused and resumed several times, with scenes filmed during Tesfaye's tour. The series was shot using improvisation and featured scenes filmed at Tesfaye's mansion.

It premiered its first two episodes at the 76th Cannes Film Festival in May 2023. The series aired on HBO and Max from June 4 to July 2, 2023. The series was widely panned upon release and was canceled after one season in August 2023.

== Synopsis ==
Jocelyn is a pop idol who resolves to reclaim her title as the sexiest pop star in the United States after her last tour was canceled following a nervous breakdown. She begins a complex relationship with Tedros, a self-help guru and the head of a contemporary cult.

== Cast and characters ==
=== Main ===
- Lily-Rose Depp as Jocelyn, an up-and-coming young pop star reeling from the death of her mother
- Abel Tesfaye as Tedros, a sinister nightclub owner and talent scout leading a cult-like group of aspiring musicians
- Suzanna Son as Chloe, a young aspiring musician loyal to Tedros
- Troye Sivan as Xander, Jocelyn's creative director and childhood friend
- Jane Adams as Nikki Katz, a cynical record label executive

=== Recurring ===
- Jennie Ruby Jane as Dyanne, a backup dancer and close friend of Jocelyn
- Rachel Sennott as Leia, Jocelyn's best friend and assistant
- Hari Nef as Talia Hirsch, a Vanity Fair writer looking to write an article on Jocelyn's mental state
- Moses Sumney as Izaak, a follower of Tedros
- Da'Vine Joy Randolph as Destiny, Jocelyn's co-manager
- Ramsey as herself, a follower of Tedros
- Hank Azaria as Chaim, Jocelyn's other co-manager

=== Guest ===
- Dan Levy as Benjamin, Jocelyn's publicist
- Eli Roth as Andrew Finkelstein, a Live Nation representative
- Alexa Demie (uncredited cameo)
- Melanie Liburd as Jenna, a follower of Tedros
- Mike Dean as himself, hired by Tedros to produce Jocelyn's new album
- Karl Glusman as Rob Turner, an actor and Jocelyn's ex-boyfriend

== Episodes ==
| No. | Title | Directed by | Written by | Original release date | U.S. viewers (millions) |
|---|---|---|---|---|---|
| 1 | "Pop Tarts & Rat Tales" | Sam Levinson | Teleplay by : Sam Levinson; Story by : Abel Tesfaye, Reza Fahim & Sam Levinson | June 4, 2023 | 0.232 |
After her last tour was canceled due to a nervous breakdown, pop music singer Jocelyn prepares for the release of her comeback single—shooting the cover art, practicing the choreography, and being profiled by Vanity Fair writer Talia. Unbeknownst to her, a lewd selfie of Jocelyn is leaked onto the Internet and her team—including managers Chaim and Destiny, record label executive Nikki, Live Nation representative Andrew, and publicist Benjamin—coordinates a response to maintain her reputation. Later, Jocelyn attends a nightclub with her best friend and assistant Leia, creative director Xander, and backup dancer Dyanne, where she meets the owner Tedros, with whom she instantly connects. To Leia's chagrin, Jocelyn invites Tedros to her house. Playing her new song "World Class Sinner", Jocelyn and Tedros question its authenticity, in which Tedros initiates BDSM foreplay.
| 2 | "Double Fantasy" | Sam Levinson | Teleplay by : Sam Levinson; Story by : Abel Tesfaye & Sam Levinson | June 11, 2023 | 0.135 |
After reworking the song with Tedros, Jocelyn plays a remixed version of "World Class Sinner" to her team, which receives mixed responses. Nikki adamantly opposes it and berates Jocelyn. At the music video shoot, Jocelyn overexerts herself to perfect the choreography, angering the director. Meanwhile, Leia builds a closer relationship with Izaak—a musician linked to Tedros—while Chaim and Destiny look into Tedros's past, and Nikki sees potential in Dyanne, who is revealed to be one of Tedros's followers. The video is scrapped after Jocelyn breaks down and calls out for her deceased mother. Later, Tedros is invited to Jocelyn's home, bringing with him Izaak and Chloe, a singer and a young pianist. Leia is wary of Jocelyn's relationship with Tedros.
| 3 | "Daybreak" | Sam Levinson | Teleplay by : Sam Levinson; Story by : Abel Tesfaye & Sam Levinson | June 18, 2023 | 0.133 |
Tedros begins asserting more control over Jocelyn's life, moving into her mansion alongside the rest of his entourage. His erratic, domineering behavior worries Leia. Jocelyn's managers are alarmed to learn she is scrapping her album and starting anew in a different creative direction, but Tedros allays their concerns when he announces that he has enlisted Mike Dean to produce Jocelyn's new music. Jocelyn grows closer to Tedros's group, which is increasingly shown to be a cult. At Tedros's urging, Jocelyn reveals to the group during dinner that her mother emotionally and physically abused her, with Xander, her childhood friend, doing little to intervene. Tedros encourages Jocelyn to channel her trauma into her art and performs a bondage session on her using the same hairbrush with which her mother would beat her.
| 4 | "Stars Belong to the World" | Sam Levinson | Teleplay by : Sam Levinson; Story by : Abel Tesfaye & Sam Levinson | June 25, 2023 | 0.133 |
Destiny runs a background check on Tedros and learns that his real name is Mauricio Costello Jackson, and is trailing a string of domestic abuse charges. Concerned for Jocelyn's wellbeing, Destiny visits the house to learn more about Tedros's group and Chloe slips up revealing that she is possibly only 17; while she is put off by his dynamic with Jocelyn, she is eventually impressed by the results in her new music. Xander reveals to Tedros that Jocelyn's mother outed him as a teenager and made him sign a contract forbidding him from pursuing a music career. In response, Tedros tortures Xander with a shock collar in front of Jocelyn until Xander recants his accusations. Izaak later tends to Xander's injuries. Jocelyn learns Dyanne recruited her into Tedros's group and has since been offered a record deal with her label; to get back at Tedros, Jocelyn invites her ex-boyfriend Rob to the house and has sex with him within Tedros's earshot. Xander, now loyal to Tedros, tricks Rob into posing for suggestive photos with Sophie, one of Tedros's followers.
| 5 | "Jocelyn Forever" | Sam Levinson | Teleplay by : Sam Levinson; Story by : Abel Tesfaye & Sam Levinson | July 2, 2023 | 0.185 |
Jocelyn accuses Tedros of being a con man and a fraud, claiming that he had been obsessed with her even before they met. Despite this, Tedros remains at Jocelyn's estate and accompanies her to a meeting with her record label. During the meeting, it is revealed that Rob is being accused of raping Sophie. Frustrated with Tedros's behavior, Jocelyn convinces Chaim to remove him from their lives by offering him $500,000, which Tedros refuses. Chaim arranges for Talia to expose Tedros as a serial pimp, leading to his reputation being ruined while facing investigations by the IRS. However, Tedros attends Jocelyn's opening night of her tour, where she unexpectedly expresses her longing for him and confesses that fame and success mean less without him. Backstage, Tedros notices a new hairbrush despite Jocelyn previously telling him about her late mother's abusive actions. Jocelyn then brings Tedros on stage during her concert, declaring him the love of her life and they share a kiss.

== Production ==
=== Development ===
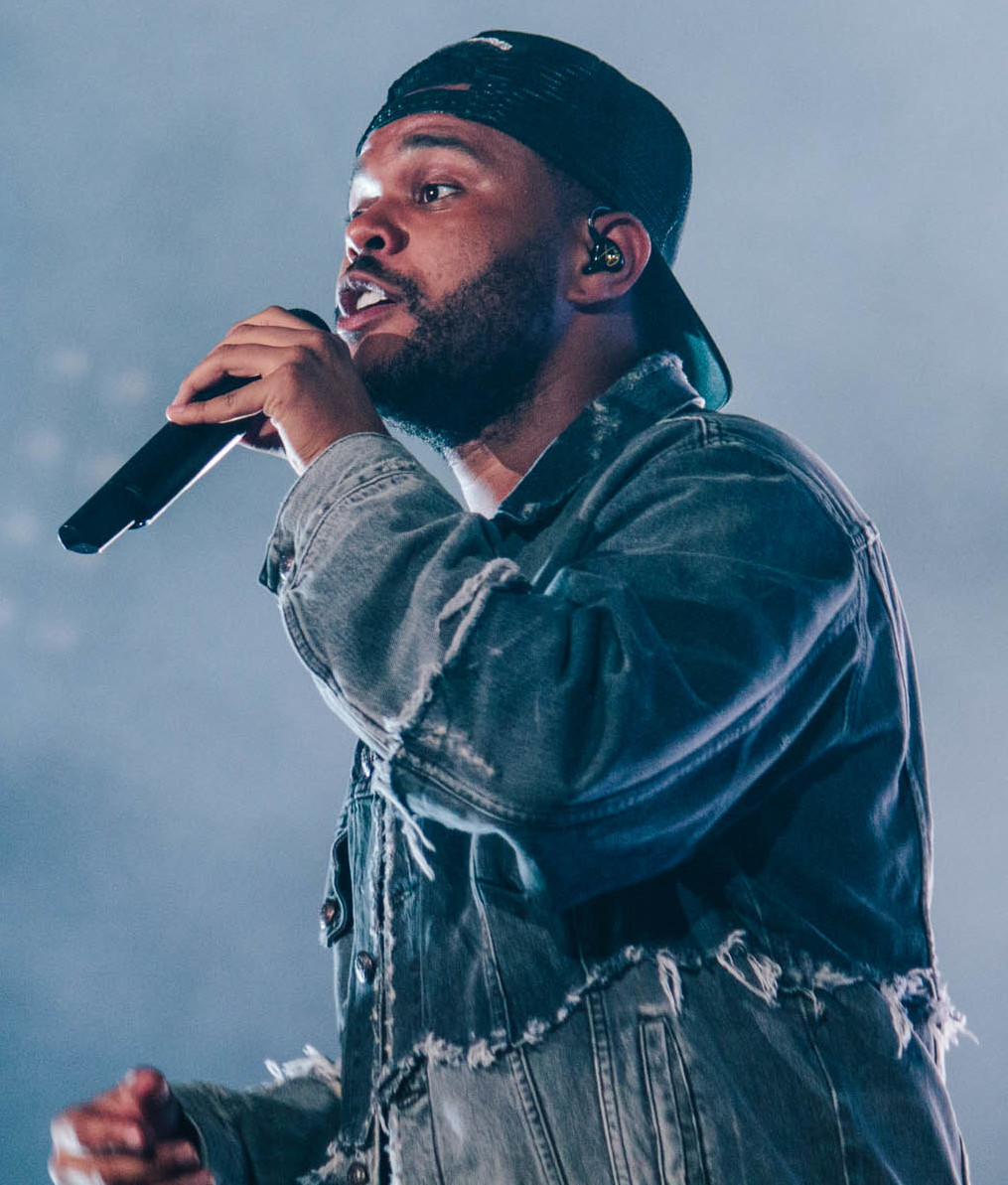
Abel "The Weeknd" Tesfaye, The Idol's showrunner and co-star.

On June 29, 2021, Tesfaye announced that he would be creating, executive producing, and co-writing a drama series for HBO alongside Reza Fahim and Sam Levinson. On the same day, Ashley Levinson and Joseph Epstein were announced as executive producers for the series, with Epstein also serving as a writer and the series' showrunner. Mary Laws was also announced as a writer and a co-executive producer, alongside Tesfaye's co-manager Wassim Slaiby and his creative director La Mar Taylor. Amy Seimetz was signed on as the director and as an executive producer.

On November 22, 2021, HBO gave the production a series order for a first season consisting of six episodes. Following a creative overhaul in the spring of 2022, the season was condensed to five episodes. On January 14, 2022, Deadline Hollywood reported that Nick Hall had joined the production as an executive producer, following his move to A24 to oversee creative for the company's television slate. On August 28, 2023, HBO announced that The Idol was canceled after one season.

=== Casting ===
In the initial announcement, Tesfaye revealed that he would be starring in the series. On September 29, 2021, it was reported that Lily-Rose Depp had signed on to play the female lead opposite Tesfaye. On November 22, Suzanna Son, Steve Zissis, and Troye Sivan joined the main cast, while Melanie Liburd, Tunde Adebimpe, Elizabeth Berkley, Nico Hiraga, and Anne Heche were announced as recurring characters. On December 2, Juliebeth Gonzalez joined the cast as a series regular, while Maya Eshet, Tyson Ritter, Kate Lyn Sheil, Liz Caribel Sierra, and Finley Rose Slater were cast in recurring roles.

On April 25, 2022, Variety reported that the show was set to undergo a major overhaul, with "drastic" changes in the cast and creative directions. On April 27, Deadline Hollywood reported that Son, Zissis, and Gonzalez were not expected to return. In July, actors Rachel Sennott and Hari Nef, along with Jennie Ruby Jane, joined the cast; Moses Sumney, Jane Adams, Dan Levy, Eli Roth, Da'Vine Joy Randolph, Mike Dean, Ramsey, and Hank Azaria were confirmed as cast members on August 21 in the second teaser trailer. On March 1, 2023, Rolling Stone reported that Son and Sivan remained in the cast despite the overhaul. It was later announced that Heche (in what would have been her final television role) and Berkley were no longer in the cast as HBO took the series in "a new creative direction".

=== Filming ===
Principal photography began in November 2021 in and around Los Angeles, California. Production was temporarily paused in April 2022 due to Tesfaye co-headlining the Coachella Valley Music and Arts Festival with Swedish House Mafia on short notice. On April 25, Variety reported that Seimetz had left the project amid its creative overhaul, with roughly 80% of the series already filmed. HBO released a statement following Seimetz's exit, saying: "The Idol's creative team continues to build, refine, and evolve their vision for the show and they have aligned on a new creative direction. The production will be adjusting its cast and crew accordingly to best serve this new approach to the series".

Levinson reportedly took over Seimetz's directing duties sometime in April 2022. According to anonymous sources quoted in Deadline Hollywood, Tesfaye wanted to tone down the "cult" aspect of the story and felt that Seimetz's work leaned too much into the "female perspective" of co-star Lily Rose Depp's character, rather than his own. Reporting by Rolling Stone noted the marked differences between Seimetz's initial work and Levinson's reshooting and rewriting of the series, which scrapped Seimetz's initial approach—a troubled starlet falling victim to a predatory industry figure and fighting to reclaim her own agency. Crew members described the Levinson rework's focus on a "degrading" love story, with a heavier emphasis on sexual content and nudity, as amounting to "sexual torture porn" and "like [a] rape fantasy".

Production resumed in late May 2022 and was paused again in early July, just as Tesfaye began embarking on his After Hours til Dawn Tour. Scenes from The Idol were filmed in September at SoFi Stadium in Inglewood, California, during Tesfaye's tour. Audience members were notified of the filming before the concert commenced.

The series was shot using two to three cameras, with the cast improvising, leaving the editors with long first cuts. The series used Tesfaye's Bel Air mansion as Jocelyn's home.

== Music ==
The series' soundtrack, The Idol, Vol. 1, was originally set to be released on June 30. The soundtrack was set to include songs created by the Weeknd himself and supporting cast member Mike Dean, among others. "Double Fantasy", featuring Future, was released as the lead single from the soundtrack on April 21, 2023. "Popular", a collaboration with Playboi Carti and Madonna, was released as the second single from the soundtrack on June 2, 2023. On June 8, 2023, it was announced that new music was set to be released following or preceding the premiere of each episode in an EP format, abandoning the soundtrack format altogether. "One of the Girls", a collaboration with Jennie and Lily-Rose Depp, was later released a single on December 8, 2023.

== Release ==
The Idol premiered out-of-competition at the 76th Cannes Film Festival on May 22, 2023, where the series received a five-minute standing ovation following the screening of its first two episodes, which is considered a normal to lukewarm audience reaction at the festival. This is also where Sam Levinson announced that the show was taking place in the same universe as his other HBO series, Euphoria. It marks the fifth television series to be screened at the festival after Carlos, Too Old to Die Young, Twin Peaks, and Irma Vep. The series began airing on HBO and Max on June 4, 2023.

== Reception ==
=== Critical response ===
The Idol was panned by critics, who decried its writing, directing, themes and performances (particularly that of Tesfaye), with some deeming it "boring". Critics who attended the series' premiere at the Cannes Film Festival disapproved of its script, direction, and sexual content. On the review aggregator website Rotten Tomatoes, the series holds a rating of 18% based on 105 critic reviews, with an average rating of 4.10/10. The site's consensus reads: "Every bit as florid and sleazy as the industry it seeks to satirize, The Idol places itself on a pedestal with unbridled style but wilts under the spotlight". On Metacritic, which assigns a weighted average, the series holds a score of 27 out of 100, based on 24 reviews, indicating "generally unfavorable reviews".

Leila Latif of The Guardian and Ed Power of The Daily Telegraph respectively described The Idol as "one of the worst programmes ever made" and "the worst TV show of the year". David Fear of Rolling Stone slammed the first two episodes as "nasty, brutish, much longer than it is, and way, way worse than you'd have anticipated", lamenting that the series "has mistaken misery for profundity, stock perversity for envelope-pushing, crude caricatures for sharp satire, toxicity for complexity, nipple shots for screen presence". Levinson's screenwriting was criticized by The Daily Beast's Fletcher Peters as clichéd.

In his review of the first two episodes for Vanity Fair, Richard Lawson described The Idol as "a tawdry tale of sex gone scary, dressed up in the visual vernacular of TV's wunderkind du jour" that "offers up enough regular old entertainment to balance out [Levinson's] aggressive flourish and the bluster of his thematic ambitions". Remarking that "in trying so hard to be transgressive, the show ultimately becomes regressive", Lovia Gyarke of The Hollywood Reporter observed that the series "shows glimmers of potential when it stops trying so hard to be shocking". Writing for Vogue, Douglas Greenwood deemed it "a gorgeous-looking horror show" and "buzzy, brazen television that will do exactly what it set out to do: get people talking". A review from Alex Barasch in The New Yorker considered the series to be "a stylishly shot, faintly sordid project".

Jason Gorber of RogerEbert.com panned Tesfaye's performance as "turgid" and "terrible", while Stephen Rodrick of Variety considered Tesfaye lacking in the charisma described by the series' publicity materials, "trying to play louche but just [coming] off, as one character describes him, 'rapey.'" Mikael Wood of the Los Angeles Times criticized his "painful line readings and his laughable facial expressions". The New York Times's James Poniewozik wrote that Tesfaye's performance was "flat, except when he overcorrects into outbursts" and called Depp "a watchable screen presence" while criticizing her singing ability.

=== Accolades ===
| Award / Film Festival | Date of ceremony | Category | Recipient(s) | Result | Ref(s) |
|---|---|---|---|---|---|
| Guild of Music Supervisors Awards | March 5, 2023 | Best Music Supervision in a Trailer – Series | Scenery Sumandra, Gregory Sweeney – Official Teaser #3 | Nominated | |
| Cannes Film Festival | May 27, 2023 | Queer Palm | Sam Levinson | Nominated | |
| Make-Up Artists and Hair Stylists Guild | February 18, 2024 | Best Contemporary Make-Up in a Television Series, Limited, Miniseries, or Movie for Television | Kirsten Sage Coleman, Mandy Artusato, Jessie Bishop, Erin Blinn | Won | |
| Make-Up Artists and Hair Stylists Guild | February 18, 2024 | Best Contemporary Hair Styling in a Television Series, Limited, Miniseries, or Movie for Television | Christopher Fulton, Gloria Conrad, Kamaura Eley, Kya Bilal | Nominated | |
| Primetime Emmy Awards | September 7–8, 2024 | Outstanding Choreography for Scripted Programming | Nina McNeely – Routines: Rehearsal / Music Video Shoot / Dollhouse | Won | |
