= List of awards and nominations received by the Weeknd =

The Weeknd awards and nominations
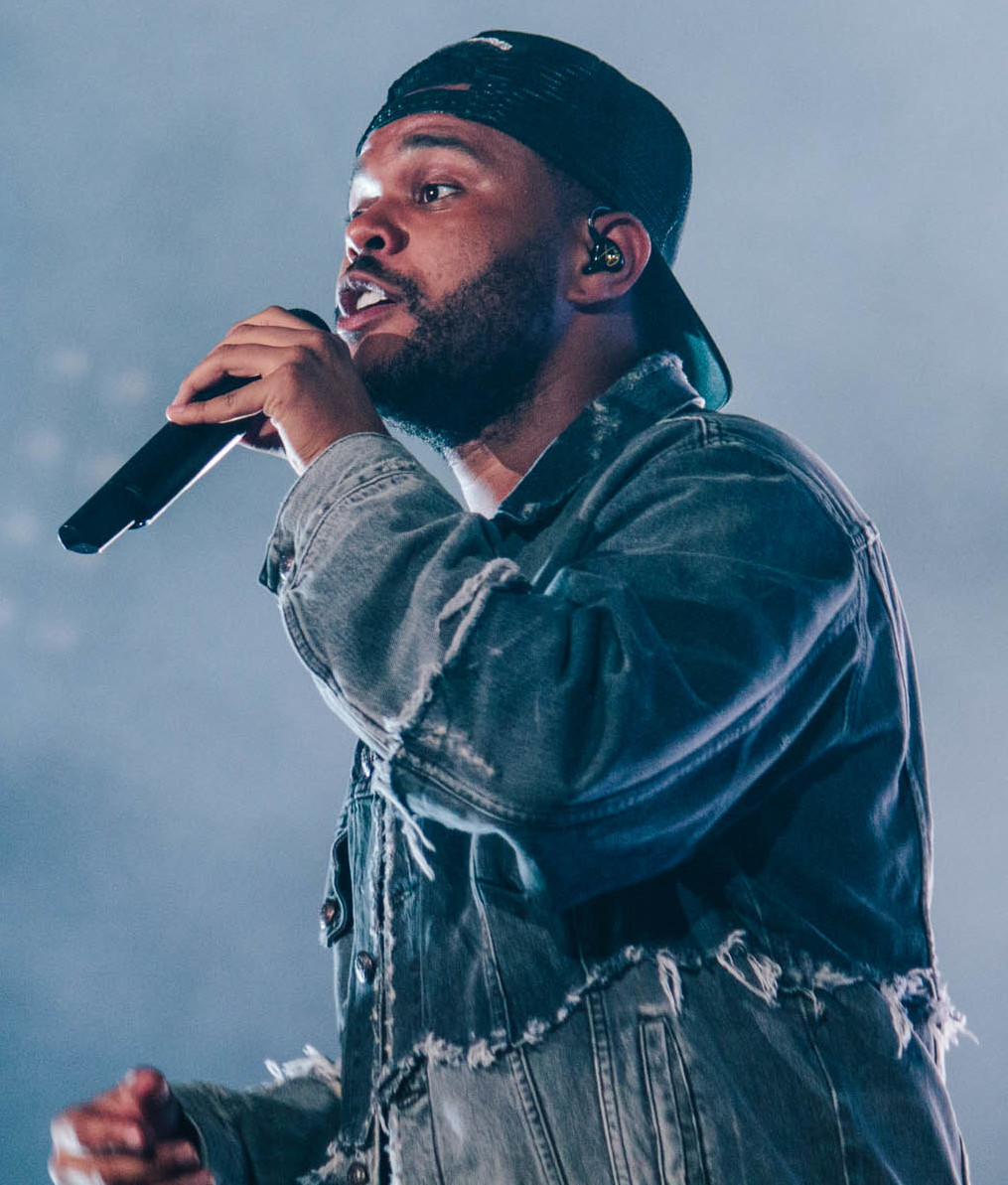
- The Weeknd at the FEQ, July 2018
Awards and nominations
Award	Wins	Nominations
Academy Awards	0	1
American Music Awards	6	24
AMFT Awards	7	7
Apple Music Awards	1	1
ARIA Music Awards	0	2
BET Awards	1	17
Billboard Music Awards	20	75
BRIT Awards	1	4
Grammy Awards	4	14
Guinness World Records	4	4
iHeartRadio MMVAs	5	21
iHeartRadio Music Awards	7	24
Juno Awards	22	41
Latin Grammy Awards	1	3
MTV Europe Music Awards	1	14
MTV Video Music Awards	3	25
NAACP Image Awards	0	4
People's Choice Awards	1	5
Primetime Emmy Awards	0	1
Teen Choice Awards	0	7

Totals (Note: Certain award groups do not simply award one winner. They acknowledge several different recipients, have runners-up, and have third place. Since this is a specific recognition and is different from losing an award, runner-up mentions are considered wins in this award tally. For simplification and to avoid errors, each award in this list has been presumed to have had a prior nomination.)
- Wins: 176
- Nominations: 519

The following list contains awards and nominations received by Canadian singer and songwriter the Weeknd.

After co-founding the XO record label in 2011, he rose to prominence following the release of his critically acclaimed mixtapes, House of Balloons, Thursday, and Echoes of Silence. House of Balloons was one of the ten shortlisted nominees for the 2011 Polaris Music Prize, while Echoes of Silence was a longlisted nominee for the 2012 Polaris Music Prize.

In 2012, the Weeknd signed with Republic Records and re-released his three mixtapes in the compilation album, Trilogy (2012). His debut studio album, Kiss Land (2013), was released to generally positive reviews. For the single "Earned It" from the soundtrack to the film, Fifty Shades of Grey (2015), the Weeknd received a nomination for the Academy Award for Best Original Song, and won the Grammy Award for Best R&B Performance. He gained major critical and commercial success with his second studio album, Beauty Behind the Madness (2015), which won the Grammy Award for Best Urban Contemporary Album, and received a nomination for Album of the Year. He won a second Grammy Award for Best Urban Contemporary Album in 2018 for his third studio album, Starboy (2016). His 2021 Super Bowl Halftime performance earned him a Primetime Emmy Award nomination for Outstanding Variety Special (Live).

His other accolades include an additional two Grammy Awards, twenty-two Billboard Music Awards, twenty-two Juno Awards, six American Music Awards, and five Guinness World Records.

== Awards and nominations ==
Name of the award ceremony, year presented, recipient of the award, category and result
Award	Year (Note: Indicates the year of ceremony. Each year is linked to the article about the awards held that year, wherever possible.)	Recipient(s)	Category	Result	Ref.
Academy Awards	2016	"Earned It"	Best Original Song	Nominated	
American Music Awards	2015	"Can't Feel My Face"	Single of the Year	Nominated	
American Music Awards	2015	Beauty Behind the Madness	Favorite Soul/R&B Album	Won	
American Music Awards	2015	Himself	New Artist of the Year	Nominated	
American Music Awards	2015	Himself	Favorite Soul/R&B Male Artist	Won	
American Music Awards	2016	Himself	Favorite Soul/R&B Male Artist	Nominated	
American Music Awards	2016	Himself	Favorite Pop/Rock Male Artist	Nominated	
American Music Awards	2017	Himself	Favorite Soul/R&B Male Artist	Nominated	
American Music Awards	2017	Starboy	Favorite Pop/Rock Album	Nominated	
American Music Awards	2017	Starboy	Favorite Soul/R&B Album	Nominated	
American Music Awards	2017	"Starboy" (featuring Daft Punk)	Favorite Soul/R&B Song	Nominated	
American Music Awards	2017	"Starboy" (featuring Daft Punk)	Collaboration of the Year	Nominated	
American Music Awards	2018	Himself	Favorite Male Artist – Soul/R&B	Nominated	
American Music Awards	2020	Himself	Favorite Male Artist – Soul/R&B	Won	
American Music Awards	2020	Himself	Favorite Male Artist – Pop/Rock	Nominated	
American Music Awards	2020	Himself	Artist of the Year	Nominated	
American Music Awards	2020	"Heartless"	Favorite Song – Soul/R&B	Won	
American Music Awards	2020	"Blinding Lights"	Favorite Music Video	Nominated	
American Music Awards	2020	"Blinding Lights"	Favorite Song – Pop/Rock	Nominated	
American Music Awards	2020	After Hours	Favorite Album – Soul/R&B	Won	
American Music Awards	2020	After Hours	Favorite Album – Pop/Rock	Nominated	
American Music Awards	2021	Himself	Artist of the Year	Nominated	
American Music Awards	2021	Himself	Favorite Male Pop Artist	Nominated	
American Music Awards	2021	Himself	Favorite Male R&B Artist	Won	
American Music Awards	2021	"Save Your Tears"	Favorite Music Video	Nominated	
American Music Awards	2021	"Save Your Tears (Remix)" (with Ariana Grande)	Favorite Pop Song	Nominated	
American Music Awards	2021	"Hawái (Remix)" (with Maluma)	Favorite Latin Song	Nominated	
American Music Awards	2022	Himself	Artist of the Year	Nominated	
American Music Awards	2022	Himself	Favorite Male Pop Artist	Nominated	
American Music Awards	2022	Himself	Favorite Male R&B Artist	Nominated	
American Music Awards	2022	Dawn FM	Favorite R&B Album	Nominated	
American Music Awards	2025	"Timeless" (with Playboi Carti)	Favorite R&B Song	Nominated	
American Music Awards	2025	Hurry Up Tomorrow	Favortie R&B Album	Won	
American Music Awards	2025	Himself	Favorite Male Pop Artist	Nominated	
American Music Awards	2025	Himself	Favorite Male R&B Artist	Won	
American Music Awards	2026	"Rather Lie" (with Playboi Carti)	Best Hip-Hop Song	Nominated	
American Music Awards	2026	Himself	Favorite Male R&B Artist	Nominated	
AMFT Awards	2020	"Blinding Lights"	Song of the Year	Won	
AMFT Awards	2020	"Blinding Lights"	Record of the Year	Won	
AMFT Awards	2020	"Blinding Lights"	Video of the Year	Won	
AMFT Awards	2020	"Blinding Lights"	Best R&B Song	Won	
AMFT Awards	2020	After Hours	Best Contemporary R&B Album	Won	
Apple Music Awards	2021	Himself	Global Artist of the Year	Won	
ARIA Music Awards	2016	Himself	Best International Artist	Nominated	
ARIA Music Awards	2020	Himself	Best International Artist	Nominated	
ASCAP Pop Music Awards	2016	"Can't Feel My Face"	Award Winning Songs	Won	
ASCAP Pop Music Awards	2016	"Earned It"	Award Winning Songs	Won	
ASCAP Pop Music Awards	2016	"The Hills"	Award Winning Songs	Won	
ASCAP Pop Music Awards	2016	"Love Me Harder"	Award Winning Songs	Won	
ASCAP Pop Music Awards	2017	"In the Night"	Award Winning Songs	Won	
ASCAP Pop Music Awards	2017	"Starboy" (featuring Daft Punk)	Award Winning Songs	Won	
ASCAP Pop Music Awards	2018	"I Feel It Coming (featuring Daft Punk)	Award Winning Songs	Won	
ASCAP Pop Music Awards	2018	"Starboy" (featuring Daft Punk)	Award Winning Songs	Won	
ASCAP Pop Music Awards	2018	"Unforgettable"	Award Winning Songs	Won	
ASCAP Pop Music Awards	2019	"Pray for Me" (with Kendrick Lamar)	Award Winning Songs	Won	
ASCAP Pop Music Awards	2021	"Heartless"	Award Winning Songs	Won	
ASCAP Pop Music Awards	2021	"Blinding Lights"	Award Winning Songs	Won	
ASCAP Pop Music Awards	2021	Himself	Songwriter of the Year	Won	
ASCAP Pop Music Awards	2022	"Save Your Tears"	Winning Songwriters & Publishers	Won	
ASCAP Rhythm & Soul Music Awards	2016	"Earned It"	Top R&B/Hip-Hop Song	Won	
ASCAP Rhythm & Soul Music Awards	2016	"The Hills"	Award Winning R&B/Hip-Hop and Rap Songs	Won	
ASCAP Rhythm & Soul Music Awards	2017	"The Hills"	Award-Winning R&B/Hip-Hop Songs	Won	
ASCAP Rhythm & Soul Music Awards	2017	"Low Life"	Award-Winning R&B/Hip-Hop Songs	Won	
ASCAP Rhythm & Soul Music Awards	2018	"Unforgettable"	Winning R&B/Hip-Hop & Rap Songs	Won	
ASCAP Rhythm & Soul Music Awards	2018	"Unforgettable"	Award Winning Rap Songs	Won	
ASCAP Rhythm & Soul Music Awards	2021	"Blinding Lights"	Award Winning R&B/Hip-Hop Songs	Won	
ASCAP Rhythm & Soul Music Awards	2021	"Heartless"	Award Winning R&B/Hip-Hop Songs	Won	
BBC Music Awards	2015	Himself	International Artist of the Year	Nominated	
BBC Music Awards	2015	"Can't Feel My Face"	Song of the Year	Nominated	
Berlin Music Video Awards	2021	"Save Your Tears"	Best Concept	Nominated	
Berlin Music Video Awards	2022	"Gasoline"	Best Cinematography	Nominated	
Berlin Music Video Awards	2022	"You Right" (with Doja Cat)	Best VFX	Nominated	
Berlin Music Video Awards	2025	"There Are Three Chapters In This Tale"	Best Animation	Nominated	
Berlin Music Video Awards	2026	São Paulo (with Anitta)	Most Bizarre	Nominated	
BET Awards	2013	Himself	Best New Artist	Nominated	
BET Awards	2015	Himself	Best Male R&B/Pop Artist	Nominated	
BET Awards	2015	"Earned It"	Centric Award	Won	
BET Awards	2015	"Earned It"	Viewers' Choice Award	Nominated	
BET Awards	2016	Himself	Best Male R&B/Pop Artist	Nominated	
BET Awards	2017	"Starboy" (featuring Daft Punk)	Viewers' Choice Award	Nominated	
BET Awards	2017	Himself	Best Male R&B/Pop Artist	Nominated	
BET Awards	2018	Himself	Best Male R&B/Pop Artist	Nominated	
BET Awards	2020	Himself	Best Male R&B/Pop Artist	Nominated	
BET Awards	2020	"Heartless"	Viewer's Choice Award	Nominated	
BET Awards	2021	After Hours	Album of the Year	Nominated	
BET Awards	2021	Himself	Best Male R&B/Pop Artist	Nominated	
BET Awards	2022	Himself	Best Male R&B/Pop Artist	Won	
BET Awards	2023	"Creepin'" (with Metro Boomin & 21 Savage)	Best Collaboration	Nominated	
BET Awards	2023	Himself	Best Male R&B/Pop Artist	Nominated	
BET Awards	2025	Hurry Up Tomorrow	Album of the Year	Nominated	
BET Awards	2025	"Timeless"	Video of the Year	Nominated	
BET Awards	2025	"Timeless"	Best Collaboration	Nominated	
BET Awards	2025	Himself	Best Male R&B/Pop Artist	Nominated	
Billboard Music Awards	2016	Himself	Top Artist	Nominated	
Billboard Music Awards	2016	Himself	Top Male Artist	Nominated	
Billboard Music Awards	2016	Himself	Top Billboard 200 Artist	Nominated	
Billboard Music Awards	2016	Himself	Top Hot 100 Artist	Won	
Billboard Music Awards	2016	Himself	Top Song Sales Artist	Won	
Billboard Music Awards	2016	Himself	Top Radio Songs Artist	Won	
Billboard Music Awards	2016	Himself	Top Streaming Songs Artist	Won	
Billboard Music Awards	2016	Himself	Top R&B Artist	Won	
Billboard Music Awards	2016	Himself	Billboard Chart Achievement	Nominated	
Billboard Music Awards	2016	Beauty Behind the Madness	Top Billboard 200 Album	Nominated	
Billboard Music Awards	2016	Beauty Behind the Madness	Top R&B Album	Won	
Billboard Music Awards	2016	"The Hills"	Top Selling Song	Nominated	
Billboard Music Awards	2016	"The Hills"	Top Streaming Song (Audio)	Won	
Billboard Music Awards	2016	"The Hills"	Top Streaming Song (Video)	Nominated	
Billboard Music Awards	2016	"The Hills"	Top R&B Song	Won	
Billboard Music Awards	2016	"Earned It"	Top R&B Song	Nominated	
Billboard Music Awards	2016	"Can't Feel My Face"	Top R&B Song	Nominated	
Billboard Music Awards	2016	"Can't Feel My Face"	Top Hot 100 Song	Nominated	
Billboard Music Awards	2016	"Can't Feel My Face"	Top Radio Song	Nominated	
Billboard Music Awards	2017	Himself	Top Artist	Nominated	
Billboard Music Awards	2017	Himself	Top 100 Artist	Nominated	
Billboard Music Awards	2017	Himself	Top Male Artist	Nominated	
Billboard Music Awards	2017	Himself	Billboard Chart Achievement	Nominated	
Billboard Music Awards	2017	Himself	Top Billboard 200 Artist	Nominated	
Billboard Music Awards	2017	Himself	Top R&B Artist	Nominated	
Billboard Music Awards	2017	Starboy	Top Billboard 200 Album	Nominated	
Billboard Music Awards	2017	Starboy	Top R&B Album	Nominated	
Billboard Music Awards	2017	"Starboy" (featuring Daft Punk)	Top Streaming Song (Audio)	Nominated	
Billboard Music Awards	2017	"Starboy" (featuring Daft Punk)	Top Collaboration	Nominated	
Billboard Music Awards	2017	"Starboy" (featuring Daft Punk)	Top R&B Song	Nominated	
Billboard Music Awards	2017	"Starboy" (featuring Daft Punk)	Top R&B Collaboration	Nominated	
Billboard Music Awards	2017	"I Feel It Coming" (featuring Daft Punk)	Top R&B Collaboration	Nominated	
Billboard Music Awards	2018	Himself	Top R&B Artist	Nominated	
Billboard Music Awards	2018	Himself	Top R&B Male Artist	Nominated	
Billboard Music Awards	2018	Starboy: Legend of the Fall Tour	Top R&B Tour	Nominated	
Billboard Music Awards	2018	Starboy	Top R&B Album	Nominated	
Billboard Music Awards	2019	Himself	Top R&B Artist	Nominated	
Billboard Music Awards	2019	Himself	Top R&B Male Artist	Won	
Billboard Music Awards	2019	My Dear Melancholy	Top R&B Album	Nominated	
Billboard Music Awards	2020	Himself	Top R&B Artist	Nominated	
Billboard Music Awards	2020	Himself	Top R&B Male Artist	Nominated	
Billboard Music Awards	2020	"Heartless"	Top R&B Song	Nominated	
Billboard Music Awards	2021	Himself	Top Artist	Won	
Billboard Music Awards	2021	Himself	Top Male Artist	Won	
Billboard Music Awards	2021	Himself	Top Hot 100 Artist	Won	
Billboard Music Awards	2021	Himself	Top Streaming Songs Artist	Nominated	
Billboard Music Awards	2021	Himself	Top Song Sales Artist	Nominated	
Billboard Music Awards	2021	Himself	Top Radio Songs Artist	Won	
Billboard Music Awards	2021	Himself	Top R&B Artist	Won	
Billboard Music Awards	2021	Himself	Top R&B Male Artist	Won	
Billboard Music Awards	2021	After Hours	Top Billboard 200 Album	Nominated	
Billboard Music Awards	2021	After Hours	Top R&B Album	Won	
Billboard Music Awards	2021	"Blinding Lights"	Top Hot 100 Song	Won	
Billboard Music Awards	2021	"Blinding Lights"	Top Streaming Song	Nominated	
Billboard Music Awards	2021	"Blinding Lights"	Top Selling Song	Nominated	
Billboard Music Awards	2021	"Blinding Lights"	Top Radio Song	Won	
Billboard Music Awards	2021	"Blinding Lights"	Top R&B Song	Won	
Billboard Music Awards	2021	"Hawái (Remix)" (with Maluma)	Top Latin Song	Nominated	
Billboard Music Awards	2022	"Save Your Tears (Remix)" (with Ariana Grande)	Top Global 200 Song	Nominated	
Billboard Music Awards	2022	"Save Your Tears (Remix)" (with Ariana Grande)	Top Global (Excl. US) Song	Nominated	
Billboard Music Awards	2022	"Save Your Tears (Remix)" (with Ariana Grande)	Top Hot 100 Song	Nominated	
Billboard Music Awards	2022	"Save Your Tears (Remix)" (with Ariana Grande)	Top Collaboration	Nominated	
Billboard Music Awards	2022	"Save Your Tears (Remix)" (with Ariana Grande)	Top Streaming Song	Nominated	
Billboard Music Awards	2022	"Save Your Tears (Remix)" (with Ariana Grande)	Top Radio Song	Nominated	
Billboard Music Awards	2022	Dawn FM	Top R&B Album	Nominated	
Billboard Music Awards	2022	"You Right" (with Doja Cat)	Top R&B Song	Nominated	
Billboard Music Awards	2022	Himself	Top Artist	Nominated	
Billboard Music Awards	2022	Himself	Top Male Artist	Nominated	
Billboard Music Awards	2022	Himself	Top Hot 100 Artist	Nominated	
Billboard Music Awards	2022	Himself	Top Streaming Songs Artist	Nominated	
Billboard Music Awards	2022	Himself	Top Radio Songs Artist	Nominated	
Billboard Music Awards	2022	Himself	Top Billboard Global 200 Artist	Nominated	
Billboard Music Awards	2022	Himself	Top Billboard Global (Excl. US) Artist	Nominated	
Billboard Music Awards	2022	Himself	Top R&B Artist	Nominated	
Billboard Music Awards	2022	Himself	Top R&B Male Artist	Won	
Billboard Music Awards	2023	Himself	Top Male Artist	Nominated	
Billboard Music Awards	2023	Himself	Top Radio Songs Artist	Nominated	
Billboard Music Awards	2023	Himself	Top Billboard Global 200 Artist	Nominated	
Billboard Music Awards	2023	Himself	Top Billboard Global (Excl. U.S.) Artist	Nominated	
Billboard Music Awards	2023	Himself	Top R&B Artist	Nominated	
Billboard Music Awards	2023	Himself	Top R&B Male Artist	Won	
Billboard Music Awards	2023	Himself	Top R&B Touring Artist	Nominated	
Billboard Music Awards	2023	"Creepin'" (with 21 Savage and Metro Boomin)	Top Hot 100 Song	Nominated	
Billboard Music Awards	2023	"Creepin'" (with 21 Savage and Metro Boomin)	Top Collaboration	Won	
Billboard Music Awards	2023	"Creepin'" (with 21 Savage and Metro Boomin)	Top R&B Song	Nominated	
Billboard Music Awards	2023	"Creepin'" (with 21 Savage and Metro Boomin)	Top Radio Song	Nominated	
Billboard Music Awards	2023	"Die For You" (with Ariana Grande)	Top Radio Song	Nominated	
Billboard Music Awards	2023	"Die For You" (with Ariana Grande)	Top Billboard Global 200 Song	Nominated	
Billboard Music Awards	2023	"Die For You" (with Ariana Grande)	Top Billboard Global (Excl. U.S.) Song	Nominated	
Billboard Music Awards	2023	"Die For You" (with Ariana Grande)	Top Collaboration	Nominated	
Billboard Music Awards	2023	"Die For You" (with Ariana Grande)	Top R&B Song	Nominated	
Billboard Latin Music Awards	2016	Himself	Crossover Artist of the Year	Nominated	
Billboard Latin Music Awards	2021	Himself	Crossover Artist of the Year	Nominated	
Billboard Latin Music Awards	2021	"Hawái (Remix)" (with Maluma)	Vocal Event Hot Latin Song of the Year	Nominated	
Billboard Latin Music Awards	2021	"Hawái (Remix)" (with Maluma)	Hot Latin Song of the Year	Nominated	
Billboard Latin Music Awards	2021	"Hawái (Remix)" (with Maluma)	Airplay Song of the Year	Won	
Billboard Latin Music Awards	2021	"Hawái (Remix)" (with Maluma)	Sales Song of the Year	Nominated	
Billboard Latin Music Awards	2021	"Hawái (Remix)" (with Maluma)	Streaming Song of the Year	Nominated	
Billboard Latin Music Awards	2021	"Hawái (Remix)" (with Maluma)	Latin Rhythm Song of the Year	Won	
Billboard Power Awards	2017	Himself	Power Artists	Won	
Billboard Touring Awards	2016	Himself	Breakthrough	Nominated	
Black Reel Awards	2016	"Earned It"	Outstanding Original Song	Nominated	
BRIT Awards	2016	Himself	International Male Solo Artist	Nominated	
BRIT Awards	2017	Himself	International Male Solo Artist	Nominated	
BRIT Awards	2021	Himself	International Male Solo Artist	Won	
BRIT Awards	2022	"Save Your Tears"	International Song of the Year	Nominated	
Canadian Radio Music Awards	2016	"Can't Feel My Face"	SOCAN Song of the Year	Won	
Canadian Radio Music Awards	2016	Himself	Fans' Choice	Won	
ECHO Music Awards	2016	Himself	Best International Newcomer	Nominated	
ECHO Music Awards	2016	Beauty Behind the Madness	Best International Hip Hop/Urban Album	Nominated	
GAFFA Awards (Denmark)	2015	Himself	Best Foreign Male Act	Won	
GAFFA Awards (Sweden)	2015	Beauty Behind the Madness	Best Foreign Album	Won	
GAFFA Awards (Sweden)	2018	"Lust For Life" (Lana Del Rey ft. the Weeknd)	Best Foreign Song	Won	
GAFFA Awards (Sweden)	2019	"Call Out My Name"	Best Foreign Song	Nominated	
Golden Raspberry Awards	2026	Hurry Up Tomorrow	Worst Picture (Note: as a producer)	Nominated	
Golden Raspberry Awards	2026	Hurry Up Tomorrow	Worst Actor	Nominated	
Golden Raspberry Awards	2026	Hurry Up Tomorrow	Worst Screenplay (Note: shared with Trey Edward Shults and Reza Fahim)	Nominated	
Golden Raspberry Awards	2026	Hurry Up Tomorrow	Worst Screen Combo (Note: shared with his colossal ego)	Nominated	
Grammy Awards	2014	"Remember You" (Wiz Khalifa ft. the Weeknd)	Best Rap/Sung Collaboration	Nominated	
Grammy Awards	2016	Beauty Behind the Madness	Album of the Year	Nominated	
Grammy Awards	2016	Beauty Behind the Madness	Best Urban Contemporary Album	Won	
Grammy Awards	2016	"Can't Feel My Face"	Record of the Year	Nominated	
Grammy Awards	2016	"Can't Feel My Face"	Best Pop Solo Performance	Nominated	
Grammy Awards	2016	"Earned It"	Best R&B Performance	Won	
Grammy Awards	2016	"Earned It"	Best R&B Song	Nominated	
Grammy Awards	2016	"Earned It"	Best Song Written for Visual Media	Nominated	
Grammy Awards	2017	Lemonade (as featured artist)	Album of the Year	Nominated	
Grammy Awards	2018	Starboy	Best Urban Contemporary Album	Won	
Grammy Awards	2022	Planet Her (as featured artist and songwriter)	Album of the Year	Nominated	
Grammy Awards	2022	Donda (as featured artist and songwriter)	Album of the Year	Nominated	
Grammy Awards	2022	"Hurricane" (as featured artist)	Best Melodic Rap Performance	Won	
Grammy Awards	2025	"We Still Don't Trust You" (Metro Boomin, Future ft. the Weeknd)	Best Melodic Rap Performance	Nominated	
iHeartRadio MMVAs	2013	"Wicked Games"	Video of the Year	Nominated	
iHeartRadio MMVAs	2014	"Live For" (feat. Drake)	Video of the Year	Nominated	
iHeartRadio MMVAs	2014	"Live For" (feat. Drake)	Fan Fave Video	Nominated	
iHeartRadio MMVAs	2014	Himself	Fan Fave Artist or Group	Nominated	
iHeartRadio MMVAs	2014	"Belong to the World"	International Video of the Year by a Canadian	Nominated	
iHeartRadio MMVAs	2015	"Often"	Video of the Year	Won	
iHeartRadio MMVAs	2015	"Often"	Best Director	Won	
iHeartRadio MMVAs	2015	"Earned It"	Best Pop Video	Won	
iHeartRadio MMVAs	2015	"Earned It"	Fan Fave Video	Nominated	
iHeartRadio MMVAs	2015	Himself	Fan Fave Artist or Group	Nominated	
iHeartRadio MMVAs	2015	Himself	Most Buzzworthy Canadian	Won	
iHeartRadio MMVAs	2016	"Might Not" (Belly feat. the Weeknd)	Video of the Year	Nominated	
iHeartRadio MMVAs	2016	"Might Not" (Belly feat. the Weeknd)	Best Hip-Hop Video	Nominated	
iHeartRadio MMVAs	2016	"Might Not" (Belly feat. the Weeknd)	Best MuchFACT Video	Nominated	
iHeartRadio MMVAs	2016	"Can't Feel My Face"	Canadian Single of the Year	Won	
iHeartRadio MMVAs	2016	Himself	Most Buzzworthy Canadian	Nominated	
iHeartRadio MMVAs	2016	Himself	Fan Fave Artist or Group	Nominated	
iHeartRadio MMVAs	2017	Himself	Most Buzzworthy Canadian	Nominated	
iHeartRadio MMVAs	2017	Himself	Fan Fave Artist or Group	Nominated	
iHeartRadio MMVAs	2017	"Starboy" (ft. Daft Punk)	Canadian Single of the Year	Nominated	
iHeartRadio MMVAs	2018	"Pray for Me" (with Kendrick Lamar)	Best Collaboration	Nominated	
iHeartRadio Music Awards	2016	Himself	Male Artist of the Year	Nominated	
iHeartRadio Music Awards	2016	Himself	R&B Artist of the Year	Nominated	
iHeartRadio Music Awards	2016	Beauty Behind the Madness	Album of the Year	Nominated	
iHeartRadio Music Awards	2016	"Can't Feel My Face"	Song of the Year	Nominated	
iHeartRadio Music Awards	2016	"The Hills"	R&B Song of the Year	Nominated	
iHeartRadio Music Awards	2016	"Earned It"	R&B Song of the Year	Won	
iHeartRadio Music Awards	2016	"Earned It"	Best Song from a Movie	Nominated	
iHeartRadio Music Awards	2017	Himself	Male Artist of the Year	Nominated	
iHeartRadio Music Awards	2017	Himself	R&B Artist of the Year	Won	
iHeartRadio Music Awards	2018	Himself	Male Artist of the Year	Nominated	
iHeartRadio Music Awards	2018	Himself	R&B Artist of the Year	Nominated	
iHeartRadio Music Awards	2018	Himself	Male Artist of the Year	Won	
iHeartRadio Music Awards	2018	Himself	Titanium Artist of the Year	Won	
iHeartRadio Music Awards	2019	My Dear Melancholy	R&B Album of the Year	Won	
iHeartRadio Music Awards	2021	"Blinding Lights"	Song of the Year	Won	
iHeartRadio Music Awards	2021	"Blinding Lights"	Titanium Song of the Year	Won	
iHeartRadio Music Awards	2021	"Blinding Lights"	Best Music Video	Nominated	
iHeartRadio Music Awards	2021	"Blinding Lights"	Best Lyrics	Nominated	
iHeartRadio Music Awards	2021	"Blinding Lights"	TikTok Bop of the Year	Won	
iHeartRadio Music Awards	2021	"Hawái (Remix)" (with Maluma)	Latin Pop/Reggaeton Song of the Year	Nominated	
iHeartRadio Music Awards	2022	Himself	Male Artist of the Year	Nominated	
iHeartRadio Music Awards	2022	"Save Your Tears"	Best Music Video	Nominated	
iHeartRadio Music Awards	2023	Himself	Artist of the Year	Nominated	
iHeartRadio Music Awards	2023	Himself	Favorite Tour Style	Nominated	
iHeartRadio Music Awards	2023	"One Right Now" (with Post Malone)	Best Collaboration	Nominated	
iHeartRadio Music Awards	2023	"You Right" (with Doja Cat)	Best Collaboration	Nominated	
iHeartRadio Music Awards	2024	"Creepin'" (with 21 Savage and Metro Boomin)	Song of the Year	Nominated	
iHeartRadio Music Awards	2024	"Creepin'" (with 21 Savage and Metro Boomin)	Best Collaboration	Nominated	
iHeartRadio Music Awards	2024	"Creepin'" (with 21 Savage and Metro Boomin)	R&B Song of the Year	Nominated	
iHeartRadio Titanium Awards	2020	"Blinding Lights"	1 Billion Total Audience Spins on iHeartRadio Stations	Won	
iHeartRadio Titanium Awards	2020	"Heartless"	1 Billion Total Audience Spins on iHeartRadio Stations	Won	
iHeartRadio Titanium Awards	2022	"Save Your Tears"	1 Billion Total Audience Spins on iHeartRadio Stations	Won	
iHeartRadio Titanium Awards	2023	"Creepin" (with The Weeknd & 21 Savage)	1 Billion Total Audience Spins on iHeartRadio Stations	Won	
Innovator Awards	2016	Himself	Music Innovator	Won	
International Dance Music Awards	2016	"Can't Feel My Face"	Best Commercial/Pop Dance Track	Nominated	
International Dance Music Awards	2016	"Can't Feel My Face"	Best R&B/Urban Dance Track	Won	
International Dance Music Awards	2016	"The Hills"	Best R&B/Urban Dance Track	Nominated	
International Dance Music Awards	2016	Himself	Best Breakthrough Artist	Nominated	
International Online Cinema Awards	2016	"Earned it"	Best Original Song	Nominated	
Juno Awards	2013	Himself	Breakthrough Artist of the Year	Won	
Juno Awards	2013	Trilogy	R&B/Soul Recording of the Year	Won	
Juno Awards	2014	Kiss Land	R&B/Soul Recording of the Year	Nominated	
Juno Awards	2015	"Often"	R&B/Soul Recording of the Year	Won	
Juno Awards	2015	Himself	Artist of the Year	Won	
Juno Awards	2016	Himself	Artist of the Year	Won	
Juno Awards	2016	Himself	Fan Choice Award	Nominated	
Juno Awards	2016	Himself	Songwriter of the Year	Won	
Juno Awards	2016	Beauty Behind the Madness	Album of the Year	Won	
Juno Awards	2016	Beauty Behind the Madness	R&B/Soul Recording of the Year	Won	
Juno Awards	2016	"Can't Feel My Face"	Single of the Year	Won	
Juno Awards	2017	Himself	Artist of the Year	Nominated	
Juno Awards	2017	Himself	Fan Choice Award	Nominated	
Juno Awards	2017	Starboy	Album of the Year	Nominated	
Juno Awards	2017	Starboy	R&B/Soul Recording of the Year	Won	
Juno Awards	2017	"Starboy" (featuring Daft Punk)	Single of the Year	Nominated	
Juno Awards	2018	"I Feel It Coming" (featuring Daft Punk)	Single of the Year	Nominated	
Juno Awards	2018	Himself	Fan Choice Award	Nominated	
Juno Awards	2019	Himself	Fan Choice Award	Nominated	
Juno Awards	2019	Himself	Artist of the Year	Nominated	
Juno Awards	2019	My Dear Melancholy	Album of the Year	Nominated	
Juno Awards	2019	My Dear Melancholy	R&B/Soul Recording of the Year	Nominated	
Juno Awards	2019	"Pray for Me" (with Kendrick Lamar)	Single of the Year	Nominated	
Juno Awards	2020	Himself	Fan Choice Award	Nominated	
Juno Awards	2021	Himself	Fan Choice Award	Nominated	
Juno Awards	2021	Himself	Artist of the Year	Won	
Juno Awards	2021	Himself	Songwriter of the Year	Won	
Juno Awards	2021	After Hours	Album of the Year	Won	
Juno Awards	2021	After Hours	Contemporary R&B/Soul Recording of the Year	Won	
Juno Awards	2021	"Blinding Lights"	Single of the Year	Won	
Juno Awards	2022	Himself	Artist of the Year	Nominated	
Juno Awards	2022	Himself	Songwriter of the Year	Won	
Juno Awards	2022	Himself	Fan Choice Award	Nominated	
Juno Awards	2022	"Take My Breath"	Single of the Year	Nominated	
Juno Awards	2022	"Take My Breath"	Contemporary R&B/Soul Recording of the Year	Won	
Juno Awards	2023	Himself	Artist of the Year	Won	
Juno Awards	2023	Himself	Songwriter of the Year	Won	
Juno Awards	2023	Himself	Fan Choice Award	Nominated	
Juno Awards	2023	"Sacrifice"	Single of the Year	Won	
Juno Awards	2023	Dawn FM	Album of the Year	Won	
Juno Awards	2023	Dawn FM	Pop Album of the Year	Won	
Latin American Music Awards	2017	Himself	Favorite Crossover Artist	Nominated	
Latin American Music Awards	2021	Himself	Favorite Crossover Artist	Nominated	
Latin American Music Awards	2021	"Hawái (Remix)" (with Maluma)	Song of the Year	Nominated	
Latin American Music Awards	2021	"Hawái (Remix)" (with Maluma)	Favorite Urban Song	Nominated	
Latin American Music Awards	2022	Himself	Favorite Crossover Artist	Won	
Latin American Music Awards	2023	Himself	Favorite Crossover Artist	Won	
Latin American Music Awards	2023	"La Fama" (with Rosalía)	Collaboration Crossover of the Year	Won	
Latin Grammy Awards	2021	"Hawái (Remix)" (with Maluma)	Best Urban Fusion/Performance	Nominated	
Latin Grammy Awards	2022	Motomami (as producer and songwriter)	Album of the Year	Won	
Latin Grammy Awards	2022	"La Fama" (with Rosalía)	Record of the Year	Nominated	
MOBO Awards	2015	Beauty Behind the Madness	Best International Album	Nominated	
MTV Europe Music Awards	2013	Himself	Best Canadian Act	Nominated	
MTV Europe Music Awards	2015	Himself	Best Canadian Act	Nominated	
MTV Europe Music Awards	2016	Himself	Best Canadian Act	Nominated	
MTV Europe Music Awards	2016	Himself	Best Male	Nominated	
MTV Europe Music Awards	2016	"Starboy" (featuring Daft Punk)	Best Video	Won	
MTV Europe Music Awards	2017	Himself	Best Canadian Act	Nominated	
MTV Europe Music Awards	2018	Himself	Best Canadian Act	Nominated	
MTV Europe Music Awards	2020	Himself	Best Canadian Act	Nominated	
MTV Europe Music Awards	2020	Himself	Best Artist	Nominated	
MTV Europe Music Awards	2020	"Blinding Lights"	Best Song	Nominated	
MTV Europe Music Awards	2020	"Blinding Lights"	Best Video	Nominated	
MTV Europe Music Awards	2021	Himself	Best Artist	Nominated	
MTV Europe Music Awards	2021	Himself	Best Canadian Act	Nominated	
MTV Europe Music Awards	2021	"Save Your Tears (Remix)" (with Ariana Grande)	Best Collaboration	Nominated	
MTV Europe Music Awards	2022	Himself	Best Live	Nominated	
MTV Europe Music Awards	2022	Himself	Best Canadian Act	Nominated	
MTV Europe Music Awards	2023	Himself	Best Live	Nominated	
MTV Europe Music Awards	2023	"Creepin'" (with Metro Boomin and 21 Savage)	Best Collaboration	Nominated	
MTV Video Music Awards	2013	"Wicked Games"	Artist to Watch	Nominated	
MTV Video Music Awards	2013	"Wicked Games"	Best Visual Effects	Nominated	
MTV Video Music Awards	2015	"Earned It"	Best Male Video	Nominated	
MTV Video Music Awards	2015	"Love Me Harder" (with Ariana Grande)	Best Collaboration	Nominated	
MTV Video Music Awards	2015	"Can't Feel My Face"	Song of Summer	Nominated	
MTV Video Music Awards	2016	"Can't Feel My Face"	Best Male Video	Nominated	
MTV Video Music Awards	2016	"Can't Feel My Face"	Best Visual Effects	Nominated	
MTV Video Music Awards	2017	"Reminder"	Video of the Year	Nominated	
MTV Video Music Awards	2017	"Reminder"	Best Direction	Nominated	
MTV Video Music Awards	2017	"Reminder"	Best Art Direction	Nominated	
MTV Video Music Awards	2017	"Reminder"	Best Editing	Nominated	
MTV Video Music Awards	2017	Himself	Artist of the Year	Nominated	
MTV Video Music Awards	2020	Himself	Artist of the Year	Nominated	
MTV Video Music Awards	2020	"Blinding Lights"	Video of the Year	Won	
MTV Video Music Awards	2020	"Blinding Lights"	Best R&B	Won	
MTV Video Music Awards	2020	"Blinding Lights"	Best Direction	Nominated	
MTV Video Music Awards	2020	"Blinding Lights"	Best Editing	Nominated	
MTV Video Music Awards	2020	"Blinding Lights"	Song of Summer	Nominated	
MTV Video Music Awards	2021	"Save Your Tears"	Video of the Year	Nominated	
MTV Video Music Awards	2021	"You Right" (with Doja Cat)	Best Visual Effects	Nominated	
MTV Video Music Awards	2022	"La Fama" (with Rosalía)	Best Collaboration	Nominated	
MTV Video Music Awards	2022	"One Right Now" (with Post Malone)	Best Collaboration	Nominated	
MTV Video Music Awards	2022	"Out of Time"	Best R&B	Won	
MTV Video Music Awards	2022	"Tears in the Club" (with FKA twigs)	Best Choreography	Nominated	
MTV Video Music Awards	2022	"Take My Breath"	Best Editing	Nominated	
MTV Video Music Awards	2023	"Creepin'" (with Metro Boomin & 21 Savage)	Best Collaboration	Nominated	
MTV Video Music Awards	2023	"Creepin'" (with Metro Boomin & 21 Savage)	Best Hip Hop	Nominated	
MTV Video Music Awards Japan	2014	"Belong to the World"	Best R&B Video	Nominated	
MTV Video Music Awards Japan	2016	"Can't Feel My Face"	Best Male International Video	Nominated	
MTV Video Music Awards Japan	2016	"Can't Feel My Face"	Best R&B Video	Nominated	
MTV Video Music Awards Japan	2020	"Blinding Lights"	Best Male International Video	Won	
MTV Millennial Awards	2021	"Save Your Tears"	Global Hit of the Year	Nominated	
MTV Millennial Awards Brazil	2020	"Blinding Lights"	Global Hit	Nominated	
MTV Millennial Awards Brazil	2021	"Save Your Tears (Remix)" (with Ariana Grande)	International Collaboration	Nominated	
MTVU Woodie Awards	2012	Himself	Breaking Woodie	Nominated	
MTVU Woodie Awards	2013	Himself	FOMO Woodie	Won	
Music in Action Awards	2021	Himself	Quincy Jones Humanitarian Award	Won	
MVPA Awards	2021	"Heartless"	Best R&B/Soul Video	Won	
MVPA Awards	2021	"Blinding Lights"	Best Editing in a Video	Won	
NAACP Image Awards	2016	Himself	Outstanding New Artist	Nominated	
NAACP Image Awards	2016	Himself	Outstanding Male Artist	Nominated	
NAACP Image Awards	2016	Beauty Behind the Madness	Outstanding Album	Nominated	
NAACP Image Awards	2016	"Can't Feel My Face"	Outstanding Music Video	Nominated	
Nickelodeon Kids' Choice Awards	2016	Himself	Favorite Male Singer	Nominated	
Nickelodeon Kids' Choice Awards	2016	"Can't Feel My Face"	Favorite Song of the Year	Nominated	
Nickelodeon Kids' Choice Awards	2017	Himself	Favorite Male Singer	Nominated	
Nickelodeon Kids' Choice Awards	2021	"Blinding Lights"	Favorite Song	Nominated	
Nickelodeon Kids' Choice Awards	2021	Himself	Favorite Male Artist	Nominated	
Nickelodeon Kids' Choice Awards	2024	Himself	Favorite Male Artist	Nominated	
NME Awards	2016	"Can't Feel My Face"	Best Track	Nominated	
NME Awards	2017	Himself	International Male Artist	Nominated	
NRJ Music Awards	2015	Himself	International Breakthrough of the Year	Nominated	
NRJ Music Awards	2016	Himself	International Male Artist of the Year	Nominated	
NRJ Music Awards	2017	Himself	International Male Artist of the Year	Nominated	
NRJ Music Awards	2017	Himself	Honor Award	Won	
NRJ Music Awards	2017	"I Feel It Coming" (featuring Daft Punk)	International Song of the Year	Nominated	
NRJ Music Awards	2020	Himself	International Male Artist of the Year	Won	
NRJ Music Awards	2020	"Blinding Lights"	International Song of the Year	Nominated	
NRJ Music Awards	2020	"Blinding Lights"	Video of the Year	Nominated	
NRJ Music Awards	2021	Himself	International Male Artist of the Year	Nominated	
NRJ Music Awards	2021	"Save Your Tears"	International Song of the Year	Nominated	
NRJ Music Awards	2021	"Save Your Tears"	Music Video of the Year	Nominated	
NRJ Music Awards	2021	"Save Your Tears (Remix)" (with Ariana Grande)	International Collaboration of the Year	Nominated	
NRJ Music Awards	2022	Himself	International Male Artist of the Year	Nominated	
NRJ Music Awards	2022	"La Fama" (with Rosalía)	International Collaboration of the Year	Nominated	
NRJ Music Awards	2023	Himself	International Male Artist of the Year	Nominated	
NRJ Music Awards	2023	"Creepin'" (with Metro Boomin & 21 Savage)	Cover / Adaptation	Nominated	
O Music Awards	2012	"Wicked Games"	Too Much Ass for TV	Won	
O Music Awards	2012	Himself	Best Web-born Artist	Won	
People's Choice Awards	2016	Himself	Favorite Male Singer	Nominated	
People's Choice Awards	2016	Himself	Favorite Breakout Artist	Nominated	
People's Choice Awards	2016	Himself	Favorite R&B Artist	Won	
People's Choice Awards	2016	"Can't Feel My Face"	Favorite Song	Nominated	
People's Choice Awards	2016	Beauty Behind the Madness	Favorite Album	Nominated	
People's Choice Awards	2017	Himself	Favorite Male Artist	Nominated	
People's Choice Awards	2017	Himself	Favorite R&B Artist	Nominated	
People's Choice Awards	2018	Himself	Male Artist of the Year	Nominated	
People's Choice Awards	2018	My Dear Melancholy	The Album of 2018	Nominated	
People's Choice Awards	2018	"Call Out My Name"	The Music Video of 2018	Nominated	
People's Choice Awards	2020	Himself	The Male Artist of 2020	Nominated	
People's Choice Awards	2020	After Hours	The Album of 2020	Nominated	
People's Choice Awards	2020	"Blinding Lights"	The Music Video of 2020	Nominated	
People's Choice Awards	2021	Himself	The Male Artist of 2021	Nominated	
People's Choice Awards	2021	"You Right" (with Doja Cat)	The Collaboration Song of 2021	Nominated	
People's Choice Awards	2022	Himself	The Male Artist of 2022	Nominated	
People's Choice Awards	2022	Dawn FM	The Album of 2022	Nominated	
Polaris Music Prize	2011	House of Balloons	Polaris Music Prize	Shortlisted	
Polaris Music Prize	2012	Echoes of Silence	Polaris Music Prize	Longlisted	
Polaris Music Prize	2016	Beauty Behind the Madness	Polaris Music Prize	Longlisted	
Polaris Music Prize	2017	Starboy	Polaris Music Prize	Longlisted	
Polaris Music Prize	2020	After Hours	Polaris Music Prize	Longlisted	
Polaris Music Prize	2022	Dawn FM	Polaris Music Prize	Longlisted	
Premios Juventud	2021	"Hawái" (Remix) (with Maluma)	Collaboration with an Anglo Artist	Won	
Premios Juventud	2022	"La Fama" (with Rosalía)	Collaboration OMG	Nominated	
Premio Lo Nuestro	2021	"Hawái" (Remix) (with Maluma)	Remix of the Year	Nominated	
Premio Lo Nuestro	2021	"Hawái" (Remix) (with Maluma)	Crossover Collaboration of the Year	Nominated	
Premio Lo Nuestro	2023	"La Fama" (with Rosalía)	Crossover Collaboration of the Year	Won	
Primetime Emmy Awards	2021	The Pepsi Super Bowl LV Halftime Show Starring The Weeknd	Outstanding Variety Special (Live)	Nominated	
SiriusXM Indie Awards	2012	Himself	Artist of the Year	Won	
SiriusXM Indie Awards	2013	Himself	Artist of the Year	Nominated	
SiriusXM Indie Awards	2013	Himself	Soul/R&B Artist of the Year	Won	
SiriusXM Indie Awards	2014	Himself	Artist of the Year	Nominated	
SiriusXM Indie Awards	2014	Himself	Must Follow Artist of The Year	Nominated	
SiriusXM Indie Awards	2014	Kiss Land	Album of the Year	Nominated	
SiriusXM Indie Awards	2014	"Live For" (feat. Drake)	Collaboration of the Year	Nominated	
SiriusXM Indie Awards	2015	Himself	Songwriter of the Year	Nominated	
SiriusXM Indie Awards	2015	Himself	Artist of The Year	Won	
SOCAN Music Awards	2013	"Wicked Games"	No. 1 Song Award	Won	
SOCAN Music Awards	2015	"Wanderlust"	Urban Music Awards	Won	
SOCAN Music Awards	2015	"Can't Feel My Face"	No. 1 Song Award	Won	
SOCAN Music Awards	2015	"Earned It"	No. 1 Song Award	Won	
SOCAN Music Awards	2015	"The Hills"	No. 1 Song Award	Won	
SOCAN Music Awards	2015	"Often"	No. 1 Song Award	Won	
SOCAN Music Awards	2015	"Love Me Harder" (with Ariana Grande)	No. 1 Song Award	Won	
SOCAN Music Awards	2015	"Live For" (feat. Drake)	No. 1 Song Award	Won	
SOCAN Music Awards	2016	"Starboy" (feat. Daft Punk)	No. 1 Song Award	Won	
SOCAN Music Awards	2016	"Might Not" (Belly feat. the Weeknd)	No. 1 Song Award	Won	
SOCAN Music Awards	2016	The Weeknd	International Achievement Award	Won	
SOCAN Music Awards	2016	The Weeknd	Songwriter of the Year	Won	
SOCAN Music Awards	2016	"Can't Feel My Face"	Pop/Rock Music Award	Won	
SOCAN Music Awards	2016	"The Hills"	Pop/Rock Music Award	Won	
SOCAN Music Awards	2016	"Earned It"	Pop/Rock Music Award	Won	
SOCAN Music Awards	2016	"Can't Feel My Face"	2015 SOCAN Classic Music Award	Won	
SOCAN Music Awards	2016	"The Hills"	2015 SOCAN Classic Music Award	Won	
SOCAN Music Awards	2016	"The Hills"	International Song Award	Won	
SOCAN Music Awards	2016	"Earned It"	Online Streaming Music Award	Won	
SOCAN Music Awards	2017	"Starboy" (feat. Daft Punk)	Pop Music Award	Won	
SOCAN Music Awards	2017	"Might Not" (Belly feat. the Weeknd)	Urban Music Award	Won	
SOCAN Music Awards	2018	"Some Way" (Nav feat. the Weeknd)	Viral Song Award	Won	
SOCAN Music Awards	2018	"Unforgettable" (French Montana feat. Swae Lee)	Rap Music Award	Won	
SOCAN Music Awards	2018	"I Feel It Coming" (feat. Daft Punk)	Pop Music Award	Won	
SOCAN Music Awards	2021	"Blinding Lights"	International Song Award	Won	
SOCAN Music Awards	2021	"Blinding Lights"	Pop Music Award	Won	
SOCAN Music Awards	2021	"Heartless"	Pop Music Award	Won	
SOCAN Music Awards	2021	Himself	Songwriter of the Year	Won	
SOCAN Music Awards	2021	"In Your Eyes"	R&B Music Award	Won	
Soul Train Awards	2015	"Earned It"	Video of the Year	Nominated	
Soul Train Awards	2015	"Earned It"	Song of the Year	Nominated	
Soul Train Awards	2015	"Earned It"	The Ashford & Simpson Songwriter's Award	Nominated	
Soul Train Awards	2015	Beauty Behind the Madness	Album of the Year	Won	
Soul Train Awards	2015	Himself	Best R&B/Soul Male Artist	Won	
Soul Train Awards	2016	Himself	Best R&B/Soul Male Artist	Nominated	
Soul Train Awards	2017	Himself	Best R&B/Soul Male Artist	Nominated	
Soul Train Awards	2017	Starboy	Album/Mixtape of the Year	Nominated	
Soul Train Awards	2020	Himself	Best R&B/Soul Male Artist	Nominated	
Soul Train Awards	2020	After Hours	Album of the Year	Nominated	
TEC Awards	2021	After Hours	Outstanding Creative Achievement – Record Production/Album	Nominated	
TEC Awards	2021	"Blinding Lights"	Outstanding Creative Achievement – Record Production/Single or Track	Nominated	
Teen Choice Awards	2015	Himself	Choice Music: R&B/Hip-Hop Artist	Nominated	
Teen Choice Awards	2015	Himself	Choice Music: Breakout Artist	Nominated	
Teen Choice Awards	2015	Himself	Choice Summer Music Star: Male	Nominated	
Teen Choice Awards	2015	"Earned It"	Choice Music: R&B/Hip-Hop Song	Nominated	
Teen Choice Awards	2015	"Earned It"	Choice Music: Love Song	Nominated	
Teen Choice Awards	2016	Himself	Choice Music: R&B/Hip-Hop Artist	Nominated	
Teen Choice Awards	2017	Himself	Choice Male Artist	Nominated	
Teen Choice Awards	2018	"Pray for Me" (with Kendrick Lamar)	Choice Music: Collaboration	Nominated	
UK Music Video Awards	2017	Himself	Best Artist	Nominated	
UK Music Video Awards	2017	"False Alarm"	Best Pop Video – International	Nominated	
UK Music Video Awards	2017	"False Alarm"	Best Visual Effects in a Video	Nominated	
UK Music Video Awards	2017	Vevo Presents: The Weeknd – False Alarm	Best Live Session	Nominated	
UK Music Video Awards	2020	"Blinding Lights"	Best Pop Video – International	Won	
UK Music Video Awards	2020	"Blinding Lights"	Best Cinematography in a Video	Nominated	
UK Music Video Awards	2020	"Blinding Lights"	Best Color Grading in a Video	Nominated	
UK Music Video Awards	2020	"Heartless" (Live)	Best Live Video	Won	
UK Music Video Awards	2020	"Blinding Lights" (Live)	Best Live Video	Nominated	
UK Music Video Awards	2021	"Save Your Tears" (Live)	Best Live Video	Nominated	
UK Music Video Awards	2021	"Take My Breath"	Best R&B/Soul Video – International	Nominated	
UK Music Video Awards	2022	"Out of Time"	Best R&B/Soul Video – International	Nominated	
UK Music Video Awards	2022	"Tears in the Club" (with FKA twigs)	Best R&B/Soul Video - UK	Nominated	
UK Music Video Awards	2022	"Tears in the Club" (with FKA twigs)	Best Wardrobe Styling in a Video	Nominated	
UK Music Video Awards	2022	"Tears in the Club" (with FKA twigs)	Best Hair & Make-up in a Video	Nominated	
UK Music Video Awards	2022	"Tears in the Club" (with FKA twigs)	Best Editing in a Video	Nominated	
UK Music Video Awards	2022	"Tears in the Club" (with FKA twigs)	Best Choreography in a Video	Nominated	
Webby Awards	2016	"In The Night"	Best Music Video	Won	
YouTube Music Awards	2015	Himself	50 Artists to Watch	Won	

== Other accolades ==
=== Listicles ===
Name of publisher, name of listicle, year(s) listed, and placement result
Publisher	Year(s)	Listicle	Result	Ref.
Billboard	2021	The Greatest Pop Stars of 2021	5th	
Insider	2022	25 Most Iconic Breaking Songs in Music History	Placed	
Time	2018	Next Generation Leaders	Placed	
Time	2020	Time 100	Placed	

=== State and cultural honours ===
Name of country, year given, and name of honour
Country	Year	Honour	Ref.
Canada	2014	Canada's Walk of Fame's Allan Slaight Honour	
Canada	2021	February 7, Toronto, Ontario (The Weeknd Day)	
Canada	2025	Key to the City of Toronto	

=== World records ===
Key
†	Indicates a now former world record holder

Name of publication, year the record was awarded, name of the record, and the name of the record holder
Publication	Year	World record	Record holder	Ref.
Guinness World Records	2017	† Most Streamed Album on Spotify in One Year (Note: 60 million unique listeners on Spotify between December 1, 2014, and December 1, 2015.)	Beauty Behind the Madness	
Guinness World Records	2017	† Most Consecutive Weeks in the Top 10 of Billboard Hot 100 by a Solo Male Artist (Note: 45 consecutive weeks on top 10 between March 7, 2015, and January 9, 2016, for the singles "Earned It", Can't Feel My Face and The Hills".)	The Weeknd	
Guinness World Records	2021	Most weeks in the Top 10 of the US Hot 100 (one track)	"Blinding Lights"	
Guinness World Records	2021	Most weeks in the Top 5 of the US Hot 100 (one track)	"Blinding Lights"	
Guinness World Records	2023	Most streamed track on Spotify	"Blinding Lights"	
Guinness World Records	2023	Most monthly listeners on Spotify	The Weeknd	
Guinness World Records	2023	First artist to reach 100 million monthly listeners on Spotify	The Weeknd	
