= Kiss Land =

2013 studio album by the Weeknd

Studio album by the Weeknd
- Released: September 10, 2013
- Studios: Conway (Los Angeles); South Beach (Miami); The Studio at the Setai (Miami Beach); Studio at the Palms (Las Vegas)
- Genres: Alternative R&B; dark wave
- Length: 55:38
- Labels: XO; Republic
- Producers: DannyBoyStyles; DaHeala; Silkky Johnson; The Weeknd

The Weeknd chronology
Trilogy (2012)	Kiss Land (2013)	Beauty Behind the Madness (2015)

Singles from Kiss Land
- 1. "Kiss Land" Released: May 17, 2013; 2. "Belong to the World" Released: July 16, 2013; 3. "Love in the Sky" Released: July 30, 2013; 4. "Live For" Released: August 20, 2013; 5. "Pretty" Released: October 9, 2013; 6. "Wanderlust" Released: March 31, 2014

Kiss Land is the debut studio album by Canadian singer-songwriter the Weeknd. It was released on September 10, 2013, through XO and Republic Records. The album was supported by the lead single of the same name, as well as "Belong to the World", "Love in the Sky", "Live For", "Pretty", and "Wanderlust". The album's production was primarily handled by DannyBoyStyles, the Weeknd himself and DaHeala, among others.

Kiss Land received generally positive reviews from critics. The album debuted at number two on the US Billboard 200, selling 95,000 copies in its first week. As of August 2015, the album had sold 273,000 copies in the United States.

== Background ==
On March 17, 2013, the Weeknd announced his debut album would be titled Kiss Land. In July 2013, Amazon revealed that the album would be released on August 27, 2013. On July 22, 2013, it was announced that the album would be pushed back from August 27, 2013, to September 10, 2013. In July 2013, during an interview with Complex, the Weeknd described the album, saying:

Kiss Land symbolizes the tour life, but it's a world that I created in my head. Just like House of Balloons symbolizes Toronto and my experiences there, but it's a world that I created. When I think about Kiss Land, I think about a terrifying place. It's a place I've never been to before that I'm very unfamiliar with. A lot of it is inspired by filmmakers like John Carpenter, David Cronenberg, and Ridley Scott, because they know how to capture fear. That's what Kiss Land is to me, an environment that's just honest fear. I don't know who I am right now and I'm doing all these outlandish things in these settings that I'm not familiar with. To me, it's the most terrifying thing ever. So when you hear the screams in the record and you hear all these horror references and you feel scared, listen to the music because I want you to feel what I'm feeling. Kiss Land is like a horror movie.

He also explained the album's second single "Belong to the World", saying: "Belong to the World" is about falling in love with the wrong person. There are some songs where I talk about the same person, but I like to make every song about someone else. Thursday is a conceptual album. Whatever that situation was, I spent the whole album focusing on that situation." He also explained where the title Kiss Land came from, saying: "I didn't want to call it Dark World or something so generic. The title came from a conversation that I overheard and those words stuck out. Someone said, "Kiss Land" and I thought, "That's going to be the title of my album." It sounds so ridiculous. When I put [the title] out everyone was like, "What the hell? This is going to be corny. It's going to be all lovey-dovey." On July 21, 2013, the album cover was released. On September 1, 2013, the entire album was made available for streaming on NPR Music.

== Promotion ==
=== Singles ===
On May 17, 2013, the first single "Kiss Land" was released. On June 25, 2013, the music video was released for "Kiss Land".

On July 15, 2013, the music video for the second single "Belong to the World" was released. The song was released the following day on July 16, 2013.

On July 30, 2013, "Love in the Sky" was released digitally as the third single from Kiss Land. Its release was accompanied by a short video.

On August 20, 2013, the track "Live For", which features Drake, impacted mainstream urban radio and was released along with the pre-order of the album on the iTunes Store. It was released digitally as the fourth single from Kiss Land three days later, with its music video released on September 11.

On September 20, 2013, the music video for "Pretty" premiered on Vevo. The song began to be pushed as the album's fifth single on October 9, 2013, supported by various late night live performances on shows such as Late Show with David Letterman and Late Night with Jimmy Fallon.

"Wanderlust" was released as the sixth single in the United Kingdom on March 31, 2014.

=== Tour ===
On July 8, 2013, the Weeknd announced a 29-date headlining North American concert tour in support of Kiss Land, titled The Kiss Land Fall Tour, which took place in several theatres and performing art centres. The tour began on September 6, and ended on November 25.

== Critical reception ==
Kiss Land ratings
Aggregate scores
Source	Rating
AnyDecentMusic?	6.5/10
Metacritic	65/100
Review scores
Source	Rating
AllMusic	2.5/5 stars
Entertainment Weekly	B+
The Guardian	2/5 stars
The Independent	2/5 stars
Los Angeles Times	3.5/4 stars
NME	8/10
The Observer	4/5 stars
Pitchfork	6.2/10
Rolling Stone	2/5 stars
Spin	7/10

Kiss Land was met with generally positive reviews. At Metacritic, which assigns a normalized rating out of 100 to reviews from professional publications, the album received an average score of 65, based on 31 reviews, indicating "generally favorable reviews". Aggregator AnyDecentMusic? gave it 6.5 out of 10, based on their assessment of the critical consensus.

Chris Payne of Billboard stated, "Blissfully hi-fi headphone candy that's not far from the Weeknd's mixtape trilogy, but with an added flair for the dramatic". In a review from Clash, Grant Brydon noted that "Rather than upgrading to studio album status by hiring an all-star cast of contributors, Kiss Land sticks to the familiar formula of 10 tracks, as per the mixtapes, with a single guest appearance from previous collaborator Drake. Tesfaye hasn't turned to gimmicks for Kiss Land. Instead, he's managed to transcend his previous efforts via the scaling up the sonics and simply maintaining the quality of this excellent record". In a more critical review, Anupa Mistry of Spin saying that "Kiss Land plays like a more considered, better-mastered continuation of Echoes of Silence, not anything dramatically different. And in that way, the dude from Toronto who created a shift is saying that he'll shift again only when he's ready". Andy Kellman of AllMusic said, "Kiss Land is more personal, more human, and will draw his fans closer to him. The slightly wider vocal range and additional expressiveness don't hurt his cause. For those who aren't as easily drawn into Tesfaye's world, this will seem roughly as insufferable and as bleakly aimless as the earlier material".

Jesse Cataldo of Slant Magazine said, "The music is never up to the conceptual task, and the album too often settles for numbing backdrops, with songs like "Belong to the World" and "Wanderlust" resembling wan impersonations of Bad-era Michael Jackson". Ian Cohen of Pitchfork said, "Kiss Land is technically the Weeknd's fourth album in two and a half years, and without the ear-turning innovation of the earlier work, all you can muster in reaction to its worldview, the same one that's been delivered repeatedly without variation, is, "Maybe it's you, man". Which in a way, vindicates it: Kiss Land sounds every bit as isolated and singular as Tesfaye feels". August Brown of the Los Angeles Times said, "For an act founded in anonymity and reserve, it turns out the Weeknd's most convincing work of art is Tesfaye's own rollout as a star and storyteller. Kiss Land is a rough place to visit. But then again, when it comes to sex and loneliness, we've all been there". Omar Burgess of HipHopDX said, "This album is a polished, lateral step with an accompanying barcode for Weeknd's fans. And outsiders looking to understand his appeal are likely better off downloading the three mixtapes that preceded the album".

Corey Beasley of PopMatters said, "It's easy to catch the way Kiss Land attempts to turn Trilogy's afterparty ennui into a big screen, on-the-road, b-movie melodrama (something like Only God Forgives, with even less of a plot). Still, the punches seem half-pulled, and the production glides by without much of an impact". Mike Madden of Consequence said, "Apart from its mild lyrical slips, Kiss Land doesn't really have any cosmetic issues, just relative shortcomings when you consider the singular thrills his 2011 output offered. The 23-year-old Tesfaye will almost certainly make a bigger, better record soon. For now, Kiss Land works fine as one of the year's most fearless pop releases". Julia LeConte of Now said, "Kiss Land is proof for the unconvinced: the Weeknd is a star whether he wants to be or not. And his voice. Oh, that delicious falsetto. Even seven-and-a-half minutes isn't long enough". Stephen Carlick of Exclaim! said, "The latest effort from the Weeknd is a mixed bag, but it can't be said that Abel Tesfaye is resting on his laurels. While many criticized his second two mixtapes, Thursday and Echoes of Silence, for being subpar reiterations of what he did so perfectly on House of Balloons, Kiss Land is anything but a retread".

=== Accolades ===
Nick Catucci of Entertainment Weekly named it the fifth best album of 2013 saying, "a nearly hour-long head trip in which sexual obsession, betrayal, addiction, and big-ticket trust issues tangle like limbs under silk sheets. It's Tesfaye's delicate falsetto — and dark, distinctly '80s guitar and synth sounds — that envelops you everywhere else. It's a weirdly exhilarating experience, with the bonus effect of torpedoing the make-believe encouraged by cheery online dating profiles".

In a 2023 feature revisiting the album, Adrianne Reece of Elite Daily described Kiss Land as "more timeless than his mainstream contemporaries Starboy and Beauty Behind the Madness." Reece also said, "The Weeknd produced a gnawing horror movie of an album that's both fascinating and eerie. That looming drawl glides in the album's sound design, which toy with menacing drum patterns and minor synths to create this space of unease. That discomfort is necessary, as it perfectly represents The Weeknd's state of mind while touring in a new atmosphere."

== Commercial performance ==
Kiss Land debuted at number two on the US Billboard 200 with 95,000 copies sold in its first week, just 2,000 copies short of Keith Urban's Fuse, which took the number-one spot that week. As of August 2015, the album had sold 273,000 copies in the United States. On March 18, 2019, the album was certified gold by the Recording Industry Association of America (RIAA), for combined sales and album-equivalent units over 500,000 units in the United States.

== Track listing ==
All tracks produced by DannyBoyStyles, the Weeknd and DaHeala, except where noted.

Standard edition
No.	Title	Writer(s)	Producer(s)	Length
1.	"Professional"	Abel Tesfaye; Ahmad Balshe; Danny Schofield; Jason Quenneville; Rory Quigley; Finian Greenall^{[c]}; Ema Jolly^{[c]}	DannyBoyStyles; The Weeknd; DaHeala; Harry Fraud^{[a]}	6:08
2.	"The Town"	Tesfaye; Balshe; Schofield; Quenneville		5:07
3.	"Adaptation"	Tesfaye; Balshe; Schofield; Quenneville; Gordon Sumner^{[d]}		4:43
4.	"Love in the Sky"	Tesfaye; Balshe; Richard Munoz; Schofield; Quenneville		4:30
5.	"Belong to the World"	Tesfaye; Balshe; Schofield; Quenneville		5:07
6.	"Live For" (featuring Drake)	Tesfaye; Aubrey Graham; Balshe; Schofield; Quenneville		3:44
7.	"Wanderlust"	Tesfaye; Balshe; Joseph Bostani; Munoz; Schofield; Quenneville; Selfia Musmin^{[e]}; Albert Tamaela^{[e]}		5:06
8.	"Kiss Land"	Tesfaye; Schofield; Jack Holkeboer; Quenneville; Sébastien Tellier^{[f]}	Silkky Johnson; The Weeknd^{[b]}; DaHeala^{[b]}	7:35
9.	"Pretty"	Tesfaye; Ricky Hilfiger; Schofield; Quenneville; Brandon Hollemon	DannyBoyStyles; The Weeknd; DaHeala; Hollemon^{[a]}	6:15
10.	"Tears in the Rain"	Tesfaye; Balshe; Schofield; Quenneville		7:24
Total length:				55:36

Deluxe edition
No.	Title	Writer(s)	Producer(s)	Length
11.	"Wanderlust" (Pharrell Remix)	Tesfaye; Balshe; Bostani; Munoz; Schofield; Quenneville; Pharrell Williams; Musmin^{[e]}; Tamaela^{[e]}	Williams	5:05
12.	"Odd Look" (performed by Kavinsky featuring the Weeknd)	Tesfaye; Vincent Belorgey; Balshe; Sebastian Akchoté	Sebastian	4:12
Total length:				64:53

=== Notes ===
- ^{^[a]} signifies an additional producer
- ^{^[b]} signifies a co-producer

=== Sample credits ===
- ^{^[c]} "Professional" contains elements and a sample of "Professional Loving", written by Finian Greenall and Ema Jolly, as performed by Emika.
- ^{^[d]} "Adaptation" embodies portions and a sample of "Bring on the Night", written by Gordon Sumner, as performed by The Police.
- ^{^[e]} "Wanderlust" embodies portions of "Precious Little Diamond", written by Selfia Musmin and Albert Tamaela, as performed by Fox the Fox.
- ^{^[f]} "Kiss Land" contains elements and a sample of "La Ritournelle", written and performed by Sébastien Tellier.

== Personnel ==
Credits adapted from the album's liner notes and Tidal.

Musicians

- Brandon "Bizzy" Holemon – guitar (2–9)
- Prince 85 – additional vocals (9)
- The Weeknd – vocals, songwriting, production

Technical

- Manny Marroquin – mixer (1–7, 9, 10)
- Mark "Spike" Stent – mixer (5, 8)
- DaHeala – engineer (1–3, 5–7, 10), recording engineer (4, 5, 8, 9)
- Goggs – engineer (1–3, 5–9)
- Chris "Tek" O'Ryan – engineer (6, 10), assistant recording engineer (4)
- DannyBoyStyles – recording engineer
- Chris Galland – assistant mixer (1–7, 9)
- Delbert Bowers – assistant mixer (1–7, 9)
- Geoff Swan – assistant mixer (5, 8)
- Matty Green – assistant mixer (5, 8)

== Charts ==
=== Weekly charts ===
Chart performance for Kiss Land
Chart (2013)	Peak position
Australian Albums (ARIA)	30
Australian Urban Albums (ARIA)	4
Belgian Albums (Ultratop Flanders)	50
Belgian Albums (Ultratop Wallonia)	41
Canadian Albums (Billboard)	2
Danish Albums (Hitlisten)	6
Dutch Albums (Album Top 100)	52
French Albums (SNEP)	93
German Albums (Offizielle Top 100)	93
Irish Albums (IRMA)	58
Norwegian Albums (VG-lista)	25
Scottish Albums (Official Charts)	38
Swedish Albums (Sverigetopplistan)	60
Swiss Albums (Schweizer Hitparade)	62
UK Albums (Official Charts)	12
UK R&B Albums (Official Charts)	1
US Billboard 200	2
US Top R&B/Hip-Hop Albums (Billboard)	1

2025 chart performance for Kiss Land
Chart (2026)	Peak position
Portuguese Albums (AFP)	99

=== Year-end charts ===
2013 year-end chart performance for Kiss Land
Chart (2013)	Position
US Billboard 200	151
US Top R&B/Hip-Hop Albums (Billboard)	35

2014 year-end chart performance for Kiss Land
Chart (2014)	Position
US Top R&B/Hip-Hop Albums (Billboard)	67

== Certifications ==
Certifications for Kiss Land
Region	Certification	Certified units/sales
Canada (Music Canada)	Platinum	80,000^{‡}
Denmark (IFPI Danmark)	Gold	10,000^{‡}
United Kingdom (BPI)	Gold	100,000^{‡}
United States (RIAA)	Gold	500,000^{‡}
^{‡} Sales+streaming figures based on certification alone.
