= Precious Little Diamond =

1984 single by Fox the Fox

Single by Fox the Fox

from the album In the Dark of the Nite
- B-side: "Man on the Run"
- Released: Spring 1984
- Genre: Synth-pop
- Length: 3:55
- Label: CBS
- Songwriters: Berth Tamaëla; Sylhouette Musmin
- Producer: Willem Ennes

Fox the Fox singles chronology
"Flirting and Showing" (1983)	"Precious Little Diamond" (1984)	"I.C. Eyes" (1984)

"Precious Little Diamond" is a song by Dutch funk band Fox the Fox, released in Spring 1984 as the second single from their debut studio album, In the Dark of the Nite.

The single peaked at number 11 on the Dutch singles Chart, staying on the chart for 7 weeks. In Germany it peaked at number 5. In the US it peaked at number 18 on the U.S. Billboard Hot Dance Music/Club Play Chart.

== The track ==
Dieter Bohlen has been cited with this song as the inspiration for using falsetto choruses in his songs, such as Modern Talking, C.C. Catch and Blue System. In 2013, the song was sampled in The Weeknd's song "Wanderlust", on his album Kiss Land. The Weeknd samples the melody, the original chorus and a part of the original lyrics.

== Track listing and formats ==
- Dutch 7-inch single

A. "Precious Little Diamond" – 3:55
B. "Man on the Run" – 3:55

- Dutch 12-inch single

A. "Precious Little Diamond" (Special Remix) – 7:26
B. "Man on the Run" – 3:55

== Charts ==
=== Weekly charts ===
Weekly chart performance for "Precious Little Diamond"
Chart (1984–1986)	Peak position
Belgium (Ultratop 50 Flanders)	38
France (SNEP)	15
Netherlands (Dutch Top 40)	14
Netherlands (Single Top 100)	11
UK Singles (OCC)	86
West Germany (GfK)	5

=== Year-end charts ===
Year-end chart performance for "Precious Little Diamond"
Chart (1984)	Position
West Germany (Official German Charts)	30
