= Kiss Land (song) =

Single by the Weeknd

from the album Kiss Land
- Released: May 17, 2013
- Length: 7:36
- Label: XO; Republic
- Songwriters: Sébastien Tellier; Abel Tesfaye; Jack Holkeboer; Danny Schofield; Jason "DaHeala" Quenneville
- Producers: Silkky Johnson; DannyBoyStyles; The Weeknd; Jason "DaHeala" Quenneville

The Weeknd singles chronology
"The Zone" (2012)	"Kiss Land" (2013)	"Belong to the World" (2013)

Music video
- "Kiss Land" on YouTube

"Kiss Land" is a song by the Canadian singer-songwriter the Weeknd, from his debut studio album of the same name. It was released on May 17, 2013, by XO and Republic Records, as the lead single from the album. The song was written by the Weeknd, Danny Schofield, Jason Quenneville, all three producing the song with Silkky Johnson, with Jack Holkeboer receiving writing credits.

== Background and composition ==
In 2011, the Weeknd released the mixtapes House of Balloons, Thursday, and Echoes of Silence to critical acclaim. The following year, he released the compilation album Trilogy, which contained his earlier projects with three newly recorded tracks. The Weeknd began work on his debut studio album Kiss Land in 2013; he revealed the title and cover artwork on March 17.

The song was produced by Silkky Johnson, known for his previous work with ASAP Mob and Lil B, in which the first half of the song is a repurpose of another song he initially produced for Main Attrakionz entitled "Nothin' Gonna Change," from the 2011 mixtape 808s & Dark Grapes II. "Kiss Land" was released to the iTunes Store on May 17, 2013, and lasts for seven minutes and thirty-six seconds, it contains a sample of "La Ritournelle" by French musician Sébastien Tellier. The song was co-produced by DannyBoyStyles, the Weeknd himself and Jason "DaHeala" Quenneville. It is divided into two musical portions; the first section discusses themes of sex, while the latter half addresses the topics of alcoholism.

== Critical reception ==
Upon its release, "Kiss Land" was met with widespread acclaim from music critics. Lauren Nostro from Complex complimented the Weeknd's growth as an artist, noting that he "continually refines" his "defined aesthetic", and noted that the track "boasts a bridge". Global Grind's Brittany Lewis described the song as "hypnotic", while Carl Williott of Idolator thought that the use of a woman's scream brought a "sinister lothario thing to absurd new heights". Rob Markman from MTV News felt that "Kiss Land" shared a similar structure to the Weeknd's previous tracks, but also suggested that the forthcoming release of Kiss Land will reveal "a lot more about music's mystery man".

VH1 India gave "Kiss Land" a 7/10 citing it as "An impressive sequential plunge into the Weeknd's cryptic tide, but as he himself so coyly reminds us,"This is nothing to relate to," and we may have already extended our invitation".

== Music video ==
The music video for "Kiss Land" was released on June 25, 2013. The video includes sexually explicit content, but a censored version of the video was released and is available to view on the Weeknd's account.

== Charts ==
Chart performance for "Kiss Land"
Chart (2013)	Peak position
South Korea International Streaming (Gaon)	195
