= Wanderlust (The Weeknd song) =

Single by the Weeknd

from the album Kiss Land
- Released: March 31, 2014
- Recorded: 2013
- Genre: Synth-pop
- Length: 5:07
- Label: XO; Republic
- Songwriters: Abel Tesfaye; Danny Schofield; Ahmad Balshe; Jason Quenneville; Richard Munoz; Joseph Bostani; Sylvia Musmin; Bert Tamaela
- Producers: The Weeknd; DannyBoyStyles; Quenneville

The Weeknd singles chronology
"Or Nah (Remix)" (2014)	"Wanderlust" (2014)	"Often" (2014)

Audio video
- "Wanderlust" on YouTube

"Wanderlust" is a song by the Canadian singer-songwriter the Weeknd from his debut studio album, Kiss Land (2013). The song heavily samples "Precious Little Diamond" by Dutch disco group Fox the Fox, and was released as the sixth single from the album on March 31, 2014. A remix of "Wanderlust" by Pharrell Williams also appears as a bonus track on the iTunes edition of Kiss Land.

== Track listing ==
Digital download — EP
No.	Title	Length
1.	"Wanderlust" (Steve Pitron & Max Sanna Club Mix)	6:36
2.	"Wanderlust" (Steve Pitron & Max Sanna Radio Edit)	3:45
3.	"Wanderlust" (Clean Bandit Remix)	3:16

Digital download — remix
No.	Title	Length
1.	"Wanderlust" (Pharrell Remix)	5:10

== Charts ==
Chart (2014)	Peak position
Canada Hot 100 (Billboard)	45
Canada CHR/Top 40 (Billboard)	14
Canada Hot AC (Billboard)	40

== Certifications ==
Region	Certification	Certified units/sales
Canada (Music Canada)	Gold	40,000^{‡}
^{‡} Sales+streaming figures based on certification alone.

== Release history ==
Region	Date	Format	Label	Ref.
United Kingdom	March 31, 2014	Contemporary hit radio	XO; Republic	
United Kingdom	May 16, 2014	Digital download	XO	
Canada	May 19, 2014	Digital download	XO	
United Kingdom	June 13, 2014	Digital download (Pharrell remix)	XO	
