= Live For =

Single by the Weeknd featuring Drake

from the album Kiss Land
- Released: August 20, 2013
- Recorded: 2013
- Length: 3:45
- Label: XO; Republic
- Songwriters: Abel Tesfaye; Aubrey Graham; Danny Schofield; Ahmad Balshe; Jason "DaHeala" Quenneville
- Producers: DannyBoyStyles; The Weeknd; Jason "DaHeala" Quenneville

The Weeknd singles chronology
"Love in the Sky" (2013)	"Live For" (2013)	"Elastic Heart" (2013)

Drake singles chronology
"Hold On, We're Going Home" (2013)	"Live For" (2013)	"All Me" (2013)

Music video
- "Live For" on YouTube

"Live For" is a song by the Canadian singer-songwriter the Weeknd from his debut studio album, Kiss Land (2013). The song, which features guest vocals from Canadian rapper Drake, was released as the album's fourth single on August 20, 2013.

== Background ==
On July 27, 2013, the Weeknd posted a picture with Drake being in the studio together, dispelling past rumors of them feuding.

== Music video ==
The music video was released on September 11, 2013.

== Charts ==
Weekly chart performance for "Live For"
Chart (2013)	Peak position
Belgium Urban (Ultratop Flanders)	37
South Korea International Digital Chart (Gaon)	143
UK Singles (Official Charts Company)	111
UK Hip Hop/R&B (Official Charts)	23
US Bubbling Under Hot 100 Singles (Billboard)	19
US Hot R&B/Hip-Hop Songs (Billboard)	47

== Release history ==
Region	Date	Format	Label
United States	August 20, 2013	Mainstream urban radio	Republic
United Kingdom	August 23, 2013	Digital download	Universal
United States	September 3, 2013	Digital download	Republic
