= Belong to the World =

Single by the Weeknd

from the album Kiss Land
- Released: July 16, 2013
- Recorded: 2013
- Length: 5:07
- Label: XO; Republic
- Songwriters: Abel Tesfaye; Danny Schofield; Ahmad Balshe; Jason Quenneville
- Producers: DannyBoyStyles; The Weeknd; DaHeala

The Weeknd singles chronology
"Kiss Land" (2013)	"Belong to the World" (2013)	"Odd Look" (2013)

Music video
- "Belong to the World" on YouTube

"Belong to the World" is a song by the Canadian singer-songwriter The Weeknd from his debut studio album Kiss Land (2013). The song was released as the album's second single on July 16, 2013. The song was written by DannyBoyStyles, DaHeala, and the Weeknd, with Belly receiving additional writing credits.

== Background and release ==
Before its official release as a single, The Weeknd previewed the song at the Mod Club Theatre on June 13, 2013, which was tentatively called "You Belong to the World".

== Music video ==
The music video for "Belong to the World" was first released on July 15, 2013, via MTV. It was later uploaded to the Weeknd's Vevo account on YouTube the day following on July 16, 2013. The video is set in Japan and was directed by Anthony Mandler.

== Controversy ==
The song gained some controversy due to Geoff Barrow of Portishead accusing the Weeknd of allegedly sampling the drums used in their song "Machine Gun" without their permission. The Weeknd would later deny the accusations, and no lawsuits came as a result of the contest.

== Charts ==
Weekly chart performance for "Belong to the World"
Chart (2013)	Peak position
US Bubbling Under R&B/Hip-Hop Singles (Billboard)	7
US Hot R&B Songs (Billboard)	22

== Release history ==
Region	Date	Format	Label(s)	Ref
Worldwide	July 16, 2013	Digital download	XO; Republic	
