= Fox the Fox =

Dutch synth-pop band

Fox the Fox was a group that was founded in 1981 by Berth Tamaëla and Sylvia Musmin, also known as Silhouette Musmin. The band is best known for their hit single "Precious Little Diamond". "Precious Little Diamond" inspired the sound of Modern Talking cited by Dieter Bohlen and would later be sampled by The Weeknd for his song "Wanderlust".

== History ==
Fox the Fox, was a Dutch funk band founded by Tamaëla and Musmin in 1981. Among the members were bassist Gino Jansen, guitarist Kier van der Werf, keyboardist Roy Kuschel, and drummers Robbie Brans, Tjalling Bos and Han Langkamp. Musmin wrote all the lyrics. Two years after founding the band they released "Flirting and Showing", which reached number 40 in the Netherlands and Germany. A year later they released the single "Precious Little Diamond", which reached fifth place in Germany, number 18 on the U.S. Billboard Hot Dance Music/Club Play, 11 in the Netherlands, 15 in France, 38 in Belgium and 86 in the United Kingdom. Subsequent singles and albums were not successful.

The band split up after the departure of Tamaëla in 1990. Silhouette Musmin has retired from the music business and is now a practitioner of alternative medicine in Amsterdam, while Berth Tamaëla is still making music and his most recent act is called Beat-T.

== Discography ==
Singles

"Flirting and Showing"
NLD: 40
DEU: 40 – 1984/49
"Precious Little Diamond"
DEU: 5 – 1984/31 – 6 Wo.
USA: 18 - U.S. Billboard Hot Dance Music/Club Play
NLD: 11
FRA: 15
BEL: 38
GBR: 86

=== Albums ===
- 1984: In the Dark of the Nite
- 1989: Diamonds

=== Singles ===
- 1983: "Flirting and Showing"
- 1984: "Precious Little Diamond"
- 1984: "I.C. Eyes"
- 1984: "Stealin' (My Heart Away)"
- 1986: "She Don't Mind"
- 1987: "Star in the Nite (Too Late)"
- 1989: "Rock the Pop"
- 1989: "Something Special"
