= In the Night (The Weeknd song) =

Single by the Weeknd

from the album Beauty Behind the Madness
- Released: November 17, 2015
- Studio: MXM (Los Angeles, California); Wolf Cousins (Stockholm, Sweden)
- Genre: Disco
- Length: 3:55
- Label: XO; Republic
- Songwriters: Abel Tesfaye; Ahmad Balshe; Ali Payami; Savan Kotecha; Max Martin; Peter Svensson
- Producers: Max Martin; Ali Payami; The Weeknd (co.)

The Weeknd singles chronology
"Can't Feel My Face" (2015)	"In the Night" / "Acquainted" (2015)	"Might Not" (2015)

Music video
- "In The Night" on YouTube "In The Night" (Short version) on YouTube

"In the Night" is a song by the Canadian singer-songwriter the Weeknd, from his second studio album, Beauty Behind the Madness (2015). The song was written by the Weeknd, Max Martin, Ali Payami, Savan Kotecha, Peter Svensson, and Belly. Martin and Payami produced the song with co-production from the Weeknd. The song was serviced to contemporary hit radio through XO and Republic Records on November 17, 2015, as the album's fourth single.

== Background and release ==
In 2013, the Weeknd released his debut studio album, Kiss Land. Following its commercial underperformance, the Weeknd approached the head of urban A&R for Republic Records, Wendy Goldstein, for advice. Goldstein arranged for him to feature on the American singer Ariana Grande's 2014 song, "Love Me Harder". With the song, the Weeknd secured the services of Swedish producer Max Martin for his second studio album. The producer presented him with pre-written material, which the Weeknd rejected, choosing to write songs from scratch. "In the Night" was the first song the two wrote.

"In the Night" and two other songs by the Weeknd leaked on May 26, 2015. On August 4, the track list for Beauty Behind the Madness was revealed; "In the Night" appeared as the tenth track. On October 17, Rolling Stone reported that the song would be the next single from Beauty Behind the Madness. The song was serviced to contemporary hit radio on November 17, as the album's fourth single. Nearly five years after its release, on April 6, 2020, it was serviced to hot and modern adult contemporary radio stations.

== Composition and production ==
"In the Night" was written by the Weeknd, Belly, Martin, Savan Kotecha, Peter Svensson, and Ali Payami. Production was handled by Martin and Payami, with co-production from the Weeknd. Payami played live drums, synthesizers, keys, and bass, and provided programming for the song with additional contributions from Martin. At MXM Studios in Los Angeles, California, and Wolf Cousins Studios in Stockholm, Sweden, Sam Holland engineered the track with assistance from Cory Rice and Jeremy Lertola. It was mixed at MixStar Studios in Virginia Beach by Serban Ghenea, with John Hanes serving as mixing engineer. The track was mastered by Tom Coyne at Sterling Sound in New York City.

"In the Night" is a disco track. The song's sheet music shows a composition of A minor in compound meter at a moderate tempo of 112 beats per minute. The vocals span from E_{3} to D_{5}. Lyrically, "In the Night" details the story of a woman who is a victim of sexual abuse.

== Critical reception ==
The song was well received by critics. Like the Weeknd's previous collaboration with Max Martin, "Can't Feel My Face", it has been widely compared to works by Michael Jackson. Jon Dolan of Rolling Stone wrote "Sometimes, the album stirs up real drama. 'In the Night' could be just one more 'Dirty Diana'-style ode to a predatory babe — until we learn the woman in the song is the victim of abuse, 'dancing to relieve the pain.'" Harley Brown of Spin wrote that the song "comes the closest to the wall-scaling studio and automobile airwave euphoria of 'Can't Feel My Face', ratcheting up to background synths on the scope of '80s spectacles like 'Everybody Wants to Rule the World.'" He adds, "The real star here is, as usual, his voice, tapping at the uppermost fragile glass of his register without quite breaking it".

== Music video ==
The song's music video, directed by BRTHR, was released on December 8, 2015, and features the Weeknd's then-girlfriend, model Bella Hadid. It depicts Hadid as a waitress at a seedy nightclub of dancers frequented by dangerous gangsters. The leading gangster takes a particular liking to the waitress, as the Weeknd watches helplessly as she and the dancers are being taken advantage of by gangsters. The clip grows increasingly disorienting, building to a chaotic sequence in which the waitress and her fellow dancers finally kill off the gangsters. The leading gangster, however, tracks down the Weeknd in the final scene, placing a gun to his head — but is saved by who appears to be the waitress, who kills the gangster, before the two ride off on a motorcycle. The video ends with the dancers dragging a gangster's corpse into a sea, with shaky camera footage, as the screen goes to black. A shortened version of the video was released on February 14, 2016.

== Charts ==
=== Weekly charts ===
Chart (2015–2016)	Peak position
Argentina (Monitor Latino)	10
Australia (ARIA)	13
Belgium (Ultratop 50 Flanders)	29
Belgium Urban (Ultratop Flanders)	21
Belgium (Ultratip Bubbling Under Wallonia)	7
Canada Hot 100 (Billboard)	12
Canada AC (Billboard)	26
Canada CHR/Top 40 (Billboard)	4
Canada Hot AC (Billboard)	8
Czech Republic Airplay (ČNS IFPI)	63
Czech Republic Singles Digital (ČNS IFPI)	26
Denmark (Tracklisten)	26
France (SNEP)	124
France Airplay (SNEP)	35
Germany (GfK)	72
Hungary (Stream Top 40)	35
Ireland (IRMA)	42
Italy (FIMI)	39
Lebanon (OLT20)	5
Mexico (Billboard Mexican Airplay)	9
Mexico Anglo (Monitor Latino))	9
Netherlands (Dutch Top 40)	13
Netherlands (Single Top 100)	22
New Zealand (Recorded Music NZ)	22
Norway (VG-lista)	38
Portugal (AFP)	40
Scottish Singles Sales (Official Charts)	97
Sweden (Sverigetopplistan)	40
Switzerland (Schweizer Hitparade)	67
UK Singles (Official Charts)	48
UK Hip Hop/R&B (Official Charts)	8
US Billboard Hot 100	12
US Adult Contemporary (Billboard)	27
US Adult Pop Airplay (Billboard)	17
US Dance Club Songs (Billboard)	34
US Dance Airplay (Billboard)	11
US Hot R&B/Hip-Hop Songs (Billboard)	3
US Pop Airplay (Billboard)	3
US Rhythmic Airplay (Billboard)	1

=== Year-end charts ===
Chart (2016)	Position
Argentina (Monitor Latino)	48
Canada (Canadian Hot 100)	67
Netherlands (Dutch Top 40)	69
US Billboard Hot 100	61
US Hot R&B/Hip-Hop Songs (Billboard)	20
US Mainstream Top 40 (Billboard)	23
US Rhythmic (Billboard)	19

== Certifications ==
Region	Certification	Certified units/sales
Australia (ARIA)	Platinum	70,000^{‡}
Brazil (Pro-Música Brasil)	Platinum	60,000^{‡}
Canada (Music Canada)	2× Platinum	160,000^{‡}
Denmark (IFPI Danmark)	Platinum	90,000^{‡}
Mexico (AMPROFON)	Gold	30,000^{‡}
New Zealand (RMNZ)	Platinum	30,000^{‡}
Portugal (AFP)	Gold	10,000^{‡}
Sweden (GLF)	Platinum	40,000^{‡}
United Kingdom (BPI)	Gold	400,000^{‡}
United States (RIAA)	3× Platinum	3,000,000^{‡}
^{‡} Sales+streaming figures based on certification alone.

== Release history ==
Region	Date	Format	Label	Ref.
United States	November 17, 2015	Contemporary hit radio	XO; Republic	
United States	April 6, 2020	Hot/Modern/AC	XO; Republic	
