= Can't Feel My Face =

Single by the Weeknd

from the album Beauty Behind the Madness
- B-side: "The Hills"
- Released: June 8, 2015
- Studio: MXM (Los Angeles, California); Wolf Cousins (Stockholm, Sweden)
- Genre: Pop; disco-funk
- Length: 3:36
- Label: XO; Republic
- Songwriters: Ali Payami; Savan Kotecha; Max Martin; Abel Tesfaye; Peter Svensson
- Producers: Max Martin; Ali Payami

The Weeknd singles chronology
| "The Hills" (2015) | "Can't Feel My Face" (2015) | "In the Night" / "Acquainted" (2015) |

Music video
- "Can't Feel My Face" on YouTube

"Can't Feel My Face" is a song by the Canadian singer-songwriter the Weeknd from his second studio album, Beauty Behind the Madness (2015). The song was released on June 8, 2015, as the album's third single. It was written by Max Martin, Peter Svensson, Ali Payami, Savan Kotecha and the Weeknd, and produced by Martin and Payami.

Critics lauded "Can't Feel My Face", comparing the sound of the song to the works of Michael Jackson; Rolling Stone ranked it as the best song of 2015. It was also nominated for two Grammy Awards: Record of the Year and Best Pop Solo Performance. The song experienced commercial success, peaking at number one on both the US Billboard Hot 100 and the Canadian Hot 100, and was certified diamond by the Recording Industry Association of America (RIAA) for selling more than ten million copies in the country.

Elsewhere, "Can't Feel My Face" peaked at number one in Mexico, New Zealand, Denmark, Ireland and South Africa, and was a top 10 single in other territories, such as Australia, the Netherlands, Norway and the United Kingdom.

== Background and composition ==
"Can't Feel My Face" leaked in late May 2015. It was officially released on June 8, 2015, following a performance by the Weeknd at Apple's Worldwide Developers Conference on the same day.

The song is composed in the key of A minor and has a tempo of 108 beats per minute. The vocal range spans from E_{3} to E_{5}. Multiple sources have interpreted the song to be about cocaine, including a reference by the Weeknd himself in "Reminder": "I just won a new award for a kids show, Talking 'bout a face numbing off a bag of blow". Musically, Alice Vincent of The Daily Telegraph characterised as "a synth-laden, upbeat pop song", while Andy Kellman of AllMusic described it as "a sleek slice of retro-modern disco-funk".

== Critical reception ==
The song received widespread critical acclaim. Brennan Carley of Spin called it "pop perfection", "a thoroughly definitive, all-in jam" and predicted the song would "reach 'Uptown Funk' levels of airplay and ubiquity". Mallory Carra of Bustle called it "the official song of Summer 2015" and wrote that the "song has got it all: Fun, funky, catchy, and it sounds like Michael Jackson." Time's Esther Zuckerman deemed the song a "New Favorite Contender for Song of the Summer" and wrote that the chorus was "infectious". In June 2015, Jason Lipshutz of Billboard named it one of the "10 Best Songs of 2015 (So Far)".

Consequence of Sound compared the sound of the song to Michael Jackson. Complex wrote: "The song has a classic pop feel to it, with The Weeknd channeling a bit of Michael Jackson while crooning over the bouncy, and energetic production from Max Martin". Pitchfork's reviewer Renato Pagnani placed it in the Best New Track category and made the same comparison: "Perhaps recognizing just how dead-on Tesfaye's Michael Jackson impersonation was on his cover of "Dirty Diana", the producers anchor the track with a bassline that could have come from an alternate-dimension "Thriller" produced by New Age composer Vangelis instead of Quincy Jones."

The song ended up on multiple year-end lists, with Rolling Stone naming "Can't Feel My Face" as the best song of 2015: "It was the "oooooh!" that changed everything. That single ecstatic syllable, slipping out just before each chorus, transformed Abel Tesfaye (a.k.a. the Weeknd) from a cult R&B singer to a full-on pop star – just as decisively as a similar yelp of joy marked a new era in Michael Jackson's career when "Don't Stop 'Til You Get Enough" hit 36 years earlier. Max Martin's satin-smooth production helped, too, vaulting "Can't Feel My Face" straight to Number One on the pop charts with Scandinavian efficiency. But Tesfaye's showstopping vocal performance is what makes it an instant classic. He spends the song remaking himself as a pop giant – cleverly disguising his obsession with drugs beneath a metaphor about a dangerously hot fling, and playing down his angst-y tendencies until there's just a hint of existential pain in his lighter-than-air falsetto. By the time the song is over, you'll do anything for another hit." Billboard also picked "Can't Feel My Face" as the best song of 2015 on its year-end critics' picks: "The Weeknd's irresistible, Michael Jackson-esque "Can't Feel My Face" is so perfectly crafted that it's impossible to imagine a world or alternate reality in which this song isn't No. 1. There are enough hooks in this one single for a dozen chart-toppers, but Abel Tesfaye packed them all into three-and-a-half minutes of sheer ecstasy..." Entertainment Weekly also chose it as the best song of the year: "Everybody with any sort of access to a computer, television, or radio has heard that song seven billion times, and yet it still manages to sound bracing and fresh every time. It's a remarkable accomplishment." Stereogum ranked it at number 4 on its "The 50 Best Pop Songs Of 2015" list: "I'm still not convinced Abel Tesfaye will be this generation's Michael Jackson, but he does an extremely good impression." Vulture ranked it at number 8 on its "The 10 Best Songs of 2015" list: "An infectious bassline that trembles like a rubber pencil propels an ex-underground R&B lothario's triumphant transformation from neo-Prince to neo-MJ." MTV placed it on its "Best Songs Of 2015" list: "This was The Weeknd proving that he could hit Michael Jackson pop frequencies, while crafting a chart-topper that's uniquely his own." Village Voice named "Can't Feel My Face" the third-best single released in 2015 on their annual year-end critics' poll, Pazz & Jop. NME ranked it at number 43 on their "The Best Songs Of The Decade: The 2010s" list: "'Can't Feel My Face' was a bold move for The Weeknd – though not because it took risks musically. This hulking chunk of space-age disco-funk was always destined to top the charts." In 2021, Mixmag placed the song on its "The 30 Best Songs About Cocaine" list.

== Chart performance ==
"Can't Feel My Face" debuted at number 24 on the US Billboard Hot 100, making a Hot Shot Debut on the chart; it was the Weeknd's third Hot Shot Debut in a year after his previous singles "The Hills" and "Earned It". It produced first-week digital sales of 93,000 units and garnered 4.2 million US streams and 38 million airplay audiences. In its third week on the chart, the song reached number six on the Hot 100, making it his third top 10 hit, and his second solo top 10 hit. After three weeks at number two, "Can't Feel My Face" ascended to number one on the Hot 100, replacing OMI's "Cheerleader" and becoming the Weeknd's first number-one single on that chart. It spent three non-consecutive weeks in three separate runs at the top of the Billboard Hot 100, becoming the sixth song to achieve this feat, and the first song to do so since Bruno Mars's "Grenade" in 2011. In its third week at number one, "The Hills" reached number two, becoming the first act since The Black Eyed Peas to attain the top two positions on the Hot 100 as a lead artist. The following week, "The Hills" topped the chart, making the Weeknd the first artist since Taylor Swift to replace themselves at the top spot; "Can't Feel My Face" fell to number three. It spent nineteen weeks in the chart's top ten before dropping out on November 21, 2015. As of March 2016, it has sold 2,413,488 copies in the US.

It debuted in Australia on June 20 at number 27. It later peaked at number two on that chart. In New Zealand, the song debuted at number 12 on June 22 and spent four non-consecutive weeks at number two, before reaching number one in its ninth week on the chart. In the United Kingdom, "Can't Feel My Face" debuted at number 34, two weeks after "The Hills" had debuted on the chart. It later peaked at number three, becoming the Weeknd's second top 10 single in the country (after "Earned It" peaked at number four earlier in the year), and was also his highest-charting single in the country at the time.

In France, the song debuted at number 59, becoming his highest-entry in solo in the country. Several weeks later, the song reached the top five, becoming his second top five after "Earned It" earlier at that time, and stayed 43 weeks on the French Singles Chart. The track was later certified gold for 75,000 units sold, becoming his second after "Earned It".

The song also reached the top five in others countries, along with United Kingdom and France, peaking at number 1 in South Africa, Ireland, Mexico and Denmark, becoming his first number one for the latter, number 2 in Czech Republic and Slovakia, number 3 in the Netherlands and number 5 in Norway. The song also peaked the top ten in Sweden, Switzerland, Poland, Portugal, Russia and Italy and top twenty in Belgium, Finland, Hungary, South Korea, Spain and Germany.

== Music videos ==
The accompanying music video, directed by Grant Singer, was released on July 29, 2015, on Apple Music. As of 2026, the video has received over one billion views on YouTube, becoming the third most-viewed video by the Weeknd behind "The Hills" and "Starboy". It begins with the Weeknd singing in a bar to an unimpressed audience, with the exception of his love interest (played by Chanel Iman), until a man (played by Rick Wilder, who appeared in "The Hills" video), arrives and sets him on fire. The entire crowd, including the love interest, then stand up and starts to dance. The video ends with the Weeknd running out of the bar, still burning.

Time's reviewer Nolan Feeney wrote that the Weeknd "shines the spotlight on Tesfaye as he delivers a (literally) explosive performance". For Bianca Gracie of Idolator, "the usually-moody singer is refreshingly energetic". Jon Blistein of Rolling Stone deemed the video "simple but riveting". Slava Pastuk of Noisey called the video "a bit corny, but weirdly great?" USA Today's Brian Mansfield wrote: "Like his previous video for The Hills, it's sometimes troubling clip, full of fire and mayhem". Jason Lipshutz of Billboard opined that the video is "certainly a sonic homage to MJ, and watching the Weeknd strut around ablaze is an eery [sic] coincidence". Similarly, Michelle Geslani of Consequence of Sound wrote: "Abel Tesfaye is seen busting a couple of moves—no doubt, again, channeling Michael Jackson". Eric Diep of BET also described the video as an "homage to Michael Jackson", noting similarities in the vocals and dance moves.

An alternate music video was released on September 2, 2021.

== Live performances ==
The Weeknd performed "Can't Feel My Face" live for the first time at Apple WWDC 2015, the day before its digital release. On July 10, Taylor Swift invited the Weeknd on stage for her 1989 World Tour in East Rutherford at the MetLife Stadium. The song was performed live on television for the first time at the 2015 MTV Video Music Awards. The Weeknd also sang it during Victoria's Secret Fashion Show, which aired on December 8, 2015.

The Weeknd also performed a part of the song at the Super Bowl LV halftime show.

== Martin Garrix remix ==
On November 6, 2015, Martin Garrix released a remix of the song through XO lasting 4 minutes and 12 seconds. The remix was featured on the Japanese edition of Beauty Behind the Madness.

== In popular culture ==
- On July 27, 2015, actor Tom Cruise performed to "Can't Feel My Face" in a "Lip Sync Battle" on The Tonight Show Starring Jimmy Fallon.
- The song is also featured in the 2015 video game Madden NFL 16.
- Singer Stevie Wonder performed a parody of the song during a surprise pop-up concert at Central Park's SummerStage in New York City, August 17, 2015.
- NASCAR driver David Ragan posted a video lip syncing the song to his No. 55 Toyota in response to a commonly asked question "What is it like driving a NASCAR Sprint Cup car?"
- On September 7, 2015, popular YouTube channel Barack's Dubs uploaded a mashup video of former U.S. President Barack Obama singing the song.
- The song has also been named 2015's US Song of the Summer by Spotify.
- The song was featured in the 2015 YouTube Rewind as part of the video's soundtrack.
- On September 15, 2015, during a game of "The Wheel Of Musical Impersonations" on The Tonight Show starring Jimmy Fallon, Jimmy Fallon sang "Can't Feel My Face" in the style of Sting, and Ariana Grande sang it in the style of Céline Dion.
- The song also appeared in a season 2 episode of hit soap opera Empire called "Be True", aired on October 21, 2015.
- Jay McGuiness and Aliona Vilani danced their showdance to "Can't Feel My Face" in the 2015 Strictly Come Dancing finale on December 19, 2015.
- The song is also featured in other television shows including Being Mary Jane, Cooper Barrett's Guide to Surviving Life, Younger, Superstore, and The Real O'Neals.
- The song is also featured in the rhythm game Just Dance 2017.
- On the October 22, 2019, episode of reality television singing competition show The Voice, Team Gwen (Stefani) members Jessie Lawrence and Rose Short performed an arrangement of the song in a Battle round.
- A cover of the song by Kiana Ledé is played in the 2021 animated film Sing 2.

== Track listing ==
Digital download
| No. | Title | Length |
|---|---|---|
| 1. | "Can't Feel My Face" | 3:27 |

CD single
| No. | Title | Length |
|---|---|---|
| 1. | "Can't Feel My Face" | 3:35 |
| 2. | "The Hills" | 4:02 |

== Charts ==
=== Weekly charts ===
| Chart (2015–2021) | Peak position |
|---|---|
| Argentina (Monitor Latino) | 12 |
| Australia (ARIA) | 2 |
| Australian Urban (ARIA) | 1 |
| Austria (Ö3 Austria Top 40) | 14 |
| Belgium (Ultratop 50 Flanders) | 13 |
| Belgium Urban (Ultratop Flanders) | 3 |
| Belgium (Ultratop 50 Wallonia) | 24 |
| Canada Hot 100 (Billboard) | 1 |
| Canada AC (Billboard) | 6 |
| Canada CHR/Top 40 (Billboard) | 1 |
| Canada Hot AC (Billboard) | 1 |
| Canada Rock (Billboard) | 39 |
| Chile Airplay (Monitor Latino) | 3 |
| CIS Airplay (TopHit) | 6 |
| Czech Republic Airplay (ČNS IFPI) | 47 |
| Czech Republic Singles Digital (ČNS IFPI) | 2 |
| Denmark (Tracklisten) | 1 |
| Euro Digital Song Sales (Billboard) | 4 |
| Finland (Suomen virallinen lista) | 11 |
| France (SNEP) | 5 |
| France Airplay (SNEP) | 2 |
| Germany (GfK) | 14 |
| Global 200 (Billboard) | 81 |
| Hungary (Dance Top 40) | 24 |
| Hungary (Rádiós Top 40) | 34 |
| Hungary (Single Top 40) | 11 |
| Hungary (Stream Top 40) | 6 |
| Ireland (IRMA) | 1 |
| Italy (FIMI) | 9 |
| Israel International Airplay (Media Forest) | 1 |
| Japan Hot 100 (Billboard) | 45 |
| Lebanon (OLT20) | 6 |
| Mexico (Billboard Mexican Airplay) | 1 |
| Mexico Anglo (Monitor Latino) | 1 |
| Mexico Streaming (AMPROFON) | 5 |
| Netherlands (Dutch Top 40) | 2 |
| Netherlands (Single Top 100) | 3 |
| New Zealand (Recorded Music NZ) | 1 |
| Norway (VG-lista) | 5 |
| Poland Airplay (ZPAV) | 9 |
| Portugal (AFP) | 9 |
| Russia Airplay (TopHit) | 5 |
| Scottish Singles Sales (Official Charts) | 7 |
| Slovakia Airplay (ČNS IFPI) | 15 |
| Slovakia Singles Digital (ČNS IFPI) | 2 |
| Slovenia (SloTop50) | 12 |
| South Africa Airplay (EMA) | 1 |
| South Korea International (Gaon) | 13 |
| Spain (Promusicae) | 12 |
| Sweden (Sverigetopplistan) | 6 |
| Switzerland (Schweizer Hitparade) | 8 |
| UK Singles (Official Charts) | 3 |
| UK Hip Hop/R&B (Official Charts) | 1 |
| Ukraine Airplay (TopHit) | 14 |
| US Billboard Hot 100 | 1 |
| US Adult Contemporary (Billboard) | 13 |
| US Adult Pop Airplay (Billboard) | 2 |
| US Dance Club Songs (Billboard) | 20 |
| US Dance Airplay (Billboard) | 2 |
| US Hot R&B/Hip-Hop Songs (Billboard) | 1 |
| US Pop Airplay (Billboard) | 1 |
| US R&B/Hip-Hop Airplay (Billboard) | 46 |
| US Rhythmic Airplay (Billboard) | 1 |
| Venezuela (Record Report) | 93 |

=== Year-end charts ===
| Chart (2015) | Position |
|---|---|
| Australia (ARIA) | 12 |
| Australia Urban (ARIA) | 6 |
| Austria (Ö3 Austria Top 40) | 54 |
| Belgium (Ultratop 50 Flanders) | 56 |
| Canada (Canadian Hot 100) | 8 |
| CIS (Tophit) | 63 |
| Denmark (Tracklisten) | 12 |
| France (SNEP) | 43 |
| Germany (Official German Charts) | 47 |
| Hungary (Single Top 40) | 60 |
| Hungary (Stream Top 40) | 12 |
| Israel (Media Forest) | 6 |
| Italy (FIMI) | 35 |
| Netherlands (Dutch Top 40) | 10 |
| Netherlands (Single Top 100) | 20 |
| New Zealand (Recorded Music NZ) | 13 |
| Russia Airplay (Tophit) | 61 |
| Spain (PROMUSICAE) | 45 |
| Sweden (Sverigetopplistan) | 25 |
| Switzerland (Schweizer Hitparade) | 38 |
| UK Singles (OCC) | 21 |
| Ukraine Airplay (Tophit) | 148 |
| US Billboard Hot 100 | 12 |
| US Adult Contemporary (Billboard) | 30 |
| US Adult Top 40 (Billboard) | 14 |
| US Hot R&B/Hip-Hop Songs (Billboard) | 5 |
| US Mainstream Top 40 (Billboard) | 3 |
| US Rhythmic (Billboard) | 1 |

| Chart (2016) | Position |
|---|---|
| Argentina (Monitor Latino) | 29 |
| Australia Urban (ARIA) | 20 |
| Canada (Canadian Hot 100) | 36 |
| France (SNEP) | 132 |
| Hungary (Dance Top 40) | 96 |
| Hungary (Stream Top 40) | 85 |
| Israel (Media Forest) | 32 |
| Spain (PROMUSICAE) | 87 |
| Switzerland (Schweizer Hitparade) | 97 |
| UK Singles (OCC) | 79 |
| US Billboard Hot 100 | 72 |
| US Hot R&B/Hip-Hop Songs (Billboard) | 47 |

=== Decade-end charts ===
| Chart (2010–2019) | Position |
|---|---|
| UK Singles (OCC) | 97 |
| US Billboard Hot 100 | 63 |
| US Hot R&B/Hip-Hop Songs (Billboard) | 29 |

=== All-time charts ===
| Chart (1958–2018) | Position |
|---|---|
| US Billboard Hot 100 | 355 |

== Certifications ==
| Region | Certification | Certified units/sales |
|---|---|---|
| Australia (ARIA) | 11× Platinum | 770,000^{‡} |
| Austria (IFPI Austria) | Platinum | 30,000^{‡} |
| Belgium (BRMA) | Platinum | 20,000^{‡} |
| Brazil (Pro-Música Brasil) | 2× Diamond | 500,000^{‡} |
| Canada (Music Canada) | Diamond | 800,000^{‡} |
| Denmark (IFPI Danmark) | 4× Platinum | 360,000^{‡} |
| France (SNEP) | Gold | 75,000^{*} |
| Germany (BVMI) | Platinum | 400,000^{‡} |
| Italy (FIMI) | 3× Platinum | 150,000^{‡} |
| Mexico (AMPROFON) | Diamond+Gold | 330,000^{‡} |
| New Zealand (RMNZ) | 6× Platinum | 180,000^{‡} |
| Norway (IFPI Norway) | Platinum | 40,000^{‡} |
| Poland (ZPAV) | 4× Platinum | 200,000^{‡} |
| Portugal (AFP) | 3× Platinum | 60,000^{‡} |
| Sweden (GLF) | 6× Platinum | 240,000^{‡} |
| Spain (Promusicae) | 2× Platinum | 80,000^{‡} |
| United Kingdom (BPI) | 4× Platinum | 2,400,000^{‡} |
| United States (RIAA) | Diamond | 10,000,000^{‡} |
^{*} Sales figures based on certification alone.^{‡} Sales+streaming figures based on certification alone.

== Release history ==
Release history
| Region | Date | Format(s) | Label | Ref. |
|---|---|---|---|---|
| United States | June 9, 2015 | Radio airplay | Republic | |

== See also ==
- List of highest-certified singles in Australia
