= Beauty Behind the Madness =

2015 studio album by the Weeknd

Studio album by the Weeknd
- Released: August 28, 2015
- Studios: Abel's Crib (Toronto); Bota (Toronto); Conway (Los Angeles); MXM (Los Angeles); Daheala & Co.; Jungle City (New York City); The Lab (Santa Monica); Maison de Musique (Santa Monica); No Name (California); Wolf Cousins (Stockholm)
- Genres: Alternative R&B; pop
- Length: 65:06
- Labels: XO; Republic
- Producers: Ali Payami; Ben Billions; Che Pope; DaHeala; DannyBoyStyles; Illangelo; Kanye West; Labrinth; Max Martin; Mano; Peter Svensson; Stephan Moccio; The Weeknd

The Weeknd chronology
Kiss Land (2013)	Beauty Behind the Madness (2015)	Starboy (2016)

Singles from Beauty Behind the Madness
- 1. "Often" Released: July 31, 2014; 2. "The Hills" Released: May 27, 2015; 3. "Can't Feel My Face" Released: June 8, 2015; 4. "In the Night" Released: November 17, 2015; 5. "Acquainted" Released: November 17, 2015

Beauty Behind the Madness is the second studio album by Canadian singer-songwriter the Weeknd. It was released on August 28, 2015, through XO and Republic Records. It features guest appearances from Labrinth, Ed Sheeran and Lana Del Rey. The album was executively produced by the Weeknd, DaHeala and Illangelo, and includes production from Kanye West, Stephan Moccio, Ben Billions, DannyBoyStyles, Max Martin, and Ali Payami, among others.

Five singles were released from Beauty Behind the Madness, including two US Billboard Hot 100 number-ones: "The Hills" and "Can't Feel My Face". The album also includes the Academy Award-nominated track "Earned It", which served as the lead single from the soundtrack to Fifty Shades of Grey. Beauty Behind the Madness received generally positive reviews from critics and debuted at number one in several countries. It marked the Weeknd's first number-one album in the United States, earning 412,000 album-equivalent units in its first week. It was the tenth best-selling album of 2015, according to the International Federation of the Phonographic Industry, with 1.5 million copies sold worldwide. At the 58th Annual Grammy Awards in 2016, Beauty Behind the Madness won Best Urban Contemporary Album and was nominated for Album of the Year.

== Background and development ==
The Weeknd was recognized for his dark R&B music until 2015, seen in his first three mixtapes, House of Balloons, Thursday, and Echoes of Silence, all released in 2011, and his debut studio album, Kiss Land. Released in 2013, Kiss Land was reviewed positively by critics, and charted at number 2 on the Billboard 200. Despite this, the Weeknd deemed it a commercial underperformance, due to its failure to spawn successful singles and expand his fanbase. In his disappointment, the Weeknd approached Republic Records' head of urban A&R, Wendy Goldstein, for assistance.

Goldstein arranged a meeting between the Weeknd, American singer Ariana Grande and Swedish producer Max Martin, for the song "Love Me Harder", released on September 30, 2014. The Weeknd was unsure of the single's success, until it reached number 7 on the Billboard Hot 100, becoming his first top ten single. Realizing he could make pop music in his own way, the Weeknd secured Martin as a producer for his next project, desiring songs like "Love Me Harder". Their first session together begun sometime in the fall of 2014, in Martin's complex. Martin's team initially had pre-written material for the Weeknd, but he rejected all of it, opting to write entirely new material instead. The first song Martin and the Weeknd wrote was "In the Night", and they worked on the song with Ali Payami, Savan Kotecha, and Peter Svensson. While working together, Payami found inspiration in modern disco influenced tracks, which led to the creation of "Can't Feel My Face".

Republic's A&R team also sent the Weeknd to work on the soundtrack to the 2015 film, Fifty Shades of Grey, during its early stages of development. In 2014, with parts of the film changing, its director, Sam Taylor-Johnson, wanted a song sung by a male artist for the end credits. This led to the Weeknd writing the song "Earned It", with Stephan Moccio, Jason "DaHeala" Quenneville, and Ahmad "Belly" Balshe, in October. Moccio would produce two other tracks from Beauty Behind the Madness, "Real Life" and "Angel". According to Moccio, the chords from "Real Life" were taken from the 1954 jazz standard "Misty". Moccio presented "Angel", which had pre-recorded vocals from American singer Maty Noyes, to the Weeknd, who liked the track.

The Weeknd also executive produced the album with Illangelo, who he worked with on his first three mixtapes, and DaHeala. Illangelo attained production credits for 7 of the 14 tracks on the album, producing "Dark Times" and "Prisoner" alone. For the rest of his production, Illangelo applied finishing touches, which required either major or minor effort. British singer Labrinth had already arranged the track "Losers" prior to sending it to Illangelo. "Tell Your Friends" was produced by American rapper Kanye West, with Illangelo's work on the song mainly being add-ons and recording the Weeknd's vocals. "The Hills", recorded at the Weeknd's home studio, was heavily built off of a demo produced by their mutual friend, Emmanuel "Mano" Nickerson.

== Composition ==
Beauty Behind the Madness has been described by critics as a noticeable shift from the Weeknd's alternative R&B background to a more mainstream pop-oriented sound; with some of his original elements remaining intact. In addition to its alt-R&B and pop sonics, Beauty Behind the Madness incorporates elements of disco, funk, soul, art rock, blues, and trap. Influences of Michael Jackson's Thriller (1982) and Bad (1987) are also present throughout the album. Lyrical themes include romance, success, loneliness, self-loathing, and independence.

== Promotion ==
=== Tour ===
On June 26, 2014, the Weeknd announced the King of the Fall Tour, which spanned North America in September and October of that year. Schoolboy Q and Jhené Aiko appeared as supporting acts. The tour was announced the day after the Weeknd uploaded the single "Often" on SoundCloud. On August 20, 2015, he announced The Madness Fall Tour, his first arena tour, in support of the album.

=== Performances ===
On July 4, 2015, the Weeknd headlined FVDED in the Park in Surrey, British Columbia, Canada. On July 9, the Weeknd continued to promote the album by headlining summer music festivals, including Lollapalooza in Chicago, the Hard Summer Music Festival in Pomona, California, the Summer Set Music and Camping Festival in Somerset, Wisconsin, Philadelphia's Made in America Festival, Austin City Limits in Austin, and Seattle's Bumbershoot Festival.

=== Singles ===
The first single, "Often", was released on July 31, 2014, after appearing on streaming services the previous month. The song peaked at number 59 and number 69 on the US Billboard Hot 100 and Canadian Hot 100, respectively.

The second single, "The Hills", was released on May 27, 2015. The song peaked at number one on the Billboard Hot 100.

The third single, "Can't Feel My Face", was released on June 8, 2015, following the performance of the song by the Weeknd at Apple Worldwide Developers Conference on the same day. The song peaked at number one on the Billboard Hot 100.

"In the Night" was serviced to US contemporary hit radio on November 17, 2015, as the album's fourth single. The song peaked at number 12 on the Billboard Hot 100.

"Acquainted" was serviced to US urban contemporary radio on November 17, 2015, as the album's fifth and final single. It was also serviced to US rhythmic contemporary on February 16, 2016. The song peaked at number 60 on the Billboard Hot 100.

== Critical reception ==
Beauty Behind the Madness ratings
Aggregate scores
Source	Rating
AnyDecentMusic?	6.9/10
Metacritic	74/100
Review scores
Source	Rating
AllMusic	3/5 stars
The A.V. Club	B
Chicago Tribune	3.5/4 stars
The Daily Telegraph	3/5 stars
Entertainment Weekly	B
NME	7/10
The Observer	3/5 stars
Pitchfork	7.2/10
Rolling Stone	3.5/5 stars
Spin	7/10

Beauty Behind the Madness was met with generally positive reviews. At Metacritic, which assigns a normalized rating out of 100 to reviews from professional publications, the album received an average score of 74, based on 26 reviews. Aggregator AnyDecentMusic? gave it 6.9 out of 10, based on their assessment of the critical consensus.

Sheldon Pearce of The A.V. Club said, "It expertly and carefully closes the gap between the Weeknd's perception and his reality". Greg Kot of the Chicago Tribune said, "He's aiming for harder truths, creating pop that also works as a commentary on choice and consequence". Mackenzie Herd of Exclaim! said, "Beauty Behind the Madness proves that the Weeknd can thrive in the mainstream, and while the lyrics aren't overtly profound, he's proven that he is more versatile than previously thought, which is perhaps of greater importance at this stage in his career". Kyle Anderson of Entertainment Weekly said, "Anyone looking for a collection of homages to the King of Pop will be disappointed. Those masterpieces ["Can't Feel My Face" and "In The Night"] are outliers, and they end up making Madness' missteps all the more jarring.... In the middle of those two poles lies a series of bass-heavy throb-and-moan blasts with the signature oddness (shape-shifting melodies, twitchy percussion) that makes the Weeknd a compelling artist". April Clare Welsh of NME said, "He may have softened his edge, upped the production and pulled in the stars, but the Weeknd remains an outsider". Andrew Ryce of Pitchfork said, "In the end, enjoying the Weeknd requires a certain suspension of disbelief, and that remains true on Beauty Behind the Madness. You really have to buy into his bad-guy persona.... For newcomers, there's a whole world to explore, and on Beauty Behind the Madness it's richer and smarter than ever".

Jon Dolan of Rolling Stone said, "If the sound has widened and even brightened in spots, the Weeknd still rocks a serious Eeyore vibe for much of Beauty Behind the Madness". Harley Brown of Spin said, "Beauty Behind the Madness is front-loaded with fresh directions for the Weeknd that achieve the impossible: make it sound like he's actually enjoying himself". Andy Kellman of AllMusic said, "The commercial strides are obvious. The creative advancements are less apparent, obstructed by some unappealing measures, but they're in there". Helen Brown of The Daily Telegraph said, ""Real Life" builds up to a pitch of doomed drama from a corrosive slash of guitar as Tesfaye confides that even his "Mama called me destructive". But Ed Sheeran fails to rescue him on the tedious "Dark Times" and Lana Del Rey—who ought to be his perfect partner in pop-noir—adds nothing but a bored spritz of vocal perfume to the lethargic "Prisoner"". Andy Gill of The Independent said, "Beauty Behind the Madness leaves one feeling just as estranged from Abel Tesfaye's depraved character as previous releases boasting less adhesive tunes". Kitty Empire of The Observer said, "The Weeknd's most conventional songs thus far are Sheeran's boringly retro "Dark Times", and "Shameless", a guitar ballad unredeemable even by its deranged guitar solo. Elsewhere, the step up is more convincing, if not always easy to listen to".

=== Rankings ===
Select year-end rankings
Publication	List	Rank	Ref.
Billboard	25 Best Albums of 2015	18	
Complex	Best Albums of 2015	23	
Digital Spy	The 25 Best Albums of 2015	17	
Exclaim!	Exclaim!'s Top 10 Soul and R&B Albums of 2015	4	
Mojo	Top 50 Albums of 2015	45	
The New York Times	The Best Albums of 2015 (Jon Caramanica)	2	
NME	NME's Albums of the Year 2015	19	
Now	The Top Toronto Albums of 2015	8	
Pitchfork	Best Albums of 2015 (Reader's Poll)	43	
Rolling Stone	50 Best Albums of 2015	5	
Rolling Stone	20 Best R&B Albums of 2015	2	
Rolling Stone	500 Greatest Albums of All Time (2020 Revision)	442	

=== Industry awards ===
Awards and nominations
Year	Ceremony	Category	Result	Ref.
2015	American Music Awards	Favorite Soul/R&B Album	Won	
2015	GAFFA Awards (Sweden)	Best Foreign Album	Won	
2015	MOBO Awards	Best International Album	Nominated	
2015	Soul Train Music Awards	Best Album of the Year	Won	
2016	Grammy Awards	Best Urban Contemporary Album	Won	
2016	Grammy Awards	Album of the Year	Nominated	
2016	Billboard Music Awards	Top R&B Album	Won	
2016	Billboard Music Awards	Top Billboard 200 Album	Nominated	
2016	ECHO Music Awards	Best International Hip-Hop/Urban Album	Nominated	
2016	iHeartRadio Music Awards	Album of the Year	Nominated	
2016	Juno Awards	Album of the Year	Won	
2016	Juno Awards	R&B/Soul Recording of the Year	Won	
2016	NAACP Image Awards	Outstanding Album	Nominated	
2016	People's Choice Awards	Favorite Album	Nominated	
2016	Polaris Music Prize	Polaris Music Prize	Longlisted	
2017	Guinness World Records	Most Streamed Album in One Year	Won	

== Commercial performance ==
On August 31, 2015, Billboard estimated that Beauty Behind the Madness would sell approximately 300,000 copies during the first week of its release in the United States. The album debuted at number one on the Billboard 200 with 412,000 album-equivalent units; it sold 326,000 copies in its first week, with the remainder of its unit total reflecting its streaming activity and track sales. It marked the Weeknd's first number-one album. It remained atop the chart for the next two weeks and was the first album to spend three weeks at number one consecutively since Taylor Swift's 1989. The album also remained in the top 10 on the Billboard 200 for a total of 21 consecutive weeks. According to International Federation of the Phonographic Industry, Beauty Behind the Madness was the tenth best-selling album of 2015 worldwide. As of August 2017, the album has earned 3.7 million equivalent album units in the United States, of which 1.23 million are in traditional album sales. The set has also generated 2.05 billion on-demand audio streams for its songs. It was the most-streamed album of 2015, and the fifth most-streamed album of 2016 on Spotify.

== Track listing ==
Beauty Behind the Madness track listing (Note: Find additional credits for "Tell Your Friends" on the BMI Repertoire by searching the work number #20502911.)
No.	Title	Writer(s)	Producer(s)	Length
1.	"Real Life"	Abel Tesfaye; Jason Quenneville; Stephan Moccio	Moccio; DaHeala; The Weeknd	3:43
2.	"Losers" (featuring Labrinth)	Tesfaye; Timothy McKenzie; Carlo Montagnese	Labrinth; Illangelo; The Weeknd	4:41
3.	"Tell Your Friends"	Tesfaye; Kanye West; Christopher Pope; Montagnese; Carl Marshall; Robert Holmes; Michael Dean; Noah Goldstein	Che Pope; West; The Weeknd; Illangelo^{[a]}; Dean^{[a]}; Goldstein^{[b]}; Omar Riad^{[b]}	5:34
4.	"Often"	Tesfaye; Benjamin Diehl; Quenneville; Ahmad Balshe; Danny Schofield; Ali Kocatepe; Sabahattin Ali; Osman İşmen	Ben Billions; The Weeknd; DaHeala^{[a]}	4:09
5.	"The Hills"	Tesfaye; Balshe; Emmanuel Nickerson; Montagnese	Mano; Illangelo	4:02
6.	"Acquainted"	Tesfaye; Quenneville; Schofield; Montagnese; Diehl	Ben Billions; Illangelo; DaHeala; DannyBoyStyles; The Weeknd	5:48
7.	"Can't Feel My Face"	Tesfaye; Ali Payami; Savan Kotecha; Max Martin; Peter Svensson	Martin; Payami	3:33
8.	"Shameless"	Tesfaye; Svensson; Kotecha; Payami; Balshe	Martin; Payami; Svensson; The Weeknd^{[a]}	4:13
9.	"Earned It (Fifty Shades of Grey)"	Tesfaye; Moccio; Quenneville; Balshe	Moccio; DaHeala	4:37
10.	"In the Night"	Tesfaye; Balshe; Payami; Kotecha; Svensson; Martin	Martin; Payami; The Weeknd^{[a]}	3:55
11.	"As You Are"	Tesfaye; Balshe; Schofield; Quenneville; Montagnese	DaHeala; Illangelo; DannyBoyStyles; Ben Billions; The Weeknd	5:40
12.	"Dark Times" (featuring Ed Sheeran)	Tesfaye; Quenneville; Sheeran	Illangelo	4:20
13.	"Prisoner" (featuring Lana Del Rey)	Tesfaye; Del Rey; Montagnese	Illangelo; The Weeknd^{[a]}	4:34
14.	"Angel"	Tesfaye; Moccio; Schofield; Diehl	Moccio; The Weeknd	6:17
Total length:				65:06

Japanese bonus tracks
No.	Title	Writer(s)	Producer(s)	Length
15.	"Can't Feel My Face" (Martin Garrix Remix)	Tesfaye; Payami; Kotecha; Martin; Svensson	Martin; Payami; Martijn Garritsen^{[c]}	4:12
16.	"The Hills" (featuring Eminem)	Tesfaye; Marshall Mathers; Montagnese; Nickerson; Balshe	Mano; Illangelo	4:23
17.	"The Hills" (featuring Nicki Minaj)	Tesfaye; Onika Maraj; Montagnese; Nickerson; Balshe	Mano; Illangelo	4:02
Total length:				81:43

=== Notes ===
- ^{^[a]} signifies a co-producer
- ^{^[b]} signifies an additional producer
- ^{^[c]} signifies a remixer

=== Sample credits ===
- "Tell Your Friends" contains a sample of "Can't Stop Loving You", written by Carl Marshall and Robert Holmes, and performed by Soul Dog.
- "Often" contains a sample of "Ben Sana Vurgunum", performed by Nükhet Duru.

== Personnel ==
Credits adapted from album's liner notes.

- Klas Åhlund – synth guitar solo (track 8)
- Andy Barnes – mixing assistant (track 4)
- Jonathan Martin Berry – guitars (tracks 1, 9, 14)
- Cory Bice – assistant engineer (tracks 7, 8, 10)
- Jay Paul Bicknell – engineer (tracks 1, 9, 14), programming and keyboards (tracks 1, 14), additional programming (track 9)
- Ben Billions – producer (tracks 4, 6, 11)
- Edie Lehmann Boddicker – children's choir director (track 14)
- Christopher Bradford – children's choir (track 14)
- David Bukovinszky – cello (track 8)
- Paul Bushnell – bass (tracks 1, 9, 14)
- Mattias Bylund – strings arranging, engineering, and editing (track 8)
- Peter Carlsson – vocal editing (tracks 7, 8, 10)
- Vinnie Colaiuta – additional percussion (track 14)
- Tom Coyne – mastering (tracks 1–3, 5–14)
- DannyBoyStyles – producer (tracks 6, 11)
- Mike Dean – co-producer and guitar (track 3)
- Lana Del Rey – vocals (track 13)
- Greg Eliason – mixing assistant (tracks 1, 14)
- Vanessa Freebairn-Smith – cello (track 1)
- Kyle Gaffney – assistant engineer (track 14)
- Serban Ghenea – mixing (tracks 7, 8, 10)
- Noah Goldstein – additional production and engineer (track 3)
- Aria Gunn – children's choir (track 14)
- Levi Gunn – children's choir (track 14)
- John Hanes – mix engineer (tracks 7, 8, 10)
- Sam Holland – engineer (tracks 7, 8, 10)
- Brandon "Bizzy" Hollemon – guitars (track 4)
- Jean-Marie Horvat – mixing (track 4)
- Mattias Johansson – violin (track 8)
- Dave Kutch – mastering (track 4)
- Labrinth – vocals, producer, programming, and instrumentation (track 2)
- G.R.R. – arrangements (track 2)
- Karissa Lee – children's choir |(track 14)
- Micah Lee – children's choir (track 14)
- Shane Lee – children's choir (track 14)
- Jeremy Lertola – assistant engineer (tracks 7, 8, 10)
- Max Martin – producer and additional programming (tracks 7, 8, 10)
- Joe Matthews – children's choir (track 14)
- Elle Moccio – children's choir (track 14)
- Stephan Moccio – producer, programming, and piano (tracks 1, 9, 14); keyboards and background vocals (tracks 1, 14); arranger (track 9)
- Mano – producer (track 5)
- Carlo "Illangelo" Montagnese – executive producer, producer (tracks 2, 5, 6, 11–13), co-producer (track 3), engineer (tracks 3, 5, 6, 11–13), mixing (tracks 2, 3, 5, 6, 11–13)
- Maty Noyes – guest artist vocals and background vocals (track 14)
- Evin O'Cleary – assistant engineer (track 9)
- Zola Odessa – children's choir (track 14)
- Ali Payami – producer, programming, drums, synthesizers, keyboards, and bass (tracks 7, 8, 10)
- Christopher "Che" Pope – producer (track 3)
- Jason "DaHeala" Quenneville – executive producer, producer (tracks 1, 4, 6, 9, 11), co-producer (track 4), engineer (tracks 2–4, 12), programming (track 1), additional vocal engineering (track 9)
- Dave Reitzas – additional programming (track 9), mixing (tracks 1, 9, 14)
- Omar Riad – additional production (track 3)
- Ed Sheeran – vocals (track 12)
- Joshua Smith – additional engineering (tracks 2, 3, 11–13)
- Peter Svensson – producer (track 8), guitars and additional keyboards (track 7), acoustic guitar and keyboards (track 8)
- Abel "The Weeknd" Tesfaye – lead vocals, executive producer, producer (tracks 1–4, 6, 11, 14), co-producer (tracks 8, 10, 13), arranger (track 2), programming (track 1), background vocals (tracks 1, 14)
- Claira Titman – children's choir (track 14)
- Emily Titman – children's choir (track 14)
- Kanye West – producer and background vocals (track 3)

== Charts ==
=== Weekly charts ===
Weekly chart performanc
Chart (2015–2016)	Peak position
Australian Albums (ARIA)	1
Austrian Albums (Ö3 Austria)	7
Belgian Albums (Ultratop Flanders)	2
Belgian Albums (Ultratop Wallonia)	10
Canadian Albums (Billboard)	1
Czech Albums (ČNS IFPI)	45
Danish Albums (Hitlisten)	2
Dutch Albums (Album Top 100)	2
Finnish Albums (Suomen virallinen lista)	12
French Albums (SNEP)	6
German Albums (Offizielle Top 100)	7
Greek Albums (IFPI)	14
Irish Albums (IRMA)	2
Italian Albums (FIMI)	21
Japanese Hot Albums (Billboard Japan)	67
Japanese Albums (Oricon)	37
Mexican Albums (AMPROFON)	16
New Zealand Albums (RMNZ)	2
Norwegian Albums (VG-lista)	1
Polish Albums (ZPAV)	21
Portuguese Albums (AFP)	7
Scottish Albums (Official Charts)	3
Slovak Albums (ČNS IFPI)	52
South Korean Albums (Circle)	60
South Korean International Albums (Circle)	8
Spanish Albums (Promusicae)	23
Swedish Albums (Sverigetopplistan)	1
Swiss Albums (Schweizer Hitparade)	4
Taiwanese Albums (Five Music)	4
UK Albums (Official Charts)	1
UK R&B Albums (Official Charts)	1
US Billboard 200	1
US Top R&B/Hip-Hop Albums (Billboard)	1

=== Year-end charts ===
2015 year-end chart performance
Chart (2015)	Position
Australian Albums (ARIA)	15
Australian Urban Albums (ARIA)	2
Belgian Albums (Ultratop Flanders)	89
Canadian Albums (Billboard)	9
Danish Albums (Hitlisten)	12
Dutch Albums (MegaCharts)	82
French Albums (SNEP)	98
Mexican Albums (AMPROFON)	96
New Zealand Albums (RMNZ)	47
South Korean International Albums (Circle)	84
Swedish Albums (Sverigetopplistan)	7
UK Albums (OCC)	26
US Billboard 200	13
US Top R&B/Hip-Hop Albums (Billboard)	5
Worldwide Albums (IFPI Global Music Report)	10

2016 year-end chart performance
Chart (2016)	Position
Australian Albums (ARIA)	50
Australian Urban Albums (ARIA)	8
Canadian Albums (Billboard)	5
Danish Albums (Hitlisten)	15
Dutch Albums (MegaCharts)	54
French Albums (SNEP)	93
Icelandic Albums (Plötutíóindi)	85
New Zealand Albums (RMNZ)	36
South Korean International Albums (Circle)	67
Swedish Albums (Sverigetopplistan)	19
UK Albums (OCC)	37
US Billboard 200	9
US Top R&B/Hip-Hop Albums (Billboard)	4

2017 year-end chart performance
Chart (2017)	Position
Australian Hip Hop/R&B Albums (ARIA)	19
Danish Albums (Hitlisten)	40
New Zealand Albums (RMNZ)	49
Swedish Albums (Sverigetopplistan)	42
US Billboard 200	47
US Top R&B/Hip-Hop Albums (Billboard)	26

2018 year-end chart performance
Chart (2018)	Position
Australian Hip Hop/R&B Albums (ARIA)	33
Danish Albums (Hitlisten)	90
Swedish Albums (Sverigetopplistan)	81
US Billboard 200	86
US Top R&B/Hip-Hop Albums (Billboard)	60

2019 year-end chart performance
Chart (2019)	Position
Australian Hip Hop/R&B Albums (ARIA)	33
US Billboard 200	123

2020 year-end chart performance
Chart (2020)	Position
Australian Hip Hop/R&B Albums (ARIA)	31
Belgian Albums (Ultratop Flanders)	147
Swedish Albums (Sverigetopplistan)	92
US Billboard 200	97
US Top R&B/Hip-Hop Albums (Billboard)	100

2021 year-end chart performance
Chart (2021)	Position
Australian Hip Hop/R&B Albums (ARIA)	45
Belgian Albums (Ultratop Flanders)	181
Danish Albums (Hitlisten)	83
Swedish Albums (Sverigetopplistan)	100
US Top R&B/Hip-Hop Albums (Billboard)	87

2022 year-end chart performance
Chart (2022)	Position
Australian Hip Hop/R&B Albums (ARIA)	44
Lithuanian Albums (AGATA)	78

2023 year-end chart performance
Chart (2023)	Position
Australian Hip Hop/R&B Albums (ARIA)	37
Belgian Albums (Ultratop Flanders)	151

2024 year-end chart performance
Chart (2024)	Position
Australian Hip Hop/R&B Albums (ARIA)	44
US Billboard 200	183
US Top R&B/Hip-Hop Albums (Billboard)	79

2025 year-end chart performance
Chart (2025)	Position
US Billboard 200	132
US Top R&B/Hip-Hop Albums (Billboard)	43

=== Decade-end charts ===
Decade-end chart performance
Chart (2010–2019)	Position
US Billboard 200	36

== Certifications ==
Certifications and sales thresholds
Region	Certification	Certified units/sales
Australia (ARIA)	2× Platinum	140,000^{‡}
Austria (IFPI Austria)	Platinum	15,000^{*}
Canada (Music Canada)	7× Platinum	560,000^{‡}
Denmark (IFPI Danmark)	5× Platinum	100,000^{‡}
Germany (BVMI)	Gold	100,000^{‡}
Italy (FIMI)	Platinum	50,000^{‡}
Mexico (AMPROFON)	Platinum+Gold	90,000^{‡}
New Zealand (RMNZ)	3× Platinum	45,000^{‡}
Norway (IFPI Norway)	Gold	15,000^{‡}
Poland (ZPAV)	Platinum	20,000^{‡}
Singapore (RIAS)	Gold	5,000^{*}
Sweden (GLF)	Platinum	40,000^{‡}
United Kingdom (BPI)	2× Platinum	786,366
United States (RIAA)	6× Platinum	6,000,000^{‡}
^{*} Sales figures based on certification alone.^{‡} Sales+streaming figures based on certification alone.

== Release history ==
Release dates and formats
Region	Date	Label(s)	Format(s)	Ref.
United States	August 28, 2015	XO; Republic	CD; digital download; vinyl; cassette	

== See also ==
- List of number-one albums of 2015 (Australia)
- List of number-one albums of 2015 (Canada)
- List of UK Albums Chart number ones of the 2010s
- List of UK R&B Albums Chart number ones of 2015
- List of Billboard 200 number-one albums of 2015
- List of Billboard number-one R&B/hip-hop albums of 2015
