= Dark Times =

Dark Times may refer to:

- Star Wars: Dark Times, a 2006 comic book mini-series published by Dark Horse Comics
- "Dark Times", a song by Shihad from Love Is the New Hate, 2005
- "Dark Times" (The Weeknd song), 2015
- Dark Times (album), an album by Vince Staples, 2024
