= Dark Times (The Weeknd song) =

Song by the Weeknd featuring Ed Sheeran

from the album Beauty Behind the Madness
- Released: August 28, 2015
- Studio: Conway (Hollywood)
- Genre: R&B
- Length: 4:20
- Label: XO; Republic
- Songwriters: Abel Tesfaye; Edward Sheeran; Jason Quenneville
- Producer: Illangelo

"Dark Times" is a song by Canadian singer-songwriter the Weeknd featuring English singer-songwriter Ed Sheeran recorded for the former's second studio album, Beauty Behind the Madness (2015). It was released by XO and Republic Records as the twelfth track from the album on August 28, 2015. Written by the Weeknd, Sheeran, and DaHeala, and produced by Illangelo, it is an R&B song that touches on themes of temptation and acceptance.

"Dark Times" received generally negative reviews from music critics, who criticized its composition and style. Nonetheless, it was commercially successful, charting in multiple countries and being certified platinum in Canada and the United States, silver in the United Kingdom, and gold in New Zealand. In year-end charts, it finished number 40 on the Hot R&B Songs chart. It was included in the set list for the Weeknd's fourth concert tour, The Madness Fall Tour (2015).

== Background ==
The Weeknd was mainly noted for his dark R&B music up until 2015, observable in his first three mixtapes released during 2011 and his debut studio album, Kiss Land. Released in 2013, Kiss Land was reviewed positively by critics and charted at number 2 on the Billboard 200. Despite this, the album was considered a commercial underperformance due to its failure to spawn successful singles and expand the Weeknd's fanbase. In his disappointment, the Weeknd approached Republic Records' head of urban A&R, Wendy Goldstein, for assistance.

The Weeknd also executive-produced the album with Illangelo, with whom he worked on his first three mixtapes, and DaHeala. Illangelo received production credits for 7 of the 14 tracks on the album, producing "Dark Times" and "Prisoner" alone. For the rest of his production, Illangelo applied finishing touches, which required either major or minor effort. Sheeran and the Weeknd created the song together on the spot. In an interview with GQ, the Weeknd said:

I wrote a song with Ed Sheeran that was kind of spontaneous. He was hosting the Much Music Awards in Toronto and I invited him, and pretty much the entire awards show, to my condo to party. It went on until about 5 in the morning but we didn't write the song until that next day, so you can imagine how that night went. Ed also did a freestyle battle with Waka Flocka in my kitchen. That was pretty dope. Good times.

== Composition ==
"Dark Times" was written by the Weeknd, DaHeala, and Ed Sheeran, and produced by Illangelo. Described by critics as a "bluesy" duet, it touches on themes of temptation and acceptance. According to Mic, the song highlights "the pitfalls of achieving sex-symbol status among their peers and audiences, as well as the nasty side-effects of partying and taking too many drugs".

== Reception ==
"Dark Times" received generally negative reviews from music critics. Sheldon Pearce of The A.V. Club said it "falls flat because of its mishmash components". Matthew Cooper of Clash called it "a forgettable bluesy number where poor old Ed tries his best to convince us he's ever gotten into a fight". Helen Brown of The Daily Telegraph called it "tedious". Kyle Anderson of Entertainment Weekly said, "And when Tesfaye teams with Ed Sheeran on 'Dark Times,' the result is a confounding imitation of Imagine Dragons' arena-rock schlock". Jim Farber of the New York Daily News noted that Sheeran "brings a hard blues guitar" to it, calling it "much more convincing than the role he's forced to play in the lyrics, as theh world's least likely bad boy". Kitty Empire of The Observer called it "boringly retro". Andrew Ryce of Pitchfork called it "mind-numbingly boring". Milly McMahon of Stereoboard said the two artists "come together beautifully", describing it as "a truly complementary duet".

"Dark Times" peaked at number 91 on the Billboard Hot 100, and peaked at number 35 on the Hot R&B/Hip-Hop Songs chart. It also appeared on various national charts, peaking at number 92 on the UK Singles chart, number 19 on the UK Hip Hop and R&B Singles chart, number 73 in Ireland, and number 60 in Sweden. In year-end charts, it finished number 40 on the Hot R&B Songs chart. "Dark Times" was certified platinum in the United States, silver in the United Kingdom, and gold in Canada and New Zealand.

== Live performances ==
Sheeran and the Weeknd performed the song live together for the first time during The Madness Fall Tour at the Air Canada Centre in Toronto. Before they performed, the Weeknd told the audience, "I've written with a lot of people in my life, but Ed Sheeran is the fastest and most talented songwriter ever".

== Charts ==
=== Weekly charts ===
Weekly chart performance
Chart (2015)	Peak position
Ireland (IRMA)	73
Sweden (Sverigetopplistan)	60
UK Singles (Official Charts)	92
UK Hip Hop/R&B (Official Charts)	19
US Billboard Hot 100	91
US Hot R&B/Hip-Hop Songs (Billboard)	35

=== Year-end charts ===
Year-end chart performance
Chart (2015)	Position
US Hot R&B Songs (Billboard)	40

== Certifications ==
Certifications
Region	Certification	Certified units/sales
Canada (Music Canada)	Platinum	80,000^{‡}
New Zealand (RMNZ)	Gold	15,000^{‡}
United Kingdom (BPI)	Silver	200,000^{‡}
United States (RIAA)	Platinum	1,000,000^{‡}
^{‡} Sales+streaming figures based on certification alone.
