= Fifty Shades of Grey (soundtrack) =

Fifty Shades of Grey (Original Motion Picture Soundtrack)

Soundtrack album by Various artists
- Released: February 10, 2015
- Length: 61:41
- Label: Republic
- Producers: Various: Mike Stevens; Annie Lennox; Emile Haynie; Stephan Moccio; Jason "DaHeala" Quenneville; Dave Okumu; Max Martin; Ali Payami; Boots; Beyoncé Knowles; Michael Diamond; Oliver Kraus; The Glimmer Twins; Aaron Bruno; Dave Cavanaugh; Barney Freeman; Ben Vella; Blythe Pepino; Mike Dean; Dan Heath; Danny Elfman; Leon "RoccStar" Youngblood; Ben Tanner

Singles from Fifty Shades of Grey
- 1. "Earned It" Released: December 23, 2014; 2. "Love Me like You Do" Released: January 7, 2015; 3. "Crazy in Love (2014 Remix)" Released: February 10, 2015

Fifty Shades of Grey (Original Motion Picture Soundtrack) is the soundtrack to the film of the same name adapted from E. L. James's eponymous novel that was released through Republic Records on February 10, 2015. It was the seventh best-selling album of 2015 with 2.2 million copies sold worldwide.

== Background ==
Meetings about the album took place nearly two years prior the album's release when plans of a film were announced. Mike Knobloch, president of film music and publishing at Universal said: "We really wanted the songs to be part of the fiber of the film — nothing crowbarred in or just auxiliary to the experience. There was a very deliberate effort to create as much original material as possible, to tailor the production, the lyrics, and the performance."

Beyoncé was one of the first singers approached for the film. Knobloch said: "She thought it was an opportunity to do something that aligned nicely with her brand and agenda." Sia was approached by Knobloch and music supervisor Dana Sano with a scene they had in mind: "It's a pivotal moment, when the two protagonists have an ecstatic and intimate first sexual encounter. [Sia] played us songs and we would say, 'That's good, but could it be more of this, or less of that?'. By the end we left her spinning her wheels about what she had to do to deliver just the right song to us for the film." The Weeknd was involved in the project very early. Tom Mackay, a manager at Republic Records, explained: "He worked on a number of songs for a number of scenes. Some were working and some weren't, but he just kept at it, and kept at it, and kept at it. In the end, he wrote 'Earned It' and it's the biggest song of his career to date. It's the only song that's in the movie twice."

On January 12, 2015, E. L. James announced the soundtrack would be released on February 10, 2015.

== Singles ==
The soundtrack was preceded by the release of two singles. "Earned It" by Canadian singer the Weeknd was released as the album's lead single on December 23, 2014, peaked at number three on the US Billboard Hot 100 and was included on his second album Beauty Behind the Madness. "Love Me like You Do" by English singer Ellie Goulding was released as the second single on January 7, 2015; it reached number one on the national charts of 16 countries including the UK Singles Chart, and peaked at number three on the Hot 100 and was included on her third album Delirium.

=== Promotional singles ===
"Salted Wound" by Sia was released as the first promotional single on January 27, 2015. Two further promotional singles, "One Last Night" by Vaults and "I Know You" by Skylar Grey, were released on February 3, 2015. "I'm on Fire", a Bruce Springsteen cover performed by Awolnation, was released as the fourth promotional single on February 9, 2015.

== Reception ==
=== Commercial performance ===
The album debuted at number two on the Billboard 200 with sales of 258,000 units (210,000 copies of traditional albums) in its first week behind Drake's If You're Reading This It's Too Late. As of January 2017, it had sold 913,000 copies in the United States.

The album debuted at number two on the Canadian Albums Chart, selling 18,000 copies. As of July 2015, it had sold 89,000 copies in the country.

=== Critical reception ===
Professional ratings
Aggregate scores
Source	Rating
Metacritic	65/100
Review scores
Source	Rating
AllMusic	3/5 stars
Billboard	3.5/5 stars
Los Angeles Times	2/4 stars
Newsday	B−
New York Daily News	3/5 stars
New York Post	1/4 stars
Rolling Stone	3/5 stars
USA Today	3/4 stars

In contrast to the near-universal panning of the film, its soundtrack has received generally favorable reviews from music critics. At Metacritic, which assigns a normalized rating out of 100 to reviews from mainstream critics, the soundtrack received an average score of 65, based on 7 reviews. Kenneth Partridge of Billboard rated the soundtrack three-and-a-half out of five stars, writing that the soundtrack "wisely skews mainstream". Chuck Arnold of Rolling Stone compared the soundtrack to those of The Twilight Saga and The Hunger Games while noting that the Weeknd's "Earned It" brings "Bond-theme drama" to the soundtrack. However, AllMusic's Stephen Thomas Erlewine described the soundtrack as "suitable for any romantic evening" and a seduction. Jim Farber of the New York Daily News claimed that the lyrics speak of "romanticized sex", while highlighting the album's "soft-edged production". Writing for ABC News, Allan Raible described the soundtrack as a collection of "sultry electro blues pop", but criticized the inclusions of older publications. Mikael Wood of the Los Angeles Times called the soundtrack a "slog" and criticized the album's midtempo tracks, while comparing the album's commercial performance to that of Taylor Swift's 1989.

== Track listing ==
Fifty Shades of Grey — Standard edition
No.	Title	Writer(s)	Producer(s)	Length
1.	"I Put a Spell on You" (Fifty Shades of Grey) (performed by Annie Lennox)	Screamin' Jay Hawkins	Mike Stevens; Annie Lennox	3:30
2.	"Undiscovered" (performed by Laura Welsh)	Emile Haynie; Dev Hynes; Laura Welsh; Amanda Ghost	Haynie	2:53
3.	"Earned It (Fifty Shades of Grey)" (performed by the Weeknd)	Abel Tesfaye; Stephan Moccio; Jason "DaHeala" Quenneville; Ahmad Balshe	Moccio; Quenneville	4:10
4.	"Meet Me in the Middle" (performed by Jessie Ware)	Dave Okumu; Jessie Ware; Aaron Ward	Okumu	5:08
5.	"Love Me like You Do" (performed by Ellie Goulding)	Max Martin; Savan Kotecha; Ilya Salmanzadeh; Ali Payami; Tove Nilsson	Martin; Payami	4:10
6.	"Haunted" (performed by Beyoncé) (Michael Diamond Remix)	Boots; Beyoncé Knowles	Boots; Knowles^{[a]}; Michael Diamond^{[b]}	5:08
7.	"Salted Wound" (performed by Sia)	Brian West; Gerald Eaton; Sia Furler; Oliver Kraus	Kraus	4:30
8.	"Beast of Burden" (performed by the Rolling Stones)	Mick Jagger; Keith Richards	The Glimmer Twins	3:29
9.	"I'm on Fire" (performed by Awolnation)	Bruce Springsteen	Aaron Bruno	2:34
10.	"Crazy in Love (2014 Remix)" (performed by Beyoncé)	Knowles; Rich Harrison; Shawn Carter; Eugene Record	Boots^{[c]}	3:46
11.	"Witchcraft" (performed by Frank Sinatra)	Cy Coleman; Carolyn Leigh	Dave Cavanaugh	2:51
12.	"One Last Night" (performed by Vaults)	Barnabas Freeman; Benjamin Vella; Blythe Pepino	Barney Freeman; Ben Vella; Pepino	3:19
13.	"Where You Belong" (performed by the Weeknd)	Tesfaye; Mike Dean; Balshe	Dean	4:57
14.	"I Know You" (performed by Skylar Grey)	Moccio; Skylar Grey	Dan Heath; Moccio^{[d]}	4:58
15.	"Ana and Christian" (performed by Danny Elfman)	Danny Elfman	Danny Elfman	3:24
16.	"Did That Hurt?" (performed by Danny Elfman)	Elfman	Elfman	2:54
Total length:				61:41

Fifty Shades of Grey — Target deluxe edition (bonus tracks)
No.	Title	Writer(s)	Producer(s)	Length
17.	"Rude" (performed by Terence Coles and Leon "RoccStar" Youngblood)	Leon Youngblood	Leon "RoccStar" Youngblood	3:30
18.	"Call Me" (performed by St. Paul and the Broken Bones)	Paul Janeway; Jesse Phillips; Browan Lollar; Andrew Lee; Allen Branstetter; Ben Griner	Ben Tanner	2:51
Total length:				68:02

Notes

- ^{^[a]} signifies a vocal producer
- ^{^[b]} signifies a remixer
- ^{^[c]} signifies a remixer and main producer
- ^{^[d]} signifies a co-producer
- "Crazy in Love (2014 Remix)" contains samples from "Are You My Woman (Tell Me So)", written by Eugene Record and performed by The Chi-Lites.

== Credits ==
Credits for the soundtrack adapted from AllMusic.

- Graham Archer - additional production, programming
- AWOLNATION - primary artist, vocals
- Ahmad Balshe - composer
- Steve Bartek - orchestration
- Jonathan Martin Berry - guitar
- Beyoncé - featured artist, primary artist
- Jay Bicknell - engineer, programming
- Alison Bjorkedal - harp, instrumentation, programming
- Simon Bloor - guitar, keyboards
- Boots - composer, engineer, instrumentation, producer, remix producer, string arrangements, vocals (background)
- Richard Brook - percussion
- Sandy Brummels - art direction, package design
- Aaron Bruno - instrumentation, mixing, primary artist, producer, programming
- David Bukovinszky - cello
- Paul Bushnell - bass
- Mattias Bylund - editing, engineer, string arrangements, strings
- Peter Carlsson - vocal editing, vocals (background)
- Shawn Carter - composer
- Dave Cavanaugh - producer
- Michael Chaves - guitar, instrumentation, omnichord, programming
- Adam Christgau - instrumentation, percussion, programming
- Philip Cohen - music business affairs
- Cy Coleman - composer
- Martin Cooke - engineer
- Jason Cooper - drums, instrumentation, programming
- Rich Costey - mixing
- Mike Dean - composer, drums, engineer, guitar, keyboards, mixing, producer, programming
- Michael Diamond - remixing
- Derek Dixie - mixing consultant
- Gerald Eaton - composer
- Danny Elfman - composer, primary artist, producer
- Mike Fennel - engineer
- Simon Finch - trumpet
- Nicolas Fournier - engineer
- Robin Fredriksson - vocals (background)
- Vanessa Freebairn-Smith - cello
- Barnabas Freeman - composer
- Barney Freeman - producer, programming
- Sia Furler - composer, instrumentation, programming, vocals
- Brian Gardner - mastering
- Serban Ghenea - mixing
- Amanda Ghost - composer
- Oscar Görres - vocals (background)
- Ellie Goulding - primary artist, vocals
- Skylar Grey - composer, featured artist, primary artist, vocals
- John Hanes - engineer
- Rich Harrison - composer
- Jay Hawkins - composer
- Emile Haynie - composer, producer
- Dan Heath - producer
- Justin Hergett - mixing assistant
- Chris Hill - guitar (bass)
- Hit-Boy - drum programming
- Sam Holland - engineer
- Oscar Holter - vocals (background)
- Ivan Hussey - cello
- Stephen Hussey - orchestration, viola, violin
- Devonté Hynes - composer
- Mick Jagger - composer, vocals, vocals (background)
- Mattias Johansson - violin
- Jessica Kelly - art direction, package design
- Mike Knobloch - executive in charge of music
- Beyoncé Knowles - composer, producer, vocal producer
- Savan Kotecha - composer, vocals (background)
- Oliver Kraus - cello, composer, instrumentation, producer, programming
- James Krausse - mixing assistant
- Mattias Larsson - vocals (background)
- Carolyn Leigh - composer
- Annie Lennox - featured artist, percussion, piano, primary artist, string arrangements, vocals
- Rachel Levy - music supervisor
- Tom MacKay - A&R
- Blake Mares - assistant engineer
- Margot - string arrangements
- Andre Marsh - A&R
- Max Martin - bass, composer, drums, keyboards, percussion, producer, programming, vocals (background)
- Tony Maserati - mixing
- Stephan Moccio - arranger, composer, keyboards, piano, producer, programming
- Yoad Nevo - mixing
- Tove Nilsson - composer
- Evin O'Cleary - assistant engineer
- Dave Okumu - composer, engineer, instrumentation, producer, programming
- Ali Payami - bass, composer, drums, keyboards, percussion, producer, programming, vocals (background)
- Blythe Pepino - composer, producer, programming
- Jason "DaHeala" Queeneville - composer, engineer, producer, vocal engineer
- Eugene Record - composer
- Dave Reitzas - mixing
- Keith Richards - composer, guitar, vocals, vocals (background)
- Ramon Rivas - engineer, mixing assistant
- Eric Robinson - engineer
- Kate Robinson - violin
- The Rolling Stones - featured artist, primary artist
- Ilya Salmanzadeh - composer, vocals (background)
- Dana Sano - soundtrack producer
- Sia - featured artist, primary artist
- Jo Silverston - cello
- Frank Sinatra - primary artist, vocals
- Noah Snyder - engineer, mixing
- Ludvig Söderberg - vocals (background)
- Bruce Springsteen - composer
- Eric Stenman - engineer, mixing
- Mike Stevens - guitar, keyboards, mixing, organ (hammond), programming, string arrangements
- Jordan Stilwell - engineer
- Rob Suchecki - assistant engineer
- Patricia Sullivan - mastering
- Sean Tallman - engineer
- Abel Tesfaye - composer, vocals
- Nicol Thomson - trombone
- Urban Soul Orchestra - string engineer
- Vaults - primary artist
- Ben Vella - producer, programming
- Benjamin Vella - composer
- Jessica Ware - composer
- Jessie Ware - primary artist, vocals
- Charlie Watts - drums
- The Weeknd - primary artist, vocals
- Laura Welsh - composer, primary artist, vocals
- Brian West - composer
- Stuart White - engineer, mixing, vocal engineer
- Neal Wilkinson - drums
- Ron Wood - guitar, vocals, vocals (background)
- Bill Wyman - guitar (bass)

== Charts ==
=== Weekly charts ===
Chart (2015)	Peak position
Argentinian Albums (CAPIF)	4
Australian Albums (ARIA)	1
Austrian Albums (Ö3 Austria)	1
Belgian Albums (Ultratop Flanders)	1
Belgian Albums (Ultratop Wallonia)	5
Brazilian Albums (ABPD)	5
Canadian Albums (Billboard)	1
Czech Albums (ČNS IFPI)	3
Danish Albums (Hitlisten)	2
Dutch Albums (Album Top 100)	7
Finnish Albums (Suomen virallinen lista)	13
French Albums (SNEP)	3
German Albums (Offizielle Top 100)	1
Greek Albums (IFPI)	2
Hungarian Albums (MAHASZ)	3
Irish Compilation Albums (IRMA)	1
Italian Compilation Albums (FIMI)	2
Japanese Albums (Oricon)	184
Mexican Albums (AMPROFON)	1
New Zealand Albums (RMNZ)	2
Norwegian Albums (VG-lista)	2
Polish Albums (ZPAV)	1
Russian Albums (2M)	1
Spanish Albums (Promusicae)	4
Swiss Albums (Schweizer Hitparade)	1
UK Compilation Albums (Official Charts)	1
US Billboard 200	2
US Soundtrack Albums (Billboard)	1

=== Year-end charts ===
Chart (2015)	Position
Australian Albums (ARIA)	13
Austrian Albums (Ö3 Austria)	16
Belgian Albums (Ultratop Flanders)	18
Belgian Albums (Ultratop Wallonia)	24
Canadian Albums (Billboard)	11
Danish Albums (Hitlisten)	17
Dutch Albums (MegaCharts)	63
French Albums (SNEP)	20
German Albums (Offizielle Top 100)	21
Hungarian Albums (MAHASZ)	50
Italian Compilation Albums (FIMI)	4
New Zealand Albums (RMNZ)	24
Polish Albums (ZPAV)	2
Russian Albums (2M)	1
Spanish Albums (PROMUSICAE)	48
Swiss Albums (Schweizer Hitparade)	10
US Billboard 200	9
US Soundtrack Albums (Billboard)	1

Chart (2016)	Position
French Albums (SNEP)	184
US Soundtrack Albums (Billboard)	9

=== Decade-end charts ===
Chart (2010–2019)	Position
US Billboard 200	114

== Certifications ==
Region	Certification	Certified units/sales
Australia (ARIA)	Platinum	70,000^{‡}
Austria (IFPI Austria)	Platinum	15,000^{*}
Belgium (BRMA)	Gold	15,000^{*}
Brazil (Pro-Música Brasil)	Gold	20,000^{*}
Canada (Music Canada)	Platinum	89,000
Denmark (IFPI Danmark)	Platinum	20,000^{‡}
France (SNEP)	Platinum	100,000^{*}
Germany (BVMI)	Platinum	200,000^{‡}
Mexico (AMPROFON)	Platinum	60,000^{^}
Poland (ZPAV)	3× Platinum	60,000^{‡}
Sweden (GLF)	Platinum	40,000^{‡}
Switzerland (IFPI Switzerland)	Gold	10,000^{^}
United Kingdom (BPI)	Platinum	300,000^{‡}
United States (RIAA)	Platinum	1,000,000
^{*} Sales figures based on certification alone.^{^} Shipments figures based on certification alone.^{‡} Sales+streaming figures based on certification alone.

== See also ==
- Danny Elfman discography
