= Acquainted =

Single by the Weeknd

from the album Beauty Behind the Madness
- Released: November 17, 2015
- Recorded: 2015
- Studio: Jungle City Studios
- Genre: Alternative R&B; trap
- Length: 5:49 (album version); 4:06 (radio edit)
- Label: XO; Republic
- Songwriters: Abel Tesfaye; Jason Quenneville; Danny Schofield; Carlo Montagnese; Ben Diehl
- Producers: The Weeknd; Illangelo; Ben Billions; Jason Quenneville; Danny Boy Styles

The Weeknd singles chronology
"Can't Feel My Face" (2015)	"In The Night" / "Acquainted" (2015)	"Might Not" (2015)

"Acquainted" is a song by the Canadian singer-songwriter the Weeknd, from his second studio album, Beauty Behind the Madness (2015). It was sent to urban contemporary stations on November 17, 2015, by XO and Republic Records, serving as the album's fifth single. He wrote and produced the song with DaHeala, DannyBoyStyles, Illangelo, and Ben Billions.

== Background and promotion ==
In May 2015, multiple tracks from the Weeknd were leaked, including a song titled "Girls Born in the '90s", which was the original version of "Acquainted". Following this, the song was heavily reworked before the release of Beauty Behind the Madness.

After being released on August 28, 2015, as the sixth track from Beauty Behind the Madness, the song was promoted to urban contemporary radio on November 17, 2015, serving as the album's fifth and final single, and would be further promoted to the rhythmic contemporary format on February 16, 2016. The song was later intended to impact contemporary hit radio on April 12, 2016, but its release never occurred.

== Composition and lyrics ==
The song is written in the key of G minor with a moderate tempo of 106 beats per minute in common time. The song alternates between the chords Gm and F, and the vocals span from F_{3} to C_{6}.

The song has the Weeknd sing about vulnerability relating to whether a commitment to real love might be a risk worth taking, and questionably hints at something more than just sex.

== Music video ==
The music video was directed by Australian filmographer Nabil Elderkin. Production commenced on February 9, 2016, but the video was never officially released.

== Charts ==
=== Weekly charts ===
Chart (2015–2016)	Peak position
Australia (ARIA)	96
Canada Hot 100 (Billboard)	79
UK Singles (Official Charts)	90
US Billboard Hot 100	60
US Hot R&B/Hip-Hop Songs (Billboard)	21
US R&B/Hip-Hop Airplay (Billboard)	14
US Rhythmic Airplay (Billboard)	12

=== Year-end charts ===
Chart (2015)	Position
US Hot R&B Songs (Billboard)	31

Chart (2016)	Position
US Hot R&B/Hip-Hop Songs (Billboard)	81

== Certifications ==
Region	Certification	Certified units/sales
Australia (ARIA)	Platinum	70,000^{‡}
Brazil (Pro-Música Brasil)	Gold	30,000^{‡}
Canada (Music Canada)	Platinum	80,000^{‡}
Denmark (IFPI Danmark)	Gold	45,000^{‡}
New Zealand (RMNZ)	Platinum	30,000^{‡}
United Kingdom (BPI)	Gold	400,000^{‡}
United States (RIAA)	4× Platinum	4,000,000^{‡}
^{‡} Sales+streaming figures based on certification alone.

== Release history ==
Country	Date	Format	Label	Ref.
United States	November 17, 2015	Urban contemporary radio	XO; Republic	
United States	February 16, 2016	Rhythmic contemporary	XO; Republic	
