= Love Me Harder =

2014 single by Ariana Grande and the Weeknd

Single by Ariana Grande and the Weeknd

from the album My Everything
- B-side: "Be My Baby"; "Cadillac Song"; "Too Close"
- Released: September 30, 2014
- Recorded: May 2014
- Studio: Conway Recording Studios, Los Angeles; Wolf Cousins Studio, Stockholm; P.S. Studio, Stockholm; Studio at the Palms, Las Vegas
- Genre: Pop; synthwave; synth-pop; R&B
- Length: 3:56
- Label: Republic
- Songwriters: Max Martin; Savan Kotecha; Peter Svensson; Ali Payami; Abel Tesfaye; Ahmad Balshe
- Producers: Ali Payami; Peter Svensson

Ariana Grande singles chronology
| "Bang Bang" (2014) | "Love Me Harder" (2014) | "Santa Tell Me" (2014) |

The Weeknd singles chronology
| "Often" (2014) | "Love Me Harder" (2014) | "Earned It" (2014) |

Music video
- "Love Me Harder" on YouTube

Alternative cover

"Love Me Harder" is a song by the American singer-songwriter Ariana Grande and the Canadian singer-songwriter the Weeknd. It was released by Republic Records on September 30, 2014, as the fourth single from Grande's second studio album, My Everything (2014). It was written by the Weeknd, Max Martin, Savan Kotecha, Peter Svensson, Ali Payami and Belly. The song was produced by Payami and Peter Carlsson, with Svensson serving as a vocal producer. Sonically, "Love Me Harder" is a synthwave tinged pop, synth-pop and R&B ballad with a "throbbing, electro-heavy chorus", a guitar riff and "big vacuum-esque synths". Lyrically, the song features double entendres about rough sex.

In the United States, the song peaked at number seven on the Billboard Hot 100, becoming Grande's fourth consecutive top-ten single off the album and making her the artist with the most top-ten singles in 2014. The song also became the Weeknd's first top ten entry in the US. The song also reached the top ten in Canada, Colombia, and South Africa. The Hannah Lux Davis-directed video finds Grande writhing on a sandy floor and the Weeknd walking through a rainstorm. As of 2020, the song had sold 1.3 million copies in the United States, and has since been certified quintuple platinum by the RIAA. The song has over 1.5 billion streams on Spotify.

== Background and release ==
The collaboration between Grande and the Weeknd was pushed by their mutual label, Republic Records. Grande and the Weeknd were up-and-coming artists in 2013, with both releasing their debut albums that year. In an interview with Billboard, Republic Records executive vice president Charlie Walk stated, "The Weeknd is positioned to be best new artist of 2014. He is that guy." Producer Max Martin sent the Weeknd an unfinished version of the track. According to the Weeknd, "It was a great song, but it was a little generic. I couldn't hear myself on it. So I changed it and made it dark." Martin liked the Weeknd's revised lyrics. The Weeknd later recalled that "It was kind of like the label giving me an alley-oop. I think that's where the stars aligned for me. When I see an opening I penetrate it." In June 2014, Walk posted a photo on his Instagram with the caption, "When you talk about artist development and pure talent, the Weeknd comes to mind. I just heard a duet with a female friend of ours that's a global smash. Can't wait for the fall!." Later, it was revealed that the collaborator was Ariana Grande.

Later, Walk admitted that the collaboration was part of a strategy to promote the Weeknd, saying, "It's no accident that the new Ariana track features The Weeknd. That's strategic, because he's about to blow up with his own record." On June 30, 2014, it was revealed the track list for Grande's second studio album and the collaboration with The Weeknd was called "Love Me Harder". The song was first teased during a post on Grande's Instagram account, where she shared a 15-second snippet of the track on August 4, 2014, and later during a preview of four tracks on MTV's website on August 20, 2014. Chris Martins of Spin thought the preview has Grande getting "downright nasty" on the track. Later, "Love Me Harder" was announced to be the album's fourth single, being serviced to US rhythmic-crossover radio on September 30, 2014.

== Composition ==
"Love Me Harder"
A 23-second sample of "Love Me Harder" by Ariana Grande, where the chorus is heard.

"Love Me Harder" was written by Max Martin, Savan Kotecha, Peter Svensson, Ali Payami, Abel Tesfaye and the rapper Belly. It was produced by Payami and Peter Carlsson, while Svensson provided vocal production. The song is a duet sung between Grande and The Weeknd. Sheet music for this song shows four sharps with a suggested tempo of "moderately" in common time. Grande's vocals range from the note of E_{3} to F♯_{5}. It is a midtempo synthwave tinged pop, synth-pop and R&B ballad, which starts small and mellow, before having "a 'throbbing', electro-heavy chorus", with a guitar riff, while "big vacuum-esque synths zip" are heard throughout the track. Meanwhile, Richard S. He from Billboard described the song as "A sparkling synthwave-R&B track that teeters on the edge of explicit—and is all the more seductive for it". Rob Copsey wrote for The Official Charts Company that "Love Me Harder" is reminiscent of Drake's "most emotional" songs like "Find Your Love" (2010) and "Hold On, We're Going Home" (2013), while Nick Levine of Time Out called the song a "cross between Robyn and Mariah Carey".

Lyrically, the song has Grande demanding for romantic satisfaction, filled with double entendres about rough sex. In the beginning, Grande wants a man to "utterly satisfy her in moments of breath taking, space invading, pleasure, pain, lip biting and bliss," singing: "Baby, in that moment, you'll know this is/Something bigger than us and beyond bliss." In the chorus, she lets her potential mate know that if he is really serious about keeping her, he has to up his game, warning: "'Cause if you want to keep me, you gotta, gotta, gotta, gotta, got to love me harder/And if you really need me, you gotta, gotta, gotta, gotta, got to love me harder." Later, The Weeknd plays a role of a shady love interest with skeletons in his closet, with lines about "how it feels for a woman to have intercourse," followed by carnal promises, singing: "Can you feel the pressure between your hips/ I'll make you feel like the first time." In the bridge, "Grande and Weeknd trade provocative 'oohs'."

== Critical reception ==
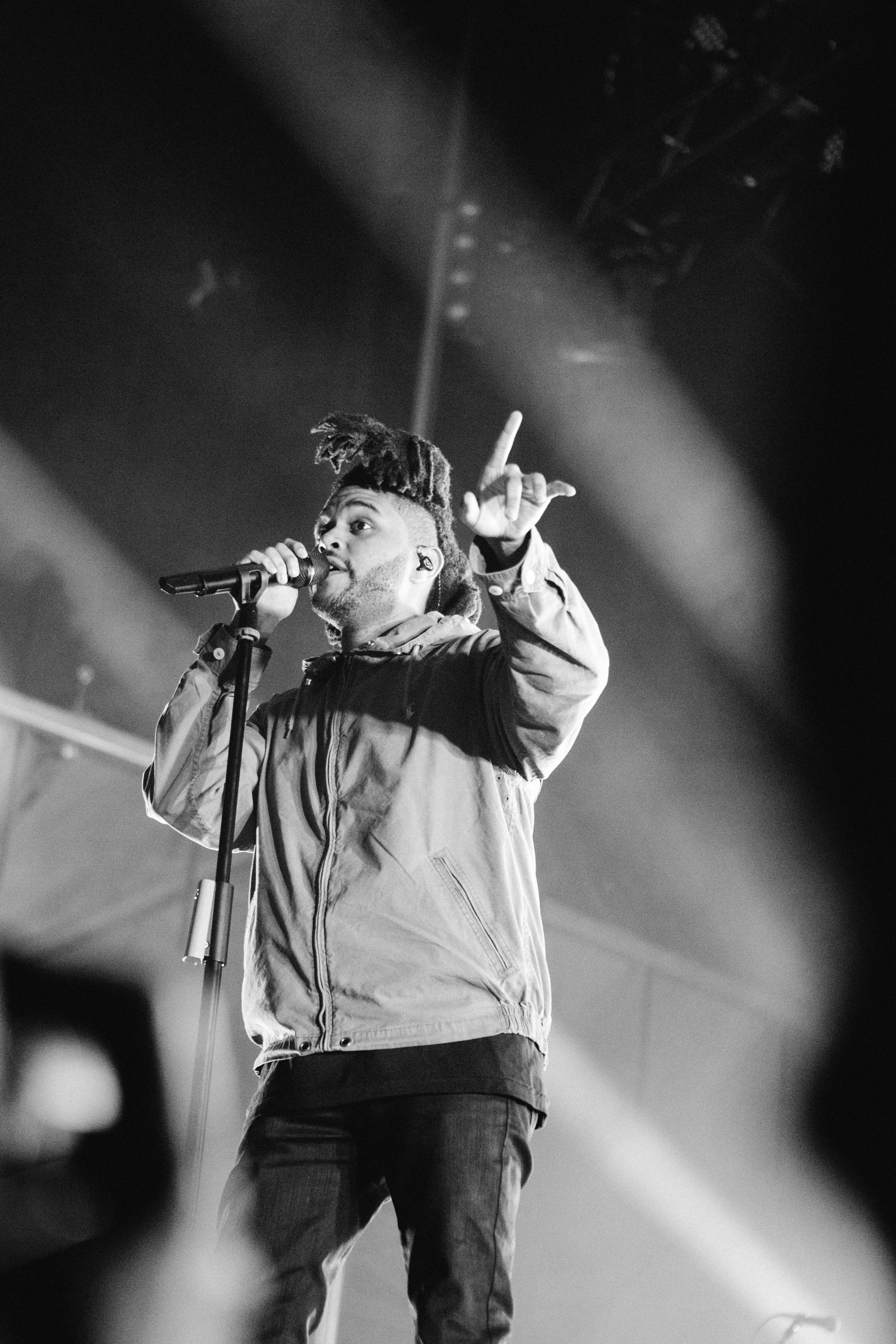
The Weeknd received praise for his vocals on the track.

Stephen Thomas Erlewine of AllMusic noted that Grande allowed the Weeknd to "suck up" the spotlight on the track. Jason Lipshut of Billboard noted that "the pairing somehow makes sense," praising the Weeknd's "ultra-sincere crooning" and the "driving guitar riff" for being "delicious 80's cheese". Mikael Wood of the Los Angeles Times called it a "darker (and more fully realized) R&B jam than anyone probably expected from a 21-year-old singer once known for her endless supply of pastel princess dresses." Kitty Empire of The Guardian wrote that the song's "saturated, mid-tempo atmospherics" stand out, noting that Weeknd's "own sleaze quotient is radically toned down here, but this remains sophisticated stuff, where Grande surprisingly holds her own." Michelle Geslani of Consequence of Sound labelled it "yearning and infectious," calling the pairing "a match made in vocal heaven — Grande's feathery vox and The Weeknd's slick croon complement one another rather perfectly." Carolyn Menyes of Music Times was very receptive with the duo, writing that "they meld really well together."

Writing for The Official Charts Company, Rob Copsey named it the sexiest song on the album, also calling it a "sultry number." Lindsay Zoladz of Vulture claimed the song "is not only one of her strongest tracks to date, but it's also the least bad thing The Weeknd has done in recent memory." Adam Workman of The National wrote Grande is "effective" on the track and that The Weeknd "worryingly hits higher-pitched peaks than Grande." Aimee Cliff of Fact picked it as the album's highlight, saying that the song "is actually improved by The Weeknd's presence, [...] his sleaze is turned down several notches as his clean-cut falsetto battles Ariana's octave-juggling over an irresistible thump." Lewis Corner of Digital Spy praised Grande for "successfully drag[ging] The Weeknd out of his Pitchfork mixtape mindset to sound like an upbeat popstar over subtle grooves and disco claps on [the] captivating serenade [track]." Nick Levine of Time Out called the song "gorgeous", while Rory Cashin of entertainment.ie found that the song has "Grande at her most obviously sexy without being overly explicit, and it works fantastically." Evan Sawdey of PopMatters went out to describe it as "the best song Grande has put out to date," declaring: "The dark, sensual throb of The Weeknd collaboration 'Love Me Harder' actually showcases Grande's voice in its most effective setting, the slow-motion strobelight jam allowing her to come off as teasing, assertive, and knowing all at once." Edwin Ortiz of Complex placed the song at number 8 on "The 50 Best Songs of 2014" list, declaring:

"The unlikely pairing of Ariana Grande and The Weeknd proved to be a stroke of genius on 'Love Me Harder', a seductive synth-pop duet that manages to push both artists out of their comfort zones, while also remaining appealing to each of their core values. [...] "'Love Me Harder' is earmarked as a defining musical moment of 2014. Stroke of genius, indeed."

== Commercial performance ==
In the United States, after spending a couple of weeks on the Bubbling Under Hot 100 Singles chart, "Love Me Harder" made its official debut on the Billboard Hot 100 at number 79. The following week, it jumped to number 57 before ascending to number 37 in its third week, becoming the Weeknd's first top-40 single on the chart. In its fifth week, after the music video's official release, "Love Me Harder" soared to its peak of number seven, becoming Grande's fourth consecutive top-ten single from My Everything, and fifth overall. By becoming her fourth top ten single, Grande became the singer with most top ten entries of 2014, along with her past top ten singles "Problem", "Break Free", and "Bang Bang". In addition, "Love Me Harder" became the Weeknd's first top ten entry on the Billboard Hot 100. As of June 2020, the song had sold 1.3 million copies in the United States and has been certified triple platinum by the Recording Industry Association of America (RIAA).

In Canada, the single reached the top ten, and entered the top twenty in many other countries such as Australia, Finland, Italy and the Netherlands. In many countries, the song became the Weeknd's first chart appearance, including France, where it debuted at number 132, before reaching the top thirty, at number 27, becoming Grande's third top thirty and the Weeknd's first. The song reached top ten in French airplay, becoming Grande's fourth top ten in radio after "Problem", "Break Free" and "Bang Bang" and the Weeknd's first. In Australia, the song debuted at number 46 then jumping at number 19, becoming Grande's fourth top twenty and the Weeknd's first, as well as in Denmark and Italy.

== Music video ==
=== Background and development ===
On October 1, 2014, Grande confirmed she was working on the music video for "Love Me Harder" and Grande's manager Scooter Braun posted a picture on Instagram of the set. In the following days, Grande teased fans by posting photos from the video shoot. The lyric video for "Love Me Harder" was released on October 18, 2014. The music video was directed by Hannah Lux Davis, who also directed the video for Grande's joint single "Bang Bang." A behind-the-scenes video was released on October 28, 2014, where Davis discussed the video's concept, claiming: "Our visuals are really about this tug of war of just loving harder and the compromise of giving in and needing more and wanting more." It premiered on Vevo on November 3, 2014, and surpassed 100 million views on January 11, 2015, making it Grande's fifth Vevo-certified music video, following "The Way", "Problem", "Break Free", as well as her joint single with Jessie J and Nicki Minaj, "Bang Bang". It has received over 860 million views on YouTube, as of February 2026.

=== Synopsis and reception ===
The video opens with "dramatic lightning in a sky boiling over with orange clouds." Throughout the music video, Ariana and the Weeknd "withstand earth, wind and water, symbolizing what one would do for love," as MTV's Emilee Lindner claimed. Lindner continued: "Grande writhes around on a sandy floor, the Weeknd walks nonchalantly through an indoor rain storm, and toward the end, we find Ariana in a pool of water with an air of confidence. At one point, they sing back-to-back, ultimately illustrating what the song is about — being unable to face the wants and needs of a relationship." Lidner called it "her most serious video to date." Gabby Bess of Paper called its visuals "a departure from her previous videos and mark a new, sultry era for the mini diva." Ariana Bacle of Entertainment Weekly agreed, snorting that "The video's vibe, sensual and mysterious, is an obvious departure from Grande's earlier work [...] but fits the song, a stripped-down ballad that's meant to showcase the two singers' voices."

== Live performances ==
Grande and the Weeknd performed the song together live for the first time on the season 40 premiere of Saturday Night Live on September 27, 2014, and for a second time at the American Music Awards on November 23, 2014. Grande also performed part of the song as part of a medley at the 2014 Victoria's Secret Fashion Show, which aired on December 9, 2014, on CBS, and again at the 2015 NBA All-Star Game on February 15, 2015. She also performed the song during The Honeymoon Tour (2015). The performance started with her alone atop a pedestal that rose at the back of the stage. During the shows in Miami, Florida and Inglewood, California, Justin Bieber performed the track with her. "Love Me Harder" was part of Grande's set list at the Dangerous Woman Tour and One Love Manchester, a benefit concert she headlined on June 4, 2017, for the victims of the Manchester Arena bombing. She also performed the song during the Sweetener World Tour on all dates from March 19, 2019, to October 16, 2019, before it got removed. "Love Me Harder" was added to the set list of the Weeknd's After Hours til Dawn Tour, being performed on all dates between October 7, 2023, and October 25, 2023.

== Track listing ==
- Digital download – EP edition
1. "Love Me Harder" (with the Weeknd) – 3:56
2. "Cadillac Song" – 2:52
3. "Too Close" – 3:35

== Credits and personnel ==
Credits adapted from My Everything liner notes.

Recording

- Recorded at Conway Recording Studios (Los Angeles, California), Wolf Cousins Studio (Stockholm, Sweden), P.S. Studio (Stockholm, Sweden)
- The Weeknd's vocals recorded at Studio at the Palms, (Las Vegas, Nevada)
- Mixed at MixStar Studios (Virginia Beach, Virginia)
- Mastered at Sterling Sound (New York City, New York)

Management

- MXM (ASCAP) — administered by Kobalt Songs Music Publishing, Inc. —, Prescription Songs/P.S. Publishing (STIM), Wolf Cousins (STIM), Warner/Chappell Music Scand (STIM), Songs Music Publishing, LLC o/b/o Songs of SMP (ASCAP)/WB Music Corp. (ASCAP) and CP Music Group (SOCAN)
- All rights on behalf of itself and CP Music Group (SOCAN)
- The Weeknd appears courtesy of XO & Co.

Personnel

- Ariana Grande – lead vocals
- The Weeknd – lead vocals, songwriting
- Max Martin – songwriting, background vocals
- Ali Payami – songwriting, production, programming, bass, keyboards, drums, percussion
- Ahmad Balshe – songwriting
- Peter Svensson – songwriting, production
- Peter Carlsson – vocal production
- Sibel – background vocals
- Niklas Ljungfelt – guitar
- Peter Zimney – saxophone
- Sam Holland – engineering
- Eric Weaver – engineering
- Jason "DaHeala" Quenneville – engineering, vocals recording (the Weeknd)
- Cory Bice – engineering assistant
- Serban Ghenea – mixing
- John Hanes – mixing engineering
- Tom Coyne – mastering
- Aya Merrill – mastering

== Charts ==
=== Weekly charts ===
2014–2015 weekly chart performance for "Love Me Harder"
| Chart (2014–2015) | Peak position |
|---|---|
| Australia (ARIA) | 19 |
| Australia Urban (ARIA) | 4 |
| Austria (Ö3 Austria Top 40) | 29 |
| Belgium (Ultratop 50 Flanders) | 45 |
| Belgium Urban (Ultratop Flanders) | 7 |
| Belgium (Ultratop 50 Wallonia) | 43 |
| Canada Hot 100 (Billboard) | 10 |
| Canada CHR/Top 40 (Billboard) | 4 |
| Canada Hot AC (Billboard) | 25 |
| CIS Airplay (TopHit) | 17 |
| Colombia (Los 40 Colombia) | 6 |
| Czech Republic Airplay (ČNS IFPI) | 60 |
| Czech Republic Singles Digital (ČNS IFPI) | 13 |
| Denmark (Tracklisten) | 18 |
| Finland (Suomen virallinen lista) | 13 |
| France (SNEP) | 27 |
| France Airplay (SNEP) | 2 |
| Germany (GfK) | 35 |
| Hungary (Stream Top 40) | 16 |
| Ireland (IRMA) | 33 |
| Italy (FIMI) | 17 |
| Israel International TV Airplay (Media Forest) | 1 |
| Lebanon Airplay (Lebanese Top 20) | 8 |
| Netherlands (Dutch Top 40) | 7 |
| Netherlands (Single Top 100) | 12 |
| New Zealand (Recorded Music NZ) | 28 |
| Norway (VG-lista) | 22 |
| Romania (Airplay 100) | 49 |
| Russia Airplay (TopHit) | 18 |
| Slovakia Airplay (ČNS IFPI) | 41 |
| Slovakia Singles Digital (ČNS IFPI) | 9 |
| Slovenia (SloTop50) | 26 |
| South Africa Airplay (EMA) | 7 |
| South Korea International Chart (GAON) | 15 |
| Sweden (Sverigetopplistan) | 26 |
| Switzerland (Schweizer Hitparade) | 40 |
| Spain (Promusicae) | 54 |
| UK Singles (Official Charts) | 48 |
| Ukraine Airplay (TopHit) | 41 |
| US Billboard Hot 100 | 7 |
| US Adult Pop Airplay (Billboard) | 20 |
| US Dance Airplay (Billboard) | 1 |
| US Dance Club Songs (Billboard) | 20 |
| US Latin Pop Airplay (Billboard) | 20 |
| US Pop Airplay (Billboard) | 3 |
| US Rhythmic Airplay (Billboard) | 1 |
| Venezuela (Top Pop General) | 31 |
| Venezuela English (Top Anglo) | 23 |

2016 weekly chart performance for "Love Me Harder"
| Chart (2016) | Peak position |
|---|---|
| CIS Airplay (TopHit) | 197 |
| Russia Airplay (TopHit) | 174 |

2017 weekly chart performance for "Love Me Harder"
| Chart (2017) | Peak position |
|---|---|
| Ukraine Airplay (TopHit) | 75 |

2023 weekly chart performance for "Love Me Harder"
| Chart (2023) | Peak position |
|---|---|
| Estonia Airplay (TopHit) | 190 |

=== Monthly charts ===
2015 monthly chart performance for "Love Me Harder"
| Chart (2015) | Peak position |
|---|---|
| CIS Airplay (TopHit) | 23 |
| Russia Airplay (TopHit) | 24 |
| Ukraine Airplay (TopHit) | 45 |

=== Year-end charts ===
| Chart (2015) | Position |
|---|---|
| Belgium Urban (Ultratop Flanders) | 35 |
| Canada (Canadian Hot 100) | 61 |
| CIS Airplay (TopHit) | 69 |
| France (SNEP) | 130 |
| Italy (FIMI) | 93 |
| Netherlands (Dutch Top 40) | 63 |
| Netherlands (Single Top 100) | 79 |
| Russia Airplay (TopHit) | 69 |
| Ukraine Airplay (TopHit) | 108 |
| US Billboard Hot 100 | 56 |
| US Dance/Mix Show Airplay (Billboard) | 12 |
| US Mainstream Top 40 (Billboard) | 32 |
| US Rhythmic (Billboard) | 16 |

== Certifications ==
| Region | Certification | Certified units/sales |
|---|---|---|
| Australia (ARIA) | 6× Platinum | 420,000^{‡} |
| Austria (IFPI Austria) | Gold | 15,000^{*} |
| Brazil (Pro-Música Brasil) | Diamond | 250,000^{‡} |
| Canada (Music Canada) | 4× Platinum | 320,000^{‡} |
| Denmark (IFPI Danmark) | Platinum | 60,000^{^} |
| Germany (BVMI) | Gold | 200,000^{‡} |
| Italy (FIMI) | Platinum | 50,000^{‡} |
| New Zealand (RMNZ) | 3× Platinum | 90,000^{‡} |
| Norway (IFPI Norway) | 2× Platinum | 120,000^{‡} |
| Portugal (AFP) | Gold | 5,000^{‡} |
| Spain (Promusicae) | Gold | 20,000^{‡} |
| United Kingdom (BPI) | Platinum | 600,000^{‡} |
| United States (RIAA) | 5× Platinum | 5,000,000^{‡} |
Streaming
| Sweden (GLF) | 2× Platinum | 16,000,000^{†} |
^{*} Sales figures based on certification alone.^{^} Shipments figures based on certification alone.^{‡} Sales+streaming figures based on certification alone.^{†} Streaming-only figures based on certification alone.

== Release history ==
"Love Me Harder" release history
| Region | Date | Format | Label | Ref. |
|---|---|---|---|---|
| United States | September 30, 2014 | Rhythmic contemporary radio | Republic | |
| United States | October 7, 2014 | Contemporary hit radio | Republic | |
| United States | November 10, 2014 | Hot adult contemporary radio | Republic | |
| Australia | November 21, 2014 | Digital download | Republic | |
| New Zealand | November 21, 2014 | Digital download | Republic | |
| Italy | December 5, 2014 | Radio airplay | Universal | |
| Various | December 6, 2024 | 7-inch vinyl | Republic | |
