= Often =

Single by the Weeknd

from the album Beauty Behind the Madness
- Released: July 31, 2014
- Recorded: 2014
- Studio: Bota Studios (Toronto, Ontario)
- Length: 4:10
- Label: XO; Republic
- Songwriters: Ali Kocatepe; Sabahattin Ali; Khaled Khaled; Danny Schofield; Abel Tesfaye; Jason Quenneville; Ahmad Balshe; Osman Ismen
- Producers: Ben Billions; The Weeknd; DaHeala

The Weeknd singles chronology
"Wanderlust" (2014)	"Often" (2014)	"Love Me Harder" (2014)

Music video
- "Often" on YouTube

"Often" is a song by the Canadian singer-songwriter the Weeknd. It was released on July 31, 2014, as the lead single from his second studio album, Beauty Behind the Madness (2015). The song contains a sample from "Ben Sana Vurgunum" by Turkish singer Nükhet Duru.

"Often" peaked within the top 60 on the Billboard Hot 100 and the top 70 of the Canadian Hot 100. The song won two awards at the 2015 Much Music Video Awards, Video of the Year and Best Director.

== Background ==
The Weeknd initially released "Often" exclusively on the streaming service SoundCloud on June 25, 2014. The song was officially released on Apple Music a month later, on July 31.

== Composition & lyrics ==
According to the sheet music published by Songs Music Publishing at Musicnotes.com, "Often" is written in the key of G minor, and follows a tempo of 68 beats per minute. The Weeknd's vocal range spans from F4 to G5.

The lyrics of the song primarily explore the theme of sex, with Stereogum saying that the Weeknd sings about "how good [he] is at fucking," but that he makes it sound like an "absolutely exhausting burden."

== Critical reception ==
Justin Davis of Complex said that the Weeknd was "less dour and a little more excited on this song in comparison with most of the releases from his debut studio album, Kiss Land (2013), and "Often" turns him back to his more lyrical days with a stronger delivery." April Clare Welsh of NME stated the Weeknd "sounds like R Kelly on Viagra, spoiling a track that's seductive enough on its own with lines like 'Baby I can make that pussy rain often.'"

== Commercial performance ==
In the United States, "Often" debuted at number 97 on the US Billboard Hot 100 chart on the week of November 1, 2014. On the week of February 7, 2015, the song peaked at number 59. The song spent a total of 20 weeks on the chart. On December 7, 2016, the single was certified triple platinum by the Recording Industry Association of America (RIAA) for combined sales and streaming equivalent units of over three million units in the United States.

In Canada, the song debuted at number 95 on the Canadian Hot 100 chart on the week of November 1, 2014. On the week of February 28, 2015, it peaked at number 69 on the chart. The song spent a total of 20 weeks on the chart. The single was certified gold by Music Canada for sales of over 40,000 copies in Canada.

== Music video ==
A music video for "Often" was released on August 21, 2014. It depicts the Weeknd in a hotel room, accompanied by several women in various implicit states of undress.

== Remixes ==
The official remix features additional verses from Rick Ross and Schoolboy Q. Another remix, by Norwegian record producer and DJ Kygo was also released.

== Charts ==
=== Weekly charts ===
Chart (2014–2021)	Peak position
Canada Hot 100 (Billboard)	69
Canada CHR/Top 40 (Billboard)	31
Czech Republic Singles Digital (ČNS IFPI)	60
Netherlands (Single Top 100)	65
Ireland (IRMA)	67
Norway (VG-lista)	12
Portugal (AFP)	176
Sweden (Sverigetopplistan)	55
UK Singles (OCC)	65
UK Hip Hop/R&B (OCC)	13
US Billboard Hot 100	59
US Hot R&B/Hip-Hop Songs (Billboard)	15
US R&B/Hip-Hop Airplay (Billboard)	40
US Rhythmic Airplay (Billboard)	22

=== Year-end charts ===
Chart (2014)	Position
US Hot R&B/Hip-Hop Songs (Billboard)	97

Chart (2015)	Position
US Hot R&B Songs (Billboard)	23

== Certifications ==
Region	Certification	Certified units/sales
Australia (ARIA)	4× Platinum	280,000^{‡}
Austria (IFPI Austria)	Platinum	30,000^{*}
Brazil (Pro-Música Brasil)	Diamond	250,000^{‡}
Canada (Music Canada)	3× Platinum	240,000^{‡}
Denmark (IFPI Danmark)	2× Platinum	180,000^{‡}
Germany (BVMI)	Gold	200,000^{‡}
Italy (FIMI)	Gold	50,000^{‡}
Mexico (AMPROFON)	Gold	30,000^{‡}
New Zealand (RMNZ)	3× Platinum	90,000^{‡}
Norway (IFPI Norway)	2× Platinum	20,000^{‡}
Portugal (AFP)	Gold	10,000^{‡}
Spain (Promusicae)	Gold	30,000^{‡}
Sweden (GLF)	Platinum	40,000^{‡}
United Kingdom (BPI)	2× Platinum	1,200,000^{‡}
United States (RIAA)	4× Platinum	4,000,000^{‡}
^{*} Sales figures based on certification alone.^{‡} Sales+streaming figures based on certification alone.

== Release history ==
Region	Date	Format	Label
United States	July 31, 2014	Digital download	XO; Republic
