= Prisoner (The Weeknd song) =

Song by the Weeknd featuring Lana Del Rey

from the album Beauty Behind the Madness
- Released: August 28, 2015
- Studio: Conway (Hollywood)
- Genre: Pop; R&B
- Length: 4:34
- Label: XO; Republic
- Songwriters: Abel Tesfaye; Elizabeth Grant; Carlo Montagnese
- Producers: Illangelo; The Weeknd

Audio
- "Prisoner" on YouTube

"Prisoner" is a song by Canadian singer-songwriter the Weeknd, featuring American singer-songwriter Lana Del Rey, from the former's second studio album Beauty Behind the Madness (2015). They co-wrote the song with Illangelo, who co-produced it with the Weeknd. It is the first of the four collaborations between the two artists, being followed by "Party Monster", from the Weeknd's third studio album Starboy (2016).

== Commercial performance ==
"Prisoner" debuted at number 16 on the Hot R&B/Hip-Hop Songs chart, with 51,291 copies sold in its first week. The song also accrued 3.7 million US streams.

== Live performances ==
Del Rey and the Weeknd performed the song live together for the first time on December 9, 2015, at the Forum in Inglewood, California.

== Critical reception ==
Alex Kritselis of Bustle wrote, "The mid-tempo duet sounds exactly how you'd expect it to sound: dark, tortured, and a little bit over-the-top. Depending on how you feel about The Weeknd and Del Rey — two artists who share a flair for the dramatic — this either makes the track absolutely perfect or absolutely unlistenable. Personally, I'm digging it." In his review of the album, Rolling Stone's Jon Dolan described the song as "a summit of luxuriant sadness" and "quite the slow-burning pity party". Chris DeVille of Stereogum called "Prisoner" "the most intriguing part" of Beauty Behind the Madness, and said the song "feels like an old Weeknd mixtape track, but with touches of Del Rey's doomed noir glamor". Vulture's Dee Lockett wrote, "Lana, the tortured lover, and the Weeknd, the addict, sound exactly as you'd expect on this bombastic morbid-pop-meets-lusty-R&B ballad. They croon about their respective sorrows: Lana wonders if Hollywood has poisoned her, while the Weeknd comes to grips with falling in love. For most people, that last one would be a relief, but for someone who previously bragged, "I just fucked two bitches before I saw you," it's like living out a horror film. But they each agree that whatever pain they're in, they brought it on themselves: "I'm addicted to a life that's so empty and so cold / I'm a prisoner to my decisions," they whine in tandem. Of course, it ends with a Lana soliloquy."

In 2019, Billboard's Kirsten Spruch included "Prisoner" in her list of Del Rey's best collaborations. In his 2019 list of "Every Lana Del Rey Song, Ranked", Richard S. He of Billboard ranked the song number 75.

== Charts ==
=== Weekly charts ===
Chart (2015)	Peak position
Canada Hot 100 (Billboard)	51
France (SNEP)	113
Sweden (Sverigetopplistan)	95
UK Singles (OCC)	78
UK Hip Hop/R&B (OCC)	19
US Billboard Hot 100	47
US Hot R&B/Hip-Hop Songs (Billboard)	13

=== Year-end charts ===
Chart (2015)	Position
US Hot R&B Songs (Billboard)	46

== Certifications ==
Region	Certification	Certified units/sales
Australia (ARIA)	Gold	35,000^{‡}
Canada (Music Canada)	Gold	40,000^{‡}
United States (RIAA)	Platinum	1,000,000^{‡}
^{‡} Sales+streaming figures based on certification alone.
