= Ali Payami =

Swedish DJ

- Born: August 30, 1983 (age 43); Tehran, Iran
- Origin: Sweden
- Occupations: Record producer; songwriter; DJ
- Years active: 2001–present

Ali Payami is a Swedish record producer, songwriter, and DJ.

Payami's first number one hit on the Billboard Hot 100 was The Weeknd's single "Can't Feel My Face". In 2016, he won a Grammy for Album of the Year for his contributions on Taylor Swift's album 1989. He has also worked with other musicians such as Demi Lovato, Ariana Grande, Ellie Goulding and Katy Perry.

== Early life ==
Ali was born in the Iranian capital, Tehran. Then, once his family moved to Sweden during his early childhood. he was first exposed to music in Malmö. At a young age he listened to many genres of music, ranging from Dr. Dre's The Chronic to Nirvana. He watched people in bands rehearse and make music, which prompted him to develop interest in the same. This interest was reflected by his statement "When you play something and see people's reactions when they hear it... It really affected me."

Growing up, however, he became more interested in house music, siding away from the pop genre he was exposed to. This was evident from his words "...these guys were more into pop and mainstream, and I chose more house music..." in an interview. Payami didn't understand how to make music when he was younger. However, as years passed and new, better software became available for music production, he learnt the basics by watching others do so. Later, he bought the programs and started creating music himself.

Ali Payami then started DJing at school parties and in local clubs. He said “DJing played a big part in what I do now; the mentality of it and the love of both new and old music. When you play something and see people's reactions when they hear it... It really affected me.” in an interview with Billboard. While working in clubs, Payami had to get other jobs to support himself, including a short lived job as a telemarketer. He described this experience as "weird", stating “I loved DJing, but what I didn't like was being the center of attention.”

== Career ==
=== Beginnings ===
Ali Payami met Julius Petersson, then an A&R for Warner/Chappel, during the time he was DJing in clubs. This provided him a major opportunity at the time, as the public house gave him a cash advance. In Payami's words, "It allowed me to not have to work on anything else but music, so you can eat but also concentrate on what you want to do". Payami was also grateful to Julius and considered him a visionary, stating "Julius was such a visionary. He believed in not just me, but a lot of people who are very successful now."

Through Petersson, Max Martin's brother-in-law, Payami was introduced to Shellback, a highly successful Swedish music producer. This eventually enabled Payami to collaborate with Max Martin. Payami commented on Martin, saying "He's not only amazing and talented the way everyone knows him, but he's also a great guy. It's not just music; you learn so much about life, how to collaborate with people, and how to be open and not let egos take over the room.”

=== Rise to fame ===
Ali Payami's collaborations with Max Martin since 2014 have been an "ubiquitous part of the pop radio landscape", as described by Billboard. His work on Ariana Grande's song "Love Me Harder" was one of the first of such collaborations, on which Payami commented, "I remember sitting in a studio in L.A. and me and [Peter Svensson] were just playing around. A few days later, he showed me this voice note with a part of a melody that we had played, and we tried to recreate it. From there, the whole thing came together. Savan came in with more melodies and lyrics, and then after that The Weeknd did his thing."

Ali Payami worked on The Weeknd's song "Can't Feel My Face", which helped him settle himself as a popular pop artist. The song hit No.1 on the Billboard Hot 100 and obtained two Grammy nominations, for "Record of the Year" and "Best Pop Solo Performance". Payami said that it was a very simple song, and not "super advanced". Max Martin, on Payami, jokingly commented that he was envious of him, who "listened to new music all the time"

Payami has worked with Taylor Swift, co-writing and co-producing "Style" from her album 1989 (2014), and "...Ready for It?" from Reputation (2017).

Payami co-wrote and co-produced Katy Perry's single "Chained to the Rhythm" from her album Witness (2017).

Payami worked with Poppy on her fifth studio album Zig (2023).

Payami resides in Stockholm and works in Wolf Cousins Studio.

== Discography ==
=== Albums ===
Year	Artist	Album	Role
2024	Jason Derulo	Nu King	Producer, Co-writer
2023	Taylor Swift	1989 (Taylor's Version)	Co-writer
2023	Poppy	Zig	Producer, Co-writer
2022	Fletcher	Girl of My Dreams	Co-producer, Co-writer
2021	L Devine	Near Life Experience Part Two	Producer, Writer
2020	Astrid S	Leave It Beautiful	Producer, Co-writer
2017	Taylor Swift	Reputation	Producer, Co-writer, keyboards, programming
2017	Katy Perry	Witness	Guitar, Drums, Bass, Synths, Piano, Background Vocals, Producer, Programming
2017	Tove Lo	Blue Lips	Producer, Co-Writer
2016	Various Artists	2016 Grammy Nominees	Composer, Producer
2016	The Pigs	The Great Bluegrass Swindle	Composer, Producer, Programmer Covers of Just Can't Get Enough, Total Eclipse of The Heart, Party Rock Anthem, Adele's Rolling in the Deep, Kanye West's Gold Digger and Milkshake
2016	Ariana Grande	Dangerous Woman	Bass, Composer, Guitar, Keyboards, Percussion, Producer, Programming
2016	Various Artists	Fitness Beats 2016	Composer, Musical Instrument, Producer, Programmer
2016	Ron Jeremiah	Ghost Town 2016	Composer
2016	Various	Ghostbusters (Original Motion Picture Soundtrack)	Bass, Composer, Drums, Guitar, Keyboards, Percussion, Piano, Producer, Programming
2016	Sabina Ddumba	Homeward Bound	Bass, Composer, Drums, Guitar, Keyboards, Percussion, Producer, Programmer
2016	Chlara	In a Different Light	Composer
2016	Kidz Bop	Kidz Bop 33	Composer
2016	Laleh	Kristaller	Composer
2016	Tove Lo	Lady Wood	Bass, Co-composer Co-composer, Drums, Guitar, Instrumentation, Keyboards, Producer, Programming
2016	Nick Jonas	Last Year Was Complicated	Bass, Composer, Drums, Keyboards, Producer, Programming, Synthesizer
2016	Various Artists	Lazy Afternoon [UMTV]	Composer
2016	Beth	Love Songs	Composer
2016	Baby Rockstar	Lullaby Renditions of Taylor Swift: 1989	Composer
2016	Various Artists	Now That's What I Call Music! 58	Composer
2016	Various Artists	Now That's What I Call Music! 60	Composer
2016	Various Artists	Now That's What I Call a Workout 2017	Composer
2016	Various Artists	Now That's What I Call Music! 57	Composer
2016	Various Artists	Party Tyme Karaoke: Super Hits, Vol. 26	Composer
2016	Jim Brickman	Pure Cinema	Composer
2016	Alessandro Danello	Shine - EP	Composer
2016	The Weeknd	Starboy	Composer
2016	David Nail	Uncovered - EP	Composer
2015	Ryan Adams	1989	Composer
2015	The Weeknd	Beauty Behind the Madness	Bass, Composer, Drums, Keyboards, Producer, Programming, Synthesizer
2015	Demi Lovato	Confident	Composer, Drums, Guitar, Percussion, Producer, Programming
2015	Ellie Goulding	Delirium	Bass, Composer, Drums, Guitar, Keyboards, Percussion, Producer, Programming, Synthesizer, Vocals (Background)
2015	Various Artists	Fifty Shades of Grey: Original Motion Picture Soundtrack	Bass, Composer, Drums, Keyboards, Percussion, Producer, Programming, Vocals (Background)
2015		Fifty Shades of Grey Remixed	Composer
2015	Sabrina	I Love Acoustic 8	Composer
2015	Kidz Bop	Kidz Bop 28	Composer
2015	Kidz Bop	Kidz Bop 29	Composer
2015	Various Artists	Now That's What I Call Music! 53	Composer
2015	Various Artists	Now That's What I Call Music! 55	Composer
2015	Various Artists	Now That's What I Call Music! 56	Composer
2015	Various Artists	Now That's What I Call Music! 54	Composer
2015	Various Artists	Party Tyme Karaoke: Girl Pop Mega Pack, Vol. 3	Composer
2015	Various Artists	Party Tyme Karaoke: Girl Pop Party Pack, Vol. 6	Composer
2015	Various Artists	Party Tyme Karaoke: Girl Pop, Vol. 24	Composer
2015	Various Artists	Party Tyme Karaoke: Pop Mega Pack, Vol. 3	Composer
2015	Piano Rockstar	Piano Renditions of Taylor Swift: 1989	Composer
2015	Nessi	Rolling With the Punches	Composer
2015	Ariana Azalea	Style: New Romantics 2015 Gangnam EP	Composer
2015	Koryn Hawthorne	The Voice: The Complete Season 8 Collection	Composer
2015	Straight No Chaser	The New Old Fashioned	Composer
2015	Adam Lambert	The Original High	Bass, Composer, Drums, Instrumentation, Keyboards, Musician, Percussion, Producer, Programmer, Programming, Unknown Instrument, Various Instruments
2015	Patrick Rouiller	Tous Les Titres Du Gagnant Nouvelle Star 2016	Composer
2015	Tori Kelly	Unbreakable Smile	Composer, Instrumentation, Percussion, Producer, Programming
2014	Taylor Swift	1989	Co-writer, Keyboards, Co-producer, Programming
2014	Lea Michele	Louder	Composer, Engineer, Keyboards, Producer, Programming, Strings
2014	Ariana Grande	My Everything	Bass, Composer, Drums, Keyboards, Percussion, Producer, Programming
2014	Various Artists	NRG Workout	Primary Artist
2014	Tove Lo	Queen of the Clouds	Co-composer, Instrumentation, Producer, Programming, Remixing
2014	Taylor Swift	Taylor Swift Karaoke: 1989	Composer, Keyboards, Producer, Programming
2012	Loreen	Heal	Composer
2011	Various Artists	Most Wanted!, Vol. 1: The Ultimate Clubhouse	Primary Artist
2010	Various Artists	101 Ibiza Anthems	Producer
2010	Various Artists	Big Tunes: Destination Dance	Producer
2010	Various Artists	Club Anthems 2010	Producer
2010	Various Artists	Clubland Smashed	Primary Artist
2010	Various Artists	Kanikuly 2010	Primary Artist
2010	Various Artists	Ministry of Sound: Running Trax, Vol. 2	Producer
2010	Ali Payami	Roots	Primary Artist
2010	Various Artists	The Mash Up Mix 2010	Producer
2009	Various Artists	Absolute Dance: Winter 2009	Primary Artist
2009	Various Artists	Chilled Euphoria [Ministry of Sound]	Additional Production, Remixing
2009	Various Artists	Clubbers Guide 2009	Producer, Composer, Primary Artist
2009	Various Artists	Clubland Classix, Vol. 2	Primary Artist
2009	Various Artists	Clubland Classix 2 [Digital Bundle Package]	Primary Artist
2009	Various Artists	Dance Chart, Winter/Spring 2009	Primary Artist
2009	Various Artists	Euro Hits 2008	Primary Artist
2009	Various Artists	From House to Electro 2009: In the Mix	Primary Artist
2009	Various Artists	Hardcore Til I Die, Vol. 2 [2009]	Primary Artist
2009	Various Artists	Hed Kandi: Beach House 2009	Producer
2009	Various Artists	Hed Kandi: Summer Sampler 2009	Producer, Engineer, Mixing, Primary Artist
2009	Various Artists	Hed Kandi: The Mix Spring 2009	Composer, Primary Artist
2009	Various Artists	House 2009	Primary Artist
2009	Various Artists	Ministry of Sound: Annual 2010	Additional Production, Remixing
2009	Amy Diamond	Swings and Roundabouts	Composer
2009	Various Artists	The Annual Compilation 2010	Primary Artist
2009	Various Artists	Ultimate NRG 4	Primary Artist
2008	Various Artists	Club Sensation 2008	Primary Artist
2008	Various Artists	Club House Sensation 2008	Producer, Primary Artist
2008	Various Artists	Club Sounds, Vol. 46	Primary Artist
2008	Various Artists	Club Trance, Vol. 2	Composer, Primary Artist
2008	Various Artists	Clubbers Best Choice	Primary Artist
2008	Various Artists	Clublife: The Weekend Has Landed	Primary Artist
2008	Various Artists	Dream Dance, Vol. 49	Primary Artist
2008	Various Artists	Electro House Alarm, Vol. 3	Primary Artist
2008	Various Artists	Future Trance, Vol. 45	Primary Artist
2008	Various Artists	Hed Kandi: The Mix - Summer 2008	Producer, Remixing
2008	Frida	Hoppa Upp!	Producer, Composer
2008	Various Artists	Housexy 2008	Producer, Remixing
2008	Various Artists	Ibiza Residence '08	Primary Artist
2008	Daniel Desnoyers	In Da House, Vol. 3	Composer, Primary Artist
2008	Various Artists	Kontor House of House, Vol. 6	Primary Artist
2008	Various Artists	Kontor Top of the Clubs, Vol. 40	Primary Artist
2008	Various Artists	Ministry of Sound: Annual 2009 [Germany]	Primary Artist
2008	Various Artists	Ministry of Sound: The Annual, Winter 2009	Primary Artist
2008	Various Artists	Progressive Attack	Primary Artist
2008	Various Artists	Tanecní Liga Best Dance Hits 2008	Primary Artist
2008	Various Artists	Tanecní Liga, Vol. 105	Primary Artist
2008	Various Artists	Tekno! 47	Primary Artist
2008	Various Artists	Tunnel Trance Force, Vol. 46	Primary Artist
2008	Various Artists	Viva Club Rotation, Vol. 39	Primary Artist
2008	Various Artists	Welcome to the Club, Vol. 14	Primary Artist
2008	Various Artists	Work It out...Pump It Up!!!	Primary Artist
2007	Various Artists	Club Miami, Vol. 1	Composer, Primary Artist
2007	DJ Jondal	La Nuit, Vol. 2: Rare Lounge	Producer, Composer
2007	Måns Zelmerlöw	Stand by For...	Producer
2007	Various Artists	Sunshine House	Composer, Primary Artist
2005	Arash	Arash	Remixing
2001	Various Artists	Disco Kandi	Producer, Engineer, Mixing, Composer, Primary Artist

=== Produced songs ===
Year	Artist	Title	Role
2024	Jason Derulo	"Lie to Me"	Producer, Writer
2024	Jason Derulo	"Save the Last Dance"	Producer, Writer
2023	Poppy	Church Outfit	Producer, Writer
2022	Tove Lo	I‘m to Blame	Producer, Writer
2018	Liam Payne	"For You (with Rita Ora)"	Producer, Writer
2017	Taylor Swift	"...Ready For It?"	Producer, Writer
2017	Tove Lo	Don‘t Ask Don‘t Tell	Producer, Writer
2017	Tove Lo	Bitches	Producer, Writer
2017	Tove Lo	Stranger	Producer, Writer
2017	Lana Del Rey	'"Lust for Life"	Drums
2017	Katy Perry	Chained to the Rhythm	Producer, Writer
2017	Katy Perry	Witness	Producer, Writer
2017	Katy Perry	Roulette	Producer, Writer
2017	Katy Perry	Hey Hey Hey	Producer, Writer
2016	Ariana Grande	Touch it	Producer, Writer
2016	The Weeknd	Rockin‘	Producer, Writer
2016	The Weeknd	A Lonely Night	Producer, Writer
2016	The Weeknd	Love to Lay	Producer, Writer
2016	Nick Jonas	Under You	Producer, Writer
2016	Tove Lo	Keep it Simple	Producer, Writer
2016	Katy Perry	"Rise"	Producer, Writer
2016	Adam Lambert	"Welcome to the Show"	Producer, Writer
2015	Ellie Goulding	Love Me Like You Do	Producer, Writer
2015	Ellie Goulding	Army	Producer, Writer
2015	Ellie Goulding	Devotion	Producer, Writer
2015	Taylor Swift	"Style"	Producer, Writer
2015	Tori Kelly	California Lover	Producer, Writer
2015	Adam Lambert	Ghost Town	Producer
2015	Adam Lambert	Lucy	Producer, Writer
2015	Adam Lambert	Underground	Producer, Writer
2015	Adam Lambert	There i Said it	Producer, Writer
2015	Adam Lambert	Evil in the Night	Producer, Writer
2015	Adam Lambert	Another Lonely Night	Producer, Writer
2015	The Weeknd	Shameless	Producer, Writer
2015	The Weeknd	Can‘t Feel My Face	Producer, Writer
2015	The Weeknd	In the Night	Producer, Writer
2015	Robin Thicke	"Back Together"	Producer, Writer
2015	Demi Lovato	Cool for the Summer	Producer, Writer
2014	Vybe	Warm Summer Daze	Producer, Writer
2014	Ariana Grande	Love Me Harder	Producer, Writer
2014	Bishanyia Vincent	Thousand Needels	Producer, Writer
2011	Loreen	Sober	Producer, Writer
