= Earned It =

Single by the Weeknd

from the album Fifty Shades of Grey: Original Motion Picture Soundtrack
- B-side: "Where You Belong"
- Released: December 23, 2014
- Recorded: 2014
- Studio: Maison de Musique (Santa Monica, California)
- Genre: Chamber pop; R&B
- Length: 4:10 (single / soundtrack version); 4:37 (album version)
- Label: Republic
- Songwriters: Abel Tesfaye; Stephan Moccio; Jason Quenneville; Ahmad Balshe
- Producers: Stephan Moccio; Jason Quenneville

The Weeknd singles chronology
"Love Me Harder" (2014)	"Earned It" (2014)	"Drinks On Us" (2015)

Music video
- "Earned It" on YouTube

"Earned It", alternatively titled "Earned It (Fifty Shades of Grey)", is a song by the Canadian singer-songwriter the Weeknd. The song was released as the lead single from the soundtrack to the 2015 film Fifty Shades of Grey and was included on the Weeknd's second studio album Beauty Behind the Madness (2015).

Unlike the film, which was critically panned, "Earned It" was lauded by critics upon release, and peaked at number three on the Billboard Hot 100, becoming the Weeknd's first top five single. The song's popularity earned the soundtrack to Fifty Shades of Grey two concurrent top-ten singles, with Ellie Goulding's "Love Me like You Do" also peaking at number three. Its music video was directed by the film's director, Sam Taylor-Johnson, features the film's lead actress, Dakota Johnson, and has the same BDSM theme. The song was nominated for Best Original Song at the 88th Academy Awards and won the Grammy Award for Best R&B Performance at the 58th Annual Grammy Awards. On February 16, 2023, it was certified diamond by the Recording Industry Association of America (RIAA) for selling more than ten million copies in the United States.

== Background ==
The Weeknd was involved in the project very early on. Tom Mackay, a manager at Republic Records, explained: "He worked on a number of songs for a number of scenes. Some were working and some weren't, but he just kept at it, and kept at it, and kept at it. In the end, he wrote 'Earned It' and it's the biggest song of his career to date. It's the only song that's in the movie twice". Director Sam Taylor-Johnson said the Weeknd's voice is instantly seductive, which fit the film perfectly. The singer agreed saying the film and his music is like "a match made in heaven". An alternative version of the single, with a new slightly long intro, was later included in the Weeknd's album Beauty Behind the Madness (2015).

== Composition ==
"Earned It" is a chamber pop and R&B song. It is written in the key of D minor with a slow tempo of 60 beats per minute (Largo) in 6/8 time. There is an alternation between the chords Gm7 and Dm7, and Tesfaye's vocals span two octaves from D_{3} to D_{5}.

== Critical reception ==
Critics praised "Earned It" upon release, with Mitchell Bozzetto of Renowned for Sound writing, "Tesfaye definitely has one of the best modern day R&B voices and it certainly shows in this track, his pitch and tone are spot on which makes this a soothing listen." Tom Breihan of Stereogum wrote, "With its streaking, soundtracky strings, "Earned It" almost sounds like it could come from one of the '80s erotic thrillers that clearly inspired Fifty Shades. It's not a great Weeknd song, but it's a pretty interesting career move.

Andrew Ryce of Pitchfork praised the Weeknd's vocals but said that the song is "kind of icky". Kitty Empire of The Guardian called the song "a genre curveball that nevertheless sat comfortably with the Weeknd's depraved brand identity, cultivated over three mixtapes."

Rolling Stone ranked the song at number 39 on its "50 best songs of 2015" list: "The 50 Shades of Grey soundtrack proved Abel Tesfaye's ideal entree into the pop mainstream, though here he eschewed S&M to instead focus on the bottom line, lending his liquid falsetto to the role of affectionate sugar daddy."

== Accolades ==
The song won the Grammy Award for Best R&B Performance at the 58th Annual Grammy Awards, while also being nominated for Best R&B Song, and Best Song Written for Visual Media. The song also received a nomination for Best Original Song at the 88th Academy Awards.

== Chart performance ==
In the Weeknd's native Canada, "Earned It" peaked at number eight on the Canadian Hot 100. "Earned It" peaked at number three on the Billboard Hot 100, the second single from the Fifty Shades of Grey soundtrack to enter the top 10, after Ellie Goulding's "Love Me like You Do", which also peaked at number three. It became the Weeknd's second top-ten hit, after his collaboration with Ariana Grande on the number seven peaking hit, "Love Me Harder" and his highest-selling song on the chart at the time. The song has also been a commercial success overseas, reaching the top ten in 10 other countries, including the United Kingdom, Sweden, Denmark, Switzerland, Spain, Norway and New Zealand, while attaining a top twenty position in countries that include Australia, Germany, and Ireland. In France, the song debuted at number 162 by the end of January 2015, becoming the Weeknd's second entry in the country after "Love Me Harder" with Ariana Grande. The following week, the song jumped at number 38, becoming his second top forty. Three weeks later, it reached the top five, peaking at number 2, blocked by "Uptown Funk" by Bruno Mars and Mark Ranson, and becoming the Weeknd's highest-charting song at the time, before being surpassed by "Starboy" (2016) with Daft Punk next year, which topped the French Singles Chart. The song was later certified gold by the SNEP for over 75,000 units sold.

== Music video ==
The music video, directed by the film's director Sam Taylor-Johnson, was shot at the Palace Theater in Los Angeles. It was released on Vevo and YouTube on January 21, 2015. It includes the BDSM theme as seen in the film. The video shows The Weeknd performing on stage as a group of topless women with black tape over their breasts perform a BDSM-themed burlesque routine behind him. Dakota Johnson makes a cameo appearance in the video.

== Track listing ==
- Republic – 06025 4730000 3

European CD single
No.	Title	Length
1.	"Earned It (Fifty Shades of Grey)"	4:11
2.	"Where You Belong"	4:56

== Charts ==
=== Weekly charts ===
Chart (2015–2021)	Peak position
Australia (ARIA)	13
Austria (Ö3 Austria Top 40)	21
Belgium (Ultratop 50 Flanders)	14
Belgium Urban (Ultratop Flanders)	5
Belgium (Ultratop 50 Wallonia)	14
Canada Hot 100 (Billboard)	8
Canada AC (Billboard)	13
Canada CHR/Top 40 (Billboard)	3
Canada Hot AC (Billboard)	4
Czech Republic Airplay (ČNS IFPI)	35
Czech Republic Singles Digital (ČNS IFPI)	7
Denmark (Tracklisten)	2
Euro Digital Song Sales (Billboard)	5
Finland (Suomen virallinen lista)	13
France (SNEP)	2
Germany (GfK)	17
Global 200 (Billboard)	113
Hungary (Single Top 40)	19
Hungary (Stream Top 40)	9
Iceland (RÚV)	2
Ireland (IRMA)	15
Italy (FIMI)	25
Lebanon (Lebanese Top 20)	13
Netherlands (Dutch Top 40)	15
Netherlands (Single Top 100)	8
New Zealand (Recorded Music NZ)	7
Norway (VG-lista)	6
Poland (Polish Airplay New)	3
Portugal (AFP)	74
Romania Airplay (Media Forest)	3
Romania TV Airplay (Media Forest)	2
Scottish Singles Sales (Official Charts)	9
South Korea International (Gaon)	55
Spain (Promusicae)	7
Sweden (Sverigetopplistan)	7
Switzerland (Schweizer Hitparade)	7
UK Singles (Official Charts)	4
UK Hip Hop/R&B (Official Charts)	1
US Billboard Hot 100	3
US Adult Contemporary (Billboard)	13
US Adult Pop Airplay (Billboard)	9
US Adult R&B Songs (Billboard)	1
US Dance Airplay (Billboard)	6
US Hot R&B/Hip-Hop Songs (Billboard)	1
US Pop Airplay (Billboard)	1
US R&B/Hip-Hop Airplay (Billboard)	1
US Rhythmic Airplay (Billboard)	1

=== Year-end charts ===
Chart (2015)	Position
Australia (ARIA)	80
Belgium (Ultratop 50 Flanders)	66
Belgium (Ultratop 50 Wallonia)	49
Canada (Canadian Hot 100)	29
Denmark (Tracklisten)	14
France (SNEP)	19
Germany (Official German Charts)	89
Hungary (Stream Top 40)	48
Italy (FIMI)	85
Netherlands (Dutch Top 40)	73
Netherlands (Single Top 100)	41
New Zealand (Recorded Music NZ)	23
Spain (PROMUSICAE)	38
Sweden (Sverigetopplistan)	41
Switzerland (Schweizer Hitparade)	28
UK Singles (OCC)	26
US Billboard Hot 100	9
US Adult Contemporary (Billboard)	31
US Adult Top 40 (Billboard)	38
US Hot R&B/Hip-Hop Songs (Billboard)	6
US Mainstream Top 40 (Billboard)	20
US R&B/Hip-Hop Airplay (Billboard)	1
US Rhythmic (Billboard)	6

=== Decade-end charts ===
Chart (2010–2019)	Position
US Hot R&B/Hip-Hop Songs (Billboard)	45

== Certifications ==
Region	Certification	Certified units/sales
Australia (ARIA)	6× Platinum	420,000^{‡}
Austria (IFPI Austria)	Platinum	30,000^{*}
Belgium (BRMA)	Gold	10,000^{‡}
Brazil (Pro-Música Brasil)	2× Diamond	500,000^{‡}
Canada (Music Canada)	6× Platinum	480,000^{‡}
Denmark (IFPI Danmark)	3× Platinum	270,000^{‡}
France (SNEP)	Gold	75,000^{*}
Germany (BVMI)	Platinum	400,000^{‡}
Italy (FIMI)	Platinum	50,000^{‡}
New Zealand (RMNZ)	5× Platinum	150,000^{‡}
Norway (IFPI Norway)	2× Platinum	20,000^{‡}
Poland (ZPAV)	2× Platinum	40,000^{‡}
Portugal (AFP)	2× Platinum	40,000^{‡}
Spain (Promusicae)	2× Platinum	120,000^{‡}
Sweden (GLF)	3× Platinum	120,000^{‡}
United Kingdom (BPI)	3× Platinum	1,800,000
United States (RIAA)	Diamond	10,000,000^{‡}
^{*} Sales figures based on certification alone.^{‡} Sales+streaming figures based on certification alone.

== Release history ==
Region	Date	Format	Label	Ref.
United States	December 23, 2014	Digital download	Republic	
United States	January 13, 2015	Rhythmic contemporary radio	Republic	
United States	February 24, 2015	Contemporary hit radio	Republic	
United Kingdom	April 6, 2015	Mainstream radio	Republic	
Austria, Germany, Switzerland	April 10, 2015	CD	Republic	
