= DaHeala =

Canadian record producer and songwriter

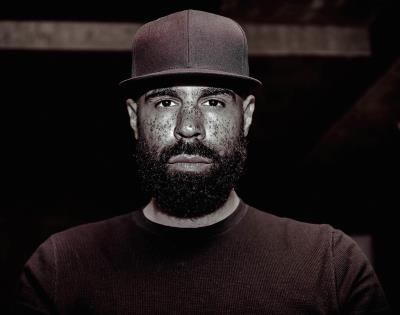

Background information
- Born: Jason Matthew Quenneville; February 23, 1982 (age 44); Gatineau, Quebec, Canada
- Occupations: Record producer; songwriter; engineer
- Years active: 2003–present
- Labels: Universal Publishing/SAL&CO; XO

Jason Matthew Quenneville (born February 23, 1982), professionally known as DaHeala (/dəˈhiːlə/ də-HEE-lə), is a Canadian record producer and songwriter managed by SAL&CO. He has produced for artists such as the Weeknd, Halsey, Lil Uzi Vert, and Belly, among others. He has earned three Grammy Award nominations for his production work on the Weeknd's 2015 album, Beauty Behind the Madness. Over the course of his career, he has collaborated with producers Max Martin, Daft Punk, Rick Rubin, and Metro Boomin.

== Early life and career ==
Quenneville grew up in Gatineau, Quebec in a household that spoke both French and English. At the age of 13, he learned how to DJ at a youth center which led to him learning how to use FL Studio 3 (formerly FruityLoops). His first production work was at the age of 23, when he worked on a mixtape (Death Before Dishonor) for Belly. He continued working with Belly on later projects including the 2007 album, The Revolution. He also produced all the tracks on Massari's 2005 self-titled debut album.

Quenneville began working with the Weeknd on the singer's 2013 album, Kiss Land. He produced every song on the album in collaboration with DannyBoyStyles and the Weeknd himself. In 2014, he earned a production placement on Rick Ross' album, Mastermind, for the track "In Vein" featuring the Weeknd. He collaborated with fellow producers, Metro Boomin and Rick Rubin, on the song.

In 2015, Quenneville was the executive producer on the Weeknd's album, Beauty Behind the Madness. He also produced and wrote several tracks on the album including "Often", "Acquainted", "Dark Times" (featuring Ed Sheeran), and "Earned It". The last song, alternatively titled "Earned It (Fifty Shades of Grey)", appeared on the soundtrack to the 2015 film, Fifty Shades of Grey. It was nominated for the Academy Award for Best Original Song and two Grammy Awards for Best R&B Song and Best Song Written for Visual Media. The nominations were shared among Quenneville, the Weeknd, Belly, and Stephan Moccio. The album itself was nominated for the Grammy Award for Album of the Year and won the award for Best Urban Contemporary Album.

In 2016, Quenneville co-wrote five tracks on the Weeknd's third studio album, Starboy, including the title track which featured Daft Punk. For co-writing the song, Quenneville earned a SOCAN No. 1 Song Award. Also in 2016, he co-wrote the Halsey track, "Not Afraid Anymore", which appeared on the soundtrack to the sequel film, Fifty Shades Darker. Over the course of the next two years, Quenneville produced and wrote tracks for several other artists including Lil Uzi Vert ("UnFazed" featuring the Weeknd), French Montana ("A Lie" featuring the Weeknd), and Nav ("What I Need").

In 2020, Quenneville co-wrote and produced tracks on the Weeknd's fourth studio album, After Hours, including the 2019 single, "Blinding Lights", which eventually became the Billboard #1 Greatest Hot 100 Hit of All Time in 2021. In late March 2020, the Weeknd released three bonus tracks on the album, all of which were produced by DaHeala.

== Discography ==
List of songwriting and production credits
Year	Artist(s)	Album	Song	Details
2025	The Weeknd	Hurry Up Tomorrow	"Take Me Back to LA"	Writer, Producer
2020	The Weeknd	After Hours	"Alone Again"	Writer, producer
2020	The Weeknd	After Hours	"Too Late"	Writer, producer
2020	The Weeknd	After Hours	"Snowchild"	Writer, producer
2020	The Weeknd	After Hours	"Blinding Lights"	Writer, producer
2020	The Weeknd	After Hours	"Save Your Tears"	Writer, producer
2020	The Weeknd	After Hours	"After Hours"	Writer, producer
2020	The Weeknd	After Hours	"Nothing Compares"	Writer, producer
2020	The Weeknd	After Hours	"Missed You"	Writer, producer
2020	The Weeknd	After Hours	"Final Lullaby"	Writer, producer
2019	Gesaffelstein	Hyperion	"Lost in the Fire" (feat. the Weeknd)	Writer, producer
2018	Nav	Reckless	"What I Need"	Writer, producer
2017	Lil Uzi Vert	Luv Is Rage 2	"UnFazed (feat. the Weeknd)"	Writer, producer
2017	French Montana	Jungle Rules	"A Lie (feat. the Weeknd)"	Writer, producer
2016	Halsey	Fifty Shades Darker: Original Motion Picture Soundtrack	"Not Afraid Anymore"	Producer, programming
2016	The Weeknd	Starboy	"Reminder"	Writer
2016	The Weeknd	Starboy	"Nothing Without You"	Writer
2016	The Weeknd	Starboy	"A Lonely Night"	Writer
2016	The Weeknd	Starboy	"Six Feet Under"	Writer
2016	The Weeknd	Starboy	"Starboy"	Writer
2016	Belly	Inzombia	"Die Alone"	Engineer, producer
2016	Belly	Another Day In Paradise	"Ballerina"	Engineer, producer
2016	Belly	Another Day In Paradise	"Ballerina Remix (feat. Ty Dolla $ign)"	Producer
2016	Belly	Another Day In Paradise	"It's All Love (feat. Starrah)"	Engineer, producer
2016	Future	Evol	"Low Life (feat. the Weeknd)"	Engineer, producer
2015	The Weeknd	Beauty Behind The Madness	"Dark Times"	Engineer, producer
2015	The Weeknd	Beauty Behind The Madness	"As You Are"	Engineer, producer
2015	The Weeknd	Beauty Behind The Madness	"Earned It (Fifty Shades of Grey)"	Engineer, producer
2015	The Weeknd	Beauty Behind The Madness	"Acquainted"	Engineer, producer
2015	The Weeknd	Beauty Behind The Madness	"Often"	Engineer, producer
2015	The Weeknd	Beauty Behind The Madness	"Real Life"	Engineer, producer
2014	Rick Ross	Mastermind	"In Vein (feat. the Weeknd)"	Engineer, producer
2013	The Weeknd	The Hunger Games: Catching Fire – Original Motion Picture Soundtrack	"Devil May Cry"	Writer
2013	The Weeknd	Kiss Land	"Tears In The Rain"	Engineer, producer
2013	The Weeknd	Kiss Land	"Pretty"	Engineer, producer
2013	The Weeknd	Kiss Land	"Kiss Land"	Engineer, producer
2013	The Weeknd	Kiss Land	"Wanderlust (Pharrell Remix)"	Engineer, producer
2013	The Weeknd	Kiss Land	"Wanderlust"	Engineer, producer
2013	The Weeknd	Kiss Land	"Live For" (feat. Drake)	Engineer, producer
2013	The Weeknd	Kiss Land	"Belong To The World"	Engineer, producer
2013	The Weeknd	Kiss Land	"Love In The Sky"	Engineer, producer
2013	The Weeknd	Kiss Land	"Adaptation"	Engineer, producer
2013	The Weeknd	Kiss Land	"The Town"	Engineer, producer
2013	The Weeknd	Kiss Land	"Professional"	Engineer, producer
2009	Belly	Back for the First Time Vol. 1	"Hot Girl" (feat. Snoop Dogg)	Engineer, producer
2008	Belly	Back for the First Time Vol. 1	"Get To Know You" (feat. Keshia Chanté)	Engineer, producer
2008	Belly	Back for the First Time Vol. 1	"Smells Like Money"	Engineer, producer
2007	Belly	The Revolution	"Don't Be Shy" (feat. Nina Sky)|	Engineer, producer
2007	Belly	The Revolution	"For The Love"	Engineer, producer
2007	Belly	The Revolution	"Good Evening" (feat. Kurupt)	Engineer, producer
2007	Belly	The Revolution	"Don't Be Shy (Remix)" (feat. Nina Sky)	Engineer, producer
2007	Belly	The Revolution	"The Freshest" (feat. Fabolous)	Engineer, producer
2007	Belly	The Revolution	"Follow Me"	Engineer, producer
2007	Belly	The Revolution	"Leave Me Alone"	Engineer, producer
2006	Massari	Rush The Floor	"Rush The Floor Club Mix (feat. Belly)"	Engineer, producer
2005	Massari	Massari	"Inta Hayati"	Engineer, producer
2005	Massari	Massari	"Follow My Lead"	Engineer, producer
2005	Massari	Massari	"Show Me"	Engineer, producer
2005	Massari	Massari	"Don't Let Go"	Engineer, producer
2005	Massari	Massari	"Who Knows"	Engineer, producer
2005	Massari	Massari	"Gone Away"	Engineer, producer
2005	Massari	Massari	"Rush The Floor"	Engineer, producer
2005	Massari	Massari	"Real Love"	Engineer, producer
2005	Massari	Massari	"When I Saw You.."	Engineer, producer
2005	Massari	Massari	"Smile For Me (feat. Loon)"	Engineer, producer
2005	Massari	Massari	"Be Easy"	Engineer, producer
2005	Massari	Massari	"Intro"	Engineer, producer

== Nominations and awards ==
Year	Award	Category	Nominee(s)	Result	Ref.
2015	American Music Award	Favorite Soul/R&B Album	Beauty Behind the Madness	Won	
2016	Academy Award	Best Original Song	"Earned It" (Music and lyrics by Jason Quenneville, et al.)	Nominated	
2016	Grammy Award	Best R&B Song	"Earned It" (Music and lyrics by Jason Quenneville, et al.)	Nominated	
2016	Grammy Award	Best Song Written for Visual Media	"Earned It" (Music and lyrics by Jason Quenneville, et al.)	Nominated	
2016	Grammy Award	Album of the Year	Beauty Behind the Madness (Production from Jason Quenneville)	Nominated	
2016	Grammy Award	Best Urban Contemporary Album	Beauty Behind the Madness (Production from Jason Quenneville)	Won	
2016	NAACP Image Award	Outstanding Album	Beauty Behind the Madness (Production from Jason Quenneville)	Nominated	
