= Maratone Studios =

Record label in Stockholm, Sweden

Maratone is a music production company, and started by two music producers and songwriters, Max Martin and Tom Talomaa. Based in Stockholm, Sweden, it was started in January 2001 after the closing of Cheiron Studios. Maratone moved in at Cosmos Studios after the production team Kai Erixon and Kent (Gillström) Isaacs decided to split up after working together for 10 years on numerous productions. Isaacs bought the old Abbey Road/EMI Studios that is now Cosmos Studios. Cosmos Studios is closely affiliated with Cosmos Music Group.

The first songs to be written and produced at Maratone were four tracks for Britney Spears' third album, Britney. The Maratone production crew now consists of producers/songwriters Max Martin, Rami Yacoub and Arnthor Birgisson. Alexandra Talomaa left, and is now running her own studio/production company named "Maridox Songs".

With Kelly Clarkson's hits "Since U Been Gone" and "Behind These Hazel Eyes", which were produced at Maratone, Max Martin had reinvented himself together with Dr. Luke (Lukasz Gottwald) by using a completely different sound than the "Cheiron sound" he was famous for. He has continued to use the new rock sounds on hits for Taylor Swift, Pink, Katy Perry, a-ha and many more.

== Other ventures ==
Martin eventually evolved from Maratone Studios to found and operate his own globally successful production companies, such as MXM and Wolf Cousins and has gathered numerous working affiliates, making themselves a songwriting and production collective under the label. These people are Rami Yacoub, Shellback, Rickard Goransson, Johan Carlsson, Peter Carlsson, Ilya Salmanzadeh, Ali Payami, Oscar Holter and OzGo. This also did include Dr. Luke for a short while until 2014. Songs recorded at MXM Studios include "Stone Cold" by Demi Lovato, "Birthday" and "Roar" by Katy Perry, "Scream" by Usher, and "Let There Be Love" by Christina Aguilera. In 2013, the production entity Wolf Cousins was created in Stockholm, with songs such as "Cool for the Summer" and "Confident" by Demi Lovato, "First Love" by Jennifer Lopez, and "Problem" by Ariana Grande being produced in the Wolf Cousins Studios.
