= Starboy: Legend of the Fall Tour =

2017 concert tour by the Weeknd

- Tour by the Weeknd
- Location: North America • Europe • Oceania
- Associated album: Starboy
- Start date: February 17, 2017
- End date: December 14, 2017
- Legs: 2
- No. of shows: 77
- Supporting acts: Lil Uzi Vert; Bryson Tiller; Rae Sremmurd; Belly; 6lack; Cezinando; Gucci Mane; Nav; French Montana
- Box office: $82.1 million (77 shows)

the Weeknd concert chronology
- The Madness Fall Tour (2015); Starboy: Legend of the Fall Tour (2017); The Weeknd Asia Tour (2018)

The Starboy: Legend of the Fall Tour was the fifth concert tour by Canadian singer the Weeknd, in support of his third studio album Starboy (2016). The tour started on February 17, 2017, at the Ericsson Globe in Stockholm and concluded on December 14, 2017, at RAC Arena in Perth.

== Set lists ==
=== Europe ===
This set list is representative of the show on March 13, 2017, in Birmingham. It is not representative of all concerts for the duration of the tour.

1. "All I Know" (with snippets of "The Birds")
2. "Party Monster"
3. "Reminder"
4. "Six Feet Under"
5. "Low Life" / "Might Not"
6. "Often"
7. "Acquainted"
8. "Ordinary Life" / "Stargirl Interlude"
9. "Starboy"
10. "Nothing Without You"
11. "Rockin'"
12. "Secrets" / "Can't Feel My Face"
13. "In the Night"
14. "Earned It"
15. "Wicked Games"
16. "High for This"
17. "The Morning"
18. "Sidewalks"
19. "Crew Love"
20. "Die for You"
21. "I Feel It Coming"

Encore

1. "False Alarm"
2. "Glass Table Girls"
3. "The Hills"

=== North America (leg 1) ===
This set list is representative of the show on April 26, 2017, in Seattle.

1. "Starboy"
2. "Party Monster"
3. "Reminder"
4. "Six Feet Under"
5. "Low Life"
6. "Might Not" (with Belly)
7. "Sidewalks"
8. "Crew Love"
9. "PRBLMS" (with 6LACK)
10. "Often"
11. "Acquainted"
12. "Or Nah"
13. "Some Way"
14. "Tell Your Friends" / "Die for You"
15. "True Colors"
16. "Wicked Games"
17. "Angel"
18. "Earned It"
19. "Rockin'"
20. "Black Beatles" (with Rae Sremmurd)
21. "Secrets" / "Can't Feel My Face"
22. "I Feel It Coming"
23. "The Hills"

=== Notes ===
- "Tell Your Friends" was performed at every show in Europe besides the Birmingham show on March 13, between "Crew Love" and "Die for You".
- During the show at AccorHotels Arena in Paris, on February 28, American rapper Travis Scott joined onstage and performed his songs "Antidote" and "Goosebumps".
- During the second show at the O_{2} Arena, in London, on March 8, Canadian rapper Drake joined onstage, after "Crew Love", performing "Fake Love", "Jumpman", and "Energy".
- During the first show at The Forum in Inglewood on April 27, American rapper Kendrick Lamar joined onstage to perform "Sidewalks" alongside The Weeknd, as well as his song "HUMBLE."
- During the show at Philips Arena in Atlanta, on May 13, American rapper Lil Uzi Vert joined onstage to perform their song "XO Tour Llif3".
- During the first show at the Air Canada Centre in Toronto on phase one of the tour on May 26, Drake joined onstage and performed the songs "Jumpman", "Gyalchester", which he brought out Canadian rapper Baka Not Nice during, and "Fake Love", during the show's encore.
- During the shows in Toronto on May 27, at Centre Bell in Montreal on May 30, Newark at Prudential Center on June 4, and in Cincinnati on June 9, Canadian rapper and XO signee Nav joined onstage during "Some Way".
- During the show in Newark, Travis Scott also joined onstage to perform his songs "Beibs in the Trap" with Nav, and "Goosebumps".
- During the first show at Barclays Center in Brooklyn, American rappers A$AP Rocky and Playboi Carti joined onstage and performed their songs "Lord Pretty Flacko Jodye 2 (LPFJ2)" and "Magnolia" respectively. Moroccan-American rapper French Montana also joined onstage and performed his song "Unforgettable" with Swae Lee after "Black Beatles". French Montana later joined onstage to perform "Unforgettable" during the shows at Air Canada Centre in Toronto on October 9, and Toyota Center in Houston on October 17, during phase two of the tour.
- Belly joined onstage for "Might Not" during phase two of the tour in Toronto, Sacramento, Anaheim, San Antonio, Tulsa, and Miami.

== Tour dates ==
List of concerts, showing date, city, country, venue, opening acts, tickets sold, number of available tickets and gross revenue
Date	City	Country	Venue	Opening acts	Attendance	Revenue
Europe
February 17, 2017	Stockholm	Sweden	Ericsson Globe	Lil Uzi Vert	13,783 / 14,155	$743,659
February 19, 2017	Oslo	Norway	Oslo Spektrum	Lil Uzi Vert	—N/a	—N/a
February 20, 2017	Copenhagen	Denmark	Royal Arena	Lil Uzi Vert	—N/a	—N/a
February 24, 2017	Amsterdam	Netherlands	Ziggo Dome	Lil Uzi Vert; Bryson Tiller	16,558 / 16,558	$825,481
February 26, 2017	Zürich	Switzerland	Hallenstadion	Lil Uzi Vert; Bryson Tiller	13,000 / 13,000	$1,023,907
February 28, 2017	Paris	France	AccorHotels Arena	Lil Uzi Vert; Bryson Tiller	15,245 / 15,363	$816,220
March 2, 2017	Cologne	Germany	Lanxess Arena	Lil Uzi Vert; Bryson Tiller	15,724 / 15,819	$755,483
March 3, 2017	Antwerp	Belgium	Sportpaleis	Lil Uzi Vert; Bryson Tiller	20,831 / 21,678	$920,525
March 5, 2017	Manchester	England	Manchester Arena	Lil Uzi Vert; Bryson Tiller	16,100 / 16,100	$752,377
March 7, 2017	London	England	The O_{2} Arena	Lil Uzi Vert; Bryson Tiller	34,636 / 36,094	$1,830,979
March 8, 2017	London	England	The O_{2} Arena	Lil Uzi Vert; Bryson Tiller	34,636 / 36,094	$1,830,979
March 10, 2017	Glasgow	Scotland	SSE Hydro	Lil Uzi Vert; Bryson Tiller	12,263 / 12,947	$582,444
March 11, 2017	Newcastle	England	Metro Radio Arena	Lil Uzi Vert; Bryson Tiller	10,185 / 10,415	$484,488
March 13, 2017	Birmingham	England	Barclaycard Arena	Lil Uzi Vert; Bryson Tiller	14,309 / 14,651	$701,876
March 14, 2017	Leeds	England	First Direct Arena	Lil Uzi Vert; Bryson Tiller	12,331 / 12,331	$555,372
North America
April 25, 2017	Vancouver	Canada	Rogers Arena	Rae Sremmurd; Belly; 6lack	15,856 / 15,856	$1,572,423
April 26, 2017	Seattle	United States	KeyArena	Rae Sremmurd; Belly; 6lack	13,404 / 13,713	$1,096,415
April 28, 2017	San Jose	United States	SAP Center	Rae Sremmurd; Belly; 6lack	15,399 / 15,822	$1,551,572
April 29, 2017	Inglewood	United States	The Forum	Rae Sremmurd; Belly; 6lack	30,392 / 32,346	$3,206,752
April 30, 2017	Inglewood	United States	The Forum	Rae Sremmurd; Belly; 6lack	30,392 / 32,346	$3,206,752
May 2, 2017	Phoenix	United States	Talking Stick Resort Arena	Rae Sremmurd; Belly; 6lack	14,967 / 16,128	$1,094,045
May 4, 2017	Dallas	United States	American Airlines Center	Rae Sremmurd; Belly; 6lack	15,144 / 15,889	$1,456,427
May 6, 2017	Houston	United States	Toyota Center	Belly; Nav	13,571 / 13,945	$1,346,275
May 9, 2017	New Orleans	United States	Smoothie King Center	Rae Sremmurd; Belly; 6lack	10,872 / 11,450	$829,844
May 11, 2017	Sunrise	United States	BB&T Center	Rae Sremmurd; Belly; 6lack	16,144 / 16,802	$1,327,407
May 12, 2017	Tampa	United States	Amalie Arena	Rae Sremmurd; Belly; 6lack	14,563 / 14,924	$1,055,377
May 13, 2017	Atlanta	United States	Philips Arena	Rae Sremmurd; Belly; 6lack	13,340 / 14,032	$1,191,335
May 17, 2017	Charlotte	United States	Spectrum Center	Rae Sremmurd; Belly; 6lack	12,497 / 13,069	$943,458
May 18, 2017	Washington, D.C.	United States	Verizon Center	Rae Sremmurd; Belly; 6lack	14,174 / 14,851	$1,330,993
May 19, 2017	Atlantic City	United States	Boardwalk Hall	Rae Sremmurd; Belly; 6lack	11,717 / 12,186	$1,045,012
May 23, 2017	Rosemont	United States	Allstate Arena	Rae Sremmurd; Belly; 6lack	13,898 / 14,379	$1,408,930
May 24, 2017	Auburn Hills	United States	The Palace of Auburn Hills	Rae Sremmurd; Belly; 6lack	13,431 / 13,788	$1,172,126
May 26, 2017	Toronto	Canada	Air Canada Centre	Rae Sremmurd; Belly; 6lack	30,242 / 30,244	$2,616,414
May 27, 2017	Toronto	Canada	Air Canada Centre	Rae Sremmurd; Belly; 6lack	30,242 / 30,244	$2,616,414
May 28, 2017	Ottawa	Canada	Canadian Tire Centre	Rae Sremmurd; Belly; 6lack	12,036 / 12,586	$854,383
May 30, 2017	Montreal	Canada	Bell Centre	Rae Sremmurd; Belly; 6lack	16,203 / 17,611	$1,417,468
June 2, 2017	Uncasville	United States	Mohegan Sun Arena	Rae Sremmurd; Belly; 6lack	5,862 / 8,106	$681,713
June 3, 2017	Uniondale	United States	Nassau Coliseum	Belly; 6lack	9,907 / 16,048	$920,580
June 4, 2017	Newark	United States	Prudential Center	Rae Sremmurd; Belly; 6lack	12,178 / 12,759	$1,111,710
June 6, 2017	Brooklyn	United States	Barclays Center	Rae Sremmurd; Belly; 6lack	27,862 / 29,452	$2,866,236
June 7, 2017	Brooklyn	United States	Barclays Center	Rae Sremmurd; Belly; 6lack	27,862 / 29,452	$2,866,236
June 9, 2017	Cincinnati	United States	U.S. Bank Arena	Rae Sremmurd; Belly; 6lack	12,855 / 13,264	$1,042,569
Europe
July 4, 2017	Bergen	Norway	Koengen	Bryson Tiller; Cezinando	—N/a	—N/a
North America
September 6, 2017	University Park	United States	Bryce Jordan Center	Gucci Mane; Nav	9,434 / 9,988	$620,363
September 9, 2017	Toronto	Canada	Air Canada Centre	French Montana; Nav	15,652 / 15,652	$1,522,007
September 12, 2017	Boston	United States	TD Garden	Gucci Mane; Nav	10,446 / 10,984	$1,078,385
September 15, 2017	Washington, D.C.	United States	Capital One Arena	Gucci Mane; Nav	12,136 / 13,395	$1,001,633
September 16, 2017	Philadelphia	United States	Wells Fargo Center	Gucci Mane; Nav	8,781 / 11,764	$715,128
September 19, 2017	Columbus	United States	Schottenstein Center	Gucci Mane; Nav	9,850 / 12,437	$623,740
September 20, 2017	Indianapolis	United States	Bankers Life Fieldhouse	Gucci Mane; Nav	10,853 / 11,591	$702,017
September 24, 2017	Saint Paul	United States	Xcel Energy Center	Gucci Mane; Nav	13,243 / 13,795	$1,043,627
September 26, 2017	Kansas City	United States	Sprint Center	Gucci Mane; Nav	9,439 / 10,073	$746,571
September 27, 2017	Lincoln	United States	Pinnacle Bank Arena	Gucci Mane; Nav	10,442 / 10,950	$661,139
September 29, 2017	Denver	United States	Pepsi Center	Gucci Mane; Nav	12,671 / 13,205	$1,226,637
October 2, 2017	Edmonton	Canada	Rogers Place	French Montana; Nav	14,050 / 14,050	$1,425,941
October 5, 2017	Vancouver	Canada	Rogers Arena	French Montana; Nav	14,903 / 14,903	$1,423,050
October 6, 2017	Portland	United States	Moda Center	Gucci Mane; Nav	12,669 / 13,203	$1,133,799
October 8, 2017	Oakland	United States	Oracle Arena	Gucci Mane; Nav	12,065 / 12,806	$1,318,771
October 11, 2017	Sacramento	United States	Golden 1 Center	Gucci Mane; Nav	13,825 / 14,381	$1,272,035
October 13, 2017	Anaheim	United States	Honda Center	Gucci Mane; Nav	12,358 / 13,108	$1,402,275
October 14, 2017	Las Vegas	United States	T-Mobile Arena	Gucci Mane; Nav	10,721 / 12,718	$940,575
October 17, 2017	Houston	United States	Toyota Center	Gucci Mane; Nav	9,157 / 9,624	$772,300
October 19, 2017	San Antonio	United States	AT&T Center	French Montana; Nav	13,145 / 13,771	$1,225,505
October 21, 2017	Tulsa	United States	BOK Center	Gucci Mane; Nav	11,196 / 11,632	$833,953
October 24, 2017	Miami	United States	American Airlines Arena	Gucci Mane; Nav	12,555 / 12,555	$1,064,113
October 28, 2017	Columbia	United States	Colonial Life Arena	Gucci Mane; Nav	10,737 / 11,522	$667,972
October 29, 2017	Nashville	United States	Bridgestone Arena	Gucci Mane; Nav	13,640 / 14,085	$1,048,376
November 1, 2017	Detroit	United States	Little Caesars Arena	Gucci Mane; Nav	9,508 / 10,203	$830,254
November 2, 2017	Chicago	United States	United Center	Gucci Mane; Nav	12,862 / 13,389	$1,217,383
Oceania
November 29, 2017	Auckland	New Zealand	Spark Arena	French Montana; Nav	—N/a	—N/a
December 2, 2017	Sydney	Australia	Qudos Bank Arena	French Montana; Nav	32,880 / 32,920	$3,046,233
December 3, 2017	Sydney	Australia	Qudos Bank Arena	French Montana; Nav	32,880 / 32,920	$3,046,233
December 6, 2017	Brisbane	Australia	Brisbane Entertainment Centre	French Montana; Nav	11,431 / 11,431	$1,062,510
December 8, 2017	Melbourne	Australia	Rod Laver Arena	French Montana; Nav	26,538 / 26,540	$2,526,303
December 9, 2017	Melbourne	Australia	Rod Laver Arena	French Montana; Nav	26,538 / 26,540	$2,526,303
December 11, 2017	Adelaide	Australia	Adelaide Entertainment Centre	French Montana; Nav	—N/a	—N/a
December 14, 2017	Perth	Australia	Perth Arena	French Montana; Nav	10,737 / 11,295	$942,539
Total					949,403 / 996,331 (95%)	$77,227,409

== Cancelled shows ==
Date	City	Country	Venue	Reason
May 31, 2017	Quebec City	Canada	Vidéotron Centre	Food poisoning
October 25, 2017	Orlando	United States	Amway Center	Unknown
