= The Weeknd Asia Tour =

2018 concert tour

- Continental tour by the Weeknd
- Location: Asia
- Associated albums: My Dear Melancholy; The Weeknd in Japan
- Start date: November 23, 2018
- End date: December 18, 2018
- Legs: 1
- No. of shows: 7

the Weeknd concert chronology
- Starboy: Legend of the Fall Tour (2017); The Weeknd Asia Tour (2018); Super Bowl LV halftime show (2021)

The Weeknd Asia Tour was the sixth concert tour by the Canadian singer-songwriter the Weeknd, in support of his first extended play My Dear Melancholy and his first greatest hits album The Weeknd in Japan. The tour began on November 23, 2018, in Abu Dhabi and concluded on December 18, 2018, in Chiba. It was the Weeknd's first tour in Asia and it featured a guest appearance from Kenshi Yonezu at the concert in Japan.

== Set list ==
This set list is obtained from the Hong Kong concert. It is not intended to be representative of all concerts for the duration of the tour.

1. "Pray for Me"
2. "Starboy"
3. "Party Monster"
4. "Reminder"
5. "Six Feet Under"
6. "Low Life"
7. "Might Not"
8. "Sidewalks"
9. "Crew Love"
10. "House of Balloons / Glass Table Girls"
11. "Belong to the World" / "Pretty"
12. "Secrets"
13. "Can't Feel My Face"
14. "In the Night"
15. "I Feel It Coming"
16. "The Morning"
17. "Wicked Games"
18. "Earned It"
19. "Or Nah"
20. "Often"
21. "Acquainted"
22. "Wasted Times"
23. "Call Out My Name"
24. "The Hills"
Notes
- The "Belong to the World" / "Pretty" medley and "In the Night" were part of the set list starting on November 30, 2018. They were excluded from the show in Bali, on December 9, 2018.

== Tour dates ==
List of concerts, showing date, city, country, venue, opening act, and attendance
Date	City	Country	Venue	Opening act	Attendance
November 23, 2018 (Note: Part of Formula 1 Abu Dhabi Grand Prix 2018.)	Abu Dhabi	United Arab Emirates	Du Arena	—N/a	—N/a
November 30, 2018	Hong Kong		AsiaWorld–Arena	—N/a	11,000
December 2, 2018	Bangkok	Thailand	Impact Arena	—N/a	10,000
December 5, 2018	Singapore		Singapore Indoor Stadium	—N/a	7,000
December 9, 2018 (Note: Part of Djakarta Warehouse Project 2018.)	Bali	Indonesia	Garuda Wisnu Kencana Cultural Park	—N/a	—N/a
December 15, 2018	Seoul	South Korea	Gocheok Sky Dome	—N/a	24,000
December 18, 2018	Chiba	Japan	Makuhari Messe	Kenshi Yonezu	—N/a

== Cancelled shows ==
Date	City	Country	Venue	Reason
December 7, 2018	Manila	Philippines	Mall of Asia Arena	Stage production issue
December 12, 2018	Taipei	Taiwan	Nangang C3 Field	Stage production issue
