= Lust for Life (Lana Del Rey song) =

Single by Lana Del Rey featuring the Weeknd

from the album Lust for Life
- A-side: "Love"
- Released: April 19, 2017
- Studio: The Green Building (Los Angeles)
- Genre: Dream pop; bubblegum pop
- Length: 4:24
- Label: Polydor; Interscope
- Songwriters: Lana Del Rey; Rick Nowels; Abel Tesfaye; Max Martin
- Producers: Lana Del Rey; Rick Nowels; Kieron Menzies; Dean Reid

Lana Del Rey singles chronology
"Love" (2017)	"Lust for Life" (2017)	"Summer Bummer" (2017)

The Weeknd singles chronology
"Some Way" (2017)	"Lust for Life" (2017)	"Reminder" / "Rockin'" (2017)

Music video
- "Lust for Life" on YouTube

"Lust for Life" is a song recorded by American singer-songwriter Lana Del Rey featuring Canadian singer the Weeknd. The song was written by the artists, Rick Nowels, and Max Martin and produced by Del Rey, Nowels, Dean Reid and Kieron Menzies. Martin handled the additional production. It was released on April 19, 2017, through Polydor Records and Interscope Records, as the second single from her fifth studio album of the same name (2017). A dream pop and bubblegum pop song, "Lust for Life" is reminiscent of 1960s music, especially from girl groups like the Shangri-Las and the Angels; the latter's 1963 song "My Boyfriend's Back" is referenced in the lyrics. It also quotes the poem "Invictus" by the English poet William Ernest Henley (1849–1903).

"Lust for Life" received mixed reviews from music critics: some acclaimed its sultry production that departs from the melancholic, sad themes present in Del Rey's previous works, while others criticized its lyrics as banal and the Weeknd's vocals as whiny. "Lust for Life" debuted in the top 100 of several countries, including the United States – where it peaked at 64 being the third collaboration between Del Rey and the Weeknd to enter the chart– the United Kingdom, Canada, Scotland, Portugal, Spain, Belgium and Ireland.

Its accompanying music video directed by Clark Jackson features Del Rey and the Weeknd singing on the top of the Hollywood Sign as referenced in the lyrics. Some critics pointed out a parallel between some of the lyrics and imagery accompanying the song and the 1932 suicide of actress Peg Entwistle who killed herself by jumping off the "H" of the sign. To promote "Lust for Life", the singer performed it for the first time at the 2017 KROQ Weenie Roast y Fiesta concert and later appeared at the 2017 BBC Radio 1's Big Weekend on May 27, 2017. The song was also included as the tenth track in the setlist of her fourth headlining concert tour called "LA to the Moon Tour" (2018).

== Background and release ==
"Lust for Life" was the first song Lana Del Rey wrote for the album, during the writing process she felt it as a good record, however, she wasn't really satisfied with the initial version of the track, re-editing and rewriting the lyrics several times. Watching Del Rey's indignation, Interscope's record executive John Janick suggested that she should consult producer Max Martin to see what could think of the record. She then flew to Martin's compound located in Sweden. He thought the first verse was the strongest part of what she had done, encouraging her to turn this verse into the song's chorus. She went back to Rick Nowels' place the following day where she reworked on the track addressing what Martin had suggested, she turned the verse into the chorus and for her, it sounded "perfect". That's when she felt she "really wanted" to hear Canadian singer the Weeknd sing the chorus, so he came down and "rewrote a little bit of it," but then she stated she felt like it was missing the "Shangri-Las element" that she wanted, so she went back for a fourth time and layered it up with harmonies.

"Lust for Life" was first registered at ASCAP under Del Rey's name during March 2017, with the Weeknd credited as a co-writer under his real name Abel Tesfaye. Later, Del Rey teased the collaboration on March 26, 2017, via Twitter, with Tesfaye's signature logo. The logo, which is also the logo of his record label XO, was also included in the Lust for Life album trailer. "Lust for Life" was released on April 19, 2017, following the preview on MistaJam's BBC Radio 1 show. The official audio was released to iTunes and other streaming services a few hours later. It is the fourth collaboration between Del Rey and The Weeknd, after she featured on "Prisoner" from his second studio album, Beauty Behind the Madness (2015), and then two collaborations on his follow-up record Starboy (2016): a feature on "Stargirl Interlude" and a co-writing credit and background vocals on "Party Monster". The two would collaborate again for the fifth time in The Weeknd's "The Abyss" in 2025. This is Del Rey's first song to feature another artist on any of her studio albums. On August 25, 2017, an official remix by BloodPop was released, alongside a remix for Del Rey's other single "Summer Bummer".

== Composition and lyrics ==
"Lust for Life" is reminiscent of 1960s music, with backing harmonies vocalizing around Del Rey's vocals with sung loops as "doowop-doowop" and "shooup-shooup". It has doo-wop and Motown-inspired production that recalls the music of past girl groups, with Del Rey paying homage to the Angels' 1963 single "My Boyfriend's Back." Billboard characterized it as bubblegum pop like "Love". The song is about "climb[ing] up the H" of the Hollywood Sign to dance and have sex. The first verse quotes the poem "Invictus" by the English poet William Ernest Henley (1849–1903) using the lines "We're the masters of our own fate / We're the captains of our own souls." The Weeknd appears later on in the song; complementing to Del Rey's breathy vocals during the chorus as they sing together over distorted synths, "Take off all your clothes". For Chris White of MusicOMH, they sound simultaneously "alluring and desperate." He is then heard singing his lines using his characteristic falsetto tone.

Roisin O'Connor of The Independent applauded the chemistry between the duo commenting that their mutual power is in their "ability to keep things hidden, whilst seeming utterly explicit." Neil McCormick from the British broadsheet newspaper The Daily Telegraph observed that their voices "entwine with an erotic simpatico". Sheldon Pearce of Pitchfork website added that in "Lust for Life", they play "tangled apparitions reliving a Hollywood daydream." Analyzing the lyrics, Chris Mench of Genius commented that Lana seems to reference the infamous suicide of Peg Entwistle, who killed herself by jumping off the "H" of the Hollywood sign in September 1932, at the age of 24. The A.V. Club's writer Annie Zaleski noted that the song captures the sensation of having "dizzying sexual chemistry" with someone, while The Line of Best Fit's Erik Thompson perceived "Lust for Life" fluidly blends "the sensual with the inspirational", going from the liberating assertion of being "masters of our own fate" and "captains of our own souls" to taking off all clothes in a "hot, breathless second."

== Critical reception ==
"Lust for Life" was met with a mixed reception from music critics. Libby Cudmore of Paste called "Lust for life" one of the album's "low points," emphasizing that the "vintage vibe" which the singer projected for this song "did not work so well." The editor was not enthusiastic over The Weekend's presence, saying that his "whiny-toy drone" drags the "whole Hollywood shenanigan into the tar pits." Mike Was from Idolator criticized the lyrical content by deeming it a typical and "quintessentially Lana Del Rey." Leonie Cooper of NME said that Del Rey's vocals in "Lust for Life" nearly made her a "parody of herself" and called the chorus "a bit silly, but also utterly fabulous."

Similar to Del Rey's previously released single "Love", "Lust for Life" called attention from critics who considered it as a departure from the melancholic, dark production present in her previous works. Prefix magazine's Jon O' Brian noted "Lust for Life" as one of the moments that in which Del Rey indeed a much more "optimistic and accessible" sound than her previous album Honeymoon (2015). Echoing the same sentiments as O'Brian, Andrew Dorsett from PopMatters named "Lust for Life" and "Love" as the "poppiest" moments of the album, adding that these tracks shimmer with Del Rey's "newfound optimism", but even these can ring somewhat "hollow" compared with the "smoky menace" of her past work, or the "incisive pathos of the album's deep cuts."

The Independent's Roisin O'Connor wrote that "Lust for Life" proves a "masterful pairing," and expressed a positive thought about Del Rey's collaboration with the Weeknd, stating they stand out among their peers as two artists who "have succeeded at crafting their own myth." Rolling Stone listed "Lust for Life" as the 9th-best song of 2017 in their annual ranking.

== Commercial performance ==
In the United States, "Lust for Life" debuted at spot of number 36 on Digital Songs chart based on one day of tracking. It entered the Billboard Hot 100 the following week at number 64, thus made Del Rey's eleventh chart entry, being her third collaboration with The Weeknd to reach the Hot 100 along with "Prisoner" from The Weeknd's second studio album, Beauty Behind the Madness (2015) and "Stargirl Interlude" from his third studio album Starboy (2016). "Lust for Life" additionally debuted within top ten on Hot Rock Songs chart issued for May 13, 2017. Becoming Del Rey's second highest debut on the charts, following "Love" released two months prior which debuted at number two. Outside the United States, "Lust for Life" peaked in the top forty in various countries including the United Kingdom—where it debuted at 38 on UK Singles Charts—Canada, Sweden, Scotland and Poland.

== Accolades ==
Year	Organization	Award	Result	Ref.
2018	GAFFA Awards (Sweden)	Best Foreign Song	Won	

== Music video ==
=== Development and release ===
An official audio video was released on Del Rey's Vevo channel on the same day the song was released. It features Tesfaye and Del Rey sitting on the edge of the Hollywood Sign while holding hands. The official music video was released on May 22, 2017. It was directed by Clark Jackson, who also directed the Lust for Life album trailer and produced the "Love" music video. He used similar visuals and interpolates shots from the trailer. To brings to life the same vintage aesthetic present in the song, the video bursts of a VHS-quality visual distortion. The director wanted to the video incorporate the same imagery of the 50s and 60s Hollywood. For the sign creation, Jackson wanted a night shot of it exactly as it looked in the 1950s. As the sign is not lit up anymore, he and some friends had to construct an illustration of the sign and the mountain out of papier-mâché, foam, chicken wire, and old school Hollywood-style model-making in his garage. In interview with Pitchfork he revealed that during the process, "the neighbors thought I had lost my mind when they saw me knee deep in papier-mâché. Blink and you will miss it, but all of that from the tower to the sign to the bushes and trees were all made by hand." He used the illustration which he developed as a support to recreate the sign through 3D effects for the original music video.

=== Synopsis and reception ===
The video starts off with a galaxy which turns into Del Rey's green eyes. Chelsea Stone of W Magazine noted it as reminiscent of her previous released video for "Love" in which Del Rey is seen floating through different galaxies. The singer then appears in a TV set wearing a red dress and a headband while performing a simple dance routine and sings among her two dancers Alexandra Kaye and Ashley Rodriguez in the background. As the song runs, Del Rey leaves the set and goes through a brighten, illuminated city and up a set of stairs that lead to the top of the "H" on the Hollywood sign referenced in the lyrics. In the top, she meets the Weeknd who helps her to complete her scale to the top of the letter. During the second verse, they appear sitting at the letter while appreciating the brilliant city in front of them underneath the stars. The Weeknd removes the headband from Del Rey's head and throws it away, transforming it in a caravel in the air. At the end of the video, she slides off the "D" of the Hollywood sign and lands in a field of orange flowers with the Weeknd lying by her side, the camera zooms out, showing the Earth, with lights forming a peace sign, in space.

Upon the release of the video, some critics pointed out again a parallel between some of the lyrics and imagery accompanying the song and the album Lust for Life and the 1932 suicide of actress Peg Entwistle. Alan Hanson of Uproxx described the video as a "nice cinematic yarn" and a more "eerily enjoyable tale than that of Peg's end." Crack magazine's editor also perceived the same parallel, however, he recognized that death and drama, is a common theme explored both in Del Rey's songs and videos, as he wrote, the singer is no stranger to "Hollywood lore, with her songs frequently drawing upon the storied glamour and tragedy of cinema's golden age." Christina Lee of Idolator said that the red slippers in the clip and the field of flowers in the video's final moments recall The Wizard of Oz.

== Live performances ==
Del Rey performed the song for the first time at the 2017 KROQ Weenie Roast y Fiesta concert on May 20, 2017. During the show, she also debuted the track "Cherry" from her album Lust for Life. She later appeared at the 2017 BBC Radio 1's Big Weekend on May 27, 2017, where she performed "Lust for Life" along with other songs including "Love". "Lust for Life" was also included as the tenth track of the set list for her fourth headlining concert tour called LA to the Moon Tour which began in January 2018.

== Track listing ==
Digital download
No.	Title	Length
1.	"Lust for Life" (featuring the Weeknd)	4:24

Digital download – BloodPop® Remix
No.	Title	Length
1.	"Lust for Life" (featuring the Weeknd) (BloodPop® Remix)	3:22

Digital download – The Avener Rework
No.	Title	Length
1.	"Lust for Life" (featuring the Weeknd) (The Avener Rework)	4:12

10" vinyl – "Love" / "Lust for Life" LP
No.	Title	Length
1.	"Love"	4:32
2.	"Lust for Life" (featuring the Weeknd)	4:24

== Credits and personnel ==
Credits adapted from the liner notes of Lust for Life.

Recording and management

- Recorded at The Green Building Studios (Los Angeles, California)
- Mastered at Bernie Grundman Mastering (Los Angeles, California)
- Published by MXM (administered by Kobalt) (ASCAP) / R-Rated Music administered by EMI April Music Publishing Inc (Global Music Rights) / Songs Music Publishing LLC, o/b/o Songs of SMP (ASCAP) / Sony/ATV Music Publishing (ASCAP)
- The Weeknd appears courtesy of The Weeknd XO, Inc.

Personnel

- Lana Del Rey – vocals, songwriting, production
- The Weeknd – vocals, songwriting
- Rick Nowels – production, songwriting, piano, keyboard, mellotron
- Max Martin – songwriting, additional production, bass programming
- Dean Reid – production, engineering, mixing, drums, bass guitar, percussion, synthesizer programmer, vocoder, sound effects
- Kieron Menzies – production, engineering, mixing, drums
- David Levita – electric guitar
- Zac Rae – synthesizer
- Ali Payami – drums
- Mighty Mike – bongo
- Jordan Stilwell – engineering
- Trevor Yasuda – engineering
- Adam Ayan – mastering engineer

== Charts and certifications ==
=== Weekly charts ===
Chart (2017)	Peak position
Australia (ARIA)	44
Austria (Ö3 Austria Top 40)	51
Belgium (Ultratip Bubbling Under Flanders)	17
Belgium (Ultratip Bubbling Under Wallonia)	22
Canada Hot 100 (Billboard)	39
Czech Republic Singles Digital (ČNS IFPI)	35
Finland Download (Latauslista)	11
France (SNEP)	66
Germany (GfK)	65
Greece Digital Songs (Billboard)	1
Hungary (Single Top 40)	15
Iceland (RÚV)	7
Ireland (IRMA)	33
Italy (FIMI)	58
New Zealand Heatseekers (RMNZ)	1
Poland Airplay (ZPAV)	30
Portugal (AFP)	61
Scottish Singles Sales (Official Charts)	29
Slovakia Singles Digital (ČNS IFPI)	24
Spain (Promusicae)	76
Sweden (Sverigetopplistan)	29
Switzerland (Schweizer Hitparade)	48
UK Singles (Official Charts)	38
US Billboard Hot 100	64
US Hot Rock & Alternative Songs (Billboard)	4

=== Year-end charts ===
Chart (2017)	Position
US Hot Rock Songs (Billboard)	21

=== Certifications ===
Region	Certification	Certified units/sales
Australia (ARIA)	Platinum	70,000^{‡}
Brazil (Pro-Música Brasil)	2× Platinum	120,000^{‡}
Italy (FIMI)	Gold	50,000^{‡}
New Zealand (RMNZ)	Gold	15,000^{‡}
Poland (ZPAV)	Gold	25,000^{‡}
Spain (Promusicae)	Gold	30,000^{‡}
United Kingdom (BPI)	Gold	400,000^{‡}
United States (RIAA)	Platinum	1,000,000^{‡}
^{‡} Sales+streaming figures based on certification alone.

== Release history ==
Region	Date	Format	Version	Label	Ref.
United States	April 19, 2017	Digital download; streaming	Original	Interscope	
Italy	April 28, 2017	Contemporary hit radio	Original	Polydor	
United Kingdom	April 28, 2017	Contemporary hit radio	Original	Polydor	
Various	August 25, 2017	Digital download; streaming	BloodPop® Remix	Polydor; Interscope	
Various	August 25, 2017	Digital download; streaming	The Avener Rework	Polydor; Interscope	
