= Stargirl Interlude =

2016 song by the Weeknd featuring Lana Del Rey

Song by the Weeknd featuring Lana Del Rey

from the album Starboy
- Released: November 25, 2016
- Studio: Conway (Hollywood)
- Genre: Alternative R&B; alternative pop
- Length: 1:52
- Label: XO; Republic
- Songwriters: Abel Tesfaye; Lana Del Rey; Martin McKinney; Timothy McKenzie
- Producers: Doc McKinney; Labrinth

Audio
- "Stargirl Interlude" on YouTube

"Stargirl Interlude" is a song by Canadian singer-songwriter the Weeknd featuring American singer-songwriter Lana Del Rey. The track comes from his third studio album, Starboy (2016). The track's title itself is a direct reference to the album's titular character, Starboy, with the lyrics focusing in on a female counterpart, named Stargirl. The song was written by the artists alongside producers Martin "Doc" McKinney and Labrinth.

It is the second of the four collaborations (five counting "Party Monster") between the two, and was followed by the title track from Lana Del Rey's fifth studio album Lust for Life (2017).

== Background ==
Having been friends since 2012, Del Rey and the Weeknd had previously collaborated on his 2015 track, "Prisoner" from his album, Beauty Behind the Madness. Following this, the two collaborated again in several studio sessions in 2015, resulting in the Starboy tracks "Stargirl Interlude" and "Party Monster", the latter of which Del Rey co-wrote and was an uncredited vocalist for.

== Commercial performance ==
Following the release of Starboy, several of the non-single tracks from the album debuted on numerous music charts, with "Stargirl Interlude" peaking at 61 on the US Billboard Hot 100 and 73 on the UK Singles Chart. The song additionally appeared on the Billboard Hot R&B Songs chart, peaking at number 21. In 2022, "Stargirl Interlude" saw an increase in consumption as the song went viral on the social media platform TikTok alongside fellow album track "Die for You". This increase in streaming and sales lead to the song's parent album to re-enter the top 40 on the Billboard 200 chart, as well as the song itself to receive recognition as the most streamed interlude on Spotify, an accomplishment celebrated by the Weeknd himself.

== Charts ==
=== Weekly charts ===
Weekly chart performance for "Stargirl Interlude"
Chart (2016–2023)	Peak position
Canada Hot 100 (Billboard)	51
Greece International (IFPI)	26
Ireland (IRMA)	78
Lithuania (AGATA)	66
Netherlands (Single Top 100)	93
Portugal (AFP)	60
UK Singles (OCC)	73
UK Hip Hop/R&B (OCC)	21
US Billboard Hot 100	61
US Hot R&B/Hip-Hop Songs (Billboard)	21

=== Year-end charts ===
Year-end chart performance for "Stargirl Interlude"
Chart (2022)	Position
Lithuania (AGATA)	91

== Certifications ==
Certifications for "Stargirl Interlude"
Region	Certification	Certified units/sales
Brazil (Pro-Música Brasil)	Gold	30,000^{‡}
Canada (Music Canada)	Gold	40,000^{‡}
Denmark (IFPI Danmark)	Gold	45,000^{‡}
France (SNEP)	Platinum	200,000^{‡}
Italy (FIMI)	Gold	50,000^{‡}
New Zealand (RMNZ)	2× Platinum	60,000^{‡}
Poland (ZPAV)	2× Platinum	100,000^{‡}
Spain (Promusicae)	Gold	30,000^{‡}
United Kingdom (BPI)	Platinum	600,000^{‡}
Streaming
Greece (IFPI Greece)	2× Platinum	4,000,000^{†}
^{‡} Sales+streaming figures based on certification alone.^{†} Streaming-only figures based on certification alone.
