= Daniel Wilson (musician) =

American singer-songwriter

- Born: 1990 (age 34–35); Michigan, United States
- Genres: Indie rock, R&B, New Wave, Baroque Pop
- Occupation(s): Musician, songwriter, producer
- Instrument(s): Vocals, piano
- Labels: Supersonic
- Website: soundcloud.com/danielwilson

Daniel Wilson is an American singer, songwriter and record producer from Ypsilanti, Michigan, United States. His debut EP, Young Rubbish, was released in 2014 by the London-based record label Zap Records, and featured production credits by Sam Billen and Ryan Pinkston. His latest EP release, Boy Who Cried Thunder, was released in November 2014 also on Zap Records. In 2016, he contributed with The Weeknd in co-writing and producing "Sidewalks", featuring vocals from Kendrick Lamar, which appears in his third album, entitled Starboy. In 2020, he released the single Near Me, which he co-wrote and produced with Andrew Horowitz and Elliot Jacobson. He has also worked with notable artists, producers and musicians such as Miguel, Twin Shadow, Joe Goddard, ZHU, DJ Dahi, Leo Abrahams among many others.

== Biography ==
Growing up "on a diet of gospel, Christian music, musicals and '90s MTV", Daniel Wilson started his musical trajectory at the age of 13 in a gospel choir. His first solo compositions came to life in 2008 using his mother's old tape recorder and, eventually, switching to cheap computer software. The artist was signed by London-based music label Zap Records in 2013.

== Music ==
Wilson's music can be described as a sort of "indie-ish synthetic R&B, in parts electronic and ecclesiastic", while his particular crooning skills grant him a "rare, elastic falsetto". Musical influences range from Michael and Janet Jackson, Prince, Mariah Carey, and gospel music, and his music can be compared to those recorded by acts including Blood Orange, Bloc Party, and TV on the Radio.

== Discography ==
=== EPs ===
- Young Rubbish (2014), Zap Records
- Boy Who Cried Thunder (2014), Zap Records
- Sinner of The Week (2016), Zap Records

=== Songwriting and production discography ===
Title	Year	Artist(s)	Album	Credits	Written with:	Produced with:
"Home"	2016	Aurora	All My Demons Greeting; Me as a Friend	Co-writer	Thomas Hull	-
"Sidewalks" (featuring Kendrick Lamar)	2016	The Weeknd	Starboy	Co-writer/Additional producer	Abel Tesfaye, Martin McKinney, Robert John Richardson, Kendrick Lamar Duckworth, Ali Shaheed Jones-Muhammad	Doc McKinney, Bobby Raps, Ali Shaheed Muhammad
"Home" (featuring Daniel Wilson)	2017	Joe Goddard	Electric Lines	Co-writer/Featured artist	Joseph Goddard, Gerald Kent	-
"Ouch"	2017	Phlake	Weird Invitations	Co-writer	Jonathan Elkær, Mads Bo Iversen, Gisli Gislason	-
"Gone" (featuring Alina Baraz)	2017	Phlake	Weird Invitations	Co-writer	Jonathan Elkær, Mads Bo Inversen, Alina Baraz	-
"IKEA Episodes"	2017	Phlake	Weird Invitations	Co-writer	Jonathan Elkær, Mads Bo Iversen, Gisli Gislason, Scott Effman	-
"A Weird Invitation"	2017	Phlake	Weird Invitations	Co-writer	Jonathan Elkær, Mads Bo Iversen	-
"The Rascal"	2017	Phlake	Weird Invitations	Co-writer	Jonathan Elkær, Mads Bo Iversen	-
"I Don't Wanna Die Sane"	2017	Phlake	Weird Invitations	Co-writer	Jonathan Elkær, Mads Bo Iversen, Alina Baraz	-
"Brush"	2017	Phlake	Weird Invitations	Co-writer	Jonathan Elkær, Mads Bo Iversen, Gisli Gislason, JP Saxe, Robin Hannibal	-
"maybeDOTcom"	2017	Phlake	Weird Invitations	Co-writer	Jonathan Elkær, Mads Bo Iversen	-
"Kerosome"	2017	Phlake	Weird Invitations	Co-writer	Jonathan Elkær, Mads Bo Iversen, Gisli Gislason	-
"Winnebago" (featuring Quinn XCII & Daniel Wilson)	2018	Gryffin	Non-album single	Featured artist/Co-writer	Daniel Griffith, Luke Niccoli, Justin Raisen, Jeremih Raisen	-
"Guilty Love"	2018	Zhu	Ringos Desert	Co-writer	Steven Zhu, Mitch Bell	-
"Burn Babylon" (featuring Keznamdi & Daniel Wilson)	2018	Zhu	Ringos Desert	Featured artist/Co-writer	Steven Zhu, Mitch Bell, Kezmandi McDonald, Aron Leibowitz	-
"Paper Dreams"	2018	Jamie N Commons	Non-album single	Co-writer	Jamie N Commons, Samuel de Jong	-
"G.A.L." (featuring Daniel Wilson)	2018	Touch Sensitive	Non-album single	Featured artist/Co-writer	Michael Di Francesco, Ivan More, Angela Winbush, Margaret Rogers, Greg Kurstin	-
"Sanctuary"	2019	Joji	Nectar	Co-writer	Justin Raisen, Luke Niccoli, George Miller	-
"Run"	2020	Joji	Nectar	Co-writer	Justin Parker, George Miller	-
"High Hopes" (featuring Omar Apollo)	2020	Joji	Nectar	Co-writer	George Miller, Omar Apollo, Caloway, Bēkon	-
"Afterthought" (featuring BENEE)	2020	Joji	Nectar	Co-writer	George Miller, Stella Bennett, Isaac Sleator	-
