= I Feel It Coming =

2016 single by the Weeknd featuring Daft Punk

Single by the Weeknd featuring Daft Punk

from the album Starboy
- Released: November 17, 2016
- Recorded: 2016
- Studio: Gang (Paris, France); Conway (Hollywood, California); Henson (Hollywood, California)
- Genre: Disco-pop; funk
- Length: 4:29: 3:55 (radio edit)
- Label: XO; Republic
- Songwriters: Abel Tesfaye; Thomas Bangalter; Guy-Manuel de Homem-Christo; Eric Chedeville; Henry Walter; Martin McKinney
- Producer: Daft Punk

The Weeknd singles chronology
"False Alarm" (2016)	"I Feel It Coming" / "Party Monster" (2016)	"Some Way" (2017)

Daft Punk singles chronology
"Starboy" (2016)	"I Feel It Coming" (2016)	"The Writing of Fragments of Time" (2023)

Music video
- "I Feel It Coming" on YouTube

"I Feel It Coming" is a song by the Canadian singer the Weeknd from his third studio album, Starboy (2016), featuring the French electronic music duo Daft Punk. The three wrote and produced the song with Doc McKinney and Cirkut, with additional writing from Eric Chedeville. XO and Republic Records released the track for digital download on November 17, 2016, as the album's third single. Described as a disco-pop and funk track, the instrumental of "I Feel It Coming" includes prickly rhythm guitars and percolating synths. Lyrically, it sees the Weeknd attempting to convince a woman to not be afraid of falling in love again.

Music critics compared the Weeknd's vocals to Michael Jackson's. It was included on multiple year-end rankings of the best songs of 2016, and won the 2018 BMI R&B/Hip Hop Song of the Year. The song reached the top of the music charts in France, and peaked within the top five in twelve countries. In the United States, it reached number 4 on the Billboard Hot 100, spent 26 weeks on the chart, and received an 8× platinum certification by the Recording Industry Association of America (RIAA).

Warren Fu directed the music video for "I Feel It Coming" in one day at a Los Angeles soundstage. The video features a couple, played by the Weeknd and Kiko Mizuhara, dancing together on a desert planet until they turn into stone. The Weeknd has performed the song on three of his concert tours: the Starboy: Legend of the Fall Tour (2017), his Asia Tour (2018), and the After Hours til Dawn Tour (2022–2026).

== Background and release ==
After the release of his second studio album, Beauty Behind the Madness (2015), the Weeknd began recording new music in May 2016. In an interview with Billboard on July 15, the executive vice president for Republic Records revealed that the Weeknd and the French electronic duo Daft Punk were set to have a session two days from then. On September 21, the Weeknd announced his third studio album, Starboy, and released the album's title track featuring Daft Punk hours later. In an interview with The Wall Street Journal on November 4, the Weeknd revealed that along with the title track, another song between him and the duo was made for the album.

On November 16, the Weeknd announced Starboy's third and fourth singles, "I Feel It Coming" and "Party Monster", which were released the following day through ITunes simultaneously. Universal Music Group sent it to Italian radio on December 9. In the United States, XO and Republic sent the track to rhythmic contemporary radio on December 6, and contemporary hit radio on January 3, 2017.

== Music and recording ==
=== Music and lyrics ===
"I Feel It Coming" is a disco-pop and funk track which runs for a period of four minutes and 29 seconds. The track's production is understated, featuring a bass line described by GQ as "funky", alongside prickly rhythm guitars and percolating, gleaming synths. Complex noted that the song's title could refer to an orgasm.

The track's lyrical content is about the Weeknd reassuring his lover to not be scared of falling in love again. Departing from the Weeknd's usual "hedonistic approach to romance", the Weeknd attempts to persuade a woman to try him out, despite her past relationships: "You've been scared of love and what it did to you / You don't have to run, I know what you've been through".

=== Recording ===
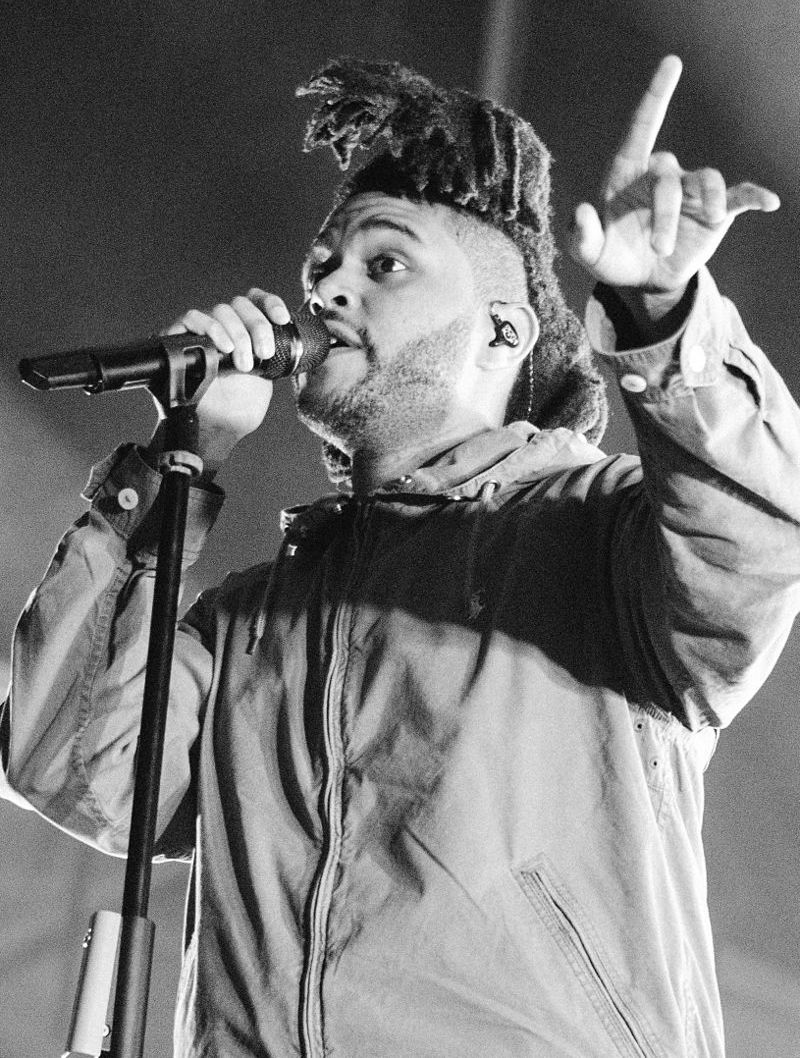
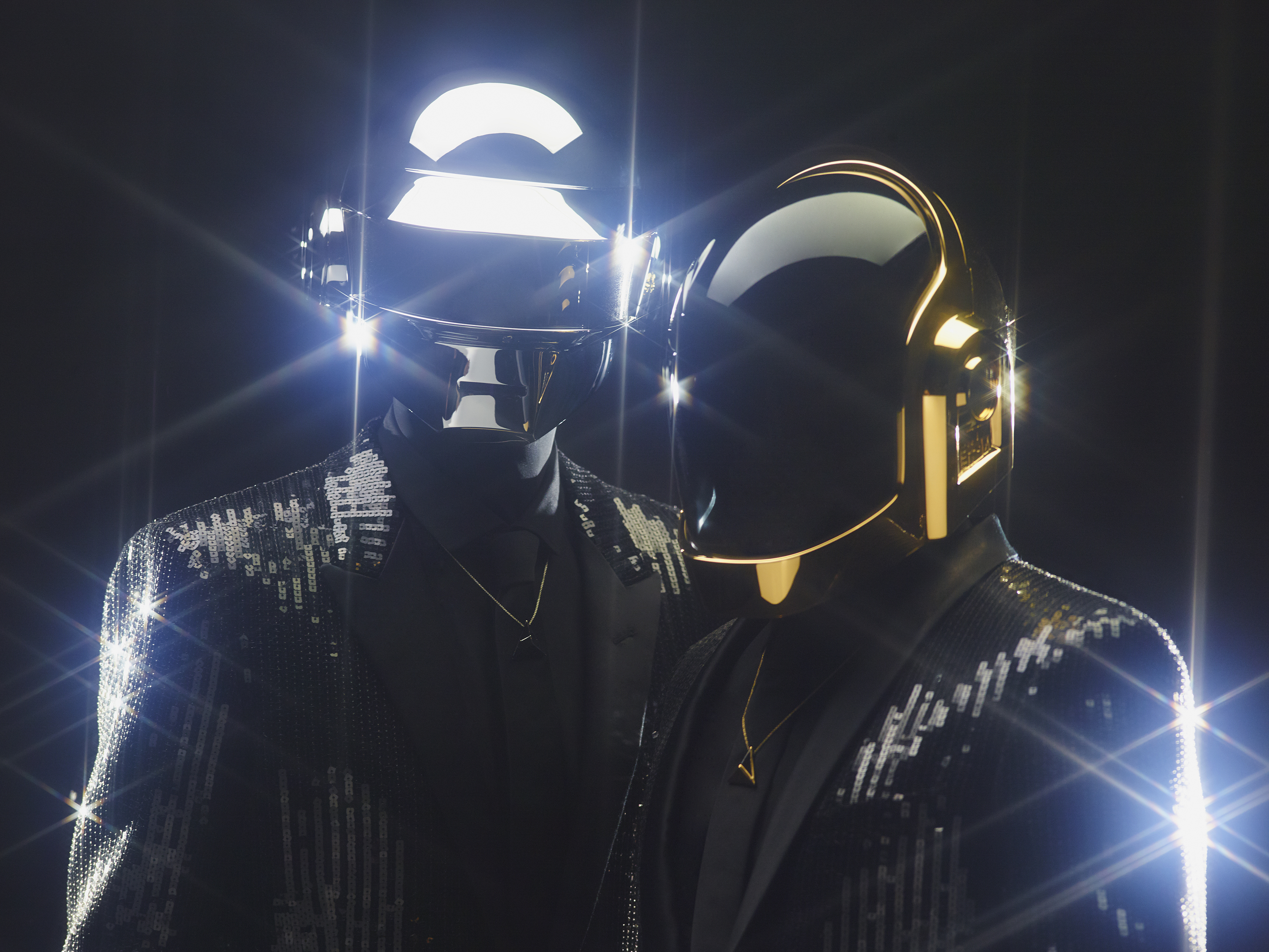
The Weeknd (left) finished the song with Daft Punk (right) in four days.

The Weeknd first met one half of Daft Punk, Guy-Manuel de Homem-Christo, at a party in Los Angeles. He later recalled his desire to work with them:

I just wanted to get into the studio with them — I didn't even care if we made music, I just wanted to be friends. I met Guy-Man first, out partying in L.A., and I actually partied with him more than I worked with him. He'd would [sic] tell me, with loud music playing over drinks, how much he liked my work.

At a Paris recording studio, Daft Punk presented him with the song's draft instrumental. After freestyling over it, the Weeknd wrote the song in one hour, and started recording. For an "authentic and retro" sound to the Weeknd's vocals, Daft Punk utilized vintage microphones and signal chains. Work on the song was paused after the Weeknd heard the drum beat for Starboy's title track; both songs were finished in four days. "I Feel It Coming" was initially recorded in Los Angeles with live musicians; the song was later sent to the producers Doc McKinney and Cirkut, where they finished production at Conway Recording Studios.

== Critical reception ==
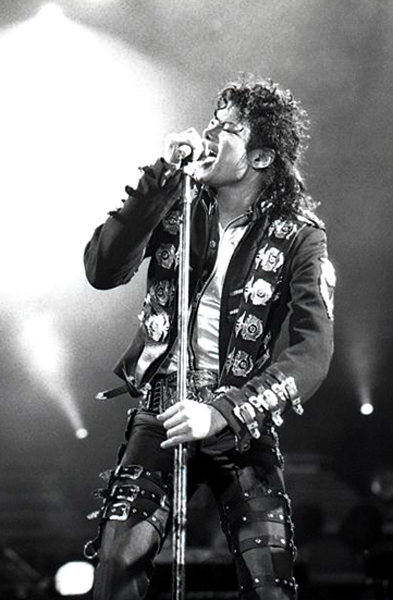
Critics compared the Weeknd's vocals to the vocals of the American singer Michael Jackson.

=== Reviews ===
Upon its release, music critics likened the Weeknd's vocals of "I Feel It Coming" to Michael Jackson's, with Sam Wolfson of The Guardian stating that it sounded like Jackson singing over a Shalamar beat. PopMatters's Adriane Pontecorvo wrote that the Weeknd's high notes make him sound more like Jackson than before. Uproxx's Delenda Joseph opined that the song could have said "featuring Michael Jackson" due to the similarities between the two's voices. The Los Angeles Times likened the song's production to Jackson's 1982 song "Human Nature". Writing for Vice, Angus Harrison attributed the song's success to its simplicity, calling its production "understated and small sounding".

Other reviews noted the song's more positive content from the Weeknd's other tracks. Slant's Jesse Cataldo stated that the Weeknd lets go of his usual "love 'em and leave 'em" stance to try out a "bid at sexual healing." Jon Caramanica of The New York Times called it "tender and dreamy", adding that it serves as a positive reply to Starboy's more colder tracks. Rolling Stone's Mosi Reeves noted that "I Feel It Coming" musically contrasts with the title track's dark-techno production, encouraging the Weeknd to abandon the "unrepentant night creature" image.

=== Rankings ===
Multiple news outlets placed "I Feel It Coming" on their lists of 2016's best songs; Spin placed it at number 99, Entertainment Weekly ranked it at number 51, and Complex placed the song at number ten on their year-end list. Billboard ranked it at number 9 on their list of the 100 best songs of 2017, writing that it offered hope to people who wanted more from a relationship. Consequence ranked the track as the Weeknd's sixth best song, noting that the song does not take the Weeknd's usual self-indulgent approach to romance, making a case for being more than lovers.

== Commercial performance ==
In the Weeknd's native Canada, "I Feel It Coming" had his fourth top-ten hit on the Canadian Hot 100; its run on the chart began on December 10, 2016, and got to its number-ten peak on April 1, 2017. The song was also a top-ten hit of the singles chart for Australia, New Zealand, and the UK Singles Chart, where it debuted at number 18 before going to its number-nine peak position the following week. It reached the top five in several non-English-speaking countries, becoming the Weeknd's second and Daft Punk's third number-one, and both artists' longest running song on the French Singles Chart until the former's 2019 song "Blinding Lights", The song notched the Weeknd his second diamond certification in France, while being certified multi-platinum in several other countries..

In the United States, "I Feel It Coming" jumped 26 spots to number 22 on the Billboard Hot 100 after the release of Starboy, with an increase to 11.2 million streams in the country. After the Weeknd and Daft Punk's performance at the 2017 Grammy Awards, the track rose seven spots to number nine on the chart dated March 4, 2017. With the release of the song's music video, alongside an iTunes discount, it jumped seven spots to number five on the chart dated April 1, 2017, peaking at the fourth spot two weeks later, and overall spending 26 weeks on the chart. The Recording Industry Association of America (RIAA) certified the single 8× platinum, which denotes eight million units based on sales and track-equivalent on-demand streams.

== Music video ==
=== Development ===
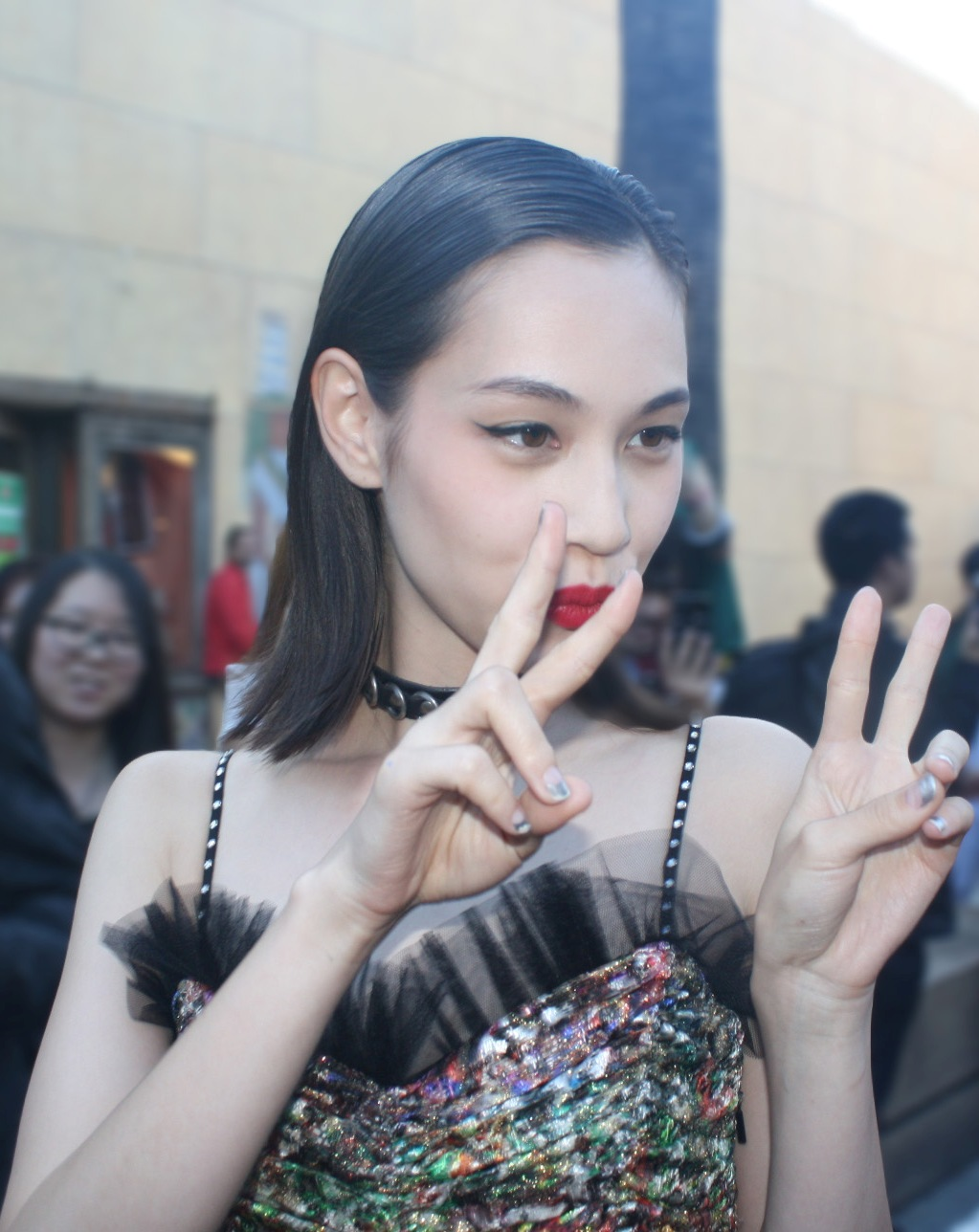
The Japanese-American model Kiko Mizuhara (pictured in 2015) makes an appearance in the video.

Warren Fu directed the song's music video, which was shot in a Los Angeles soundstage within one day in Christmas 2016. In an interview with Billboard, Fu stated that his elevator pitch for the video was a "love story in a cursed land." Drawing inspiration from plaster castings of victims from the eruption of Mount Vesuvius in 79 AD, he asked the Weeknd to mimic the pose of someone reaching out while filming. Fu used a pink and blue color palette, wanting to reinforce a vintage aesthetic, likening it to the 1980s TV series Knight Rider. For a "worldwide, non-national feel", he pushed for the Japanese-American model Kiko Mizuhara to be the video's female lead.

It premiered on March 10, 2017, on the Weeknd's Vevo channel. It stars the Weeknd and Mizuhara as a romantic couple, with Daft Punk appearing at the ending of the video. Writing for iHeartRadio, Trey Taylor noted that some scenes in the video shared similarities to the music videos for Michael Jackson's songs, specifically for the 1982 single, "Billie Jean". Taylor further noted that it takes inspiration from the films 2001: A Space Odyssey (1968) and Terminator 2: Judgment Day (1991).

=== Synopsis ===
The video features the Weeknd dancing in a deserted planet, as he waits for a woman entombed in stone to return to life. As he dances, she suddenly appears in a glowing form, and they watch sunsets and shooting stars together, until she returns to her stone state following an eclipse. To the Weeknd's horror, she crumbles. After seeing a black snake emerge from the rubble, the Weeknd attempts to reach for it, before turning into stone himself. After he erodes and becomes covered by snow, Daft Punk appears, playing cloaked explorers who find the Weeknd's remains.

== Live performances ==
The Weeknd performed "I Feel It Coming" for the first time on November 24, 2016, as a medley with "Starboy" on The Tonight Show Starring Jimmy Fallon. The song was performed the following night at the iHeartRadio Canada Jingle Ball. On February 12, 2017, he performed the song with Daft Punk at the 2017 Grammy Awards. For the performance, Daft Punk entered a stage which Rolling Stone's Elias Leight described as being "covered with fake ice formations", with the Weeknd using hand gestures, keeping his movements at a minimum. The song was included on the set list for three of the Weeknd's concert tours: the Starboy: Legend of the Fall Tour (2017), Asia Tour (2018) (Note: Attributed to Billboard for the show in Japan, The Korea Times for South Korea, The National for Abu Dhabi, and The Straits Times for Singapore.) and the After Hours til Dawn Tour (2022–2023).

On November 4, 2017, the Weeknd performed the song at the NRJ Music Awards. The song was included on the set list for his headlining performance at the Coachella Valley Music and Arts Festival on 2018 and 2022. He performed it during his festival appearances throughout 2018, such as the Mawazine Music Festival, the Life Is Beautiful Music & Art Festival, and the Global Citizen Festival. On February 7, 2021, the song was included in the set list of the Weeknd's Super Bowl LV halftime show.

== Accolades ==
Awards and nominations for "I Feel It Coming"
Organization	Year	Category	Result	Ref.
ASCAP Pop Music Awards	2018	Award Winning Songs	Won	
Billboard Music Awards	2017	Top R&B Collaboration	Nominated	
BMI Film & TV Awards	2018	BMI R&B/Hip Hop Song of the Year	Won	
Juno Awards	2018	Single of the Year	Nominated	
NRJ Music Awards	2018	International Song of the Year	Nominated	
SOCAN Music Awards	2018	Pop Music Award	Won	

== Credits ==
Adapted from the liner notes of Starboy.

=== Recording and management ===
- Recorded at Gang Studio (Paris, France), Henson Recording Studios, and Conway Recording Studios (Los Angeles, California)
- Engineered at Mixstar Studios (Virginia Beach, Virginia)
- Mastered at Sterling Sound (New York City, New York)

=== Personnel ===
- The Weeknd – lead vocals, co-production, songwriting
- Daft Punk – production, vocals, songwriting
- Eric Chedeville – songwriting, synth
- Paul Jackson Jr. – guitar
- John "J.R." Robinson – drums
- Chris Caswell – keyboards
- Nathan East – bass
- Dylan Wiggins – additional bass
- Serban Ghenea – mixing
- Cirkut – co-production, engineering
- Doc McKinney – co-production, engineering
- Florian Lagatta – sound engineering
- Josh Smith – engineering
- John Hanes – engineering
- Tom Coyne – mastering
- Aya Merrill – mastering

== Charts ==
=== Weekly charts ===
Chart performance for "I Feel It Coming"
Chart (2016–2021)	Peak position
Argentina Airplay (Monitor Latino)	4
Australia (ARIA)	7
Austria (Ö3 Austria Top 40)	23
Belarus Airplay (Eurofest)	35
Belgium (Ultratop 50 Flanders)	3
Belgium (Ultratop 50 Wallonia)	3
Canada Hot 100 (Billboard)	10
Canada AC (Billboard)	4
Canada CHR/Top 40 (Billboard)	2
Canada Hot AC (Billboard)	3
Colombia (National-Report)	42
Croatia International Airplay (Top lista)	40
Czech Republic Airplay (ČNS IFPI)	12
Czech Republic Singles Digital (ČNS IFPI)	5
Denmark (Tracklisten)	6
Ecuador (National-Report)	9
Euro Digital Song Sales (Billboard)	7
Finland (Suomen virallinen lista)	11
France (SNEP)	1
Germany (GfK)	29
Global 200 (Billboard)	75
Hungary (Dance Top 40)	37
Hungary (Rádiós Top 40)	10
Hungary (Single Top 40)	4
Hungary (Stream Top 40)	8
Ireland (IRMA)	9
Israel International Airplay (Media Forest)	2
Italy (FIMI)	13
Japan Hot 100 (Billboard)	63
Lebanon (Lebanese Top 20)	8
Mexico Airplay (Billboard)	7
Netherlands (Dutch Top 40)	3
Netherlands (Single Top 100)	4
New Zealand (Recorded Music NZ)	7
Norway (VG-lista)	5
Paraguay Airplay (Monitor Latino)	6
Poland Airplay (ZPAV)	3
Portugal (AFP)	2
Romania (Airplay 100)	26
Russia Airplay (Tophit)	14
Scottish Singles Sales (Official Charts)	17
Slovakia Airplay (ČNS IFPI)	9
Slovakia Singles Digital (ČNS IFPI)	5
Slovenia (SloTop50)	13
Spain (Promusicae)	6
Sweden (Sverigetopplistan)	5
Switzerland (Schweizer Hitparade)	7
UK Singles (Official Charts)	9
Uruguay Airplay (Monitor Latino)	11
US Billboard Hot 100	4
US Adult Contemporary (Billboard)	20
US Adult Pop Airplay (Billboard)	12
US Dance Club Songs (Billboard)	12
US Dance Airplay (Billboard)	9
US Hot R&B/Hip-Hop Songs (Billboard)	2
US Pop Airplay (Billboard)	3
US R&B/Hip-Hop Airplay (Billboard)	31
US Rhythmic Airplay (Billboard)	6

=== Year-end charts ===
2016 year-end chart performance for "I Feel It Coming"
Chart (2016)	Position
Hungary (Stream Top 40)	76
Netherlands (Dutch Top 40)	97

2017 year-end chart performance for "I Feel It Coming"
Chart (2017)	Position
Argentina Airplay (Monitor Latino)	4
Australia (ARIA)	39
Belgium (Ultratop Flanders)	12
Belgium (Ultratop Wallonia)	5
Canada (Canadian Hot 100)	23
CIS Airplay (Tophit)	80
Denmark (Tracklisten)	20
France (SNEP)	12
Hungary (Rádiós Top 40)	47
Hungary (Single Top 40)	25
Hungary (Stream Top 40)	54
Iceland (Tónlistinn)	3
Israel International Airplay (Media Forest)	3
Italy (FIMI)	56
Latvia Airplay (LaIPA)	42
Netherlands (Dutch Top 40)	47
Netherlands (Single Top 100)	52
New Zealand (Recorded Music NZ)	37
Poland (Polish Airplay Top 100)	29
Romania (Airplay 100)	73
Russia Airplay (Tophit)	77
Spain (PROMUSICAE)	72
Sweden (Sverigetopplistan)	53
Switzerland (Schweizer Hitparade)	27
UK Singles (OCC)	66
US Billboard Hot 100	34
US Adult Contemporary (Billboard)	43
US Adult Top 40 (Billboard)	32
US Dance/Mix Show Airplay (Billboard)	32
US Hot R&B/Hip-Hop Songs (Billboard)	17
US Mainstream Top 40 (Billboard)	17
US Rhythmic (Billboard)	34

2018 year-end chart performance for "I Feel It Coming"
Chart (2018)	Position
Argentina Airplay (Monitor Latino)	84

Year-end chart performance
Chart (2025)	Position
Argentina Anglo Airplay (Monitor Latino)	92

== Certifications ==
Certifications for "I Feel It Coming"
Region	Certification	Certified units/sales
Australia (ARIA)	8× Platinum	560,000^{‡}
Austria (IFPI Austria)	Platinum	30,000^{‡}
Belgium (BRMA)	Platinum	20,000^{‡}
Brazil (Pro-Música Brasil)	2× Diamond	500,000^{‡}
Canada (Music Canada)	Diamond	800,000^{‡}
Denmark (IFPI Danmark)	4× Platinum	360,000^{‡}
France (SNEP)	Diamond	233,333^{‡}
Germany (BVMI)	Platinum	400,000^{‡}
Italy (FIMI)	3× Platinum	150,000^{‡}
Mexico (AMPROFON)	Gold	30,000^{‡}
New Zealand (RMNZ)	6× Platinum	180,000^{‡}
Norway (IFPI Norway)	Platinum	40,000^{‡}
Poland (ZPAV)	3× Platinum	150,000^{‡}
Portugal (AFP)	3× Platinum	30,000^{‡}
Spain (Promusicae)	2× Platinum	120,000^{‡}
Sweden (GLF)	3× Platinum	120,000^{‡}
United Kingdom (BPI)	3× Platinum	1,800,000^{‡}
United States (RIAA)	8× Platinum	8,000,000^{‡}
^{‡} Sales+streaming figures based on certification alone.

== Release history ==
Release dates and formats for "I Feel It Coming"
Region	Date	Format	Label(s)	Ref.
Worldwide	November 17, 2016	Digital download	XO; Republic	
United States	December 6, 2016	Rhythmic contemporary	XO; Republic	
Italy	December 9, 2016	Radio airplay	Universal	
United States	January 3, 2017	Contemporary hit radio	XO; Republic	
