= False Alarm (The Weeknd song) =

2016 single by the Weeknd

Single by the Weeknd

from the album Starboy
- Released: September 29, 2016
- Recorded: 2016
- Studio: Conway (Los Angeles)
- Genre: Dance-punk; post-punk; electro-rock
- Length: 3:50
- Label: XO; Republic
- Songwriters: Abel Tesfaye; Martin McKinney; Benjamin Diehl; Henry Russell Walter; Emmanuel Nickerson; Ahmad Balshe
- Producers: Doc McKinney; The Weeknd; Cirkut; Mano

The Weeknd singles chronology
"Starboy" (2016)	"False Alarm" (2016)	"I Feel It Coming" / "Party Monster" (2016)

Music video
- "False Alarm" on YouTube

"False Alarm" is a song by the Canadian singer-songwriter the Weeknd, from his third studio album, Starboy (2016). It was released as the album's second single on September 29, 2016, through XO and Republic Records. The song was written and produced by the Weeknd, Doc McKinney, Cirkut, and Mano, with additional writing credits going to Belly and Ben Billions.

== Background and release ==
The song was revealed to be the third track from Starboy, when pre-orders for the album became available on iTunes. "False Alarm" was released as the second single from the album on September 29, 2016.

== Composition ==
"False Alarm" runs for a duration of three minutes and fifty seconds, and has been described by critics as a dance-punk and electro-rock track. Lyrically, the song revolves around drugs, unromantic relationships and materialism.

== Music video ==
The song's music video was released on October 13, 2016, and was directed by Ilya Naishuller. It depicts a bank robbery through the first-person perspective of one of the robbers. Due to the graphic violence in the video, a disclaimer was put in the opening, warning that explicit content could advise viewer discretion. This video was also made to look like it was done in one take.

=== Synopsis ===
The video begins with the heist underway, with the protagonist (the Weeknd), a robber wearing a red skull mask (Randy Irwin), a robber wearing a yellow skull mask (Sam Hale), a robber wearing a white skull mask (Damion Poitier), and a robber wearing a black skull mask loading money into three bags while the police start to show up outside. The team heads to the back exit to escape, taking a young woman (Kristine Froseth) hostage in the process. The team loads all the money and the hostage into a van, although the black-masked, white-masked, and yellow-masked robbers are killed by the police.

Another van shows up for the surviving robbers to board and throw the money onto. The first bag makes it onto the new van, but the second bag is lost, and the protagonist chooses to throw the hostage into the new van instead of the last bag of money before boarding it himself, which infuriates the red-masked robber. After the first van crashes into a parked car and explodes before the driver can board the second with the last bag of money, the red-masked robber attempts to kill the protagonist. The hostage shoots the red-masked robber with one of his own guns, allowing the protagonist to finish him off, but a stray bullet kills the driver. Without anyone behind the wheel, the van is sent into a ditch by an oncoming truck while the protagonist shields the hostage with his body.

Both the hostage and the protagonist survive the crash, but a large piece of glass becomes lodged in the latter's stomach. Incapacitated from his injury, the protagonist is unable to prevent the hostage from abandoning him with a bag of money. As the police travel closer to the scene and the sirens become progressively louder, the protagonist looks into a mirror, revealing his identity as the singer himself. The Weeknd points the gun to himself and commits suicide, as the screen cuts to black.

== Live performances ==
The Weeknd performed "False Alarm" during the season 42 premiere of Saturday Night Live on October 1, 2016.

== Appearances in other media ==
"False Alarm" was the official theme song of WWE's 2016 Survivor Series pay-per-view.

== Charts ==
Chart (2016)	Peak position
Australia (ARIA)	72
Australia Urban (ARIA)	9
Canada Hot 100 (Billboard)	33
Czech Republic Singles Digital (ČNS IFPI)	38
France (SNEP)	98
Ireland (IRMA)	65
Netherlands (Single Top 100)	79
New Zealand Heatseekers (Recorded Music NZ)	1
Portugal (AFP)	45
Scottish Singles Sales (Official Charts)	86
Slovakia Singles Digital (ČNS IFPI)	25
Sweden (Sverigetopplistan)	89
Switzerland (Schweizer Hitparade)	85
UK Singles (Official Charts)	51
US Billboard Hot 100	55
US Hot R&B/Hip-Hop Songs (Billboard)	23

== Certifications ==
Region	Certification	Certified units/sales
Australia (ARIA)	Platinum	70,000^{‡}
Brazil (Pro-Música Brasil)	Platinum	60,000^{‡}
Canada (Music Canada)	Platinum	80,000^{‡}
New Zealand (RMNZ)	Gold	15,000^{‡}
United Kingdom (BPI)	Silver	200,000^{‡}
United States (RIAA)	Platinum	1,000,000^{‡}
^{‡} Sales+streaming figures based on certification alone.

== Release history ==
Region	Date	Format	Label(s)	Ref
Worldwide	September 29, 2016	Digital download	XO; Republic	
