= Rockin' (song) =

Single by the Weeknd

from the album Starboy
- Released: May 9, 2017
- Recorded: 2016
- Studio: Conway Recording Studios, MXM (Los Angeles, California); MXM and Wolf Cousin Studios (Stockholm, Sweden)
- Genre: Electro-dance; 2-step garage
- Length: 3:52
- Label: XO; Republic
- Songwriters: Abel Tesfaye; Max Martin; Peter Svensson; Savan Kotecha; Ali Payami; Ahmad Balshe
- Producers: Ali Payami; Max Martin; The Weeknd (co.)

The Weeknd singles chronology
| "Lust for Life" (2017) | "Reminder" / "Rockin'" (2017) | "A Lie" (2017) |

Music video
- "Rockin'" on YouTube

"Rockin'" is a song by the Canadian singer-songwriter the Weeknd from his third studio album, Starboy (2016). The song was released to contemporary hit radio in France on May 9, 2017, as the album's sixth international single. The song was written by the Weeknd, Peter Svensson, Savan Kotecha, Belly, and producers Ali Payami and Max Martin, with the Weeknd serving as a co-producer.

== Music and composition ==
The song is performed in the key of A minor with a tempo of 113 beats per minute.

== Chart performance ==
"Rockin'" peaked at number 44 on the US Billboard Hot 100 despite never being released as a single in North America. The song also charted and peaked at number 25 on the Canadian Hot 100.

== Critical reception ==
The song received generally mixed-to-positive reviews from music critics. Mosi Reeves from Rolling Stone opined that the song "has an infectious garage-house rhythm courtesy of producers Max Martin and Ali Payami, but all The Weeknd can do is respond with a clunky chorus". Mike Pizzo, writing for the Las Vegas Weekly, described the song as being "2-step-fueled". Furthermore, Christopher Hooton from The Independent wrote that "Rockin'" is a "workout jam". Writing for Spin, Jordan Sargent said the song is "destined to be a single".

== Charts ==
| Chart (2016–2017) | Peak position |
|---|---|
| Belgium (Ultratip Bubbling Under Flanders) | 14 |
| Belgium (Ultratop 50 Wallonia) | 41 |
| Canada Hot 100 (Billboard) | 25 |
| Czech Republic Singles Digital (ČNS IFPI) | 18 |
| France (SNEP) | 176 |
| Germany (GfK) | 60 |
| Ireland (IRMA) | 28 |
| Italy (FIMI) | 46 |
| Netherlands (Single Top 100) | 25 |
| New Zealand Heatseekers (Recorded Music NZ) | 1 |
| Norway (VG-lista) | 24 |
| Portugal (AFP) | 31 |
| Slovakia Singles Digital (ČNS IFPI) | 11 |
| Spain (Promusicae) | 72 |
| Sweden (Sverigetopplistan) | 12 |
| UK Singles (OCC) | 26 |
| UK Hip Hop/R&B (OCC) | 4 |
| US Billboard Hot 100 | 44 |
| US Hot R&B/Hip-Hop Songs (Billboard) | 20 |

== Certifications ==
| Region | Certification | Certified units/sales |
|---|---|---|
| Canada (Music Canada) | Platinum | 80,000^{‡} |
| Italy (FIMI) | Gold | 25,000^{‡} |
| New Zealand (RMNZ) | Gold | 15,000^{‡} |
| United Kingdom (BPI) | Silver | 200,000^{‡} |
^{‡} Sales+streaming figures based on certification alone.

== Release history ==
| Region | Date | Format | Label(s) | Ref. |
|---|---|---|---|---|
| France | May 9, 2017 | Contemporary hit radio | XO; Republic | |
| Italy | May 26, 2017 | Contemporary hit radio | Universal | |
| United Kingdom | July 21, 2017 | Contemporary hit radio | XO; Republic | |
