= Starboy (album) =

2016 studio album by the Weeknd

Studio album by the Weeknd
- Released: November 25, 2016
- Recorded: 2016
- Studios: Conway; Henson; MXM; Westlake Beverly (Los Angeles); Downtown; Matza Ball (New York City); Gang (Paris); MXM; Wolf Cousins (Stockholm); The Treehouse X (Suffolk)
- Genres: R&B; pop; alternative R&B
- Length: 68:40
- Labels: XO; Republic
- Producers: Ali Payami; Ali Shaheed Muhammad; Ben Billions; Benny Blanco; Bobby Raps; Cashmere Cat; Cirkut; Daft Punk; Diplo; Doc McKinney; Frank Dukes; Jake One; Labrinth; Max Martin; Mano; Metro Boomin; Swish; the Weeknd

The Weeknd chronology
Beauty Behind the Madness (2015)	Starboy (2016)	My Dear Melancholy (2018)

Singles from Starboy
- 1. "Starboy" Released: September 21, 2016; 2. "False Alarm" Released: September 29, 2016; 3. "I Feel It Coming" Released: November 17, 2016; 4. "Party Monster" Released: November 17, 2016; 5. "Reminder" Released: May 9, 2017; 6. "Rockin'" Released: May 9, 2017; 7. "Die for You" Released: September 19, 2017; 8. "Secrets" Released: November 10, 2017

Starboy is the third studio album by the Canadian singer-songwriter the Weeknd, released on November 25, 2016, through XO and Republic Records. It features guest appearances from Daft Punk, Lana Del Rey, Kendrick Lamar, and Future. As the album's executive producers, the Weeknd and Doc McKinney enlisted a variety of producers such as Diplo, Cashmere Cat, Metro Boomin, Frank Dukes, and Labrinth, among others.

Starboy was supported by eight singles, including the US Billboard Hot 100 number-ones "Starboy" and "Die for You" (which topped the chart following a remix with Ariana Grande), and the top-five single "I Feel It Coming". It received generally favorable reviews from critics and debuted at number one on the US Billboard 200 with 348,000 album-equivalent units (209,000 of which were pure sales), becoming the Weeknd's second consecutive number-one album. It also debuted at number one on Billboard's Canadian Albums Chart. Starboy won Best Urban Contemporary Album at the 60th Annual Grammy Awards in 2018, marking the Weeknd's second win in that category. As of April 2022, the album is certified four-times platinum by the Recording Industry Association of America (RIAA). In 2023, the Weeknd released a deluxe version that contains three additional previously remixed releases: "Starboy" (Kygo remix), "Die For You" (with Ariana Grande), and "Reminder" (featuring ASAP Rocky and Young Thug).

== Background ==
After the commercial success of his previous album Beauty Behind the Madness (2015), the Weeknd hinted at the release of his third studio album on March 12, 2016, with an Instagram post calling it the next "chapter" to his music. He further revealed in an interview with Vogue that he had been working with the same team that helped produce his debut mixtape, House of Balloons (2011). On July 15, the executive vice president of Republic Records Wendy Goldstein confirmed during an interview with Billboard that the Weeknd would be collaborating with French electronic duo Daft Punk. On September 7, the Weeknd revealed during an interview with VMan that the album was in production and was influenced by Prince, the Smiths, Talking Heads and Bad Brains. He later revealed the album's overall theme and additional influences during his own interview with Billboard:

The vibe on Starboy comes from that hip-hop culture of braggadocio from Wu-Tang and 50 Cent, the kind of music I listened to as a kid. Bragging just sounds good, man. I was a teenager when I saw Scarface, and even though it was unbelievable, it's kind of cool Tony Montana could survive all those gunshots and not feel them.

The Weeknd formally announced his third studio album on September 21, by sharing its title and release date of November 25. The album title is an homage to David Bowie's 1972 song "Starman". The Weeknd said all tracks are "a thousand percent" inspired by Bowie and Prince. The album cover was photographed and designed by Nabil Elderkin, and its CD booklet features eleven portraits of the Weeknd shot by Elderkin. Work on the album finished in November 2016. The album's tracklist was formally revealed on November 17, 2016, alongside the release of the singles "I Feel It Coming" and "Party Monster". In an interview with Variety in 2020, the Weeknd said that the cross imagery on the album cover symbolizes being reborn.

== Composition ==
Primarily a R&B and pop album, Starboy incorporates elements of new wave, disco, dance-punk, electro-rock, electropop, electro-dance, 2-step, trap, and disco-house. Lyrical themes include celebrity extravagance, braggadocio, romance and materialism.

== Promotion ==
=== Singles ===
On September 21, 2016, the album's lead single, "Starboy", was released digitally on music stores and streaming services. The song features guest appearances from French electronic duo Daft Punk. The music video for the song premiered on September 28. The song peaked at number one on the US Billboard Hot 100.

"False Alarm" was released digitally as the album's second single on September 29, 2016. The song peaked at number 55 on the Billboard Hot 100.

"I Feel It Coming" was initially released as the album's joint third single, alongside "Party Monster" on November 17, 2016; it was later serviced to US rhythmic contemporary radio on December 6, 2016. The song peaked at number four on the Billboard Hot 100.

"Party Monster" was initially released as the album's fourth single, alongside "I Feel It Coming" on November 17, 2016; it was later serviced to urban contemporary radio on December 6, 2016. The song peaked at number 16 on the Billboard Hot 100.

"Reminder" was released to rhythmic contemporary radio on May 9, 2017, as the album's fifth single. The song peaked at number 31 on the Billboard Hot 100.

"Rockin'" was released to contemporary hit radio in France on May 9, 2017, as the album's sixth single. The song peaked at number 44 on the Billboard Hot 100.

"Die for You" was released to rhythmic contemporary radio on September 19, 2017, as the album's seventh single in the United States. The song peaked at number 43 on the Billboard Hot 100 during its original run and achieved a new peak of number six in January 2023. Following a remix with Ariana Grande, the song peaked at number one on the Billboard Hot 100 in March 2023. Directed by Christian Breslauer, the music video of "Die For You" was surprise-released in 2021, as part of the 5th anniversary of Starboy's release.

"Secrets" was released to radio in Italy on November 10, 2017, as the album's seventh and final international single. The song peaked at number 47 on the Billboard Hot 100.

=== Performances ===
The Weeknd was a musical guest on the season 42 season premiere of Saturday Night Live. He promoted the album by performing both "Starboy" and "False Alarm" and starred in a brief cameo on the "Weeknd Update" sketch, where he acknowledged his new haircut. On November 20, 2016, the Weeknd sang "Starboy" at the 2016 American Music Awards. Four days later, the Weeknd appeared on The Tonight Show Starring Jimmy Fallon to perform both "I Feel It Coming" and "Starboy". On December 6, he performed at the 2016 Victoria's Secret Fashion Show on CBS. On February 12, 2017, the Weeknd and Daft Punk performed at the 2017 Grammy Awards.

On November 25, 2016, all of the album's tracks played throughout the Weeknd's interview with Zane Lowe for Beats 1.

=== Short film ===
On November 23, 2016, the Weeknd released a 12-minute-long short film in promotion of the album, directed by Grant Singer, who also directed the "Starboy" music video. Named Mania, it features the songs such as "All I Know" featuring Future, "Sidewalks" featuring Kendrick Lamar, "Secrets", "Die for You", "Party Monster" and "I Feel It Coming" featuring Daft Punk. It stars French model Anais Mali as the female protagonist.

=== Tour ===
The Weeknd announced dates for the first leg of the Starboy: Legend of the Fall Tour in support of Starboy on October 31, 2016, which begun on February 17, 2017.

== Critical reception ==
Starboy ratings
Aggregate scores
Source	Rating
AnyDecentMusic?	6.4/10
Metacritic	67/100
Review scores
Source	Rating
AllMusic	3/5 stars
The A.V. Club	B
The Daily Telegraph	4/5 stars
Entertainment Weekly	B
The Guardian	3/5 stars
The Independent	3/5 stars
NME	3/5 stars
Pitchfork	6.7/10
Q	3/5 stars
Rolling Stone	3/5 stars

Starboy was met with generally favorable reviews. At Metacritic, which assigns a normalized rating out of 100 to reviews from professional publications, the album received an average score of 67, based on 25 reviews. Aggregator AnyDecentMusic? gave it 6.4 out of 10, based on their assessment of the critical consensus.

Annie Zaleski of The A.V. Club praised the album saying, "The record is a few songs too long, and it loses steam as it progresses. But such imperfections are par for the course: He'd rather express everything he's feeling than put forth an airbrushed or idealized version of himself. In that sense, Starboy is one of the most confident releases of the year, one bold enough to reveal the cracks in The Weeknd's façade for the sake of resonant art". Michael Madden of Consequence said, "It would help if more of the album were idiosyncratic that way, but as is, Starboy is still the sound of Tesfaye knowing he has what it takes to be a major figure in pop music for a very long time". Neil McCormick of The Daily Telegraph gave the album a positive review stating, "What is surprising is how seamless and integrated the sound is—a really luxurious, supple groove of sparkling electronica and sinuous, melodic vocals". Nolan Feeney of Entertainment Weekly wrote: "While musicians writing about coping with newfound celebrity is one of pop's oldest tropes, the Weeknd avoids the usual clichés with observations and anecdotes that feel specific and genuine." Ryan B. Patrick of Exclaim! saying "Those wishing for a return to the Trilogy days will have to bit a tad longer; across 18 tracks, the Weeknd proves he's ready for primetime here, but there's still a sense of feeling out the new parameters". Mehan Jayasuriya of Pitchfork said, "Starboy, by way of contrast [to Trilogy], feels more like an opportunistic compilation of B-sides than an album. Who is the Weeknd? At this point, even the man behind the curtain might not know".

In a mixed review, AllMusic's Andy Kellman stated: "The productions—the majority of which involve Doc McKinney and/or Cirkut, low-lighted by maneater dance-punk dud "False Alarm"—are roughly as variable in style as they are in quality. When pared down to its ten best songs, Starboy sounds like Tesfaye's most accomplished work." Alexis Petridis of The Guardian said, "There are things worth hearing on Starboy. It seems to capture an artist in a slightly awkward state of flux, unsure whether to cravenly embrace the kind of pop stardom that gets you on the shortlist for the Nickelodeon Kids' Choice awards or throw caution to the wind and do something more interesting artistically. Starboy hedges its bets and tries to do both. You can see why, but it makes for a curiously uneven album". In another mixed review, Rolling Stone's Mosi Reeves stated: "Despite an overlong hour-plus runtime and surplus of filler, Starboy does have highlights. ... But for longtime fans that believe the Weeknd is one of the major R&B artists of the decade, Starboy will ultimately seem like a disappointment."

=== Year-end lists ===
Select year-end rankings of Starboy
Publication	List	Rank	Ref.
Billboard	50 Best Albums of 2016	21	
Complex	The 50 Best Albums of 2016	40	
Digital Spy	20 Best Albums of 2016	5	
Noisey	The 100 Best Albums of 2016	84	
Variance	50 Best Albums of 2016	41	

=== Industry awards ===
Awards and nominations for Starboy
Year	Ceremony	Category	Result	Ref.
2017	American Music Awards	Favorite Pop/Rock Album	Nominated	
2017	American Music Awards	Favorite Soul/R&B Album	Nominated	
2017	Billboard Music Awards	Top Billboard 200 Album	Nominated	
2017	Billboard Music Awards	Top R&B Album	Nominated	
2017	Juno Awards	Album of the Year	Nominated	
2017	Juno Awards	R&B/Soul Recording of the Year	Won	
2017	Polaris Music Prize	Polaris Music Prize	Longlisted	
2017	Soul Train Music Awards	Album/Mixtape of the Year	Nominated	
2018	Grammy Awards	Best Urban Contemporary Album	Won	

== Commercial performance ==
In the United States, Starboy debuted at number one on the Billboard 200 with 348,000 album-equivalent units, calculated from 209,000 pure album sales and 175.2 million on-demand streams. It marked the Weeknd's second consecutive number-one album and the third-largest debut sales week of 2016. At the time, Starboy had the second-largest streaming week for an album ever behind Drake's Views. All 18 songs from the album charted on the Billboard Hot 100. It marked the second-best total simultaneous Hot 100 entries at the time, after Drake charted 20 songs at the same time in May 2016. Starboy was ranked as the third most successful album of 2017 on the Billboard 200. It was the fourth most-streamed album of 2017 on Spotify.

On December 5, 2024, Starboy was certified six-times platinum by the Recording Industry Association of America (RIAA) for combined sales and streams in excess of six million units in the United States.

== Track listing ==
Standard edition
No.	Title	Writer(s)	Producers	Length
1.	"Starboy" (featuring Daft Punk)	Abel Tesfaye; Thomas Bangalter; Guy-Manuel de Homem-Christo; Martin McKinney; Henry Russell Walter; Jason Quenneville	Daft Punk; Doc McKinney^{[a]}; Cirkut^{[a]}; The Weeknd^{[a]}	3:50
2.	"Party Monster"	Tesfaye; Benjamin Diehl; McKinney; Ahmad Balshe; Lana Del Rey	Ben Billions; Doc McKinney; The Weeknd	4:09
3.	"False Alarm"	Tesfaye; McKinney; Balshe; Diehl; Walter; Emmanuel Nickerson	Doc McKinney; The Weeknd; Cirkut^{[a]}; Mano^{[a]}	3:40
4.	"Reminder"	Tesfaye; Nickerson; McKinney; Dylan Wiggins; Walter; Quenneville	Doc McKinney; Mano; Cirkut	3:38
5.	"Rockin'"	Tesfaye; Max Martin; Peter Svensson; Savan Kotecha; Ali Payami; Balshe	Martin; Payami; The Weeknd^{[a]}	3:52
6.	"Secrets"	Tesfaye; McKinney; Walter; Wiggins; Roland Orzabal; Coz Canler; Jimmy Marinos; Wally Palamarchuk; Mike Skill; Peter Solley	Doc McKinney; The Weeknd; Cirkut	4:25
7.	"True Colors"	Tesfaye; William Thomas Walsh; Magnus Høiberg; Benjamin Levin; Brittany Hazzard; Samuel Wishkoski; Jacob Dutton	Benny Blanco; Cashmere Cat; The Weeknd; Jake One; Swish	3:26
8.	"Stargirl Interlude" (featuring Lana Del Rey)	Tesfaye; Del Rey; McKinney; Timothy McKenzie	Doc McKinney; Labrinth	1:51
9.	"Sidewalks" (featuring Kendrick Lamar)	Tesfaye; Kendrick Duckworth; McKinney; Daniel Wilson; Robert John Richardson; Ali Shaheed Jones-Muhummad	Doc McKinney; Bobby Raps; Ali Shaheed Muhammad	3:51
10.	"Six Feet Under"	Tesfaye; Nayvadius Wilburn; McKinney; Diehl; Leland Wayne; Walter; Balshe; Quenneville	Doc McKinney; Cirkut; Metro Boomin; Ben Billions; The Weeknd	3:57
11.	"Love to Lay"	Tesfaye; Martin; Svensson; Kotecha; Payami; Balshe	Martin; Payami; The Weeknd	3:43
12.	"A Lonely Night"	Tesfaye; Martin; Svensson; Kotecha; Payami; Balshe; Quenneville	Martin; Payami	3:40
13.	"Attention"	Tesfaye; Walsh; Levin; Høiberg; Adam Feeney; Mustafa Ahmed	Benny Blanco; Cashmere Cat; Frank Dukes; The Weeknd	3:17
14.	"Ordinary Life"	Tesfaye; Martin; Svensson; Kotecha; Payami; Balshe; McKinney; Walter	Doc McKinney; Cirkut	3:41
15.	"Nothing Without You"	Tesfaye; Quenneville; Diehl; Thomas Pentz; Balshe; Walter	Diplo; Ben Billions; The Weeknd; Cirkut	3:18
16.	"All I Know" (featuring Future)	Tesfaye; Wilburn; Diehl; Høiberg; Balshe	Ben Billions; Cashmere Cat; The Weeknd	5:21
17.	"Die for You"	Tesfaye; McKinney; Mejdi Rhars; Wiggins; Høiberg; Walsh; Walter	Doc McKinney; Cirkut; The Weeknd; Cashmere Cat^{[a]}; Prince 85^{[a]}	4:20
18.	"I Feel It Coming" (featuring Daft Punk)	Tesfaye; Bangalter; de Homem-Christo; McKinney; Walter; Eric Chedeville	Daft Punk; Doc McKinney^{[a]}; Cirkut^{[a]}; The Weeknd^{[a]}	4:29
Total length:				68:40

2023 deluxe edition
No.	Title	Writer(s)	Producers	Length
19.	"Die for You" (remix) (with Ariana Grande)	Tesfaye; McKinney; Rhars; Wiggins; Høiberg; Walsh; Walter; Grande	Doc McKinney; Cirkut; The Weeknd; Cashmere Cat^{[a]}; Prince 85^{[a]}	3:53
20.	"Starboy" (featuring Daft Punk) (Kygo remix)	Tesfaye; Bangalter; de Homem-Christo; McKinney; Walter; Quenneville	Daft Punk; Doc McKinney^{[a]}; Cirkut^{[a]}; The Weeknd^{[a]}; Kygo^{[b]}	4:04
21.	"Reminder" (Young Thug and ASAP Rocky remix)	Tesfaye; Jeffery Williams; Rakim Mayers; Nickerson; McKinney; Dylan Wiggins; Walter; Quenneville	Doc McKinney; Mano; Cirkut	3:42
Total length:				80:09

=== Notes ===
- ^{^[a]} signifies a co-producer
- ^{^[b]} signifies a remix producer
- "Party Monster" features background vocals by Lana Del Rey
- "Rockin'" features additional vocals by Kazue Lika Tatsushima
- "Sidewalks" features additional vocals by Daniel Wilson
- "Six Feet Under" features additional vocals by Future
- Kygo remix of "Starboy" featuring Daft Punk was initially available on the Japanese and US Target editions as a bonus track.

=== Sample credits ===
- "Secrets" contains a portion of "Pale Shelter", written by Roland Orzabal; and embodies a portion of "Talking in Your Sleep", written by Coz Canler, Jimmy Marinos, Wally Palamarchuk, Mike Skill and Peter Solley.

== Personnel ==
Adapted from the album's liner notes.

- Cory Bice – assistant engineer (tracks 5, 11–12, 14)
- Ben Billions – producer (tracks 2, 10, 15–16), engineer (tracks 2–3, 10, 15)
- Benny Blanco – producer (tracks 7, 13)
- Ryland Blackinton – guitar (track 12)
- Bobby Raps – producer (track 9)
- Cashmere Cat – producer (tracks 7, 13, 16), co-producer (track 17), additional vocals (track 13)
- Simon Christianson – additional guitar (tracks 3, 17)
- Cirkut – co-producer (tracks 1, 3, 18), engineer (tracks 1, 6, 14, 17–18), producer (tracks 4, 6, 10, 14–15, 17)
- Tom Coyne – mastering (all tracks)
- Lana Del Rey – backing vocals (track 2), featured artist (track 8)
- Frank Dukes – producer (track 13)
- Daft Punk – producers, featured artist (tracks 1, 18)
- Diplo – producer (track 15)
- Nathan East – bass (track 18)
- Adrian Eccleston – acoustic guitar (track 6)
- Robin Florent – assistant mix engineer (tracks 2, 4, 8–10, 15–16)
- Future – additional vocals (track 10), featured artist (track 16)
- Chris Galland – mix engineer (tracks 2, 4, 8–10, 15–16)
- Şerban Ghenea – mixing (tracks 1, 3, 5–7, 11–14, 17–18)
- John Hanes – mix engineer (tracks 1, 3, 5–7, 11–14, 17–18)
- Sam Holland – engineer (tracks 5, 11–12)
- Jeff Jackson – assistant mix engineer (tracks 2, 4, 8–10, 15–16)
- Paul Jackson Jr. – guitar (track 18)
- Labrinth – producer (track 8)
- Florian Lagatta – engineer (tracks 1, 18)
- Kendrick Lamar – featured artist (track 9)
- Jeremy Lertola – assistant engineer (tracks 5, 11–12, 14); handclaps (track 11)
- Mano – co-producer (track 3), producer (track 4)
- Manny Marroquin – mixing (tracks 2, 4, 8–10, 15–16)
- Max Martin – producer (tracks 5, 11–12); guitar (track 11)
- Doc McKinney – executive producer, co-producer (tracks 1, 18), engineer (tracks 1–4, 6, 8–10, 14, 16–18), producer (tracks 2–4, 6, 8–10, 14, 17)
- Aya Merrill – mastering (all tracks)
- Raphael Mesquita – engineer (track 15)
- Metro Boomin – producer (track 10)
- Ali Shaheed Muhammad – producer (track 9)
- Jake One – producer (track 7)
- Noah "Mailbox" Passovoy – engineer (track 12)
- Ali Payami – producer (tracks 5, 11–12)
- Prince 85 – co-producer (track 17)
- JR Robinson – drums (track 18)
- David Schwerkolt – engineer (tracks 7, 13)
- Josh Smith – engineer (tracks 1–4, 6, 8–10, 15–18)
- Peter Svensson – guitar (track 11)
- Swish – producer (track 7)
- Kazue Lika Tatsushima – additional vocals (track 5)
- The Weeknd – executive producer, co-producer (tracks 1, 5, 18), producer (tracks 2–3, 6–7, 10–11, 13, 15–17)
- Dylan Wiggins – keyboards (tracks 4, 6); bass (tracks 4, 18); drums (track 5); synth bass (track 17)
- Daniel Wilson – additional vocals, additional producer (track 9)

== Charts ==
=== Weekly charts ===
Chart performance
Chart (2016–2024)	Peak position
Australian Albums (ARIA)	1
Austrian Albums (Ö3 Austria)	10
Belgian Albums (Ultratop Flanders)	7
Belgian Albums (Ultratop Wallonia)	24
Canadian Albums (Billboard)	1
Croatian International Albums (HDU)	22
Czech Albums (ČNS IFPI)	4
Danish Albums (Hitlisten)	1
Dutch Albums (Album Top 100)	3
Finnish Albums (Suomen virallinen lista)	1
French Albums (SNEP)	14
German Albums (Offizielle Top 100)	10
Greek Albums (IFPI)	8
Hungarian Albums (MAHASZ)	18
Irish Albums (IRMA)	3
Italian Albums (FIMI)	32
Japanese Hot Albums (Billboard Japan)	43
Japanese Albums (Oricon)	49
Latvian Albums (LaIPA)	52
Mexican Albums (AMPROFON)	16
New Zealand Albums (RMNZ)	5
Norwegian Albums (VG-lista)	1
Polish Albums (ZPAV)	19
Portuguese Albums (AFP)	13
Scottish Albums (Official Charts)	18
Slovak Albums (ČNS IFPI)	1
South Korean Albums (Circle)	36
South Korean International Albums (Circle)	3
Spanish Albums (Promusicae)	39
Swedish Albums (Sverigetopplistan)	1
Swiss Albums (Schweizer Hitparade)	5
Taiwanese International Albums (Five Music)	2
UK Albums (Official Charts)	5
UK R&B Albums (Official Charts)	1
US Billboard 200	1
US Top R&B/Hip-Hop Albums (Billboard)	1

=== Year-end charts ===
Year-end chart performance
Chart (2016)	Position
Australian Albums (ARIA)	51
Australian Urban Albums (ARIA)	9
Belgian Albums (Ultratop Flanders)	107
Danish Albums (Hitlisten)	36
Dutch Albums (Album Top 100)	48
French Albums (SNEP)	97
Icelandic Albums (Tónlistinn)	30
South Korean International Albums (Circle)	72
Swedish Albums (Sverigetopplistan)	44
UK Albums (OCC)	52

Year-end chart performance
Chart (2017)	Position
Australian Albums (ARIA)	27
Australian Urban Albums (ARIA)	4
Belgian Albums (Ultratop Flanders)	47
Belgian Albums (Ultratop Wallonia)	128
Canadian Albums (Billboard)	2
Danish Albums (Hitlisten)	3
Dutch Albums (Album Top 100)	28
French Albums (SNEP)	40
Icelandic Albums (Tónlistinn)	19
Italian Albums (FIMI)	62
Mexican Albums (AMPROFON)	67
New Zealand Albums (RMNZ)	14
South Korean International Albums (Circle)	45
Swedish Albums (Sverigetopplistan)	5
Swiss Albums (Schweizer Hitparade)	76
UK Albums (OCC)	26
US Billboard 200	3
US Top R&B/Hip-Hop Albums (Billboard)	4

Year-end chart performance
Chart (2018)	Position
Australian Albums (ARIA)	91
Australian Hip Hop/R&B Albums (ARIA)	29
Canadian Albums (Billboard)	28
Danish Albums (Hitlisten)	36
Icelandic Albums (Tónlistinn)	71
South Korean International Albums (Circle)	97
Swedish Albums (Sverigetopplistan)	58
US Billboard 200	49
US Top R&B/Hip-Hop Albums (Billboard)	28

Year-end chart performance
Chart (2019)	Position
Australian Hip Hop/R&B Albums (ARIA)	32
Belgian Albums (Ultratop Flanders)	192
Danish Albums (Hitlisten)	65
US Billboard 200	98

Year-end chart performance
Chart (2020)	Position
Australian Hip Hop/R&B Albums (ARIA)	26
Belgian Albums (Ultratop Flanders)	103
Danish Albums (Hitlisten)	53
Icelandic Albums (Tónlistinn)	91
Swedish Albums (Sverigetopplistan)	98
US Billboard 200	95
US Top R&B/Hip-Hop Albums (Billboard)	84

Year-end chart performance
Chart (2021)	Position
Australian Albums (ARIA)	99
Australian Hip Hop/R&B Albums (ARIA)	31
Belgian Albums (Ultratop Flanders)	143
Danish Albums (Hitlisten)	53
US Billboard 200	162
US Top R&B/Hip-Hop Albums (Billboard)	81

Year-end chart performance
Chart (2022)	Position
Australian Albums (ARIA)	29
Australian Hip Hop/R&B Albums (ARIA)	6
Belgian Albums (Ultratop Flanders)	63
Belgian Albums (Ultratop Wallonia)	115
Danish Albums (Hitlisten)	38
Dutch Albums (Album Top 100)	28
Icelandic Albums (Tónlistinn)	40
Lithuanian Albums (AGATA)	27
Swedish Albums (Sverigetopplistan)	66
UK Albums (OCC)	78
US Billboard 200	141
US Top R&B/Hip-Hop Albums (Billboard)	49

Year-end chart performance
Chart (2023)	Position
Australian Albums (ARIA)	10
Australian Hip Hop/R&B Albums (ARIA)	2
Austrian Albums (Ö3 Austria)	23
Belgian Albums (Ultratop Flanders)	29
Belgian Albums (Ultratop Wallonia)	33
Danish Albums (Hitlisten)	16
Dutch Albums (Album Top 100)	10
German Albums (Offizielle Top 100)	34
Hungarian Albums (MAHASZ)	28
Icelandic Albums (Tónlistinn)	17
Italian Albums (FIMI)	69
Polish Albums (ZPAV)	54
Swedish Albums (Sverigetopplistan)	13
Swiss Albums (Schweizer Hitparade)	19
UK Albums (OCC)	32
US Billboard 200	23
US Top R&B/Hip-Hop Albums (Billboard)	10

Year-end chart performance
Chart (2024)	Position
Australian Albums (ARIA)	25
Australian Hip Hop/R&B Albums (ARIA)	5
Belgian Albums (Ultratop Flanders)	49
Belgian Albums (Ultratop Wallonia)	39
Danish Albums (Hitlisten)	44
Dutch Albums (Album Top 100)	32
German Albums (Offizielle Top 100)	57
Hungarian Albums (MAHASZ)	37
Icelandic Albums (Tónlistinn)	77
Swedish Albums (Sverigetopplistan)	44
Swiss Albums (Schweizer Hitparade)	25
UK Albums (OCC)	74
US Billboard 200	54
US Top R&B/Hip-Hop Albums (Billboard)	17

Year-end chart performance
Chart (2025)	Position
Australian Albums (ARIA)	67
Belgian Albums (Ultratop Flanders)	82
Belgian Albums (Ultratop Wallonia)	96
Dutch Albums (Album Top 100)	70
Hungarian Albums (MAHASZ)	61
Swedish Albums (Sverigetopplistan)	81
Swiss Albums (Schweizer Hitparade)	44
US Billboard 200	73
US Top R&B/Hip-Hop Albums (Billboard)	22

=== Decade-end charts ===
Decade-end chart performance
Chart (2010–2019)	Position
US Billboard 200	39

== Certifications ==
Certifications
Region	Certification	Certified units/sales
Australia (ARIA)	3× Platinum	210,000^{‡}
Austria (IFPI Austria)	Platinum	15,000^{*}
Belgium (BRMA)	Platinum	30,000^{‡}
Brazil (Pro-Música Brasil)	Diamond	160,000^{‡}
Brazil (Pro-Música Brasil) Deluxe	3× Diamond	480,000^{‡}
Canada (Music Canada)	7× Platinum	560,000^{‡}
Denmark (IFPI Danmark)	8× Platinum	160,000^{‡}
France (SNEP)	3× Platinum	300,000^{‡}
Germany (BVMI)	Platinum	200,000^{‡}
Iceland (FHF)	Gold	3,500
Italy (FIMI)	2× Platinum	100,000^{‡}
Mexico (AMPROFON)	Platinum+Gold	90,000^{‡}
New Zealand (RMNZ)	6× Platinum	90,000^{‡}
Norway (IFPI Norway)	Platinum	30,000^{‡}
Poland (ZPAV)	Diamond	100,000^{‡}
Portugal (AFP)	Gold	7,500^{^}
Singapore (RIAS)	Platinum	10,000^{*}
Sweden (GLF)	2× Platinum	80,000^{‡}
United Kingdom (BPI)	3× Platinum	900,000^{‡}
United States (RIAA)	6× Platinum	6,000,000^{‡}
^{*} Sales figures based on certification alone.^{^} Shipments figures based on certification alone.^{‡} Sales+streaming figures based on certification alone.

== Release history ==
Release dates and formats
Region	Date	Label(s)	Format(s)	Edition	Ref.
Various	November 25, 2016	XO; Republic	Digital download; streaming	Standard	
United States	November 28, 2016	XO; Republic	CD	Standard	
Brazil	December 16, 2016	Universal	CD	Standard	
United States	March 10, 2023	XO; Republic	Digital download	Deluxe	
Various	March 14, 2023	XO; Republic	Digital download; streaming	Deluxe	
Europe	September 29, 2023	XO; Republic	CD	Deluxe	
United States	October 9, 2023	XO; Republic	CD	Deluxe	
