= Secrets (The Weeknd song) =

Single by the Weeknd

from the album Starboy
- Released: November 10, 2017
- Studio: Conway Recording Studios
- Genre: New wave; synth-pop; disco-house
- Length: 4:26
- Label: XO; Republic
- Songwriters: Abel Tesfaye; Martin McKinney; Henry Walter; Dylan Wiggins; Roland Orzabal; Coz Canler; Jimmy Marinos; Wally Palamarchuk; Mike Skill; Peter Solley
- Producers: Doc McKinney; Tesfaye; Cirkut

The Weeknd singles chronology
"Die for You" (2017)	"Secrets" (2017)	"Pray for Me" (2018)

Music video
- "Secrets" on YouTube

"Secrets" is a song by the Canadian singer-songwriter the Weeknd from his third studio album Starboy (2016). The song was written and produced by the Weeknd, Martin "Doc" McKinney, and Henry "Cirkut" Walter, with Dylan Wiggins, Roland Orzabal, Coz Canler, Jimmy Marinos, Wally Palamarchuk, Mike Skill, and Peter Solley receiving writing credits for the sampling of the new wave songs "Pale Shelter" by Tears for Fears and "Talking in Your Sleep" by the Romantics. "Secrets" was released to radio in Italy on November 10, 2017, as the album's final international single.

== Chart performance ==
"Secrets" peaked at number 47 on the US Billboard Hot 100. It also peaked at number 27 on the Canadian Hot 100.

== Music video ==
The music video for "Secrets" was directed by Pedro Martin-Calero and was filmed in Toronto. It was mainly filmed at the brutalist Andrews Building at the University of Toronto Scarborough and the Toronto Reference Library. It was released on June 11, 2017, and features singer Black Atlass.

== Charts ==
=== Weekly charts ===
Chart (2016–2017)	Peak position
Argentina (Monitor Latino)	15
Canada Hot 100 (Billboard)	27
Czech Republic Singles Digital (ČNS IFPI)	41
France (SNEP)	114
Ireland (IRMA)	58
Netherlands (Single Top 100)	55
Portugal (AFP)	55
Slovakia Singles Digital (ČNS IFPI)	19
Sweden (Sverigetopplistan)	77
UK Singles (Official Charts)	47
UK Hip Hop/R&B (Official Charts)	10
Uruguay (Monitor Latino)	15
US Billboard Hot 100	47
US Hot R&B/Hip-Hop Songs (Billboard)	22

=== Year-end charts ===
Chart (2017)	Position
Argentina (Monitor Latino)	54

Chart (2018)	Position
Argentina (Monitor Latino)	73

== Certifications ==
Region	Certification	Certified units/sales
Brazil (Pro-Música Brasil)	Platinum	60,000^{‡}
Canada (Music Canada)	Platinum	80,000^{‡}
France (SNEP)	Gold	100,000^{‡}
New Zealand (RMNZ)	Gold	15,000^{‡}
United Kingdom (BPI)	Silver	200,000^{‡}
United States (RIAA)	Platinum	1,000,000^{‡}
^{‡} Sales+streaming figures based on certification alone.

== Release history ==
Region	Date	Format	Label(s)	Ref.
Italy	November 10, 2017	Contemporary hit radio	Universal	
