= Sidewalks (The Weeknd song) =

Song by the Weeknd featuring Kendrick Lamar

from the album Starboy
- Released: November 25, 2016
- Studio: Conway
- Genre: Arena rock; R&B
- Length: 3:51
- Label: XO; Republic
- Songwriters: Abel Tesfaye; Kendrick Duckworth; Martin McKinney; Daniel Wilson; Robert John Richardson; Ali Shaheed Jones-Muhummad
- Producers: Doc McKinney; Bobby Raps; Ali Shaheed Muhammad

"Sidewalks" is a song by Canadian singer-songwriter the Weeknd, featuring American rapper Kendrick Lamar, from his third studio album Starboy (2016). The song was written by both artists alongside Doc McKinney, Daniel Wilson, Robert John Richardson, and Ali Shaheed Muhammad, being produced by McKinney, Bobby Raps and Muhammad. The song sampled the song "Fu-Gee-La" by Fugees.

It was one of the tracks off Starboy to be featured in the short film Mania. The song features additional vocals by Daniel Wilson and is the first collaboration between the Weeknd and Lamar. The song was commercially successful, reaching the Top 30 in the United States and the United Kingdom. The song is certified Platinum by Recording Industry Association of America.

== Commercial performance ==
Like the rest of the tracks from Starboy, "Sidewalks'" charted on the Billboard Hot 100, reaching number 27. It reached the top five on the R&B Songs chart and the Top 20 on the Hot R&B/Hip-Hop Songs chart. The song also charted and peaked at number 14 on the Canadian Hot 100, reaching the Top 20.

== Charts ==
=== Weekly charts ===
Chart (2016–2017)	Peak position
Austria (Ö3 Austria Top 40)	67
Canada Hot 100 (Billboard)	14
Czech Republic Singles Digital (ČNS IFPI)	18
France (SNEP)	143
Germany (GfK)	89
Ireland (IRMA)	46
Netherlands (Single Top 100)	47
New Zealand Heatseekers (Recorded Music NZ)	2
Portugal (AFP)	30
Sweden (Sverigetopplistan)	41
UK Singles (Official Charts)	30
UK Hip Hop/R&B (Official Charts)	6
US Billboard Hot 100	27
US Hot R&B/Hip-Hop Songs (Billboard)	12

=== Year-end charts ===
Chart (2017)	Position
US Hot R&B Songs (Billboard)	43

== Certifications ==
Region	Certification	Certified units/sales
Brazil (Pro-Música Brasil)	Gold	30,000^{‡}
Canada (Music Canada)	3× Platinum	240,000^{‡}
Denmark (IFPI Danmark)	Gold	45,000^{‡}
New Zealand (RMNZ)	Platinum	30,000^{‡}
Portugal (AFP)	Gold	5,000^{‡}
United Kingdom (BPI)	Silver	200,000^{‡}
United States (RIAA)	Platinum	1,000,000^{‡}
^{‡} Sales+streaming figures based on certification alone.
