= Reminder (song) =

Single by the Weeknd

from the album Starboy
- Released: May 9, 2017
- Recorded: 2016
- Studio: Conway Recording Studios
- Genre: R&B; trap
- Length: 3:40 (album version); 3:43 (remix)
- Label: XO; Republic
- Songwriters: Abel Tesfaye; Emmanuel Nickerson; Martin McKinney; Dylan Wiggins; Henry Walter; Jason Quenneville
- Producers: Doc McKinney; Mano; Cirkut

The Weeknd singles chronology
"Lust for Life" (2017)	"Reminder" / "Rockin'" (2017)	"A Lie" (2017)

Music video
- "Reminder" on YouTube

"Reminder" (remix)
- Remix cover art

"Reminder" is a song by Canadian singer-songwriter the Weeknd from his third studio album, Starboy (2016). It was written by him with Dylan Wiggins, DaHeala, and its producers Doc McKinney, Mano and Cirkut. The song was released to rhythmic contemporary radio on May 9, 2017, as the album's fifth single in the United States.

The official remix was released on August 1, 2017, and features new verses from American rappers ASAP Rocky and Young Thug. It was later included on the deluxe version of Starboy, released on March 14, 2023.

== Commercial performance ==
"Reminder" peaked at number 31 on the US Billboard Hot 100. It reached the top ten on both the R&B Songs chart and Hot R&B/Hip-Hop Songs chart. The song also charted and peaked at number 16 on the Canadian Hot 100, reaching the top 20. The single was certified 3× Platinum by the Recording Industry Association of America (RIAA) for combined sales and streaming equivalent units of over three million units in the United States. In 2023, the song saw an increase in consumption as it went viral on the social media platform TikTok, which led to the song charting at 109 on the Billboard Global 200.

== Music video ==
The music video for "Reminder", directed by Kid Studio, premiered via the Weeknd's Vevo channel on February 16, 2017. It features cameo appearances from Drake, ASAP Rocky, Travis Scott, Bryson Tiller, YG, French Montana, Metro Boomin, Belly, Nav, Derek Wise, and the Weeknd's co-manager Amir "Cash" Esmailian. As of October 13, 2024, the video has accumulated 554 million views on Youtube. The video received four nominations at the 2017 MTV Video Music Awards; Video of the Year, Best Direction, Best Art Direction and Best Editing.

== Remix ==
The A$AP Rocky and Young Thug remix of the song featuring their new verses, was released on August 1, 2017, five days after its announcement, where singer the Weeknd posted two Instagram videos previewing both of their verses. Ryan Reed of Rolling Stone wrote, "A$AP Rocky's winding verse touches on marijuana and Jaden Smith ('Just like Jaden Smith, I'll probably walk around a day with it.') and referenced the Weeknd's Abel Tesfaye ('No way you think if I ever decide to cut my hair like Abel') strolling around with his recently clipped dreadlocks at the 2017 Met Gala," and noted, "In his Auto-Tuned verse, Young Thug moves from referencing his humble beginnings ('I used to pray to hear my songs on the radio') to a series of financial and sexual boasts". It was later included on the deluxe version of the album, released on March 14, 2023.

== Track listing ==
Digital download
No.	Title	Length
1.	"Reminder" (album version)	3:51

Digital download – Remix
No.	Title	Length
1.	"Reminder" (Remix) (featuring Young Thug & A$AP Rocky)	3:41

== Charts ==
=== Weekly charts ===
Chart (2016–2023)	Peak position
Canada Hot 100 (Billboard)	16
Canada CHR/Top 40 (Billboard)	6
Canada Hot AC (Billboard)	39
Czech Republic Singles Digital (ČNS IFPI)	59
France (SNEP)	73
Germany (GfK)	93
Global 200 (Billboard)	109
Greece International (IFPI)	34
Ireland (IRMA)	66
Malaysia International (RIM)	16
Netherlands (Single Top 100)	60
New Zealand Heatseekers (RMNZ)	2
Philippines (Billboard)	6
Portugal (AFP)	49
Singapore (RIAS)	30
Slovakia Singles Digital (ČNS IFPI)	28
Sweden (Sverigetopplistan)	76
Switzerland (Schweizer Hitparade)	86
UK Singles (OCC)	39
UK Hip Hop/R&B (OCC)	8
US Billboard Hot 100	31
US Hot R&B/Hip-Hop Songs (Billboard)	7
US R&B/Hip-Hop Airplay (Billboard)	31
US Rhythmic Airplay (Billboard)	8
US Anglo (Monitor Latino)	12
Vietnam (Vietnam Hot 100)	88

=== Year-end charts ===
Chart (2017)	Position
US Hot R&B/Hip-Hop Songs (Billboard)	71
US Rhythmic (Billboard)	47

== Certifications ==
Region	Certification	Certified units/sales
Austria (IFPI Austria)	Gold	15,000^{‡}
Brazil (Pro-Música Brasil)	Platinum	60,000^{‡}
Canada (Music Canada)	3× Platinum	240,000^{‡}
Denmark (IFPI Danmark)	Platinum	90,000^{‡}
France (SNEP)	Platinum	200,000^{‡}
Germany (BVMI)	Gold	200,000^{‡}
Italy (FIMI)	Gold	50,000^{‡}
New Zealand (RMNZ)	2× Platinum	60,000^{‡}
Poland (ZPAV)	Platinum	50,000^{‡}
Portugal (AFP)	Platinum	10,000^{‡}
Spain (Promusicae)	Gold	30,000^{‡}
United Kingdom (BPI)	Platinum	600,000^{‡}
United States (RIAA)	3× Platinum	3,000,000^{‡}
Streaming
Greece (IFPI Greece)	Platinum	2,000,000^{†}
^{‡} Sales+streaming figures based on certification alone.^{†} Streaming-only figures based on certification alone.

== Release history ==
Region	Date	Format	Version	Label	Ref.
United States	May 9, 2017	Rhythmic contemporary	Original	XO; Republic	
United States	August 1, 2017	Digital download	Remix	XO; Republic	
