= Starboy (song) =

2016 single by the Weeknd featuring Daft Punk

Single by the Weeknd featuring Daft Punk

from the album Starboy
- Released: September 23, 2016
- Recorded: July 2016
- Studio: Conway, Hollywood, California; Gang (Paris, France)
- Genre: R&B; electropop; hip-hop
- Length: 3:50
- Label: XO; Republic
- Songwriters: Abel Tesfaye; Thomas Bangalter; Guy-Manuel de Homem-Christo; Jason Quenneville; Martin McKinney; Henry Walter
- Producer: Daft Punk

The Weeknd singles chronology
"Wild Love" (2016)	"Starboy" (2016)	"False Alarm" (2016)

Daft Punk singles chronology
"Give Life Back to Music" (2014)	"Starboy" (2016)	"I Feel It Coming" (2016)

Music video
- "Starboy" on YouTube

"Starboy" is a song by the Canadian singer the Weeknd featuring the French electronic duo Daft Punk. It was released on September 23, 2016, through XO and Republic Records, as the lead single from his third studio album of the same name (2016). The artists wrote and produced the song with Doc McKinney and Henry "Cirkut" Walter, with Jason "DaHeala" Quenneville receiving additional credits. The song reflects themes of extravagance and celebrity life.

"Starboy" topped the charts in countries such as Canada, France, Netherlands, New Zealand and Sweden, as well as the US Billboard Hot 100, where it became the Weeknd's third chart-topper, and Daft Punk's only chart-topper. The music video for the song was directed by frequent collaborator Grant Singer, who directed the Weeknd's previous music videos for his previous chart-toppers "Can't Feel My Face" and "The Hills". In the music video, the Weeknd is shown trying to destroy evidence of his previous self, including his own awards from his past album, Beauty Behind the Madness. The video has been described as the Weeknd's attempt to evolve by murdering his former personality.

On November 11, 2016, a remix produced by Kygo was released, which was later included on the deluxe version of the album, released in March 2023.

== Background and release ==
In March 2016, the Weeknd hinted at an upcoming project, stating that a "chapter" was done, referring to his second studio album, Beauty Behind the Madness (2015). He started to record new material in May 2016, inviting Mark Guiducci of Vogue to Conway Recording Studios, revealing the involvement of the same team who produced his debut mixtape, House of Balloons (2011). The executive vice president for Republic Records revealed on July 15 that the Weeknd and the French electronic duo Daft Punk were set to have a session two days from then.

The Weeknd teased a collaboration with the duo in August 2016, posting an image of two robot figurines atop a speaker. On September 20, the Weeknd blanked his Instagram page, after posting multiple cryptic tweets. On September 21, he announced Starboy, his third studio album. A few hours later, he released the title track, featuring Daft Punk, as the album's lead single.

== Development and composition ==
Before recording together, the Weeknd wanted to get closer to Daft Punk for a long time, having first met one half of the duo, Guy-Manuel de Homem-Christo, at a Los Angeles party. He told Variety's Jem Aswad:

I just wanted to get into the studio with them — I didn't even care if we made music, I just wanted to be friends. I met Guy-Man first, out partying in L.A., and I actually partied with him more than I worked with him. He'd would (sic) tell me, with loud music playing over drinks, how much he liked my work.

At a Paris recording studio, the Weeknd was presented with one of the duo's draft instrumentals, which became "I Feel It Coming". Between takes, he repeatedly heard a drum loop, later finding out that it was the drum beat for "Starboy" on Homem-Christo's phone. The song was written in 30 minutes, and was finished with "I Feel It Coming" in a span of 4 days.

"Starboy" was written by the Weeknd, Thomas Bangalter, Homem-Christo, Doc McKinney, Cirkut, and DaHeala. It was produced by Daft Punk. The track was recorded at Gang Studio in Paris, France, and Conway Recording Studios in Los Angeles, California, and engineered by Florian Lagatta, McKinney, Cirkut, and Josh Smith. It was mixed at MixStar Studios in Virginia Beach by Serban Ghenea, with John Hanes serving as mixing engineer. The track was mastered by Tom Coyne and Aya Merrill at Sterling Sound, New York City. The sheet music for "Starboy", shows a composition of A minor at a tempo of 94 beats per minute, while the vocals range from A4-A5.

== Critical reception ==
The song received critical acclaim. Mehan Jayasuriya of Pitchfork said that the song "glides like a sleek, high-performance car". Christopher Bohlsen of Renowned for Sound said, "Melding The Weeknd's dark R&B with Daft Punk's nu-disco sound, the track elegantly rides the fine line between dance and hip-hop, the two genres Starboy oscillates between." Christopher Hooton of The Independent wrote, "A statement of intent and the record-breaking first single off the LP. There are no hi-hats to be found but instead an undulating, 80s-inspired pattern of popping drums over the smash-clap of a snare. It's pop-y but with an edge to it. Driving music, a car stalking through LA, the tyres slurring over the asphalt."

Billboard ranked "Starboy" at number four on their "100 Best Pop Songs of 2016" list: "Centric pop with frayed edges has been the M.O. for The Weeknd ever since he first signed on to the Fifty Shades of Grey soundtrack, and "Starboy" proves the culmination and likely end of that formula. With Daft Punk in tow to provide sighing background vocals and occasionally drift the song's production dangerously close to out of frame, the spellbinding night-drive assumes Abel Tesfaye's new alternate identity with the confidence of a star big enough to dictate his own nicknames: Even the opening lines ("I'm tryna put you in the worst mood, ah / P1 cleaner than your church shoes, ah") barely bother setting the scene, since you remember where the movie last left off. "Starboy" might not have been titled to serve as a Ziggy Stardust tribute, but it reflects how, like Bowie, Tesfaye understands the importance of constant evolution in both his music and his image." Yardbarker named it as one of the best songs of 2016: "It's catchy, and The Weeknd's unique singing style matches perfectly with Daft Punk's house-music-tinged beats."

== Commercial performance ==
The song reached number one in Canada, Denmark, France, New Zealand, Norway, Mexico, Sweden, and the United States, while also going top five in various countries, including reaching number two in both Australia and Ireland and number three in Germany. The single debuted at number 40 on the Billboard Hot 100, opening at number 22 on the Digital Songs chart with 28,000 downloads with only one day of charting and at number 37 on the Radio Songs chart with 36 million of audience, following its first full week of airplay. It became the Weeknd's third highest debut on the chart and Daft Punk's second top 40 entry. The following week, "Starboy" jumped 37 positions to reach number three, becoming the Weeknd's fifth top 10 single and Daft Punk's second. Additionally, "Starboy" made the biggest jump into the Hot 100's top five since Taylor Swift's "Bad Blood" leapt from number 53 to number one in June 2015. It sold 88,000 copies in its second week, and 92,000 in its third week.

After remaining in the number two spot for eight non-consecutive weeks on the Billboard Hot 100—behind The Chainsmokers' "Closer" for five weeks and Rae Sremmurd's "Black Beatles" for an additional three weeks—"Starboy" reached the top of the chart on the week of January 7, 2017, becoming The Weeknd's third and Daft Punk's first number one on the Hot 100. "Starboy" additionally topped the US Hot R&B/Hip-Hop Songs chart, where it became the Weeknd's fourth number one single and Daft Punk's first. On April 5, 2022, the song was certified 11× Platinum by the RIAA, denoting sales of 11 million units.

In New Zealand, the single debuted at number five, which was followed by two consecutive weeks at number 2 before moving to number one on the chart for the week of October 24, 2016. This marks the Weeknd's second number one single, as well as Daft Punk's first number one single in the country. In the UK, the single entered at number 3 for the week of October 6, 2016. The following week, it climbed up to number 2, held off by James Arthur's "Say You Won't Let Go". The next week, it was pushed to number 3 by "Closer" by The Chainsmokers before spending four weeks at number 4. Three weeks later, it flew from number 8 to number 3, due to the release of the album. That week, it also managed to reach a new peak of number 2 on the UK Streaming Chart (originally it had only peaked at number 3). It spent two weeks at number 3 before falling again, ultimately spending 15 consecutive weeks in the top ten.

Alongside with United States, the song was certified diamond in Brazil, Canada, France, Greece and Poland, becoming his first in France and Poland, and second in Brazil, Greece and Canada.

== Music video ==
=== Background and development ===
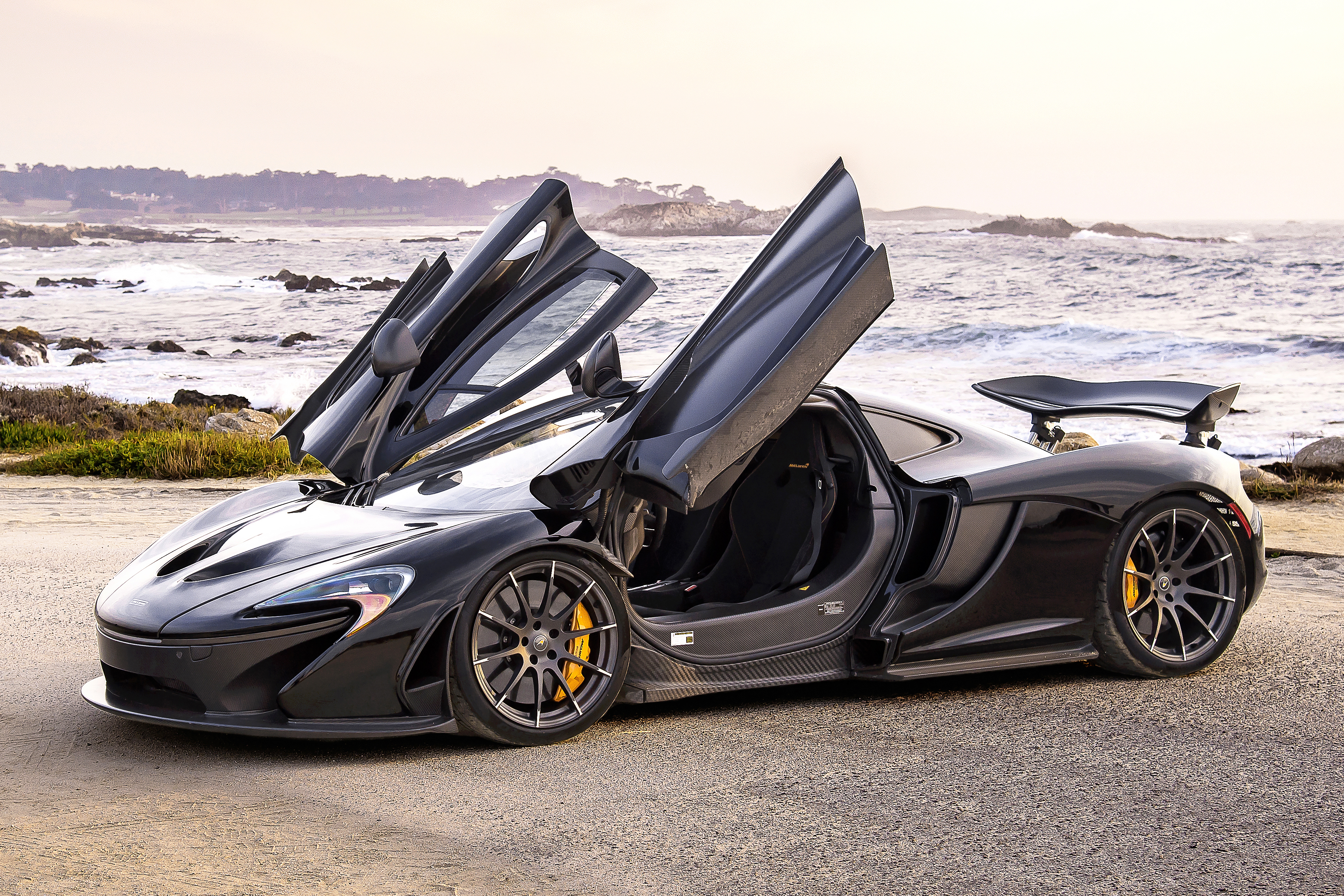
The song and video feature the Weeknd's personal McLaren P1, which he drives at the end of the video.

The music video for the song was directed by frequent collaborator Grant Singer, who directed the Weeknd's previous music videos for "Can't Feel My Face" and "The Hills". It was released through the singer's official Vevo account on September 28, 2016, on YouTube, along with an accompanying poster which Rolling Stone described as "pulp-horror-inspired". The video has been described as the singer's attempt to kill his former/old persona, perhaps signaling he is reinventing himself with this new album, by suffocating himself, clipping his old hairstyle, and crushing his glass-framed platinum records.

Several cars owned by the Weeknd are mentioned in the song's lyrics and featured in the video, consisting of the McLaren P1 in the first verse: "I'm trying to put you in the worst Mood ahh/ P1 cleaner than your church shoes ahh", followed by the Lamborghini Aventador SV Roadster which he sings in his second verse: "Pull off in that Roadster SV ahh/ Pockets overweight, getting hefty ahh," and finally a Bentley Mulsanne in the same verse right after: "The competition, I don't wanna listen/ I'm in the blue Mulsanne bumping New Edition. Billboard approached John Paolo Canton, McLaren Automotive's director of public relations, in order to find out the owner of the car, as their website stated "Even the world's biggest carmaker couldn't afford product placement like this, let alone a boutique British brand". Canton later confirmed that the car did belong to the Weeknd.

In 3 weeks, the video had 100 million views. The video had 500 million views in 3 months. As of September 2025, the video has over 2.6 billion views on YouTube, making it among the top seventy most viewed YouTube videos.

=== Synopsis ===
In the video, a man in a black ski mask and diamond-encrusted cross is sitting across from the Weeknd, who is zip tied to the chair. The figure then kills the Weeknd by asphyxiating him with a plastic bag. The figure is revealed to be the Starboy incarnation of the Weeknd—his other self represented his Beauty Behind the Madness era. He then walks through a house full of awards that he's received, as well as a portrait of Daft Punk, who collaborated on the song, and a panther. He comes upon a large glowing pink neon cross, which he grabs and uses to destroy various evidence and history of his older self, including numerous trophies, posters and a crystal chandelier, before setting fire to the closet, eventually destroying the entire house later. Walking through the garage, he passes several luxury automobiles, deciding on a McLaren P1 and drives off with a cat in the passenger seat, which transforms into a panther, as he rides off on Mulholland Drive. The video features product placement from clothing company PUMA. The house where the video was filmed has been featured in commercials for Samsung, Microsoft, Range Rover, and Mercedes-Benz.

=== Reception and accolades ===
Kat Bein of Billboard commented that the music video is "equally moody". A writer from Slate magazine drew comparison of the video to Michael Jackson's "Black or White" video, which he has been compared to frequently for his musical style. The bleak focus on celebrity and transformation, as well as the morphing of the cat into a black panther, were some of the aesthetics that resembles Jackson's video.

The video was nominated for Best Video at the 2016 MTV Europe Music Awards a day before its release, leaving many observers to wonder whether it was included based on merit or instead as a result of The Weeknd's popularity at the channel.

== Live performances ==
The Weeknd performed "Starboy" for the first time on the season 42 premiere of Saturday Night Live, along with "False Alarm" on October 1, 2016. He performed the song again on The Tonight Show Starring Jimmy Fallon as a medley with "I Feel It Coming" on November 24, 2016. Elements of "Starboy" were incorporated in the Weeknd's 59th Annual Grammy Awards performance with Daft Punk. An altered version was performed at the Super Bowl LV Halftime Show on February 7, 2021.

== Track listing ==
Digital download
No.	Title	Length
1.	"Starboy"	3:50

Digital download – Kygo Remix
No.	Title	Length
1.	"Starboy" (Kygo remix)	4:04

Germany CD single
No.	Title	Length
1.	"Starboy" (explicit)	3:50
2.	"Starboy" (clean)	3:50
Total length:		7:40

== Charts ==
=== Weekly charts ===
Chart (2016–2026)	Peak position
Argentina (Monitor Latino)	7
Australia (ARIA)	2
Australia Urban (ARIA)	1
Austria (Ö3 Austria Top 40)	8
Belarus Airplay (Eurofest)	40
Belgium (Ultratop 50 Flanders)	2
Belgium (Ultratop 50 Wallonia)	1
Bulgaria (PROPHON)	2
Canada Hot 100 (Billboard)	1
Canada AC (Billboard)	12
Canada CHR/Top 40 (Billboard)	1
Canada Hot AC (Billboard)	1
Colombia (National-Report)	55
Czech Republic Airplay (ČNS IFPI)	22
Czech Republic Singles Digital (ČNS IFPI)	1
Denmark (Tracklisten)	1
Euro Digital Song Sales (Billboard)	2
Finland (Suomen virallinen lista)	3
France (SNEP)	1
Germany (GfK)	3
Global 200 (Billboard)	34
Greece Digital Songs (Billboard)	1
Hong Kong (Billboard)	15
Hungary (Dance Top 40)	31
Hungary (Rádiós Top 40)	5
Hungary (Single Top 40)	6
Hungary (Stream Top 40)	1
Indonesia (Billboard)	21
Ireland (IRMA)	2
Israel International Airplay (Media Forest)	1
Italy (FIMI)	6
Japan Hot 100 (Billboard)	67
Latvia Streaming (LaIPA)	18
Lebanon (Lebanese Top 20)	15
Luxembourg Digital Song Sales (Billboard)	1
Malaysia (RIM)	7
MENA (IFPI)	20
Mexico Airplay (Billboard)	2
Netherlands (Dutch Top 40)	1
Netherlands (Single Top 100)	1
New Zealand (Recorded Music NZ)	1
Norway (VG-lista)	1
Poland Airplay (ZPAV)	35
Poland (Polish Streaming Top 100)	73
Portugal (AFP)	1
Romania (Media Forest)	5
Russia Airplay (Tophit)	5
Singapore (RIAS)	11
Scottish Singles Sales (Official Charts)	6
Slovakia Airplay (ČNS IFPI)	24
Slovakia Singles Digital (ČNS IFPI)	1
Slovenia (SloTop50)	23
South Korea International (Gaon)	37
Spain (Promusicae)	10
Sweden (Sverigetopplistan)	1
Switzerland (Schweizer Hitparade)	2
Thailand (Billboard)	20
United Arab Emirates (IFPI)	13
UK Singles (Official Charts)	2
US Billboard Hot 100	1
US Adult Contemporary (Billboard)	26
US Adult Pop Airplay (Billboard)	10
US Dance Club Songs (Billboard)	2
US Dance Airplay (Billboard)	3
US Hot R&B/Hip-Hop Songs (Billboard)	1
US Pop Airplay (Billboard)	3
US R&B/Hip-Hop Airplay (Billboard)	13
US Rhythmic Airplay (Billboard)	1
Vietnam (Vietnam Hot 100)	94

=== Year-end charts ===
Chart (2016)	Position
Argentina (Monitor Latino)	56
Australia (ARIA)	23
Australia Urban (ARIA)	1
Austria (Ö3 Austria Top 40)	66
Belgium (Ultratop Flanders)	37
Belgium (Ultratop Wallonia)	61
Canada (Canadian Hot 100)	32
Denmark (Tracklisten)	51
France (SNEP)	53
Germany (Official German Charts)	49
Hungary (Single Top 40)	40
Hungary (Stream Top 40)	28
Israel (Media Forest)	36
Italy (FIMI)	82
Netherlands (Dutch Top 40)	28
Netherlands (Single Top 100)	58
New Zealand (Recorded Music NZ)	33
Spain (PROMUSICAE)	94
Sweden (Sverigetopplistan)	45
Switzerland (Schweizer Hitparade)	66
UK Singles (OCC)	34
US Billboard Hot 100	58
US Hot R&B/Hip-Hop Songs (Billboard)	17
US Rhythmic (Billboard)	49

Chart (2017)	Position
Argentina (Monitor Latino)	71
Australia (ARIA)	42
Belgium (Ultratop Flanders)	85
Belgium (Ultratop Wallonia)	99
Brazil (Pro-Música Brasil)	50
Canada (Canadian Hot 100)	6
Denmark (Tracklisten)	47
France (SNEP)	80
Germany (Official German Charts)	97
Hungary (Single Top 40)	38
Hungary (Stream Top 40)	47
Israel International Airplay (Media Forest)	19
Latvia Airplay (LaIPA)	72
Netherlands (Dutch Top 40)	85
New Zealand (Recorded Music NZ)	42
Sweden (Sverigetopplistan)	66
Switzerland (Schweizer Hitparade)	43
UK Singles (OCC)	59
US Billboard Hot 100	20
US Dance Club Songs (Billboard)	49
US Dance/Mix Show Airplay (Billboard)	42
US Hot R&B/Hip-Hop Songs (Billboard)	13
US Mainstream Top 40 (Billboard)	28
US Rhythmic (Billboard)	26

Chart (2021)	Position
Global 200 (Billboard)	197

Chart (2022)	Position
Australia (ARIA)	86
Global 200 (Billboard)	100

Chart (2023)	Position
Australia (ARIA)	58
Global 200 (Billboard)	36
Global Singles (IFPI)	20
Poland (Polish Streaming Top 100)	97
UK Singles (OCC)	95

Chart (2024)	Position
Global 200 (Billboard)	51

Chart (2025)	Position
Global 200 (Billboard)	69

=== Decade-end charts ===
Chart (2010–2019)	Position
Australia (ARIA)	54
UK Singles (OCC)	80
US Hot R&B/Hip-Hop Songs (Billboard)	44

== Certifications ==
Region	Certification	Certified units/sales
Australia (ARIA)	15× Platinum	1,050,000^{‡}
Austria (IFPI Austria)	3× Platinum	90,000^{‡}
Belgium (BRMA)	2× Platinum	40,000^{‡}
Brazil (Pro-Música Brasil)	4× Diamond	1,000,000^{‡}
Canada (Music Canada)	Diamond	800,000^{‡}
Denmark (IFPI Danmark)	4× Platinum	360,000^{‡}
France (SNEP)	Diamond	233,333^{‡}
Germany (BVMI)	2× Platinum	1,200,000^{‡}
Italy (FIMI)	4× Platinum	400,000^{‡}
Mexico (AMPROFON)	Platinum+Gold	90,000^{‡}
New Zealand (RMNZ)	9× Platinum	270,000^{‡}
Norway (IFPI Norway)	3× Platinum	120,000^{‡}
Poland (ZPAV)	Diamond	250,000^{‡}
Portugal (AFP)	8× Platinum	200,000^{‡}
Spain (Promusicae)	3× Platinum	180,000^{‡}
Sweden (GLF)	4× Platinum	160,000^{‡}
United Kingdom (BPI)	6× Platinum	3,600,000^{‡}
United States (RIAA)	15× Platinum	15,000,000^{‡}
Streaming
Greece (IFPI Greece)	Diamond	10,000,000^{†}
Worldwide (IFPI)	—	1,000,000,000
^{‡} Sales+streaming figures based on certification alone.^{†} Streaming-only figures based on certification alone.

== Release history ==
Region	Date	Format	Version	Label(s)	Ref.
Worldwide	September 22, 2016	Digital download	Original	XO; Republic	
Italy	September 23, 2016	Contemporary hit radio	Original	Universal	
United Kingdom	September 23, 2016	Contemporary hit radio	Original	XO; Republic	
United Kingdom	September 23, 2016	Rhythmic contemporary	Original	XO; Republic	
United States	September 27, 2016	Contemporary hit radio	Original	XO; Republic	
United States	September 27, 2016	Rhythmic contemporary	Original	XO; Republic	
Germany	November 4, 2016	CD single	Original	Republic	
Worldwide	November 11, 2016	Digital download	Kygo remix	XO; Republic	

== See also ==
- List of best-selling singles in Australia
- List of highest-certified digital singles in the United States
- List of Billboard Hot 100 number-one singles of 2017
