= Party Monster (song) =

Single by the Weeknd

from the album Starboy
- Released: November 17, 2016
- Recorded: 2016
- Studio: Conway Recording Studios, Hollywood, California
- Genre: Trap
- Length: 4:09
- Label: XO; Republic
- Songwriters: Martin McKinney; Lana Del Rey; Abel Tesfaye; Benjamin Diehl; Ahmad Balshe
- Producers: Doc McKinney; The Weeknd; Ben Billions

The Weeknd singles chronology
"False Alarm" (2016)	"I Feel It Coming" / "Party Monster" (2016)	"Some Way" (2017)

Music video
- "Party Monster" on YouTube

Audio sample
- file; help

"Party Monster" is a song by the Canadian singer-songwriter the Weeknd, from his third studio album Starboy (2016). The song was released for digital download on November 17, 2016, as the album's fourth single. It was later sent to US urban contemporary radio on December 6, 2016. The song was written and produced by the Weeknd, Ben Billions, and Doc McKinney, with additional writing credits going to Belly and Lana Del Rey, the latter of whom provides background vocals.

== Background and promotion ==
On November 16, 2016, the Weeknd announced that he would be releasing the third and fourth singles of his third studio album, Starboy, "I Feel It Coming" and "Party Monster". The songs were released the following day for digital download.

== Composition ==
"Party Monster" is a trap song written in the key of E♭ minor in common time with a tempo of 77 beats per minute. The song follows a chord progression of E♭m–D♭–C♭–D♭.

== Commercial performance ==
"Party Monster" peaked at number 16 on the US Billboard Hot 100 and charted for a total of 19 weeks on the chart, where it was the third-highest peaking track from Starboy at the time before the resurgence of "Die for You" in the 2020s. It reached the top ten on both the R&B Songs chart and Hot R&B/Hip-Hop Songs chart. The song also charted and peaked at number 8 on the Canadian Hot 100, where it became the second-highest peaking track in the country from its parent album at the time and charted for 20 weeks. The single was certified 3× Platinum by the Recording Industry Association of America (RIAA) for combined sales and streaming equivalent units of over three million units in the United States in 2022.

== Music video ==
The music video for "Party Monster" premiered on January 12, 2017, and was directed by BRTHR. Rap-Up magazine described its synopsis: "[it] starts with Abel Tesfaye [The Weeknd] behind the wheel, driving through the desert before psychedelics hit and everything gets blurry. With religious and sensual imagery flashing quickly, The Weeknd is transported into a nightmare-like neon and fire-filled world where zombies make out while eating an eyeball cake. As the explosive (sic) clip resumes, it ties into previous visuals like "Starboy" and Abel's Mania vignettes, particularly with the neon cross and panther imagery. In one scene, said panther jumps out of a television screen, causing The Weeknd to sink into his bed. As faces continue to melt around him near the end of the video, he's back on the road. Recklessly, he drives at lightning quick speed, before watching a car drive off a cliff". BRTHR directed Travis Scott's "goosebumps" in a similar style. The cars used in the music video were a Mazda RX-7 FC3S and a Lamborghini Murcielago. Japanese singer and internet personality Joji is credited as the VHS camera operator for the music video.

== Remix ==
A remix of the song was released on January 19, 2017, in collaboration with GQ magazine. The music video for the remix was directed by David Helman and came out simultaneously with the new version of the song dubbed "Party Monster 2.0".

== Charts ==
=== Weekly charts ===
Chart (2016–2017)	Peak position
Australia (ARIA)	33
Austria (Ö3 Austria Top 40)	40
Canada Hot 100 (Billboard)	8
Canada CHR/Top 40 (Billboard)	9
Czech Republic Singles Digital (ČNS IFPI)	11
Denmark (Tracklisten)	16
France (SNEP)	88
Germany (GfK)	34
Greece International (IFPI)	21
Hungary (Single Top 40)	32
Hungary (Stream Top 40)	14
Ireland (IRMA)	21
Italy (FIMI)	70
Lebanon (Lebanese Top 20)	12
Netherlands (Single Top 100)	27
New Zealand (Recorded Music NZ)	27
Norway (VG-lista)	16
Portugal (AFP)	12
Scottish Singles Sales (Official Charts)	51
Slovakia Singles Digital (ČNS IFPI)	10
Spain (Promusicae)	71
Sweden (Sverigetopplistan)	26
Switzerland (Schweizer Hitparade)	21
UK Singles (Official Charts)	17
US Billboard Hot 100	16
US Hot R&B/Hip-Hop Songs (Billboard)	8
US R&B/Hip-Hop Airplay (Billboard)	42
US Rhythmic Airplay (Billboard)	1

=== Year-end charts ===
Chart (2016)	Position
Hungary (Stream Top 40)	97

Chart (2017)	Position
Canada (Canadian Hot 100)	91
US Hot R&B/Hip-Hop Songs (Billboard)	56
US Rhythmic (Billboard)	22

== Certifications ==
Region	Certification	Certified units/sales
Australia (ARIA)	2× Platinum	140,000^{‡}
Brazil (Pro-Música Brasil)	2× Platinum	120,000^{‡}
Canada (Music Canada)	4× Platinum	320,000^{‡}
Denmark (IFPI Danmark)	Platinum	90,000^{‡}
France (SNEP)	Platinum	200,000^{‡}
Italy (FIMI)	Gold	50,000^{‡}
New Zealand (RMNZ)	2× Platinum	60,000^{‡}
Norway (IFPI Norway)	Gold	20,000^{‡}
Poland (ZPAV)	Platinum	50,000^{‡}
Portugal (AFP)	Platinum	10,000^{‡}
United Kingdom (BPI)	Platinum	600,000^{‡}
United States (RIAA)	3× Platinum	3,000,000^{‡}
Streaming
Greece (IFPI Greece)	Gold	1,000,000^{†}
^{‡} Sales+streaming figures based on certification alone.^{†} Streaming-only figures based on certification alone.

== Release history ==
Region	Date	Format	Label(s)	Ref.
Worldwide	November 18, 2016 (Note: Release as a promotional single.)	Digital download	XO; Republic	
United States	December 6, 2016	Urban contemporary	XO; Republic	
United States	December 13, 2016	Rhythmic contemporary	XO; Republic	
