= Kodak Black discography =

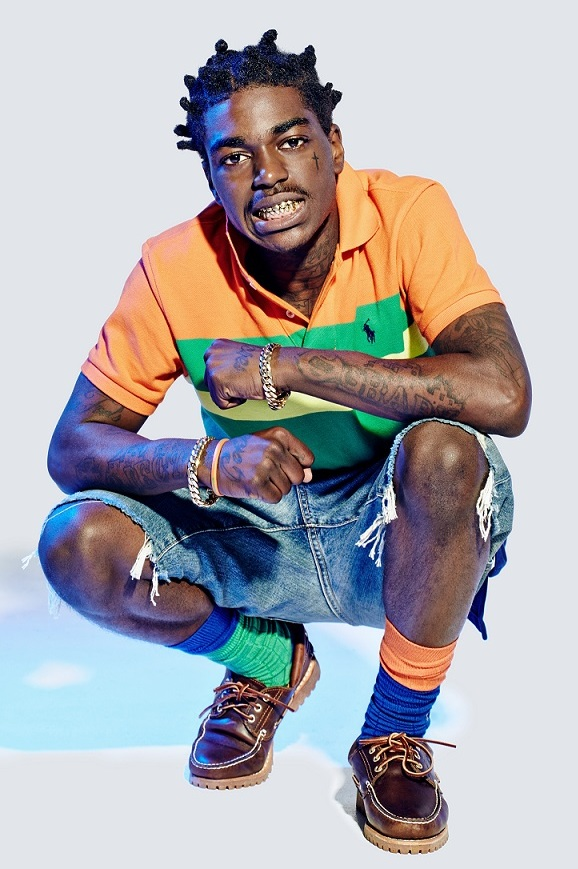
- Kodak Black pictured in 2016
- Studio albums: 8
- EPs: 2
- Singles: 36
- Music videos: 50
- Mixtapes: 11

American rapper Kodak Black has released eight studio albums, eleven mixtapes, two extended plays, and thirty-six singles (including ten singles as a featured artist), and fifty music videos. His highest-charting song is "Zeze", which features Travis Scott and Offset, and debuted and peaked at number two in 2018, becoming Black's second top 10 hit on the US Billboard Hot 100. His highest-charting solo song is "Super Gremlin", which peaked at number three on the Hot 100 in 2022.

== Albums ==
=== Studio albums ===
List of studio albums, with selected chart positions
Title	Album details	Peak chart positions						Certifications
Title	Album details	US	US R&B/ HH	US Rap	AUS	CAN	UK	Certifications
Painting Pictures	Released: March 31, 2017; Label: Dollaz N Dealz, Atlantic; Formats: Digital download, streaming	3	2	2	—	5	—	RIAA: 2× Platinum
Dying to Live	Released: December 14, 2018; Label: Dollaz N Dealz, Atlantic; Formats: Digital download, streaming	1	1	1	93	5	74	RIAA: 2× Platinum
Bill Israel	Released: November 11, 2020; Label: Dollaz N Dealz, Atlantic; Formats: Digital download, streaming	42	20	18	—	—	—	
Back for Everything	Released: February 25, 2022; Label: Atlantic; Formats: Digital download, streaming	2	1	1	—	15	—	RIAA: Platinum
Kutthroat Bill: Vol. 1	Released: October 28, 2022; Label: Atlantic; Formats: Digital download, streaming	8	4	3	—	—	—	
Pistolz & Pearlz	Released: May 26, 2023; Label: Atlantic; Formats: Digital download, streaming	19	6	4	—	—	—	
When I Was Dead	Released: November 10, 2023; Label: Vulture Love, Capitol; Formats: Digital download, streaming	74	27	20	—	—	—	
Just Getting Started	Released: October 31, 2025; Label: Vulture Love, Capitol; Formats: Digital download, streaming	77	23	17	—	—	—	
"—" denotes a recording that did not chart or was not released in that territory.

=== Compilation albums ===
List of compilation albums
Title	Album details
Baptized N Blood (with Sniper Gang)	Released: December 25, 2017; Label: Empire; Format: Digital download, streaming
Vulture Love Presents: The Last Zombies on Earth (with Vulture Love)	Released: May 31, 2024; Label: Vulture Love, Capitol; Format: Digital download, streaming

== Mixtapes ==
List of mixtapes, with selected chart positions
Title	Mixtape details	Peak chart positions				Certifications
Title	Mixtape details	US	US R&B/ HH	US Rap	CAN	Certifications
Project Baby	Released: December 26, 2013; Labels: Dollaz N Dealz; Format: Digital download, streaming	—	—	—	—	
Heart of the Projects	Released: December 25, 2014; Labels: Dollaz N Dealz; Format: Digital download, streaming	—	—	—	—	
Institution	Released: December 25, 2015; Labels: Dollaz N Dealz, Atlantic; Format: Digital download, streaming	—	—	—	—	
Lil B.I.G. Pac	Released: June 11, 2016; Labels: Dollaz N Dealz, Atlantic; Format: CD, digital download, streaming	134	49	—	—	
Project Baby 2	Released: August 18, 2017; Labels: Dollaz N Dealz, Atlantic; Format: CD, digital download, streaming	2	1	1	25	RIAA: 2× Platinum
F.E.M.A. (with Plies)	Released: October 31, 2017; Labels: Dollaz N Dealz, Atlantic; Format: Digital download, streaming	—	—	—	—	
Heart Break Kodak	Released: February 14, 2018; Labels: Dollaz N Dealz, Atlantic; Format: Digital download, streaming	25	15	13	34	RIAA: Gold
Haitian Boy Kodak	Released: May 14, 2021; Labels: Dollaz N Dealz, Atlantic; Format: Digital download, streaming	25	15	14	—	
Before the Album	Released: August 27, 2021; Label: Dollaz N Dealz; Format: Digital download	—	—	—	—	
Dieuson Octave	Released: November 1, 2024; Label: Vulture Love, Capitol; Format: Digital download, streaming	—	—	—	—	
Trill Bill	Released: November 29, 2024; Label: Vulture Love, Capitol; Format: Digital download, streaming	—	—	—	—	
Gift for the Streets	Released: December 25, 2024; Label: Vulture Love, Capitol; Format: Digital download, streaming	—	—	—	—	
Kodak the Blessing	Released: June 12, 2026; Label: Vulture Love, Capitol; Format: Digital download, streaming	176	—	—	—	
"—" denotes a recording that did not chart or was not released.

== EPs ==
Title	EP details	Peak chart positions
Title	EP details	US
Happy Birthday Kodak	Released: June 11, 2021; Label: Dollaz N Dealz, Sniper Gang, Atlantic; Formats: Streaming, digital download	180
Closure	Released: August 20, 2022; Label: Atlantic, Sniper Gang; Formats: Streaming, digital download	—

== Singles ==
=== As lead artist ===
List of singles, with showing year released, peak chart positions and album name
Title	Year	Peak chart positions										Certifications	Album
Title	Year	US	US R&B/HH	US Rap	AUS	CAN	FRA	IRE	NZ	UK	WW	Certifications	Album
"No Flockin'"	2014	95	38	—	—	—	—	—	—	—	—	RIAA: 9× Platinum; BPI: Silver; MC: Gold; RMNZ: Platinum	Heart of the Projects
"Skrilla"	2014	—	—	—	—	—	—	—	—	—	—	RIAA: Platinum	Heart of the Projects
"Skrt"	2014	— (Note: "Skrt" did not enter the Billboard Hot 100, but peaked at number 11 on the Bubbling Under Hot 100 chart.)	— (Note: "Skrt" did not enter the Hot R&B/Hip-Hop Songs chart, but peaked at number two on the Bubbling Under R&B/Hip-Hop Singles chart.)	—	—	—	—	—	—	—	—	RIAA: 2× Platinum	Heart of the Projects
"Like Dat"	2016	—	—	—	—	—	—	—	—	—	—		Institution
"Going Viral" (featuring Boosie Badazz)	2016	—	—	—	—	—	—	—	—	—	—		Non-album single
"There He Go"	2016	— (Note: "There He Go" did not enter the Billboard Hot 100, but peaked at number nine on the Bubbling Under Hot 100 Singles chart.)	48	—	—	—	—	—	—	—	—	RIAA: Platinum	Painting Pictures
"Tunnel Vision"	2017	6	4	2	—	17	—	—	—	—	—	RIAA: 9× Platinum; BPI: Gold; RMNZ: Platinum	Painting Pictures
"Horses" (with PnB Rock and A Boogie wit da Hoodie)	2017	— (Note: "Horses" did not enter the Billboard Hot 100, but peaked at number nine on the Bubbling Under Hot 100 Singles chart.)	— (Note: "Horses" did not enter the Hot R&B/Hip-Hop Songs chart, but peaked at number three on the Bubbling Under R&B/Hip-Hop Singles chart.)	—	—	—	—	—	—	—	—	RIAA: 2× Platinum; RMNZ: Gold	The Fate of the Furious: The Album
"First Day Out"	2017	61	27	20	—	80	—	—	—	—	—	RIAA: Platinum	Non-album singles
"Halloween"	2017	— (Note: "Halloween" did not enter the Billboard Hot 100, but peaked at number two on the Bubbling Under Hot 100 chart.)	45	—	—	—	—	—	—	—	—	RIAA: Gold	Non-album singles
"Codeine Dreaming" (featuring Lil Wayne)	2017	52	20	18	—	53	—	—	—	—	—	RIAA: 3× Platinum; RMNZ: Gold	Project Baby 2: All Grown Up and Heart Break Kodak
"Wake Up in the Sky" (with Gucci Mane and Bruno Mars)	2018	11	5	5	46	36	—	49	— (Note: "Wake Up in the Sky" did not enter the NZ Top 40 Singles Chart, but peaked at number 5 on the NZ Hot Singles Chart.)	65	—	RIAA: 6× Platinum; ARIA: Gold; BPI: Gold; RMNZ: 2× Platinum	Evil Genius
"If I'm Lyin, I'm Flyin"	2018	56	32	—	—	68	—	—	—	—	—	RIAA: Platinum	Dying to Live
"Zeze" (featuring Travis Scott and Offset)	2018	2	1	1	14	1	77	11	7	7	—	RIAA: 9× Platinum; ARIA: Platinum; BPI: Platinum; RMNZ: 4× Platinum	Dying to Live
"Take One"	2018	81	40	—	—	—	—	—	—	—	—	RIAA: Gold	Dying to Live
"Calling My Spirit"	2018	46	14	12	—	75	—	—	—	—	—	RIAA: 5× Platinum; RMNZ: Gold	Dying to Live
"Pimpin Ain't Eazy"	2019	— (Note: "Pimpin Ain't Eazy" did not enter the Billboard Hot 100, but peaked at number eight on the Bubbling Under Hot 100 chart.)	49	—	—	—	—	—	—	—	—	RIAA: 2× Platinum	Bill Israel
"Because of You"	2020	—	—	—	—	—	—	—	—	—	—		Non-album singles
"Vultures Cry 2" (featuring WizDaWizard and Mike Smiff)	2020	—	—	—	—	—	—	—	—	—	—		Non-album singles
"Last Day In"	2021	— (Note: "Last Day In" did not enter the Billboard Hot 100, but peaked at number three on the Bubbling Under Hot 100 chart.)	39	—	—	—	—	—	—	—	—		Non-album singles
"Every Balmain"	2021	—	—	—	—	—	—	—	—	—	—		Non-album singles
"Easter in Miami"	2021	—	—	—	—	—	—	—	—	—	—		Non-album singles
"Feelin' Peachy"	2021	— (Note: "Feelin' Peachy" did not enter the Billboard Hot 100, but peaked at number nine on the Bubbling Under Hot 100 chart.)	—	—	—	—	—	—	—	—	—	RIAA: Gold	Happy Birthday Kodak
"Before I Go" (featuring Rod Wave)	2021	— (Note: "Before I Go" did not enter the Billboard Hot 100, but peaked at number 10 on the Bubbling Under Hot 100 chart.)	46	—	—	—	—	—	—	—	—	RIAA: Gold	Non-album singles
"Senseless"	2021	— (Note: "Senseless" did not enter the Billboard Hot 100, but peaked at number 14 on the Bubbling Under Hot 100 chart.)	50	—	—	—	—	—	—	—	—	RIAA: Gold	Non-album singles
"Closure"	2021	—	—	—	—	—	—	—	—	—	—		Non-album singles
"Love & War"	2021	— (Note: "Love & War" did not enter the Billboard Hot 100, but peaked at number eight on the Bubbling Under Hot 100 chart.)	48	—	—	—	—	—	—	—	—	RIAA: Platinum; RMNZ: Gold	Back for Everything
"Super Gremlin"	2022	3	1	1	—	24	—	98	— (Note: "Super Gremlin" did not enter the NZ Top 40 Singles Chart, but peaked at number 27 on the NZ Hot Singles Chart.)	—	16	RIAA: 6× Platinum; BPI: Silver; MC: Platinum; RMNZ: Platinum	Sniper Gang Presents Syko Bob & Snapkatt: Nightmare Babies and Back for Everything
"I Wish"	2022	90	33	—	—	—	—	—	—	—	—		Back for Everything
"Usain Boo"	2022	81	28	20	—	—	—	—	—	—	—	RIAA: Gold	Back for Everything
"B.A.M" (with Yungeen Ace)	2022	—	—	—	—	—	—	—	—	—	—		All on Me
"Rocky Road" (with Moneybagg Yo)	2022	— (Note: "Rocky Road" did not enter the Billboard Hot 100, but peaked at number eight on the Bubbling Under Hot 100 chart.)	38	—	—	—	—	—	—	—	—		Gangsta Art
"Silent Hill" (with Kendrick Lamar)	2022	7	5	4	21	14	80	—	—	— (Note: "Silent Hill" did not enter the UK Singles Chart, but peaked at number 29 on the UK Streaming Chart.)	15		Mr. Morale & the Big Steppers
"Walk"	2022	100	31	—	—	—	—	—	—	—	—	RIAA: Platinum	Kutthroat Bill: Vol. 1
"Spin"	2022	— (Note: "Spin" did not enter the Billboard Hot 100, but peaked at number 18 on the Bubbling Under Hot 100 chart.)	50	—	—	—	—	—	—	—	—		Kutthroat Bill: Vol. 1
"I'm So Awesome"	2022	—	—	—	—	—	—	—	—	—	—		Kutthroat Bill: Vol. 1
"King Snipe" (with Gucci Mane)	2023	100	39	—	—	—	—	—	—	—	—		Breath of Fresh Air
"I Remember" (with Internet Money and Roddy Ricch)	2023	—	41	—	—	—	—	—	—	—	—		Non-album single
"No Love for a Thug"	2023	—	48	—	—	—	—	—	—	—	—		Pistolz & Pearlz
"Angel Pt. 1" (with NLE Choppa featuring Jimin, Jvke and Muni Long)	2023	65	18	11	—	63	—	99	— (Note: "Angel Pt. 1" did not enter the NZ Top 40 Singles Chart, but peaked at number 6 on the NZ Hot Singles Chart.)	82	19		Fast X (Original Motion Picture Soundtrack)
"Gunsmoke Town"	2023	—	—	—	—	—	—	—	—	—	—		Pistolz & Pearlz
"I Can't Lie" (with French Montana and London on da Track)	2023	—	—	—	—	—	—	—	—	—	—		Non-album single
"Hvn on Earth" (with Lil Tecca)	2023	88	30	—	—	69	—	—	— (Note: "Hvn on Earth" did not enter the NZ Top 40 Singles Chart, but peaked at number 17 on the NZ Hot Singles Chart.)	—	—		Tec
"Hope You Know"	2023	—	—	—	—	—	—	—	—	—	—		Non-album singles
"Eaze Your Mind"	2023	—	—	—	—	—	—	—	—	—	—		When I Was Dead
"2'CY"	2023	—	—	—	—	—	—	—	—	—	—		When I Was Dead
"Shawty" (with Major Nine)	2023	—	—	—	—	—	—	—	—	—	—		Nothin Major
"Lemme See"	2023	—	47	—	—	—	—	—	—	—	—		When I Was Dead
"Shampoo"	2024	— (Note: "Shampoo" did not enter the Billboard Hot 100, but peaked at number 17 on the Bubbling Under Hot 100 chart.)	47	—	—	—	—	—	—	—	—		Non-album singles
"Hit Stick"	2024	—	48	—	—	—	—	—	—	—	—		Non-album singles
"—" denotes a recording that did not chart or was not released in that territory.

=== As featured artist ===
List of singles, with showing year released, peak chart positions and album name
Title	Year	Peak chart positions					Certifications	Album
Title	Year	US	US R&B/HH	US Rap	CAN	WW	Certifications	Album
"Benjamins" (Nino Breeze featuring Kodak Black)	2016	—	—	—	—	—		Non-album single
"Lockjaw" (French Montana featuring Kodak Black)	2016	73	23	16	—	—	RIAA: 2× Platinum; MC: Platinum	Wave Gods, MC4 and Montana
"Watch Me Crank" (Iceberg featuring Kodak Black)	2016	—	—	—	—	—		Flame: Diary of a Soflo Legend
"Weatherman" (Yo Gotti featuring Kodak Black)	2016	—	—	—	—	—		White Friday (CM9)
"Drowning" (A Boogie wit da Hoodie featuring Kodak Black)	2017	38	15	11	53	—	RIAA: Diamond; BPI: Gold; MC: 7× Platinum; RMNZ: 2× Platinum	The Bigger Artist
"Pills & Automobiles" (Chris Brown featuring Yo Gotti, A Boogie wit da Hoodie and Kodak Black)	2017	46	17	—	67	—	RIAA: 2× Platinum; RMNZ: Platinum	Heartbreak on a Full Moon
"Bestie" (Bhad Bhabie featuring Kodak Black)	2019	—	— (Note: "Bestie" did not enter the Hot R&B/Hip-Hop Songs chart, but peaked at number eight on the Bubbling Under R&B/Hip-Hop Singles chart.)	—	—	—	RIAA: Gold	Non-album single
"Big Boy Diamonds" (Gucci Mane featuring Kodak Black)	2019	100	49	—	—	—	RIAA: Gold	Woptober II
"Hit Bout It" (Lil Yachty featuring Kodak Black)	2021	67	25	19	—	186		Non-album single
"Thugged Out" (YNW Melly featuring Kodak Black)	2021	— (Note: "Thugged Out" did not enter the Billboard Hot 100, but peaked at number 22 on the Bubbling Under Hot 100 chart.)	—	—	—	—		Just a Matter of Slime
"Anthem" (Riko With Da K featuring Kodak Black)	2022	—	—	—	—	—		Non-album single
"Save the Day" (NoCap featuring Kodak Black)	2022	—	—	—	—	—		Mr. Crawford
"Slidin'" (Jason Derulo featuring Kodak Black)	2022	—	—	—	—	—		Non-album singles
"Can't Stop Won't Stop" (King Combs featuring Kodak Black)	2022	— (Note: "Can't Stop Won't Stop" did not enter the Billboard Hot 100, but peaked at number two on the Bubbling Under Hot 100 chart.)	34	—	—	—		Non-album singles
"Wasted" (Diplo featuring Kodak Black and Koe Wetzel)	2023	— (Note: "Wasted" did not enter the Billboard Hot 100, but peaked at number 20 on the Bubbling Under Hot 100 chart.)	—	—	—	—		Diplo Presents Thomas Wesley, Chapter 2: Swamp Savant
"What It Is (Block Boy)" (Doechii featuring Kodak Black)	2023	29	8	—	31		RIAA: Platinum; ARIA: Platinum; BPI: Silver; MC: Platinum; RMNZ: Platinum	Non-album singles
"Shaka Laka" (6ix9ine and Yailin La Más Viral featuring Kodak Black)	2023	— (Note: "Shaka Laka" did not enter the Billboard Hot 100, but peaked at number 17 on the Bubbling Under Hot 100 chart.)	34	—	—	—		Non-album singles
"Brother Stone" (Don Toliver featuring Kodak Black)	2024	61	18	16	59	121	MC: Gold	Hardstone Psycho
"—" denotes a recording that did not chart or was not released in that territory.

== Other charted and certified songs ==
Title	Year	Peak chart positions						Certifications	Album
Title	Year	US	US R&B/HH	US Rap	CAN	NZ Hot	WW	Certifications	Album
"Everything 1K"	2016	84	31	—	47	—	—		Lil B.I.G. Pac
"Too Many Years" (featuring PnB Rock)	2016	— (Note: "Too Many Years" did not enter the Billboard Hot 100, but peaked at number one on the Bubbling Under Hot 100 chart.)	42	—	—	—	—	RIAA: Gold; RMNZ: Gold	Lil B.I.G. Pac
"Real Chill" (Rae Sremmurd featuring Kodak Black)	2016	—	— (Note: "Real Chill" did not enter the Billboard Hot R&B/Hip-Hop Songs chart, but peaked at number nine on the Bubbling Under R&B/Hip-Hop Singles chart.)	—	—	—	—		SremmLife 2
"Conscience" (featuring Future)	2017	93	42	—	—	—	—	RIAA: Platinum	Painting Pictures
"Day for Day"	2017	— (Note: "Day for Day" did not enter the Billboard Hot 100, but peaked at number four on the Bubbling Under Hot 100 chart.)	46	—	—	—	—	RIAA: Gold	Painting Pictures
"Coolin and Booted"	2017	— (Note: "Coolin and Booted" did not enter the Billboard Hot 100, but peaked at number seven on the Bubbling Under Hot 100 chart.)	50	—	—	—	—	RIAA: Gold	Painting Pictures
"U Ain't Never"	2017	— (Note: "U Ain't Never" did not enter the Billboard Hot 100, but peaked at number 24 on the Bubbling Under Hot 100 chart.)	— (Note: "U Ain't Never" did not enter the Hot R&B/Hip-Hop Songs chart, but peaked at number six on the Bubbling Under R&B/Hip-Hop Singles chart.)	—	—	—	—		Painting Pictures
"Reminiscing" (featuring A Boogie wit da Hoodie)	2017	—	— (Note: "Reminiscing" did not enter the Hot R&B/Hip-Hop Songs chart, but peaked at number seven on the Bubbling Under R&B/Hip-Hop Singles chart.)	—	—	—	—		Painting Pictures
"Up in Here"	2017	—	— (Note: "Up in Here" did not enter the Hot R&B/Hip-Hop Songs chart, but peaked at number 10 on the Bubbling Under R&B/Hip-Hop Singles chart.)	—	—	—	—		Painting Pictures
"Patty Cake"	2017	76	33	24	—	—	—	RIAA: 2× Platinum	Painting Pictures
"Corrlinks and JPay"	2017	—	—	—	—	—	—	RIAA: Gold	Painting Pictures
"Transportin'"	2017	46	18	13	52	—	—	RIAA: 6× Platinum; BPI: Silver; RMNZ: Platinum	Project Baby 2
"Roll in Peace" (featuring XXXTentacion)	2017	31	16	14	64	—	—	RIAA: 9× Platinum; BPI: Silver; RMNZ: Platinum	Project Baby 2
"Built My Legacy" (featuring Offset)	2017	— (Note: "Built My Legacy" did not enter the Billboard Hot 100, but peaked at number 11 on the Bubbling Under Hot 100 chart.)	— (Note: "Built My Legacy" did not enter the Billboard Hot R&B/Hip-Hop Songs chart, but peaked at number one on the Bubbling Under R&B/Hip-Hop Singles chart.)	—	—	—	—	RIAA: Gold	Project Baby 2
"Versatile"	2017	— (Note: "Versatile" did not enter the Billboard Hot 100, but peaked at number 15 on the Bubbling Under Hot 100 chart.)	— (Note: "Versatile" did not enter the Billboard Hot R&B/Hip-Hop Songs chart, but peaked at number two on the Bubbling Under R&B/Hip-Hop Singles chart.)	—	—	—	—	RIAA: Platinum	Project Baby 2
"6th Sense"	2017	— (Note: "6th Sense" did not enter the Billboard Hot 100, but peaked at number 19 on the Bubbling Under Hot 100 chart.)	— (Note: "6th Sense" did not enter the Billboard Hot R&B/Hip-Hop Songs chart, but peaked at number four on the Bubbling Under R&B/Hip-Hop Singles chart.)	—	—	—	—	RIAA: Gold	Project Baby 2
"Don't Wanna Breathe"	2017	— (Note: "Don't Wanna Breathe" did not enter the Billboard Hot 100, but peaked at number 20 on the Bubbling Under Hot 100 chart.)	— (Note: "Don't Wanna Breathe" did not enter the Billboard Hot R&B/Hip-Hop Songs chart, but peaked at number five on the Bubbling Under R&B/Hip-Hop Singles chart.)	—	—	—	—	RIAA: Platinum	Project Baby 2
"Unexplainable"	2017	—	—	—	—	—	—	RIAA: Gold	Project Baby 2
"Heart Mind" (with Piles)	2017	—	—	—	—	—	—	RMNZ: Gold	F.E.M.A.
"No More" (Metro Boomin featuring Travis Scott, Kodak Black, and 21 Savage)	2018	79	71	—	—	—	—	MC: Gold	Not All Heroes Wear Capes
"Lower Level" (Moneybagg Yo featuring Kodak Black)	2018	—	—	—	—	—	—	RIAA: Platinum	Reset
"Testimony"	2018	74	27	—	—	—	—	RIAA: Gold	Dying to Live
"This Forever"	2018	— (Note: "This Forever" did not enter the Billboard Hot 100, but peaked at number 20 on the Bubbling Under Hot 100 chart.)	—	—	—	—	—		Dying to Live
"Identity Theft"	2018	— (Note: "Identity Theft" did not enter the Billboard Hot 100, but peaked at number one on the Bubbling Under Hot 100 chart.)	43	—	—	29	—	RIAA: Gold	Dying to Live
"Gnarly" (featuring Lil Pump)	2018	88	34	—	76	22	—	RIAA: Gold	Dying to Live
"MoshPit" (featuring Juice Wrld)	2018	58	19	—	81	9	—	RIAA: Platinum	Dying to Live
"Close to the Grave"		—	—	—	—	—	—	RIAA: Gold	Dying to Live
"From the Cradle"		—	—	—	—	—	—	RIAA: Gold	Dying to Live
"Z Look Jamaican"	2021	— (Note: "Z Look Jamaican" did not enter the Billboard Hot 100, but peaked at number six on the Bubbling Under Hot 100 chart.)	—	—	—	—		RIAA: Gold	Haitian Boy Kodak
"Back Door" (Pop Smoke featuring Quavo and Kodak Black)	2021	— (Note: "Back Door" did not enter the Billboard Hot 100, but peaked at number 20 on the Bubbling Under Hot 100 chart.)	—	—	86	—	—		Faith
"Get Ready" (Rod Wave featuring Kodak Black)	2021	91	33	—	—	—	—		SoulFly (Deluxe)
"Hibachi" (Roddy Ricch featuring Kodak Black and 21 Savage)	2021	91	25	—	77	13	181		Live Life Fast
"How You Did That" (Gunna featuring Kodak Black)	2022	47	19	—	69	13	51		DS4Ever
"Let Me Know"	2022	— (Note: "Let Me Know" did not enter the Billboard Hot 100, but peaked at number three on the Bubbling Under Hot 100 chart.)	44	—	—	—	—		Back for Everything
"Back for Everything"	2022	— (Note: "Back for Everything" did not enter the Billboard Hot 100, but peaked at number 14 on the Bubbling Under Hot 100 chart.)	—	—	—	—	—		Back for Everything
"Smackers"	2022	— (Note: "Smackers" did not enter the Billboard Hot 100, but peaked at number 20 on the Bubbling Under Hot 100 chart.)	—	—	—	—	—		Back for Everything
"On Everything"	2022	— (Note: "On Everything" did not enter the Billboard Hot 100, but peaked at number five on the Bubbling Under Hot 100 chart.)	46	—	—	—	—		Back for Everything
"Take You Back" (featuring Lil Durk)	2022	— (Note: "Take You Back" did not enter the Billboard Hot 100, but peaked at number 17 on the Bubbling Under Hot 100 chart.)	—	—	—	—	—		Back for Everything
"Voodoo" (Future featuring Kodak Black)	2022	39	18	—	67	—	59		I Never Liked You
"300 Blackout"	2022	96	26	—	—	—	—	RIAA: Gold	Kutthroat Bill: Vol. 1
"Water (Drowning Pt. 2)" (A Boogie wit da Hoodie featuring Kodak Black)	2022	97	43	—	73	20	—		Me vs. Myself
"Grandson" (Lil Durk featuring Kodak Black)	2023	76	27	—	—	—	—		Almost Healed
"Field Trip" (Kanye West and Ty Dolla Sign as ¥$, Playboi Carti, and Don Toliver featuring Kodak Black)	2024	48	10	—	41	3	33		Vultures 2
"—" denotes a recording that did not chart or was not released in that territory.

== Guest appearances ==
List of non-single guest appearances, with other performing artists, showing year released and album name
Title	Year	Other artist(s)	Album
"Make It Happen"	2014	1WayFrank	On Top Soon
"Dreams Come True"	2014	1WayFrank	On Top Soon
"Touchdown"	2014	Rich the Kid	Feels Good to Be Rich
"Outchea"	2015	Plies	Ain't No Mixtape Bih 2
"Plug"	2016	Rich the Kid, Playboi Carti	Trap Talk
"Made It Out da Hood"	2016	Young Scooter	Street Lottery 3
"Lonely"	2016	DJ Twin	Day 1
"Pick These Hoes Apart"	2016	DJ Khaled, Jeezy, French Montana	Major Key
"Real Chill"	2016	Rae Sremmurd	SremmLife 2
"All I Want For Christmas"	2016	Dej Loaf	—N/a
"On Sight"	2017	Blac Youngsta	Illuminati
"Real Hitta"	2017	Plies	F.E.M.A.
"Chosen One"	2017	Youngboy Never Broke Again	—N/a
"Spar"	2017	Dreezy, 6LACK	—N/a
"Pressure"	2017	Jeezy, YG	Pressure
"My Dawg"	2017	Quality Control, Lil Baby, Quavo, & Moneybagg Yo	Control the Streets, Volume 1
"Pistol Heavy"	2017	G the Villain	900 Degreez
"iSpy" (Remix)	2017	Kyle	—N/a
"High Off Gun Powder"	2017	Fredo Santana, Chief Keef	Fredo Kruger 2
"Down for Life"	2017	DJ Khaled, PARTYNEXTDOOR, Future, Travis Scott, Rick Ross	Grateful
"Pull a Caper"	2017	DJ Khaled, Gucci Mane, Rick Ross	Grateful
"Show It"	2018	Zaytoven, Offset, T.I.	Trapholizay
"Calldrops"	2018	ASAP Rocky	Testing
"No More"	2018	Metro Boomin, Travis Scott, 21 Savage	Not All Heroes Wear Capes
"Benihana"	2018	Lil Durk	Signed to the Streets 3
"Tic Tac Toe"	2018	Meek Mill	Championships
"Till I'm Gone"	2019	Flipp Dinero	Love for Guala
"Lifestyle"	2019	French Montana, Kevin Gates	MONTANA
"I'm Not Crazy, Life Is"	2019	2 Chainz, Chance the Rapper	Rap or Go to the League
"On The Low"	2020	Shoreline Mafia	Mafia Bidness
"Back Door"	2021	Pop Smoke, Quavo	Faith
"Get Ready"	2021	Rod Wave	SoulFly (Deluxe)
"Levels"	2021	DaBaby	Back on My Baby Jesus Sh!t Again
"Mopstick"	2021	French Montana	They Got Amnesia
"Record First"	2021	Hotboii	Life Of A Hotboii
"Hibachi"	2021	Roddy Ricch, 21 Savage	Live Life Fast
"How You Did That"	2022	Gunna	DS4Ever
"Bussdown"	2022	Latto	777
"Save The Day"	2022	NoCap	Mr.Crawford
"Silent Hill"	2022	Kendrick Lamar	Mr. Morale & the Big Steppers
"Voodoo"	2022	Future	I Never Liked You
"Sufro"	2022	Anuel AA, Ñengo Flow	LLNM2
"All That"	2022	G Herbo	Survivor's Remorse
"Colors"	2023	Trippie Redd	Mansion Musik
"Grandson"	2023	Lil Durk	Almost Healed
"Hvn on Earth"	2023	Lil Tecca	Tec
"Still Play Valorant"	2024	D-Block Europe	Rolling Stone
"Yak's Prayer"	2024	Mustard	Faith of a Mustard Seed
"Field Trip"	2024	¥$, Kanye West, Ty Dolla Sign, Playboi Carti, Don Toliver	Vultures 2
"Drunk"	2024	¥$, Kanye West, Ty Dolla $ign, Peso Pluma	Vultures 2 (Digital Deluxe)
"Be Quiet"	2024	Yeat	Lyfestyle
"Florida Flow"	2025	Travis Scott	JackBoys 2
"Spend Dat" (Remix)	2026	Yung Miami, Lil Baby	—N/a

== Music videos ==
Year	Title	Director
As primary artist
2013	"Project Baby"	
2014	"5 On It"	
2014	"No Flockin'"	Bones Vision
2014	"Heart of the Project"	Bones Vision
2014	"Molly"	Bones Vision
2015	"Hungry"	KellyKidd
2015	"Skrilla"	Yoyointhebuilding
2015	"Skrt"	
2015	"Institution"	Yung Mik3
2016	"Me, Myself & I"	Yung Mik3
2016	"Deep In These Streets"	Yoyointhebuilding
2016	"HollyHood"	
2016	"Like Dat"	Yung Mik3
2016	"Can I"	Bones Vision
2016	"4th Quarter"	Bones Vision
2016	"There He Go"	Yung Mik3
2016	"Weatherman"	Kid Art
2017	"Tunnel Vision"	
2017	"Too Many Years"	DevKamera
2017	"Transportin'"	Kodak Black
2017	"First Day Out"	
2017	"Patty Cake"	Michael Garcia
2017	"Snot Thot"	Kodak Black
2017	"Halloween"	Be El Be
2017	"Brand New Glizzy"	Wavylord, Kodak Black
2017	"Cut Throat"	Kodak Black, Wavylord
2017	"Fuck It"	Kodak Black, Wavylord
2017	"I N U"	Kodak Black
2018	"Roll in Peace"	
2018	"Free Cool Pt. 2"	Wavylord
2018	"Fall Thru"	Wavylord
2018	"Poetical G"	Wavylord, Brandon Lovera
2018	"When Vultures Cry"	Kodak Black
2018	"If I'm Lyin, I'm Flyin"	Spencer Hord
2018	"Zeze"	Travis Scott
2018	"Calling My Spirit"	TJ Randall
2018	"Testimony"	JD Films, Kodak Black
2018	"Gnarly"	JD Films
2018	"Close To The Grave"	Kodak Black
2018	"From The Cradle"	Kodak Black
2018	"Christmas in Miami"	WavyyFlash
2019	"Transgression"	WavyyFlash
2019	"Pimpin Ain't Eazy"	Kodak Black, Sway Season
2019	"Expeditiously"	Noreggie
2019	"Needing Something"	Cam Busby
2019	"Malcolm X.X.X."	Kodak Black
As featured artist
2015	"Plug" (Rich the Kid featuring Playboi Carti and Kodak Black)	WSHH
2016	"Gooked Out" (Remix) (Kolyon featuring Kodak Black and Boosie Badazz)	
2016	"Lockjaw" (French Montana featuring Kodak Black)	SpiffTV
2016	"Real Chill" (Rae Sremmurd featuring Kodak Black)	Max
