= Shampoo (disambiguation) =

Shampoo is a soap-based liquid or solid used for washing hair.

Shampoo may also refer to:

== Arts, entertainment, and media ==
- Shampoo (duo), a British singing duo
- Shampoo (film), a 1975 film directed by Hal Ashby, starring Warren Beatty
- Shampoo (parody band) a short-lived Beatles tribute/parody band from Italy
- Shampoo (Ranma ½), a Joketsuzoku warrior character from the Ranma ½ manga series
- "Shampoo" (Benjamin Ingrosso song), 2020
- "Shampoo" (Kodak Black song), 2024

== Other uses ==
- Shampoo (massage), a body massage traditional in India, Persia, and more recently as part of the Victorian Turkish bath process
- Shampooing, in auto detailing, is the degreasing and cleaning of a vehicle
