= Pimpin' Ain't Easy =

Pimpin' Ain't Easy may refer to:

- A 1989 song by rapper Big Daddy Kane from his album It's a Big Daddy Thing
- A 1987 song by rapper Ice-T from the album Rhyme Pays, parenthetically titled "Somebody Gotta Do It (Pimpin' Ain't Easy!!!)
- "Pimpin Ain't Eazy", a 2019 song by Kodak Black
- A 2003 episode of the sitcom Yes, Dear
- The catchphrase of WWE wrestler The Godfather

- A 1999 song by rapper Ice-T from the album WWF Aggression, written for The Godfather.
