= First Day Out =

"First Day Out" may refer to:

- "First Day Out" (Tee Grizzley song)
- "First Day Out" (Kodak Black song)

== See also ==
- "1st Day Out tha Feds", Gucci Mane song
- "FDO" (song), Pooh Shiesty song
- "9/11 (First Day Out)", Hotboii song
