= Calling My Spirit =

2018 single by Kodak Black

Single by Kodak Black

from the album Dying to Live
- Released: November 30, 2018
- Length: 2:32
- Label: Atlantic; WEA
- Songwriters: Joshua Howard Luellen; Jacob Dutton; Bill Kapri
- Producers: Southside; Jake One

Kodak Black singles chronology
| "Take One" (2018) | "Calling My Spirit" (2018) | "Pimpin Ain't Eazy" (2019) |

Music video
- "Calling My Spirit" on YouTube

"Calling My Spirit" is a song recorded by American rapper Kodak Black for his second studio album Dying to Live. It was released on November 30, 2018, via Atlantic Records and WEA, with production by Southside and Jake One.

== Background ==
The song was released as the fourth single for the album, following preceding singles "If I'm Lyin, I'm Flyin", "Zeze" and "Take One". HotNewHipHop described the song as Black baring "his soul over emotional guitar licks. He speaks to himself, and battles his own inner turmoil by pinpointing the proper way to move."

== Composition ==
Described as being "powered by heavy bass hits and smooth guitar strings", the song is lyrically said to be about Black's troubling past and his appreciation for current successes. Hip Hop Corner France said that the song is a return of Black to "a style of his own" which is his way of mumble rap singing "that stretches the words, giving him nonchalant air that works so much." A song representing Black in "a more reflective mood" and a show of his "spiritual side driven by smooth melodies and punchy drum work", Rap-Up called the song an introspection of Black who "raps over a stripped-down instrumental".

== Music video ==
The music video was released a week after the song's release. Featuring a two-minute clip of Kodak "looking at the prison system in the United States", the official music video for the song was released on December 5, 2018. It was noted by XXL Mag for having "a variety of messages". Noted as having "trippy visuals" by HotNewHipHop, the video shows Kodak sitting on a throne while being surrounded by women. In another scene, a man is shown having handcuffs placed on his wrists in prison. Later, Kodak appears as a God-like figure surrounded by white clouds before putting together his hands to pray.

== Charts ==
=== Weekly charts ===
| Chart (2018–19) | Peak position |
|---|---|
| Canada Hot 100 (Billboard) | 75 |
| US Billboard Hot 100 | 46 |
| US Hot R&B/Hip-Hop Songs (Billboard) | 14 |
| US Rhythmic Airplay (Billboard) | 34 |

=== Year-end charts ===
| Chart (2019) | Position |
|---|---|
| US Hot R&B/Hip-Hop Songs (Billboard) | 56 |

== Certifications ==
| Region | Certification | Certified units/sales |
|---|---|---|
| New Zealand (RMNZ) | Gold | 15,000^{‡} |
| United States (RIAA) | 5× Platinum | 5,000,000^{‡} |
^{‡} Sales+streaming figures based on certification alone.
