= Giorgio Verdelli =

Italian documentarist (born 1959)

- Born: 19 May 1959 (age 66); Naples, Italy
- Occupation(s): Writer; Filmmaker

Giorgio Verdelli (born 19 May 1959) is an Italian writer, director and producer of documentaries and musical programs.

== Biography ==
Born in Naples, in the 1970s Verdelli founded Shampoo, a band who covered Beatles' song in Neapolitan language. In the 1980s he was part of the editorial staff of Renzo Arbore's Quelli della Notte, and collaborated to the soundtracks of Nanni Loy's Where's Picone? (1984) and Salvatore Piscicelli's Blues Metropolitano (1985).

In 2018, Verdelli's documentary film about Pino Daniele Il tempo resterà won the Nastro d'Argento for best documentary. In 2020, his documentary film about Paolo Conte, Paolo Conte, Via con me, premiered at the 77th Venice International Film Festival, before having a successful run in Italian cinemas and being also released in France. His 2023 documentary film about Enzo Jannacci, Enzo Jannacci vengo anch'io, premiered at the 80th Venice International Film Festival and was awarded the David di Donatello for best documentary.
