= Dying to Live (Kodak Black album) =

Studio album by Kodak Black
- Released: December 14, 2018
- Recorded: 2018
- Length: 47:47
- Label: Atlantic
- Producers: Ben Billions; Blasian; D. A. Doman; Diablo; Dyryk; Ian McKee; Jake One; Kaixen; Leon Thomas; London on da Track; Major Nine; Natra Average; Nik Dean; RBP; Rex Kudo; Rippa on the Beat; SkipOnDaBeat; Snapz; Southside; Youngin’ Chriso

Kodak Black chronology
Heart Break Kodak (2018)	Dying to Live (2018)	Bill Israel (2020)

Singles from Dying to Live
- 1. "If I'm Lyin, I'm Flyin" Released: September 28, 2018; 2. "Zeze" Released: October 12, 2018; 3. "Take One" Released: November 16, 2018; 4. "Calling My Spirit" Released: November 30, 2018

Dying to Live is the second studio album by American rapper Kodak Black. It was released on December 14, 2018, via Atlantic Records. It follows his Heart Break Kodak mixtape, released earlier in 2018, as well as his previous mixtape, Project Baby 2: All Grown Up, the deluxe edition of his mixtape Project Baby 2, released in 2017. The production on the album was handled by multiple producers including Southside, Jake One, D. A. Doman, and London on da Track. The album features guest appearances from Lil Pump, Travis Scott, Offset and Juice Wrld.

Dying to Live was supported by four singles: "If I'm Lyin, I'm Flyin", "Zeze", "Take One" and "Calling My Spirit". The album received highly positive reviews from music critics and was a commercial success; it debuted at number one on the US Billboard 200 chart, earning 89,000 album-equivalent units in its first week. In November 2020, the album was certified platinum by the Recording Industry Association of America (RIAA).

== Background ==
On November 25, 2018, Kodak Black announced via Twitter that he would be releasing his second studio album the following month. Black wrote on social media that "Yung Nigga Been Getting Money... I Did Everything The Streets Glorified #AlbumDropping Next Month." The album is Black's first following his release from jail in August.

On December 11, 2018, Kodak Black shared the album's tracklist.

== Promotion ==
The album's lead single, "If I'm Lyin, I'm Flyin" was released on September 28, 2018, along with the music video.

The second single, "Zeze" featuring Travis Scott and Offset was released on October 12, 2018. The music video was released on November 23, 2018.

The third single, "Take One", was released on November 16, 2018, and the fourth single, "Calling My Spirit", was released on November 30, 2018. The music video for "Calling My Spirit" was released on December 5, 2018.

The first two promotional singles, "Testimony" and "MoshPit" featuring Juice Wrld was released on December 8, 2018, and December 12, 2018, respectively. The music video for "Testimony" was released on December 10, 2018.

== Critical reception ==
Professional ratings
Review scores
Source	Rating
The Guardian	2/5 stars
HipHopDX	4.0/5
The Music Outlook	4/5
NME	4/5 stars

Dying to Live, aside from a rare negative review from The Guardian, received critical acclaim. HipHopDX's Daniel Spielberger said: "Dying to Live is an imperfect window into a troubled soul. At times, it's unclear whether Kodak is being honest or disingenuously begging for sympathy. Even if it's carefully executed and shows artistic growth, the album's mature subject matter is overshadowed by Kodak's alleged history." Kyann-Sian Williams of NME wrote that "when Kodak preaches, people listen." He commended the album's diversity, identifying "a buoyant, lightweight vibrancy" on the song "Zeze", "which helps to balance out an album that could otherwise be weighed down methodical lyrics about with heavy lyrics about gang activity." Williams also praised Black's use of guest features and concluded: "Throughout Dying To Live, Kodak delivers a vibe that’s versatile and raw, packed with clever, complex storytelling. Yet the record doesn’t become self-indulgent; the rapper never forgets his audience, peppering his more uncompromising material with all-out bangers. A compelling album characteristic of Florida’s fertile rap scene."

== Commercial performance ==
Dying to Live debuted at number one on the US Billboard 200 with 89,000 album-equivalent units (of which 5,000 were pure album sales). It is Kodak Black's first number-one album on the chart.

== Track listing ==
Credits adapted from Tidal.

No.	Title	Writer(s)	Producer(s)	Length
1.	"Testimony"	Bill Kapri; Chad Thomas	Major Nine	4:00
2.	"This Forever"	Kapri; London Holmes; Masamune Kudo; Leon Thomas	Thomas; London on da Track; Rex Kudo	2:41
3.	"Identity Theft"	Kapri; Ricardo Toussaint	Rippa on the Beat; Youngin' Chriso^{[a]}	2:07
4.	"Gnarly" (featuring Lil Pump)	Kapri; Gazzy Garcia; Derek Garcia; Julian Munro; Sebastian Leon	Dyryk; Diablo; Kaixen^{[a]}	3:06
5.	"Zeze" (featuring Travis Scott and Offset)	Kapri; Jacques Webster II; Kiari Cephus; David Doman; Christina Gandy-Rodgers; Justin Thomas; Marcus Prince	D. A. Doman	3:48
6.	"Take One"	Kapri; Benjamin Diehl	Ben Billions	2:45
7.	"MoshPit" (featuring Juice Wrld)	Kapri; Jarad Higgins; Christopher Gibbs; Edgar Ferrera	Natra Average; SkipOnDaBeat	2:44
8.	"Transgression"	Kapri; D. Garcia; Ian McKee; Russell Pochop	Dyryk; McKee; RBP	2:15
9.	"Malcolm X.X.X."	Kapri; Kenneth Hirsch; Malcolm X; Marti Sharron	Major Nine	3:15
10.	"Calling My Spirit"	Kapri; Jacob Dutton; Joshua Luellen	Jake One; Southside	2:32
11.	"In the Flesh"	Kapri; Diehl; Nick Dean; Niko Varv	Ben Billions; Blasian; Snapz; Nik Dean^{[a]}	3:08
12.	"Close to the Grave"	Kapri; Lester Williams	LBeats	3:41
13.	"From the Cradle"	Kapri; Williams	LBeats	3:11
14.	"If I'm Lyin, I'm Flyin"	Kapri; Diehl; Harold Thomas; Lee Jones	Ben Billions	2:10
15.	"Needing Something"	Kapri; C. Thomas	Major Nine	3:12
16.	"Could of Been Different"	Kapri; Brett Bailey; D. Garcia; Munro	Beats Bailey; Clips Ahoy; Dyryk; Kaixen	3:12
Total length:				47:47

Notes

- ^{^[a]} signifies an uncredited co-producer
- "Zeze" is stylized in all caps

Sample credits

- "Malcolm X.X.X." contains a sample from "No One in the World", written by Kenneth Hirsch and Marti Sharron, as performed by Anita Baker, as well as recordings from speeches given by Malcolm X.

== Personnel ==
Credits adapted from Tidal.

Technical

- Derek "Dyryk" Garcia – mixing (tracks 2–4, 6–16)
- Jacob Richards – mixing (track 5)
- Jaycen Joshua – mixing (track 5)
- Mike Seaberg – mixing (track 5)
- Rashawn McLean – mixing (track 5)
- Chris Athens – mastering (all tracks)
- Chris Ulrich – engineering (all tracks)
- Drew Drucker – engineering (all tracks)
- Jamie Peters – engineering (all tracks)
- Tyler Unland – engineering (all tracks)

== Charts ==
=== Weekly charts ===
Chart (2018–19)	Peak position
Australian Albums (ARIA)	93
Belgian Albums (Ultratop Flanders)	99
Canadian Albums (Billboard)	5
Danish Albums (Hitlisten)	28
Dutch Albums (Album Top 100)	17
Finnish Albums (Suomen virallinen lista)	36
French Albums (SNEP)	146
Irish Albums (IRMA)	93
Latvian Albums (LAIPA)	16
Norwegian Albums (VG-lista)	21
Swedish Albums (Sverigetopplistan)	39
UK Albums (Official Charts)	74
US Billboard 200	1
US Top R&B/Hip-Hop Albums (Billboard)	1

=== Year-end charts ===
Chart (2019)	Position
US Billboard 200	33
US Top R&B/Hip-Hop Albums (Billboard)	19

== Certifications ==
Region	Certification	Certified units/sales
Denmark (IFPI Danmark)	Gold	10,000^{‡}
New Zealand (RMNZ)	Platinum	15,000^{‡}
United States (RIAA)	2× Platinum	2,000,000^{‡}
^{‡} Sales+streaming figures based on certification alone.
