= Kutthroat Bill: Vol. 1 =

Studio album by Kodak Black
- Released: October 28, 2022
- Genres: Hip-hop; trap
- Labels: Sniper Gang; Atlantic
- Producers: 8th; ABOnTheBeat; AJ Stay Workin; Al Cres; Ayala; Ayo B; Ben Billions; C-Clip Beatz; Carl Paul; Carlton McDowell; D-Roc; David x Eli; Dez Wright; Don't Trip; Dr. Zeuz; Dyleechi; Dyryk; Eero Turunen; G Koop; Hittah; Honorable C.N.O.T.E.; Kollision; Loaded; Metro Boomin; OG Parker; Rippa on the Beat; Schife Karbeen; SkipOnDaBeat; Smash David; Snapz; TMGMoneyGame; Tracksion; Tye Beats; Wallis Lane; Wheezy

Kodak Black chronology
Back for Everything (2022)	Kutthroat Bill: Vol. 1 (2022)	Pistolz & Pearlz (2023)

Singles from Kutthroat Bill: Vol. 1
- 1. "Walk/Spin" Released: September 16, 2022; 2. "I'm So Awesome" Released: September 30, 2022

Professional ratings
Review scores
Source	Rating
AllMusic	3.5/5 stars

Kutthroat Bill: Vol. 1 is the fifth studio album by American rapper Kodak Black. It was released through Atlantic Records and Sniper Gang, on October 28, 2022. The album features guest appearances from Lil Crix, VVSNCE, NFL Tuewop and Prince Swanny. Production is handled by Ben Billions, Wheezy, Metro Boomin, Honorable C.N.O.T.E., Smash David, OG Parker, G Koop, Rippa on the Beat, Ayo B, Dr. Zeuz, Dyryk, Tye Beats, SkipOnDaBeat, and C-Clip Beatz, among others. The album also marks Kodak Black's second and last project of 2022.

== Release and promotion ==
=== Singles ===
The lead single, "Walk/Spin", was released on September 16, 2022, as a dual single. Both songs are produced by Tye Beats, while "Spin" was also produced by 8th. The song "Walk" peaked at number 100 on the US Billboard Hot 100, and peaked at number 31 on the US Hot R&B/Hip-Hop Songs. The song "Spin" did not enter the US Billboard Hot 100, but peaked at number 18 on the US Bubbling Under Hot 100 Singles chart, and peaked at number 50 on the US Hot R&B/Hip-Hop Songs.

The second and final single, "I'm So Awesome", was released on September 30, 2022. The song was produced by Metro Boomin and David x Eli.

=== Music videos ===
The music video for the song "Walk", was released on September 16, 2022, the same day as the single's release. And, the second music video for the song "Spin", was released on September 21, 2022.

The third music video for the song "300 Blackout" was released on October 31, 2022. The fourth music video for the song "At The Cross" was released on November 8, 2022. The fifth music video for the song "Ammunition" was released on December 14, 2022. The sixth music video "Kodak The Boss" was released on January 5, 2023. And, the seventh music video "Starter Kit", was released on February 8, 2023.

== Commercial performance ==
Kutthroat Bill: Vol. 1 debuted at number 8 on the US Billboard 200, earning 43,000 album-equivalent units (including 3,000 copies in pure album sales) in its first week of release. This became Kodak Black's fifth US top-10 project debut, and his tenth entry on the chart. The project also opened at number 4 and number 3 on the US Top R&B/Hip-Hop Albums chart and on the US Top Rap Albums chart, respectively, which also became both Kodak's second top-5 debut, and both his ninth and his eighth entry on the chart overall.

== Track listing ==
Credits adapted from Spotify and Genius.

Kutthroat Bill: Vol. 1 track listing
No.	Title	Writer(s)	Producer(s)	Length
1.	"Kodak The Boss"	Bill. K. Kapri; Jesus Bobe; Eero Turunen	Dr. Zeuz; Turunen^{[a]}	2:13
2.	"300 Blackout"	Kapri; Bobe; Andrew O'Brien	Dr. Zeuz; Ayo B	2:46
3.	"Slay Like Santa"	Kapri; Edgar Ferrera	SkipOnDaBeat	2:13
4.	"If You Ever"	Kapri; Benjamin Diehl; Ian Lewis; Terrence Rolle	Ben Billions; Schife Karbeen; Tracksion	3:37
5.	"I Can't Sleep"	Kapri; Carlton Mays, Jr.; Joshua Parker; Samuel Jimenez; Robert Mandell; Rodriguez Woods	Honorable C.N.O.T.E.; OG Parker; Smash David; G Koop; Kollision	2:25
6.	"Demand My Respect"	Kapri; Ferrera; Almando Cresso; Carlton McDowell	SkipOnDaBeat; Al Cres; McDowell	2:32
7.	"Play" (featuring Lil Crix)	Kapri; Cristian Denis; Kristo Ventsel	Dyleechi	2:03
8.	"Starter Kit" (featuring VVSNCE)	Kapri; Kamil Budek; Joshua Patrick McQuiggan; Arin Jamal Fields; Essiance Davis	Loaded; Hittah; AJ Stay Workin	2:36
9.	"I'm So Awesome"	Kapri; Leland Wayne; Davis Ruoff; Elias Klughammer	Metro Boomin; David x Eli	3:07
10.	"Game From Pluto"	Kapri; Wesley Glass; Dylan Cleary-Krell	Wheezy; Dez Wright	2:49
11.	"Walk"	Kapri; Tye Gibson	Tye Beats	2:46
12.	"Spin"	Kapri; Gibson; DeWud Miyal Carr	Tye Beats; 8th	2:31
13.	"Ammunition" (featuring NFL Tuewop)	Kapri; Jermaine Smith; Gabre Brown	C-Clip Beatz	3:12
14.	"Hop Out Shoot"	Kapri; Carl Donovan Benoit	Carl Paul	2:57
15.	"Kutthroat Barbie"	Kapri; Derek Garcia; Niles Terrell Groce; Nima Jahanbin; Paimon Jahanbin; Steven Richard Ayala	Dyryk; Snapz; Wallis Lane; Ayala^{[b]}; Don't Trip^{[b]}	2:44
16.	"At The Cross"	Kapri; Ricardo Toussaint	Rippa on the Beat	2:30
17.	"Freezing My Pinky"	Kapri; Daniel Lebrun; Sven Steenbergen	D-Roc; ABOnTheBeat	2:19
18.	"Bad Man" (featuring Prince Swanny)	Kapri; Garcia; Bobe; O'Brien; Taryll Swan	Dyryk; Dr. Zeuz; Ayo B	2:18
19.	"Silencer"	Kapri; Love Axelsson Gauffin; James DeBeradine	TMGMoneyGame	3:09
Total length:				50:56

=== Notes ===
- ^{^[a]} signifies a co-producer
- ^{^[b]} signifies an additional producer

== Charts ==
Chart performance for Kutthroat Bill: Vol. 1
Chart (2022)	Peak position
US Top Rap Albums (Billboard)	3
US Top R&B/Hip-Hop Albums (Billboard)	4
US Billboard 200	8
