= Bill Israel =

2020 studio album by Kodak Black

Studio album by Kodak Black
- Released: November 11, 2020
- Recorded: 2018–2019
- Length: 33:49
- Label: Atlantic
- Producers: Lbeats; TrapMoneyBenny; Nova Wav; Dubba-AA; Greedy Money; OTW; SK; Keryus; Dyryk; Tone Cold; RBP; Ian McKee; Kuya; Taz Taylor; Charlie Handsome; Nick Mira; DzyOnDaBeat; C Clip Beatz; Earl On The Beat; Beats By Bangs; DJ Showtime

Kodak Black chronology
Dying to Live (2018)	Bill Israel (2020)	Haitian Boy Kodak (2021)

Singles from Bill Israel
- 1. "Pimpin Ain't Eazy" Released: February 25, 2019

Professional ratings
Review scores
Source	Rating
AllMusic	3/5 stars
RapReviews	5/10

Bill Israel is the third studio album by American rapper Kodak Black. It was released on November 11, 2020, through Atlantic Records. The production on the album was handled by multiple producers including Nova Wav, Nick Mira, Charlie Handsome and Taz Taylor among others. The album also features guest appearances from Tory Lanez, Jackboy, Gucci Mane, CBE and Lil Yachty.

Bill Israel was preceded by the single "Pimpin Ain't Eazy". It debuted at number 42 on the US Billboard 200 chart, earning 16,000 album-equivalent units in its first week.

== Background ==
Kodak took to Instagram to announce his third studio album on October 26, 2020, while serving a 46-month prison sentence. In this post, Kodak revealed the project's title, length, and cover art, which features Kodak alongside a Rabbi, surrounded by doodles. Many of the sketches are religious, such as the multiple crosses, a Star of David, and "#THESTAROFDAVID". These are in reference to Kodak's Hebrew Israelite identity, which he adopted while he was incarcerated after studying scripture with Priest Kahan, a teacher who served as a prison chaplain.

On November 5, 2020, Kodak Black published the album's tracklist. Similar religious imagery to the front cover art is also present on the tracklist.

== Commercial performance ==
Bill Israel debuted at number 42 on the US Billboard 200 chart, earning 16,000 album-equivalent units in its first week. This became Kodak Black's lowest charting album to date.

== Track listing ==
Bill Israel track listing
No.	Title	Producer(s)	Length
1.	"Remember the Times"	L Beats	3:23
2.	"I Wanna Live"	TrapMoneyBenny; Nova Wav; Chef Boya Dru	1:52
3.	"Eeny, Meeny, Miny, Moe"	Greedy Money; Duba-AA	3:39
4.	"Spain" (featuring Tory Lanez and Jackboy)	John $K McGee; Xeryus; Hector Chaparro	4:45
5.	"The Fire"	Ian McKee; Kuya; Dyryk; RBProd	2:38
6.	"Pimpin Ain't Eazy"	Taz Taylor; Nick Mira; Charlie Handsome	2:57
7.	"I Knew It" (featuring Gucci Mane and CBE)	Dyryk; DZYonthebeat	2:13
8.	"Feeling Myself Today"	Earl on the Beat; Beats By Bangs	3:08
9.	"Serene"	C-ClipBeatz	3:35
10.	"Make a Hit" (featuring Lil Yachty)	DJ Showtime; Dyryk; Tone Cold	3:31
11.	"Dummy Green"	C-ClipBeatz	2:08
Total length:			33:49

== Charts ==
Chart performance for Bill Israel
Chart (2020)	Peak position
US Billboard 200	42
US Top R&B/Hip-Hop Albums (Billboard)	20
