= Shampoo (parody band) =

Italian Beatles parody band

- Origin: Naples, Italy
- Genres: Pop, rock
- Years active: 1978–1981, 2001, 2003, 2006; 2008–2009 (as Shampoo Plus or SH+)
- Label: EMI
- Past members: Lino D’Alessio; Pino De Simone; Costantino Iaccarino; Massimo D’Alessio

Shampoo were an Italian tribute/parody band from Naples, who enjoyed a short period of popularity in the early 1980s as spoofers of the Beatles.

== Background and career ==
The band were originally formed in 1978 by radio host and DJ Giorgio Verdelli for a radio show on a Neapolitan radio station, immediately after Corrado Ferlaino, then chairman of S.S.C. Napoli, had announced a Beatles reunion to celebrate the team’s victory over Liverpool F.C. in a UEFA Cup match. It was very obviously a joke, as the band who performed on the radio were actually 'Shampoo', four local musicians who took their name from their first song, “Si ‘e llave tu” (“If you wash it”), a parody of “She Loves You” with a Neapolitan lyric about an ugly-looking girl who would improve her appearance by washing her hair regularly. The band’s arrangements, sounds and vocals were remarkably similar to the originals: indeed, unlike their contemporary British "colleagues" The Rutles, whose repertoire consisted in Beatles-sounding original songs (the four Neapolitans were not only aware but highly respectful of the Rutles, thanks to bassist Costantino Iaccarino being an early fan of Monty Python when the troupe was virtually unknown in Italy), Shampoo had an attitude more like a tribute band, in that the music was left untouched; however, the song lyrics were all rewritten in strict Neapolitan and verged on incomprehensibility for non-Neapolitans because of their abundant use of local slang expressions, which made the band sound to outsiders like they were singing in garbled English. Because of this, the “joke” was highly successful, as no less than 150,000 people tuned in to listen to the supposed “Beatles” reunion.

After a handful of live shows in and around Naples, noted Italian pop arranger and conductor Vince Tempera took notice of the band and secured them a one-album deal with the Italian branch of EMI. In 1980, they recorded their first and so far only official album release, In Naples 1980/81, a multi-leveled Beatles parody. The rewritten lyrics are mainly about the suburban world of Naples and feature many colourful, ironical portraits of picturesque local characters; the only exceptions are “Si fosse 'o re” (“If I were the king”), a rewrite of “Because”, where a boy imagines himself as a fairy-tale king in a sentimental plea to his girlfriend, and “So' fesso” (“I'm stupid”), a partial parody of “No Reply", where a heartbroken lover blames himself for driving his loved one away from him. The album title and its cover are direct parodies of The Beatles 1962-1966, also known as the “Red Album”; the cover photo of In Naples features the four Shampoo looking down the stairwell of the EMI Italy offices, in a similar pose as the Beatles on the stairwell of the EMI London headquarters, while the label on the record features a red tomato, a parody of the Beatles’ Apple Records label. The album was a moderate hit in Italy, with the band’s popularity increasing in 1981 after a number of TV appearances.

== Disbanding and later history ==
After 1981, the band formally dissolved. They reunited in 2001 for a series of shows throughout central and southern Italy. Two more reunions followed: one for the 2003 “Beatles Day” in Brescia and one for the forty-fifth anniversary of “Love Me Do” in 2006, performing the song live in Rome along with several other Italian acts. In 2009, a new act called Shampoo Plus or SH+ emerged from two members of the original Shampoo—"Lennon" guitarist/vocalist Massimo D'Alessio and "McCartney" bassist/guitarist/vocalist Costantino Iaccarino, joined by Iaccarino's younger brother Mario on lead guitar—and an official website was created, announcing a new album with 12 new parodies and rewrites. The site has since gone offline and the album itself has never materialized, although SH+ produced two videos for two new tracks (respectively parodies of "Hey Jude" and "The Long and Winding Road", still rewritten in Neapolitan but in a slightly more serious vein than previous Shampoo material) and performed all 12 of them during their 2008–2009 live shows; the videos and the tracks were subsequently hosted on the band's MySpace blog, active until April 2012. In Naples 1980/81 is still popular among Italian Beatles fans and collectors.

== Personnel ==
- Pasquale "Lino" D'Alessio [originally credited as "Ringo Bar"] - drums, percussion, additional guitar
- Costantino Iaccarino [originally credited as "Paul M'Angart", literally Paul I Go Wrong in Neapolitan] - lead and backing vocals, bass, guitars, keyboards
- Massimo D'Alessio [originally credited as "George Rissone", i.e. George Rowdy] - lead and backing vocals, guitars, keyboards
- Giuseppe "Pino" De Simone [originally credited as "John Lenton" - a reference to Lennon wearing lenses, i.e. glasses] - lead and backing vocals, guitars
- Producer: Giorgio Verdelli
- Arranger and musical director: Vince Tempera

The parodied "Beatles" names only appear within the liner notes on the original vinyl album. They were not repeated in later reissues.

== Discography ==
=== Albums ===
- In Naples 1980/81, EMI 3C-064-18517 (1981; remastered and reissued on CD in 1995 as EMI 0724383606528-I) - CD reissue features a booklet with full lyrics and footnotes explaining the meaning of the most obscure phrases, while none of this was featured in the original vinyl LP.
1. "N'omme 'e niente" (A meaningless man, literally A man of nothing) – parody of "Nowhere Man"
2. "Che guaio sì tu" (What a nuisance are you) – parody of "Please Please Me"
3. "Coccosa’e cchiù" (Something more) – parody/rewrite of "From Me to You"
4. "Si ’e llave tu" (If you wash your hair, literally If you wash it) – parody of "She Loves You"
5. "So’ fesso" (I’m stupid) – parody/rewrite of "No Reply"
6. "Tengh’ ’e guaie" (I’ve got trouble) – parody of "Tell Me Why"
7. "Chist’ è ’o Scià" (This is the Shah, meant as This is the goon) – parody of "Twist and Shout"
8. "Pepp’" (a male name, short for Giuseppe) – parody of "Help!"
9. "Si fosse ’o re" (If I were the king) – rewrite of "Because"
10. "Si scinne abbasce ’o night" (If you come down to the nightclub) – parody of "A Hard Day's Night"
11. "’E zizze" (Tits) – parody of "Day Tripper"

=== 7-inch singles ===
- “She Loves You (Si ‘e llave tu)”, EMI 3C-006-18515 (1981)
- “Ob-La-Di, Ob-La-Da”/“When I Feel Blue”, Cheyenne Records CY 551 (1985)

=== Other appearances ===
Gli italiani cantano i Beatles (Mercury, 1995), compilation album of Beatles cover versions (and parodies) by various Italian artists; Shampoo are featured with “N'omme 'e niente”, i.e. “Nowhere Man”.

== Bibliography ==
- Gino Castaldo, ed. (1990). "Shampoo". Il dizionario della canzone italiana. Rome: Armando Curcio.
