= Codeine Dreaming =

2017 single by Kodak Black featuring Lil Wayne

Single by Kodak Black featuring Lil Wayne

from the album Project Baby 2: All Grown Up and Heart Break Kodak
- Released: November 24, 2017
- Length: 4:24
- Label: Atlantic
- Songwriters: Dieuson Octave; Benjamin Diehl; Marco Rodriguez-Diaz; Ian Lewis; Dwayne Carter
- Producers: Ben Billions; Infamous; Schife

Kodak Black singles chronology
"Halloween" (2017)	"Codeine Dreaming" (2017)	"My Dawg (Remix)" (2017)

Lil Wayne singles chronology
"Like a Man" (2017)	"Codeine Dreaming" (2017)	"Rich Sex" (2018)

"Codeine Dreaming" is a song by the American rapper Kodak Black featuring fellow American rapper Lil Wayne. Released as a single on November 24, 2017, it appears on the deluxe version of the former's fifth mixtape Project Baby 2 (2017) and his seventh mixtape Heart Break Kodak (2018).

== Background and composition ==
Originally, Kodak Black wanted to recruit fellow American rapper Future on the track, as revealed on an Instagram live session.

The song revolves around Kodak and Lil Wayne getting high from codeine and other drugs. It jokes about dreaming and uses metaphors with space and planets. Black rhymes about Uranus, Saturn, Mercury and Neptune and likens himself to the character Jimmy Neutron. Wayne mentions going to Mars at one point.

== Charts ==
=== Weekly charts ===
Chart (2017)	Peak position
Canada Hot 100 (Billboard)	53
Latvia (DigiTop100)	61
US Billboard Hot 100	52
US Hot R&B/Hip-Hop Songs (Billboard)	20

=== Year-end charts ===
Chart (2018)	Position
US Hot R&B/Hip-Hop Songs (Billboard)	84

== Certifications ==
Region	Certification	Certified units/sales
New Zealand (RMNZ)	Gold	15,000^{‡}
United States (RIAA)	3× Platinum	3,000,000^{‡}
^{‡} Sales+streaming figures based on certification alone.
