= There He Go =

Single by Kodak Black

Single by Kodak Black

from the album Painting Pictures
- Released: December 23, 2016
- Length: 3:16
- Label: Dollaz N Dealz
- Songwriters: Dieuson Octave; Aaron Lockhart, Jr.; Damion Williams
- Producers: Dubba-AA; DJ Swift (co.)

Kodak Black singles chronology
"All I Want for Christmas" (2016)	"There He Go" (2016)	"Tunnel Vision" (2017)

Music video
- "There He Go" on YouTube

"There He Go" is a song by American rapper Kodak Black. It was released for free with a music video in December 2016 and was later released as the lead single from his debut studio album Painting Pictures (2017). Produced by Dubba-AA, it is the first song Kodak released after his release from jail in December 2016.

== Background ==
On December 1, 2016, Kodak Black, who had been facing charges of rape and assault, was released from custody after posting a $100,000 bond. Because Kodak remained on house arrest, producer Dubba-AA brought his studio equipment to Kodak's house. They worked on music during the weekend after Kodak's release. The first song Kodak Black released since then was "There He Go", which was considered to be a song celebrating his freedom. It sees him rapping about his "street cred, flashy lifestyle, and love for women".

== Music video ==
The music video was released on December 6, 2016. It was directed by YungMik3 of 20K Visuals and shot in Kodak Black's house. In it, Kodak reunites with his "clique" and shows his wealth through wearing a lot of jewelry, including golden grills.

== Charts ==
Chart (2017)	Peak position
US Bubbling Under Hot 100 (Billboard)	9
US Hot R&B/Hip-Hop Songs (Billboard)	48

== Certifications ==
Region	Certification	Certified units/sales
United States (RIAA)	Platinum	1,000,000^{‡}
^{‡} Sales+streaming figures based on certification alone.
