= Patty Cake (song) =

Song by rapper Kodak Black

Song by Kodak Black

from the album Painting Pictures
- Released: March 31, 2017
- Length: 3:12
- Label: Atlantic; WEA
- Songwriters: Dieuson Octave; Nick Seeley; Benjamin Diehl; Courtney Clyburn
- Producers: Ness; Ben Billions; Nick Seeley

Music video
- "Patty Cake" on YouTube

"Patty Cake" is a song recorded by American rapper Kodak Black. It was released via Atlantic Records on March 31, 2017 as a track in Black's debut studio album Painting Pictures and a music video was released on August 9, 2017. It was described as a "bouncy piano driven track" by Complex Magazine.

== Music video ==
The official music video has received over 92 million views on YouTube as of November 14, 2026. It was directed by Michael Garcia, animated by Kimson Albert, produced by Shiri Fauer and Bruno Biel, and edited by Carlos Gonzalez. (Note: Credits and view statistic adapted from the music video's description on YouTube.)

The video, featuring Black as "an animated cartoon attending a high school", shows students attending school, at where Black appears as a cartoon figure. He appears in the class, standing on a desk in the room while campaigning himself to become the school's homecoming king. At the school dance, Black arrives wearing a red suit and gold chains. There, he goes on the stage to perform his song and eventually becomes the homecoming king. The video ends as Black is crowned and he walks away.

== Personnel ==
- Ness — producer, programmer (Note: Adapted from the credits of Painting Pictures on Tidal.)
- Ben Billions — producer, programmer
- Nick Seeley — co-producer, programmer, songwriter
- Dieuson Octave — primary artist, vocals, songwriter
- Benjamin Diehl — songwriter
- Courtney Clyburn — songwriter

== Charts ==
Chart	Peak position
US Billboard Hot 100	76
US Hot R&B/Hip-Hop Songs (Billboard)	33
US Hot Rap Songs (Billboard)	24

== Certifications ==
Certifications for Patty Cake
Region	Certification	Certified units/sales
United States (RIAA)	2× Platinum	2,000,000^{‡}
^{‡} Sales+streaming figures based on certification alone.
