= Painting Pictures =

Studio album by Kodak Black
- Released: March 31, 2017
- Recorded: 2016–2017
- Studios: Pink House Studios (Miami, Florida)
- Genres: Hip-hop; trap
- Length: 63:26
- Labels: Sniper Gang; Atlantic
- Producers: 30 Roc; Dyryk; Ben Billions; C-Clip Beatz; Charlie Handsome; Cicero; Cubeatz; DannyBoyStyles; Derelle Rideout; DJ Silent Assassin; Dreamlife; D Stackz; Dubba-AA; DY; Go Grizzly; Honorable C.N.O.T.E.; Metro Boomin; Mike Will Made It; Nav; Ness; Nick Seeley; Rex Kudo; Southside; Schife; Wheezy

Kodak Black chronology
| Lil B.I.G. Pac (2016) | Painting Pictures (2017) | Project Baby 2 (2017) |

Singles from Painting Pictures
- 1. "There He Go" Released: December 23, 2016; 2. "Tunnel Vision" Released: February 17, 2017

Painting Pictures is the debut studio album by American rapper Kodak Black. It was released on March 31, 2017, by Dollaz N Dealz Entertainment, Sniper Gang and Atlantic Records. Recording sessions took place from 2016 to 2017, at the Pink House Studios in Miami, Florida, with production provided by Metro Boomin, Southside and Mike Will Made It; as well as guest appearances from Future, Young Thug, Bun B and Jeezy, and A Boogie Wit Da Hoodie.

The mixtape was supported by two singles: "There He Go" and "Tunnel Vision".

== Recording ==
The recording of Painting Pictures began shortly after the rapper's release from detention in December 2016. Following nearly seven months in jail, Kodak returned to his home in Pompano Beach, Florida, where he began creating music while serving a year of house arrest and five years of probation. He initially recorded tracks at his residence with producer Dubba-AA and engineer Nixon using a modest setup, resulting in the release of "There He Go" just days after his release. Two days later, Kodak started working on the album at Pink House Studios in North Miami, a studio owned by producer and engineer Brett Bailey and engineer Lu Diaz, who mixed Painting Pictures. The studio became a frequent workspace for Kodak. Notable contributors to the album included Ben Billions, who produced or co-produced multiple tracks, including "Reminiscing", a collaboration with A Boogie wit da Hoodie. Billions had previously worked with Kodak on tracks such as "Lockjaw" and maintained a collaborative relationship with the rapper throughout the project.

During the recording process, Kodak had to navigate the constraints of house arrest, which required him to obtain permission from his probation officer for each studio session. Despite these restrictions, the recording process for Painting Pictures was intense and fast-paced. Kodak often recorded multiple tracks in a single session, sometimes completing as many as eight or nine songs in one night. Engineer Derek Garcia, who recorded most of the album, noted that Kodak amassed over 50 tracks during the three months of recording, many of which were left off the final album. Garcia and Billions noted that Kodak's drive to create music was evident throughout the process, with the rapper balancing his established street-focused style with a newfound emphasis on creating radio-friendly hits. The sessions also featured high-profile contributions, such as Future, who recorded "Conscience" for the album alongside several unreleased tracks.

== Singles ==
The album's lead single, "There He Go", was released on December 23, 2016, as a celebration of his release from jail. The song was produced by Dubba-AA and DJ Swift.

The album's second single, "Tunnel Vision", was released on February 17, 2017. The song was produced by Metro Boomin, Southside and Cubeatz. The song debuted at number 27, and then later peaked at number six, becoming Kodak's first top 10 hit on the US Billboard Hot 100, and at number 17 on the Canadian Hot 100.

== Commercial performance ==
Painting Pictures debuted at number three on the US Billboard 200, with 71,000 album-equivalent units, of which 51,000 were streaming units and 15,000 were pure album sales in the first week. In its second week the EP dropped to number eight on the chart with 39,000 album-equivalent units. On November 13, 2019, the album was certified platinum by the Recording Industry Association of America (RIAA) for combined sales and album-equivalent units of over a million units in the United States.

== Track listing ==
Painting Pictures track listing
| No. | Title | Writer(s) | Producer(s) | Length |
|---|---|---|---|---|
| 1. | "Day for Day" | Dieuson "Kodak Black" Octave; Benjamin Diehl; Ian Lewis | Ben Billions; Schife | 2:48 |
| 2. | "Coolin and Booted" | Octave; Diehl; Danny Schofield | Ben Billions; DannyBoyStyles | 3:34 |
| 3. | "Candy Paint" (featuring Bun B) | Octave; Bernard Freeman; Kevin Price; Jan Branicki | Go Grizzly; Dreamlife | 3:38 |
| 4. | "Up in Here" | Octave; Rex Kudo; Ryan Vojtesak | Rex Kudo; Charlie Handsome | 2:55 |
| 5. | "U Ain't Never" | Octave; Diehl | Ben Billions | 3:29 |
| 6. | "Twenty 8" | Octave; Daris Meachem | D Stackz | 2:59 |
| 7. | "Patty Cake" | Octave; Diehl; Courtney Clyburn; Nick Seeley | Ben Billions; Ness; Nick Seeley^{[a]} | 3:18 |
| 8. | "Save You" | Octave; Diehl; Navraj Goraya | Ben Billions; Nav | 3:58 |
| 9. | "Conscience" (featuring Future) | Octave; Nayvadius Wilburn; Dwan Avery; Shawn Kyles | DY; Cicero | 3:39 |
| 10. | "Tunnel Vision" | Octave; Leland Wayne; Joshua Luellen; Kevin Gomringer; Tim Gomringer | Metro Boomin; Southside; Cubeatz | 4:28 |
| 11. | "Corrlinks and JPay" | Octave; Michael Williams II; Samuel Gloade | Mike Will Made It; 30 Roc | 3:02 |
| 12. | "Reminiscing" (featuring A Boogie wit da Hoodie) | Octave; Artist Dubose; Diehl; Derek Garcia | Ben Billions; Dyryk | 3:45 |
| 13. | "Side Nigga" | Octave; Jermaine Smith | C-Clip Beatz | 3:29 |
| 14. | "Off the Land" | Octave; Wesley Glass; Kudo | Wheezy; Rex Kudo | 3:45 |
| 15. | "Top Off Benz" (featuring Young Thug) | Octave; Jeffery Williams; Glass | Wheezy | 4:02 |
| 16. | "Feeling Like" (featuring Jeezy) | Octave; Jay "Jeezy" Jenkins; Carlton Mays, Jr. | Honorable C.N.O.T.E.; Derelle Rideout^{[a]} | 3:48 |
| 17. | "Why They Call You Kodak" | Octave; Diehl | Ben Billions | 3:33 |
| 18. | "There He Go" | Octave; Aaron Lockhart, Jr.; Damion Williams | Dubba-AA; DJ Swift^{[a]} | 3:16 |
| Total length: | | | | 63:26 |

Notes

- ^{^[a]} signifies a co-producer
- The original version of "Patty Cake" contained samples from "Assault" from the Final Fantasy X: Piano Collections soundtrack composed by Nobuo Uematsu

== Charts ==
=== Weekly charts ===
| Chart (2017) | Peak position |
|---|---|
| Canadian Albums (Billboard) | 5 |
| Dutch Albums (Album Top 100) | 88 |
| New Zealand Heatseeker Albums (RMNZ) | 4 |
| US Billboard 200 | 3 |
| US Top R&B/Hip-Hop Albums (Billboard) | 2 |

=== Year-end charts ===
| Chart (2017) | Position |
|---|---|
| US Billboard 200 | 48 |
| US Top R&B/Hip-Hop Albums (Billboard) | 22 |

== Certifications ==
Certifications for Painting Pictures
| Region | Certification | Certified units/sales |
|---|---|---|
| United States (RIAA) | 2× Platinum | 2,000,000^{‡} |
^{‡} Sales+streaming figures based on certification alone.
