= Project Baby 2 =

Mixtape by Kodak Black
- Released: August 18, 2017
- Genre: Hip-hop
- Length: 100:22
- Labels: Dollaz N Dealz; Sniper Gang; Atlantic
- Producers: Ben Billions; B HAM; C-Clip Beatz; Cassius Jay; Charlie Handsome; DY; Dyryk; Cubeatz; Frank Dukes; Helluva; Infamous; Leland; London on da Track; MajorNine; Murda Beatz; Ness; Nick da Piff; Plugoz Beatz; Rex Kudo; Schife Karbeen; Skip on da Beat; Taz Taylor; Wheezy

Kodak Black chronology
Painting Pictures (2017)	Project Baby 2 (2017)	Heart Break Kodak (2018)

Project Baby 2 (also called Project Baby 2: All Grown Up on deluxe version) is the fifth mixtape by American rapper Kodak Black. It was released on August 18, 2017, by Dollaz N Dealz, Sniper Gang and Atlantic. It included guest appearances from rappers XXXTentacion, Offset, John Wicks, JackBoy, Birdman, and Lil Wayne.

Music videos were produced for "Transportin'" and "Roll in Peace". Both songs have charted on the US Billboard Hot 100, with "Transportin'" peaking at number 46 and "Roll in Peace" peaking at 31.

== Background ==
The mixtape was released two months after Kodak was released from jail. The cover was shot in Pembroke Pines, Florida, by photographer Ray Yau.

== Critical reception ==
HotNewHipHop rated the album 79% and described it as "complex and confounding".

== Commercial performance ==
Project Baby 2 debuted at number two on the Billboard 200 with 50,000 album equivalent units, including 39,000 streaming equivalent units, and 8,000 being from pure sales. On December 4, 2018, the album was certified platinum by Recording Industry Association of America (RIAA) for combined sales and album-equivalent units of over a million units in the United States.

== Track listing ==
Credits adapted from the album's liner notes and BMI.

No.	Title	Writer(s)	Producer(s)	Length
1.	"Versatile"	Dieuson Octave; Martin McCurtis	Helluva	6:58
2.	"Change My Ways"	Octave; Benjamin Diehl; Khaled Khaled; Krystyana Czeiner; Nicholas Varvatsoulis	Ben Billions; Nick the Piff^{[a]}	3:59
3.	"Roll in Peace" (featuring XXXTentacion)	Octave; Jahseh Onfroy; London Holmes; Kevin Gomringer; Tim Gomringer	London on da Track; Cubeatz^{[a]}	3:33
4.	"6th Sense"	Octave; Holmes; Aubrey Graham; Kevin Richardson; Roark Bailey; Hector Chaparro	London on da Track	3:14
5.	"Don't Wanna Breathe"	Octave; Holmes; Masamune Kudo	London on da Track; Rex Kudo	3:16
6.	"Need a Break"	Octave; Edgar Ferrera; Thomas Klingensmith	SkipOnDaBeat; Leland^{[a]}	4:03
7.	"First Love"	Octave; Derek Garcia	Dyryk	3:08
8.	"Unexplainable"	Octave; Shane Lindstrom; Adam Feeney	Murda Beatz; Frank Dukes	2:30
9.	"My Klik" (featuring JackBoy and John Wicks)	Octave; Danny Snodgrass; Masnick Sainmelus; Pierre Delince	Taz Taylor; PlugOz Beatz^{[a]}	3:25
10.	"Transportin'"	Octave; Jermaine Smith; Isaac Hayes	C-Clip Beatz	2:49
11.	"You Do That Shit"	Octave; Holmes; Joshua Cross	London on da Track; Cassius Jay^{[a]}	2:21
12.	"Built My Legacy" (featuring Offset)	Octave; Kiari Cephus; Lindstrom	Murda Beatz	3:04
13.	"Misunderstood"	Octave; Ferrera	SkipOnDaBeat	3:09
14.	"Pride"	Octave; Diehl; Khaled; Kudo	Ben Billions; Rex Kudo	2:51
15.	"Up Late"	Octave; Ryan Vojtesak; Kudo	Charlie Handsome; Rex Kudo	3:29
16.	"No CoDefendant"	Octave; Diehl; Khaled; Garcia; Andrea Fisher; Czeiner; Varvatsoulis	Ben Billions; Dyryk; Nick the Piff	3:31
17.	"The Recipe"	Octave; Ferrera	SkipOnDaBeat	3:19
18.	"Still in the Streets"	Octave; Smith	C-Clip Beatz	3:20
19.	"Me for Me"	Octave; Chad Thomas	MajorNine	3:52
Total length:				65:51

Project Baby 2: All Grown Up – Deluxe version (bonus tracks)
No.	Title	Writer(s)	Producer(s)	Length
20.	"Codeine Dreaming" (featuring Lil Wayne)	Octave; Diehl; Marco Rodriguez-Diaz; Ian Lewis; Dwayne Carter Jr.	Ben Billions; Infamous; Schife Karbeen	4:23
21.	"No Meds"	Octave; Wesley Glass; Dwan Avery	Wheezy; DY	4:00
22.	"Versatile 2"	Octave; McCurtis	Helluva	9:22
23.	"Cognitive"	Octave; Courtney Clayburn	Ness	3:13
24.	"Projects" (featuring Birdman)	Octave; Bryan Williams; Smith; Garcia	B HAM; C-Clip Beatz; Dyryk^{[a]}	3:40
25.	"Rugrats"	Octave; Smith	C-Clip Beatz	2:59
26.	"Now Time"	Octave; McCurtis	Helluva	3:36
27.	"About You Without You"	Octave; Ferrera	SkipOnDaBeat	3:19
Total length:				100:22

Notes

- ^{^[a]} signifies an uncredited co-producer

Sample credits

- "Transportin'" contains a sample from "Hung Up On My Baby", written and performed by Isaac Hayes

== Personnel ==
Credits adapted from the album's liner notes.

Technical

- Dyryk – recording (all tracks)
- Lu Diaz – mixing (all tracks)
- Chris Athens – mastering (all tracks)

== Charts ==
=== Weekly charts ===
Chart (2017)	Peak position
Canadian Albums (Billboard)	25
US Billboard 200	2
US Top R&B/Hip-Hop Albums (Billboard)	1

=== Year-end charts ===
Chart (2017)	Position
US Billboard 200	118
US Top R&B/Hip-Hop Albums (Billboard)	39
Chart (2018)	Position
US Billboard 200	43
US Top R&B/Hip-Hop Albums (Billboard)	29

== Certifications ==
Certifications for Project Baby 2
Region	Certification	Certified units/sales
New Zealand (RMNZ)	Platinum	15,000^{‡}
United States (RIAA)	2× Platinum	2,000,000^{‡}
^{‡} Sales+streaming figures based on certification alone.
