= Senseless (Kodak Black song) =

2021 single by Kodak Black

Single by Kodak Black
- Released: July 29, 2021
- Length: 2:23
- Label: Sniper Gang; Atlantic
- Songwriters: Bill Kapri; Tyron Douglas
- Producer: Buddah Bless

Kodak Black singles chronology
"Grah Tah Tah" (2021)	"Senseless" (2021)	"Aug 25th" (2021)

Music video
- "Senseless" on YouTube

"Senseless" is a song by American rapper Kodak Black, released as a single on July 29, 2021. Produced by Buddah Bless, it contains an interpolation of "Make No Sense" by YoungBoy Never Broke Again.

== Composition and lyrics ==
Built on "twangy, bluesy Louisiana" production, the song finds Kodak Black rapping about life in the streets during his younger years and his wealthy lifestyle in the present. He delivers nasally through the hook, in which he interpolates "Make No Sense": "I feel like I'm Kodak Black in 2015 / In the 'Vette with plenty killers, mixing molly with the lean / It don't make no sense, I catch a body on the scene".

== Music video ==
The music video was shot by Killer Black and released on July 19, 2021. It sees Kodak Black visiting his hometown of Pompano Beach, Florida, where he hangs out with his crew in different locations around the Golden Acres apartment complex, while wearing jewelry and surrounded by women and expensive cars.

== Charts ==
Chart performance for "Senseless"
Chart (2021)	Peak position
US Bubbling Under Hot 100 (Billboard)	14
US Hot R&B/Hip-Hop Songs (Billboard)	50

== Certifications ==
Certifications for Senseless
Region	Certification	Certified units/sales
United States (RIAA)	Gold	500,000^{‡}
^{‡} Sales+streaming figures based on certification alone.
