= Pistolz & Pearlz =

2023 studio album by Kodak Black

Studio album by Kodak Black
- Released: May 26, 2023
- Genres: Hip-hop; trap
- Length: 66:55
- Labels: Sniper Gang; Atlantic
- Producers: 4EVRSHX; ATL Jacob; AirWay; Ambezza; Ayo B; BRIANxWHITE; Chi Chi; Crater; DJ Cam; Dez Wright; Dr. Zeuz; Dun Deal; Dyryk; DzyOnDaBeat; dvosk; E.C Fresco; Eero Turunen; Fierce; G06 Beatz; Hendrix Smoke; JT Beatz; JulianBeatz; Just Rags; KasimGotJuice; Kuji; L Beats; Mike Will Made It; Oscar Zulu; Pluss; Pooh Beatz; ProdByCTP; Section 8; Shawn E.S.S. Branchedor; Sir Poseidon; TNTXD; TheOnlyDiet; UV Killin Em; VEYIS; Vince Made The Beat; Wallace Jefferson; We Love Heavy

Kodak Black chronology
| Kutthroat Bill: Vol. 1 (2022) | Pistolz & Pearlz (2023) | When I Was Dead (2023) |

Singles from Pistolz & Pearlz
- 1. "No Love for a Thug" Released: April 13, 2023; 2. "Gunsmoke Town" Released: May 25, 2023

Pistolz & Pearlz is the sixth studio album by American rapper Kodak Black. It was released on May 26, 2023, by Atlantic Records and Sniper Gang. The album features guest appearances by VVSNCE, Loe Shimmy, GorditoFlo, EST Gee, Lil Crix, Syko Bob, Wam SpinThaBin and WizDaWizard. The album also features production from Section 8, Chi Chi, Mike Will Made It, ATL Jacob, TNTXD and Dun Deal, among others. The album debuted at number 19 on the US Billboard 200.

The album was supported by two singles: "No Love for a Thug" and "Gunsmoke Town". This album marks as Kodak Black's final album release under the Atlantic Records label imprint.

== Commercial performance ==
On June 10, 2023, Pistolz & Pearlz debuted at number 19 on the US Billboard 200 chart, earning 23,000 album-equivalent units (including 2,000 pure album sales) in its first week, marking Kodak's 11th chart entry. The album also opened at number 6 on the US Top R&B/Hip-Hop Albums chart and opened at number 4 on the US Top Rap Albums, which became Kodak's third top-5 debut, and both his tenth and his ninth entry on both charts overall.

== Track listing ==
Credits adapted from Tidal, Spotify and Genius.

| No. | Title | Writer(s) | Producer(s) | Length |
|---|---|---|---|---|
| 1. | "Pistolz & Pearlz" | Bill Kapri; Micheal Williams II; Asheton Hogan | Mike Will Made It; Pluss | 3:12 |
| 2. | "Roses" (featuring VVSNCE) | Kapri; Essence Davis; Rai'Shaun Williams; Chidi Osondu; Dylan Cleary-Krell; Oscar Zulu | Section 8; Chi Chi; Dez Wright; Zulu | 2:34 |
| 3. | "Get Away" (featuring Loe Shimmy) | Kapri; Shamar Cox; Vincent Anderson | Vince Made The Beat; Shawn E.S.S. Branchedor^{[a]} | 2:56 |
| 4. | "Flirting with Death" (featuring GorditoFlo) | Kapri; Derek Garcia; Jesus Bobe; Ernesto Cornejo | Dyryk; Dr. Zeuz; E.C Fresco^{[b]} | 3:58 |
| 5. | "Dirt McGerk" (featuring EST Gee and Lil Crix) | Kapri; George Stone III; Cristian Denis; Garcia; Bobe; Eero Turunen | Dyryk; Dr. Zeuz; Turunen | 3:53 |
| 6. | "Dope Boy Magic" | Kapri; Bobe; Turunen | Dr. Zeuz; Turunen^{[b]} | 2:17 |
| 7. | "Tryna Figure Why" | Kapri; Lester Williams | L Beats | 3:28 |
| 8. | "Follow Me" | Kapri; Thomas Horton; Airway; Daniel Voskoboynik | TNTXD; AirWay^{[b]}; dvosk^{[b]} | 3:00 |
| 9. | "Murder Mystery" | Kapri; Bobe; Andrew O'Brien; Nicholas Solis | Dr. Zeuz; Ayo B | 2:41 |
| 10. | "Church on Saturday" (featuring Syko Bob, Wam SpinThaBin and WizDaWizard) | Kapri; Cambrell Smart; Wisdom Williams; Cambrell Smart; Timothy Wright; Cornejo; Bobe; Justin Ragbeer; O'Brien | Dr. Zeuz; Just Rags; Ayo B^{[b]} | 3:40 |
| 11. | "Beretta Love" | Kapri; Jacob Canady; Derrick Miller; Ofer Shaul Ishai | ATL Jacob; Hendrix Smoke; Kuji | 4:01 |
| 12. | "X&O's" | Kapri; Bobe; O'Brien; Christopher Latimer | Dr. Zeuz; Ayo B; ProdByCTP | 3:00 |
| 13. | "Die Today" | Kapri; Matthew Liyew; Amir Sims; Veyis-Can Urun | Ambezza; Fierce; VEYIS | 2:26 |
| 14. | "Gunsmoke Town" | Kapri; David Cunningham; Darryl Clemons; Sir Poseidon | Dun Deal; Pooh Beatz; Sir Poseidon | 2:54 |
| 15. | "That for Real" | Kapri; Camron Amedee; James Therrien; Anton Ingvarsson | DJ Cam; JT Beatz; We Love Heavy | 2:26 |
| 16. | "A Beautiful Rainbow" | Kapri; Bobe; Cornejo; Franklin Thompson; Larry Dodson; Winston Stewart; Michard Beard; Allen Jones; Charles Allen; Harvey Henderson; James Alexander; Lloyd Smith | Dr. Zeuz; E.C Fresco | 2:15 |
| 17. | "Snipers and Robbers" | Kapri; Anthony Howard; Kasim Walker; Yuval Chain | DzyOnDaBeat; KasimGotJuice; UV Killin Em | 2:18 |
| 18. | "Balance" | Kapri; Shamika Laksan Alahakoon; Brian White; Julian Bohorquez; Jason Silber | 4EVRSHX; BRIANxWHITE; JulianBeatz; TheOnlyDiet | 2:31 |
| 19. | "No Love for a Thug" | Kapri; Williams | L Beats | 5:05 |
| 20. | "Stay" | Kapri; Park MinGeon; Nathaniel Hill Kim; William Boyette | G06 Beatz; Crater | 4:28 |
| 21. | "Down with You" | Kapri; Bobe; Cornejo; Wallace Jefferson | Dr. Zeuz; E.C Fresco; Jefferson | 3:41 |
| Total length: | | | | 66:55 |

=== Notes ===
- ^{[a]} signifies an uncredited co-producer.
- ^{[b]} signifies an additional producer.
- ^{[c]} signifies a co-producer.

== Personnel ==
Credits adapted from Tidal.

Performers

- Kodak Black – primary artist
- VVSNCE – featured artist (track 2)
- Loe Shimmy – featured artist (track 3)
- GorditoFlo – featured artist (track 4)
- EST Gee – featured artist (track 5)
- Lil Crix – featured artist (track 5)
- Syko Bob – featured artist (track 10)
- Wam SpinTheBin – featured artist (track 10)
- WizDaWizard – featured artist (track 10)

Musicians

- Eero Turunen – keyboards (tracks 5 and 6)
- Ayo B – keyboards (track 10)

Technical

- Chris Athens – masterer
- Andrew Rodriguez – assistant engineer (track 1 and 3)
- Jordan Giordano – assistant engineer (tracks 2 and 5)
- Derek "Dyryk" Garcia – mixer (tracks 2–21)
- Christian Macias – additional vocal recording (track 4)
- Hiram Shulterbrandt – assistant engineer (track 4)
- Adam Moralejo – assistant engineer (track 6)
- Caro Orjuela – assistant engineer (track 7)
- Rangle Lopez – assistant engineer (track 8)
- Liam Eagan – assistant engineer (track 9)
- Charles Reese – assistant engineer (track 11, 14)
- Brett Bailey – assistant engineer (track 12)
- Jojo Vandalkidd – assistant engineer (track 13)
- Russel Pochop – assistant engineer (track 15)
- Kiara Moreno – assistant engineer (track 16)
- Richard Preval – assistant engineer (track 17 and 18)
- Davidson Octave – assistant engineer (track 19)
- Fabian Marasciullo – mixer (track 19)
- Kat Hicks – assistant engineer (track 20)
- Arnold Gutierrez – assistant engineer (track 21)

== Charts ==
Chart performance for Pistolz & Pearlz
| Chart (2023) | Peak position |
|---|---|
| US Billboard 200 | 19 |
| US Top R&B/Hip-Hop Albums (Billboard) | 6 |
| US Top Rap Albums (Billboard) | 4 |
