= Feelin' Peachy =

2021 single by Kodak Black

Single by Kodak Black

from the EP Happy Birthday Kodak
- Released: June 11, 2021
- Length: 3:11
- Label: Sniper Gang; Atlantic
- Songwriters: Bill Kapri; Derek Garcia; Niles Groce; Francis Varela; Michal Marek; Nicholas Varvatsoulis
- Producers: Dyryk; Snapz; Santo; Ricx

Kodak Black singles chronology
"Rip Stick" (2021)	"Feelin' Peachy" (2021)	"Falling Over" (2021)

Music video
- "Feelin' Peachy" on YouTube

"Feelin' Peachy" is a song by American rapper Kodak Black, released on June 11, 2021 (his 24th birthday) as a single from his EP Happy Birthday Kodak, which was released on the same day. It was produced by Dyryk, Snapz, Santo and Ricx. The song sees Kodak Black rapping about the luxury in his life.

== Music video ==
The music video was released alongside the song. Directed by Damian Fyffe, it shows Black enjoying himself and dancing at a tropical resort, in the company of women.

=== Controversy ===
The clip gained attention for featuring two particular video vixens that resemble twin models Shannon and Shannade Clermont. The duo addressed this on Instagram in disapproval: "Nah whew lmao if we wasn't in the budget just say that. It's getting weird. What you bought vs. what you get. Or is it what you want vs. what you can afford?"

== Charts ==
Chart performance for "Feelin' Peachy"
Chart (2021)	Peak position
US Bubbling Under Hot 100 (Billboard)	9

== Certifications ==
Certifications for Feelin' Peachy
Region	Certification	Certified units/sales
United States (RIAA)	Platinum	1,000,000^{‡}
^{‡} Sales+streaming figures based on certification alone.
