= Tunnel Vision (Kodak Black song) =

2017 single by Kodak Black

Single by Kodak Black

from the album Painting Pictures
- Released: February 16, 2017
- Recorded: 2016
- Genre: Hip-hop; trap
- Length: 4:28
- Label: Dollaz N Dealz; Sniper Gang; Atlantic
- Songwriters: Dieuson Octave; Leland Wayne; Joshua Luellen; Kevin Gomringer; Tim Gomringer
- Producers: Metro Boomin; Southside; Cubeatz

Kodak Black singles chronology
"There He Go" (2016)	"Tunnel Vision" (2017)	"Drowning" (2017)

Music video
- "Tunnel Vision" on YouTube

"Tunnel Vision" is a song by American rapper Kodak Black, released on February 17, 2017 by Dollaz N Dealz Entertainment, Sniper Gang, and Atlantic Records as the second single from his debut album, Painting Pictures (2017). Produced by Metro Boomin, Southside, and Cubeatz, the track peaked at number six on the US Billboard Hot 100. The track samples the song "El Aparecido" by Inti-Illimani, a Chilean folk band, part of the Nueva canción movement.

== Background ==
Kodak Black was released from a jail in South Carolina on bail following a rape case which he was accused of, a couple weeks prior to the recording of the song. Kodak Black released a preview of the song on his Instagram account when he was in the studio with Metro Boomin in Miami, Florida, and it gained millions of plays before its official release two months after.

== Music video ==
A still from the music video for the song, in which Kodak Black is seen in front of a burning cross.

The song's accompanying music video premiered a day before the song was released as single, on February 16, 2017, on Kodak Black's YouTube account. The music video currently has over 300 million views. In the video, a white man wearing a "Make America Hate Again" hat is seen attempting to shoot a black man working at a field before wrestling him. In one scene of the video, Kodak Black is seen performing in front of burning crosses containing hung klansmen. Matthew Pulver of Salon compared the song's music video to Snoop Dogg's "Lavender (Nightfall Remix)" music video. Pulver praised Kodak's video, writing, "The Jim Crow-era imagery combines with slave-era servitude and contemporary Trumpism to construct a critique of the current crisis that stretches through generations to link it to the centuries-long national history of anti-black violence and oppression."

== Commercial performance ==
"Tunnel Vision" debuted at number 27 on US Billboard Hot 100 for the chart dated March 12, 2017. The following week, it entered the top 10, moving up to number eight; it has since peaked at number six. It is Kodak Black's first top 10 single. In March 2017, the song was certified Gold by the Recording Industry Association of America (RIAA) for earning 500,000 equivalent units in the United States, a month and a half after its initial release. On June 30, 2017, "Tunnel Vision" was certified as double platinum by the RIAA.

== Lyrical references ==
Kodak Black played the original recording of the full song at some of his concerts, which included the following lyrics:

I jumped out of that Wraith, Kodak bought a Wraith
I get any girl I want, I don't gotta rape

This was a reference to Kodak Black's pending criminal charges of rape in South Carolina. The reference was removed in the final version of the song.

Other references to Kodak Black's legal troubles include the lyric: "Lil' Kodak they don't wanna see you winnin', they just wanna see you in the penitentiary."

== Charts ==
=== Weekly charts ===
Chart (2017)	Peak position
Canada Hot 100 (Billboard)	17
UK Hip Hop/R&B (Official Charts)	31
UK Streaming (Official Charts)	80
US Billboard Hot 100	6
US Hot R&B/Hip-Hop Songs (Billboard)	4
US Rhythmic Airplay (Billboard)	24

=== Year-end charts ===
Chart (2017)	Position
Canada (Canadian Hot 100)	81
US Billboard Hot 100	55
US Hot R&B/Hip-Hop Songs (Billboard)	26

== Certifications ==
Region	Certification	Certified units/sales
Denmark (IFPI Danmark)	Gold	45,000^{‡}
France (SNEP)	Gold	100,000^{‡}
New Zealand (RMNZ)	Platinum	30,000^{‡}
United Kingdom (BPI)	Gold	400,000^{‡}
United States (RIAA)	9× Platinum	9,000,000^{‡}
^{‡} Sales+streaming figures based on certification alone.
