= Pills & Automobiles =

Single by Chris Brown featuring Yo Gotti, A Boogie wit da Hoodie and Kodak Black

from the album Heartbreak on a Full Moon
- Released: August 4, 2017
- Recorded: June 2017
- Studio: Quad (New York City)
- Genre: Trap
- Length: 4:52
- Label: RCA
- Songwriters: Chris Brown; Julius Dubose; Dieuson Octave; Mario Mims
- Producers: OG Parker; The Martianz; Smash David

Chris Brown singles chronology
"Pie" (2017)	"Pills & Automobiles" (2017)	"Questions" (2017)

Yo Gotti singles chronology
"Rake It Up" (2017)	"Pills & Automobiles" (2017)	"Juice" (2017)

A Boogie Wit da Hoodie singles chronology
"Horses" (2017)	"Pills & Automobiles" (2017)	"Beast Mode" (2017)

Kodak Black singles chronology
"First Day Out" (2017)	"Pills & Automobiles" (2017)	"Halloween" (2017)

Music video
- "Pills & Automobiles" on YouTube

"Pills & Automobiles" is a song written and performed by American singer Chris Brown featuring American rappers Yo Gotti, A Boogie wit da Hoodie, and Kodak Black. Production was handled by OG Parker, The Martianz and Smash David. The song was released through RCA Records on August 4, 2017, as the fourth single from Brown's eighth studio album, Heartbreak on a Full Moon (2017).

"Pills & Automobiles" received positive reviews from music critics, who complimented the song's catchiness and production, noting it as a departure from Brown’s standard R&B style, applying his skills to trap music. In the United States, "Pills & Automobiles" reached number 16 on the Hot R&B/Hip-Hop Songs chart, and number 46 on the Billboard Hot 100 chart, and was certified triple platinum by the Recording Industry Association of America (RIAA). Its music video, shot at Splash Kingdom Waterpark, in California, was released on August 25, 2017, and displays a large pool party, where Brown and his crew perform choreographed dances.

== Background and recording ==
On May 2, 2017, Chris Brown announced the initial Heartbreak on a Full Moon tracklist, and the song was not among the 40 songs announced, but the album's release was later postponed. On June 11, 2017, following their performance at "HOT 97 Summer Jam 2017", a concert organized by American radio Hot 97, Brown and A Boogie wit da Hoodie composed and recorded the song that night at Quad Studios, in New York City, over a production by OG Parker, The Martianz and Smash David.

In July 2017, Brown announced the upcoming release of singles from his album, then releasing "Pills & Automobiles" and "Questions" on August 4, and August 16, respectively.

== Composition and lyrics ==
"Pills & Automobiles" is a trap up-tempo song, that runs for 4 minutes and 52 seconds, produced by OG Parker, The Martianz and Smash David. The song features guest appearances by American rappers Yo Gotti, A Boogie wit da Hoodie, and Kodak Black. Each artist on the track performs one verse, with Brown doing a chorus that starts with the repetition of the word "wet", and ends alternating ad-libs with a mumbled "I'm just tryna change your life". Brown's voice on the track is edited with Auto-Tune, making it sound "ghosty" in his rapped verse, according to Brad Wete of Billboard. In the song, the artists talk about their relationship with reckless women.

== Critical reception ==
Writing for Billboard, Nerisha Penrose said that Brown's "vocals are bathed in Auto-Tune as he sings about getting high and having multiple women" and "leads into the song's catchy hook". According to Lindsey India of XXL, the track features Brown "in his trap music element, spitting some catchy, melodic rhymes over a candy-synthed club-friendly beat", and felt "Gotti comes in with a signature verse of his own, while A Boogie and Kodak provide some of their own crooning towards the end". Complex reviewers compared the track to works by rapper Travis Scott.

== Music video ==
The accompanying music video was released on August 25, 2017. It was directed by Chris Brown, and filmed in Splash Kingdom Waterpark, in California, where the visual for Justin Bieber's 2012 song "Beauty and a Beat" was also filmed. The video shows Brown and his dancers executing complex choreographies in a shallow pool, intercut with scenes of women twerking. Yo Gotti appears on the poolside, being surrounded by women. A Boogie is in the pool, sitting on an inflatable float and holding a water gun as he raps, while Kodak Black, due to his house arrest at the time, was filmed in a different scenario, riding a dirt bike and posing in front of a luxurious orange car with half-naked women by his side. "No one knew it was shot and that Chris Brown was on site that day," said Pamela Kennedy, a representative for park owners. "We understand the importance, especially for videographers and artists, to provide a suitable environment to shoot and do their craft."

== Track listing ==
- Digital download
1. "Pills & Automobiles" (featuring Yo Gotti, A Boogie wit da Hoodie and Kodak Black) – 4:52

== Charts ==
=== Weekly charts ===
Weekly chart performance for "Pills & Automobiles"
Chart (2017–18)	Peak position
Canada Hot 100 (Billboard)	67
France (SNEP)	136
US Billboard Hot 100	46
US Hot R&B/Hip-Hop Songs (Billboard)	16
US R&B/Hip-Hop Airplay (Billboard)	6
US Rhythmic Airplay (Billboard)	25

=== Year-end charts ===
2017 year-end chart performance for "Pills & Automobiles"
Chart (2017)	Position
US Hot R&B Songs (Billboard)	27
US Hot R&B/Hip-Hop Songs (Billboard)	91

2018 year-end chart performance for "Pills & Automobiles"
Chart (2018)	Position
US Hot R&B Songs (Billboard)	20
US Hot R&B/Hip-Hop Songs (Billboard)	79
US R&B/Hip-Hop Airplay (Billboard)	32

== Certifications ==
Certifications for "Pills & Automobiles"
Region	Certification	Certified units/sales
Australia (ARIA)	Platinum	70,000^{‡}
New Zealand (RMNZ)	Platinum	30,000^{‡}
United Kingdom (BPI)	Silver	200,000^{‡}
United States (RIAA)	3× Platinum	3,000,000^{‡}
^{‡} Sales+streaming figures based on certification alone.
