= MoshPit (song) =

2018 song by Kodak Black featuring Juice Wrld

Promotional single by Kodak Black featuring Juice Wrld

from the album Dying to Live
- Released: December 12, 2018
- Length: 2:44
- Label: Atlantic
- Songwriters: Bill Kapri; Jarad Higgins; Christopher Gibbs; Edgar Ferrera
- Producers: Natra Average; SkipOnDaBeat

"MoshPit" is a song by American rapper Kodak Black, released on December 12, 2018 as the second promotional single from his debut studio album Dying to Live (2018). Featuring American rapper Juice Wrld, it was produced by Natra Average and SkipOnDaBeat.

== Composition and lyrics ==
The song finds the rappers melodically rapping about wanting to start a moshpit; Kodak Black suggests stomping in Louboutin red bottoms. The first verse is performed by Juice Wrld in Auto-Tuned vocals, while the second and final verse is performed by Kodak Black, who references the song "Tom Ford" by Jay-Z ("I be rocking Tom Ford, popping Molly though") and sings about moshing at the Staples Center.

== Critical reception ==
Dayna Haffenden of XXL gave a positive review, commenting the rappers "spit effortlessly" and that Juice Wrld "shows off his skills" in his verse. Other music critics were less favorable; Maxwell Cavaseno of HotNewHipHop wrote the song "consists of forgettable production and a Juice WRLD feature you could've easily mistaken as a miscredited Post Malone verse." Daniel Spielberger of HipHopDX considered Juice Wrld's appearance "slightly better" than the other guest features Dying to Live, "but unnecessary nonetheless."

== Charts ==
Chart (2018)	Peak position
Canada Hot 100 (Billboard)	81
New Zealand Hot Singles (RMNZ)	9
US Billboard Hot 100	58
US Hot R&B/Hip-Hop Songs (Billboard)	19

== Certifications ==
Region	Certification	Certified units/sales
United States (RIAA)	Platinum	1,000,000^{‡}
^{‡} Sales+streaming figures based on certification alone.
