= If I'm Lyin, I'm Flyin =

Single by Kodak Black

Single by Kodak Black

from the album Dying to Live
- Released: September 28, 2018
- Genre: Gangsta rap
- Length: 2:10
- Label: Atlantic
- Songwriters: Bill Kapri; Benjamin Diehl; Harold Thomas; Lee Jones
- Producer: Ben Billions

Kodak Black singles chronology
"Wake Up in the Sky" (2018)	"If I'm Lyin, I'm Flyin" (2018)	"Zeze" (2018)

Music video
- "If I'm Lyin, I'm Flyin" on YouTube

"If I'm Lyin, I'm Flyin" is a song by American rapper Kodak Black. It was released on September 28, 2018, as the lead single from his debut studio album Dying to Live (2018).

== Composition ==
The song finds Kodak Black rapping about his life from being on the streets and in jail to becoming a successful rapper ("I can't let these niggas knock me off my pivot / God sat me down and talked to me I listened"), and "ruminates on his fallen homies" as well.

== Critical reception ==
Patrick Montes of Hypebeast wrote that the song "pairs his unique, charismatic flows with syrupy, bass-heavy melodies."

== Music video ==
An accompanying music video was released with the single. Directed by Spencer Hord, the video shows Kodak Black enjoying his freedom after his release from jail, flying on a private jet and reuniting with family.

== Charts ==
Chart (2018)	Peak position
Canada Hot 100 (Billboard)	68
US Billboard Hot 100	56
US Hot R&B/Hip-Hop Songs (Billboard)	32
