= Testimony (Kodak Black song) =

2018 song by Kodak Black

Promotional single by Kodak Black

from the album Dying to Live
- Released: December 7, 2018
- Length: 4:00
- Label: Atlantic
- Songwriters: Bill Kapri; Chad Thomas
- Producer: Major Nine

Music video
- "Testimony" on YouTube

"Testimony" is a song by American rapper Kodak Black, released on December 8, 2018 as the first promotional single from his debut studio album Dying to Live (2018). It was produced by Major Nine.

== Composition and lyrics ==
Kodak Black raps over a "minimal, atmospheric beat". Portraying himself as a messenger of God with lyrics centered on spirituality, he reflects on overcoming obstacles such as his inner demons, drug abuse ("I don't drink no lean, I'm sippin' on holy water like this my medicine / I'm a livin' testimony, every album like a testament / Everything I went through made me who I am 'cause he be testin' me / So I'm breakin' bread with all my fam 'cause I don't take no ecstasy") and his dark past ("Shot a nigga, took a shower with the bleach, Yahweh / Mama, I fell victim to the streets, I'm sorry / I'm in middle school sellin' weed in the hallway").

== Critical reception ==
Ammar Kalia of The Guardian criticized the song, writing "Black himself is awaiting trial for alleged rape but takes a preachy tone on Testimony, rapping that he is 'God-sent … to relay these messages'. It's a misfire: Black doesn't have the novelty or innovation that has foisted this scene to prominence."

== Music video ==
The music video was released on December 10, 2018. It sees Kodak Black walking throughout a church, with shots of glass windows, crosses and gold jewelry. At the end of the clip, he is also baptized.

== Live performances ==
Kodak Black performed the song on Jimmy Kimmel Live! on December 17, 2018.

== Remix ==
American rapper Lil Durk released a remix to the song titled "Chiraqimony" on February 11, 2019.

== Charts ==
Chart (2018)	Peak position
US Billboard Hot 100	74
US Hot R&B/Hip-Hop Songs (Billboard)	27

== Certifications ==
Region	Certification	Certified units/sales
United States (RIAA)	Platinum	1,000,000^{‡}
^{‡} Sales+streaming figures based on certification alone.
