= Transportin' =

Song by Kodak Black

from the album Project Baby 2
- Released: August 18, 2017
- Recorded: 2017
- Length: 2:49
- Label: Atlantic; WEA
- Songwriters: Dieuson Octave; Jermaine Smith; Isaac Hayes
- Producer: C-ClipBeatz

Music video
- "Transportin'" on YouTube

"Transportin'" is a song recorded by American rapper Kodak Black. It was released on August 18, 2017, via Atlantic Records and WEA. Produced by C-ClipBeatz, the song was included on Black's fifth mixtape Project Baby 2 with songwriting credits from Black, Jermaine Smith and Isaac Hayes.

== Background ==
The song samples Isaac Hayes' "Hung Up on My Baby".

== Music video ==
The music video was filmed and directed by Sniper gang film, with personnel including YungMik3 (also known as 20K), Wavylord and Kodak Black. (Note: Music video credits adapted from the description on its YouTube page.) It shows Black in scenes at his house and studio, moving around in a racing jacket with a black and orange bulletproof vest, as Lamborghini and Audi vehicles are featured. Rap-Up notes that in the video Black "counts his money, plays on his iPad, and answers text messages, before heading outside." The video proceeds as Black's orange vehicles were shown on display outside of his driveway.

== Personnel ==
- Dieuson Octave — primary artist, songwriter (Note: Personnel credits adapted from the liner notes of Project Baby 2 and BMI.)
- Jermaine Smith — songwriter
- Isaac Hayes — songwriter
- C-Clip Beatz — producer

== Charts ==
=== Weekly charts ===
Chart (2017)	Peak position
Canada Hot 100 (Billboard)	52
US Billboard Hot 100	46
US Hot R&B/Hip-Hop Songs (Billboard)	18

=== Year-end charts ===
Chart (2017)	Position
US Hot R&B/Hip-Hop Songs (Billboard)	84

== Certifications ==
Region	Certification	Certified units/sales
New Zealand (RMNZ)	Platinum	30,000^{‡}
United Kingdom (BPI)	Silver	200,000^{‡}
United States (RIAA)	6× Platinum	6,000,000^{‡}
^{‡} Sales+streaming figures based on certification alone.
