= When I Was Dead =

Studio album by Kodak Black
- Released: November 10, 2023
- Genre: Hip-hop; trap
- Length: 55:13
- Label: Sniper Gang; Capitol
- Producer: Ayo B; Boi-1da; CeewieCrash; Chris Soper; James Craft; Dr. Zeuz; Dyryk; DzyOnDaBeat; Earl on the Beat; Ging; J Gramm; KasimGotJuice; Jay Knight; L Beats; Major Nine; Max Perry; Metro Boomin; Nash; Nick the Piff; Okami; RBP; Allen Ritter; Schife Karbeen; Jesse Singer; Snapz; Brian Stanley; SupaManley; TayMasterChef; Wylo; YodaYae1K

Kodak Black chronology
Pistolz & Pearlz (2023)	When I Was Dead (2023)	Dieuson Octave (2024)

Singles from When I Was Dead
- 1. "Eaze Your Mind" Released: October 27, 2023; 2. "2'Cy" Released: October 31, 2023

When I Was Dead is the seventh studio album by American rapper Kodak Black. It was released as a surprise album on November 10, 2023, by Sniper Gang, distributed by Capitol Records. The album features guest appearances from WizDaWizard, Wam SpinThaBin, and OG Bobby Billions, meanwhile production on the album was handled by Metro Boomin, Boi-1da, Allen Ritter, J Gramm, Earl on the Beat, Dyryk, Ayo B and Dr. Zeuz, among others. The album was supported by two singles: "Eaze Your Mind" and "2'Cy".

When I Was Dead serves as a follow-up to his previous sixth studio album Pistolz & Pearlz (2023), which was released on May 26, 2023, five months prior, and it its Kodak Black's second album of 2023. It is Kodak's first studio project with Capitol Records (under the umbrella of Universal Music Group) since signing with the label in October 2022, following the completion of his contract with Atlantic Records earlier that year.

== Release and promotion ==
=== Singles ===
On October 13, 2023, Kodak Black released a song, "Hope You Know". The song was produced by L Beats. The song was not included on the album. Meanwhile, the music video for the song was released on October 4, 2023, a week before the single was released on streaming platforms.

The first and lead single from the album, "Eaze Your Mind", was released on October 27, 2023. The song's accompanying music video was released on the same day as the single's release. The song was produced by Dr. Zeuz and Nash.

The second single from the album, "2'Cy", was released on October 31, 2023, on Halloween. The song was produced by CeeweeCrash and was co-produced by Cosmic.

=== Music videos ===
The music video, "Lemme See" was released on November 10, 2023, on the same day after the album was released.

== Track listing ==
When I Was Dead track listing
No.	Title	Writer(s)	Producer(s)	Length
1.	"Kylie Grande"	Bill K. Kapri; Leland Wayne; Adam Feeney	Metro Boomin; Allen Ritter; Ging	3:12
2.	"Close to Me"	Kapri; Jesus Bobe; Andrew O'Brien	Dr. Zeuz; Ayo B	2:11
3.	"I'm Kodak"	Kapri; Latavius Driver; Anthony Howard; Sean Piatt; Brian Stanley; Jesse Singer; Chris Soper	TayMasterChef; DzyOnDaBeat; YodaYae1K; Stanley; Singer; Soper	2:08
4.	"Hard Life"	Kapri; Lester Williams	L Beats	3:28
5.	"Burning Rubber"	Kapri; Matthew Samuels	Boi-1da	2:43
6.	"Lemme See"	Kapri; Ian Lewis; Derek Garcia; Alexander Buthune	Schife Karbeen	2:45
7.	"2'Cy"	Kapri; Dmitriy Balashov	CeewieCrash; Cosmic^{[a]}	2:59
8.	"Nothing to Me"	Kapri; Garcia; Russell Pochop; Max Field Perry; Cos Pachina	Dyryk; RBP; Perry; Cozmo the Great^{[b]}	2:36
9.	"Came Thru Flushin'"	Kapri; Wayne; Ritter; Feeney	Metro Boomin; Ritter; Ging	3:34
10.	"Eaze Your Mind"	Kapri; Bobe; Nathan Lamarche; Garcia	Dr. Zeuz; Nash	3:11
11.	"Fuck You Too"	Kapri; Garcia; Pochop; Perry; Devin Phillion; Casoz	Dyryk; RBP; Perry; UV Killin Em^{[b]}; Casoz^{[b]}	3:26
12.	"Colostomy" (featuring WizDaWizard)	Kapri; Garcia; Cedric Leutwyler; Wisdom Williams	Dyryk; Wylo	2:22
13.	"Extra Clips" (featuring Wam SpinThaBin and WizDaWizard)	Kapri; Williams; Cambrell Smart; Williams	L Beats	3:56
14.	"Scared of My Money"	Kapri; Williams	L Beats	2:13
15.	"Right on Time"	Kapri; Issac Bynum; Julian Gramma	Earl on the Beat; J Gramm	2:26
16.	"Facetime Hiding"	Kapri; Kasim Ali Walker	KasimGotJuice	2:04
17.	"My Chest Out"	Kapri; Garcia; Nicholas Varvatsoulis; Niles Groce; Ishmael Hurst; Matthew James	Dyryk; Nick The Piff; Snapz; Okami; James Craft	2:21
18.	"Master Peace" (featuring OG Bobby Billions)	Kapri; Chad Thomas; Matthew Johnson; Manley Nwosu	Major Nine; Jay Knight; SupaManley	3:50
19.	"Hope You Know"	Kapri; Williams	L Beats	3:47
Total length:				55:13

=== Notes ===
- ^{^[a]} signifies a co-producer
- ^{^[b]} signifies an additional producer
- "2'Cy" is stylized as "2'CY"

== Charts ==
Chart performance for When I Was Dead
Chart (2023)	Peak position
US Billboard 200	74
US Top R&B/Hip-Hop Albums (Billboard)	27
