= Halloween (Kodak Black song) =

2017 single by Kodak Black

Single by Kodak Black
- Released: October 31, 2017
- Genre: Hip hop; trap
- Length: 3:22
- Label: Atlantic
- Songwriters: Dieuson Octave; Ryan Vojtesak; Masamune Kudo
- Producers: Charlie Handsome; Rex Kudo

Kodak Black singles chronology
"Pills & Automobiles" (2017)	"Halloween" (2017)	"Codeine Dreaming" (2017)

Music video
- "Halloween" on YouTube

"Halloween" is a song by American rapper Kodak Black, released on October 31, 2017 along with a music video directed by Be El Be. It was produced by Charlie Handsome and Rex Kudo.

== Composition ==
The song finds Kodak Black melodically rapping. In the lyrics, he states that he should have been born on Halloween because of his evil deeds, reflects on his childhood and growing up with an absent father, and mentions his prolific streak in releasing albums. Black references several Halloween elements, such as the Devil, demons, costumes (while referring to himself as a wolf in sheep's clothing) and trick or treating. He later explains why he thinks his "cranium got a disease".

== Critical reception ==
Kevin Goddard of HotNewHipHop gave a favorable review, writing "Highlighted by its infectious production & catchy flow & delivery, 'Halloween' is another strong addition to Kodak's steady growing catalogue of hits."

== Charts ==
Chart (2017)	Peak position
US Bubbling Under Hot 100 (Billboard)	2
US Hot R&B/Hip-Hop Songs (Billboard)	45

== Certifications ==
Certifications for Halloween
Region	Certification	Certified units/sales
United States (RIAA)	Gold	500,000^{‡}
^{‡} Sales+streaming figures based on certification alone.
