= Roll in Peace =

- T-Pain remix artwork

Song by Kodak Black featuring XXXTentacion

from the album Project Baby 2
- Released: August 18, 2017
- Length: 3:33
- Label: Dollaz N Dealz; Sniper Gang; Atlantic
- Songwriters: Dieuson Octave; Jahseh Onfroy; London Holmes; Tim Gomringer; Kevin Gomringer
- Producers: London on da Track; Cubeatz

Music video
- "Roll in Peace" on YouTube

"Roll in Peace" is a song by American rapper Kodak Black featuring fellow American rapper and singer XXXTentacion, released as a track on his fifth mixtape Project Baby 2 (2017). It was sent to rhythmic radio on August 18, 2017, by Dollaz N Dealz Entertainment, Sniper Gang, and Atlantic Records. The track was written by the artists themselves alongside its producers London on da Track & Cubeatz.

== Music video ==
The song's accompanying music video premiered on January 15, 2018, on Kodak Black's YouTube account. The video, created with help from AWGE, opens with a mannequin dressed like a police officer at a court hearing, progressing to Kodak rapping in the courtroom and later a church dressed in an orange prison jumpsuit. XXXTentacion did not appear in the video, instead providing a voiceover before his verse asking his fans to come and support him during his then upcoming court hearing.

== Commercial performance ==
"Roll in Peace" debuted at number 53 on US Billboard Hot 100 for the chart dated September 9, 2017. The song then later peaked at number 31 on the US Billboard Hot 100 for the chart dated February 3, 2018. It spent 26 weeks on the chart before falling out on the chart dated March 3, 2018. The song is Kodak Black's third top 40 song and his fourth highest-charting song. In February 2018, the song was certified Platinum by the Recording Industry Association of America (RIAA) for earning 1,000,000 equivalent units in the United States.

== Remixes ==
Several remixes of the song have been released by artists such as Migos, Gucci Mane, Travis Scott, Lil Wayne, Nasty C, Remy Ma Layton Greene and T-Pain. An "Aussie Mix" version was also created by Australian rappers ChillinIt and Wombat.

== Charts ==
=== Weekly charts ===
Weekly chart performance
Chart (2017–18)	Peak position
Canada Hot 100 (Billboard)	64
US Billboard Hot 100	31
US Hot R&B/Hip-Hop Songs (Billboard)	16
US Rhythmic Airplay (Billboard)	31

=== Year-end charts ===
Annual chart rankings
Chart (2017)	Position
US Hot R&B/Hip-Hop Songs (Billboard)	72
Chart (2018)	Position
US Hot R&B/Hip-Hop Songs (Billboard)	65
US Streaming Songs (Billboard)	49

== Certifications ==
Region	Certification	Certified units/sales
New Zealand (RMNZ)	Platinum	30,000^{‡}
United Kingdom (BPI)	Silver	200,000^{‡}
United States (RIAA)	9× Platinum	9,000,000^{‡}
^{‡} Sales+streaming figures based on certification alone.
