= Shampoo (Kodak Black song) =

2024 single by Kodak Black

Single by Kodak Black
- Released: February 23, 2024
- Genre: Trap
- Length: 2:11
- Label: Vulture Love; Capitol
- Songwriters: Bill Kapri; Anthony Howard; Derek Garcia
- Producers: DzyOnDaBeat; Dyryk

Kodak Black singles chronology
"Lemme See" (2023)	"Shampoo" (2024)

Music video
- "Shampoo" on YouTube

"Shampoo" is a single by American rapper Kodak Black, released on February 23, 2024. It was produced by DzyOnDaBeat and Dyryk.

== Composition ==
The production features an "ethereal" synth loop, 808s and hi-hats as well as a "spacey, pop-infused" beat. In the lyrics, he first talks about his "Yak Sauce" as he shifts his cadence and his time with a friend called "pook-a-dook".

== Critical reception ==
Zachary Horvath of HotNewHipHop wrote of the song, "Unless you are into the funny bars on this thing, then have at it. While some of the lines made us genuinely laugh out loud, Kodak has stronger writing skills than this. Just look at the lyrics section below and tell us what you think. The beat itself is solid but run of the mill at the same time." Donald Morrison of Passion of the Weiss commented, "The anthemic, almost corny production, sounds hilarious juxtaposed with Kodak's lyrics".

== Charts ==
Chart performance for "Shampoo"
Chart (2024)	Peak position
US Bubbling Under Hot 100 (Billboard)	17
US Hot R&B/Hip-Hop Songs (Billboard)	47
