= Zeze (song) =

2018 single by Kodak Black featuring Travis Scott and Offset

Single by Kodak Black featuring Travis Scott and Offset

from the album Dying to Live
- Released: October 12, 2018
- Recorded: 2018
- Genre: Trap; hyphy
- Length: 3:48
- Label: Atlantic
- Songwriters: Bill Kapri; Jacques Webster II; Kiari Cephus; David Doman; Christina Gandy-Rodgers; Justin Thomas; Marcus Prince
- Producer: D.A. Got That Dope

Kodak Black singles chronology
"If I'm Lyin, I'm Flyin" (2018)	"Zeze" (2018)	"Take One" (2018)

Travis Scott singles chronology
"Neighbor" (2018)	"Zeze" (2018)	"Yosemite" (2018)

Offset singles chronology
"Who Want the Smoke?" (2018)	"Zeze" (2018)	"Hurts Like Hell" (2019)

Music video
- "ZEZE (feat. Travis Scott and Offset)" on YouTube

"Zeze" (stylized in all caps) is a song by American rapper Kodak Black featuring American rappers Travis Scott and Offset. It was released by Atlantic Records on October 12, 2018. Produced by D.A. Got That Dope, the song debuted at number two on the US Billboard Hot 100 (behind "Girls Like You" by Maroon 5 featuring Cardi B) and at number one in Canada.

== Background ==
On August 18, 2018, Kodak Black was released from prison after having been arrested on multiple charges in January 2018. Three weeks later, he was spotted in a recording studio with rapper Travis Scott. Footage of the artists in the studio dancing to the instrumental of "Zeze" became a viral meme prior to the song's release.

== Remix ==
On October 24, 2018, American rappers Tyga and Swae Lee released an unofficial remix called "Shine". On November 5, 2018, South Korean rappers Xbf, Freaky, and Woozieboo released a remix track.

American rapper Joyner Lucas also remixed the song and it was released on November 22, 2018, as a diss track aimed at Tory Lanez.

== Music video ==
An official music video directed by Travis Scott was released on November 23, 2018. The video is a comedic take on the behind-the-scenes of a music video shoot, with Black, Scott, and Offset rapping in front of green screened ocean and volcano backgrounds.

== Charts ==
=== Weekly charts ===
Chart (2018–19)	Peak position
Australia (ARIA)	14
Austria (Ö3 Austria Top 40)	31
Belgium (Ultratip Bubbling Under Flanders)	2
Belgium (Ultratip Bubbling Under Wallonia)	15
Canada Hot 100 (Billboard)	1
Czech Republic Singles Digital (ČNS IFPI)	38
Denmark (Tracklisten)	16
Estonia (IFPI)	16
Finland (Suomen virallinen lista)	9
France (SNEP)	77
Greece International Digital Singles (IFPI)	3
Germany (GfK)	37
Hungary (Stream Top 40)	19
Ireland (IRMA)	11
Italy (FIMI)	92
Lithuania (AGATA)	10
Netherlands (Single Top 100)	22
New Zealand (Recorded Music NZ)	7
Norway (VG-lista)	10
Portugal (AFP)	26
Scottish Singles Sales (Official Charts)	77
Slovakia Singles Digital (ČNS IFPI)	24
Sweden (Sverigetopplistan)	7
Switzerland (Schweizer Hitparade)	13
UK Singles (Official Charts)	7
UK Hip Hop/R&B (Official Charts)	2
US Billboard Hot 100	2
US Hot R&B/Hip-Hop Songs (Billboard)	1
US Pop Airplay (Billboard)	38
US Rhythmic Airplay (Billboard)	1

=== Year-end charts ===
Chart (2018)	Position
US Hot R&B/Hip-Hop Songs (Billboard)	80
Chart (2019)	Position
Canada (Canadian Hot 100)	48
Portugal (AFP)	199
US Billboard Hot 100	31
US Hot R&B/Hip-Hop Songs (Billboard)	14
US Rhythmic (Billboard)	11
US Rolling Stone Top 100	57

== Certifications ==
Region	Certification	Certified units/sales
Australia (ARIA)	2× Platinum	140,000^{‡}
Denmark (IFPI Danmark)	Platinum	90,000^{‡}
France (SNEP)	Platinum	200,000^{‡}
Germany (BVMI)	Gold	200,000^{‡}
Italy (FIMI)	Gold	25,000^{‡}
New Zealand (RMNZ)	4× Platinum	120,000^{‡}
Poland (ZPAV)	Platinum	50,000^{‡}
Portugal (AFP)	Gold	5,000^{‡}
Spain (Promusicae)	Gold	30,000^{‡}
United Kingdom (BPI)	Platinum	600,000^{‡}
United States (RIAA)	9× Platinum	9,000,000^{‡}
^{‡} Sales+streaming figures based on certification alone.

== Release history ==
Region	Date	Format	Label	Ref.
Various	October 12, 2018	Digital download; streaming	Atlantic; WEA International	
United States	October 16, 2018	Rhythmic and urban contemporary radio	Atlantic	
