= Walk/Spin =

2022 single by Kodak Black

Single by Kodak Black

from the album Kutthroat Bill: Vol. 1
- Released: September 16, 2022
- Length: 2:46 ("Walk"); 2:31 ("Spin")
- Label: Atlantic
- Songwriters: Bill Kapri; Tye Gibson; DeWud Miyal Carr

Kodak Black singles chronology
"Spin the Block" (2022)	"Walk/Spin" (2022)	"I'm So Awesome" (2022)

Music video
- "Walk" on YouTube
- "Spin" on YouTube

"Walk" and "Spin" are songs by American rapper Kodak Black, released together on September 16, 2022, as a dual single and the lead single from his mixtape Kutthroat Bill: Vol. 1 (2022). Both songs were produced by Tye Beats, while "Spin" was also produced by 8th. The official single cover artwork for "Walk/Spin" was photographed by Zac Schuss in Broward County.

== Composition ==
With "Walk", Kodak Black raps about women, wealth and street life, while "Spin" has an atmosphere intended for dancing.

== Reception ==
The songs received praise from fans for a "unique flow and cadence".

== Music video ==
The music video for "Walk" was directed by KillerJack and released alongside the single. In it, Kodak Black is seen on a bike in the company of three women and sitting on steps leading to nowhere in a dark environment. The music video for "Spin" shows him making dance moves in a Soul Train-inspired setting.

== Controversy ==
In October 2022, American rapper Saucy Santana accused Kodak Black of copying his song "Walk", released in June 2021, on "Spin"; the word walk is repeatedly used in the choruses of both songs.

== Charts ==
=== "Walk" ===
Chart performance for "Walk"
Chart (2022)	Peak position
US Billboard Hot 100	100
US Hot R&B/Hip-Hop Songs (Billboard)	31

=== "Spin" ===
Chart performance for "Spin"
Chart (2022)	Peak position
US Bubbling Under Hot 100 (Billboard)	18
US Hot R&B/Hip-Hop Songs (Billboard)	50

== Certifications ==
Certifications for Walk
Region	Certification	Certified units/sales
United States (RIAA)	Platinum	1,000,000^{‡}
^{‡} Sales+streaming figures based on certification alone.
