= First Day Out (Kodak Black song) =

Song by rapper Kodak Black

Single by Kodak Black
- Released: June 16, 2017
- Length: 3:00
- Label: Atlantic; WEA
- Songwriters: Derek Garcia; Dieuson Octave
- Producer: Dyryk

Kodak Black singles chronology
| "ISpy (Remix)" (2017) | "First Day Out" (2017) | "Pills & Automobiles" (2017) |

Music video
- First Day Out on YouTube

"First Day Out" is a song recorded by American rapper Kodak Black. Produced by Dyryk, the song was his third non-album single and ninth career single.

== Background ==
The song is Black's first since his release from jail after a three-month sentence he received in early 2017 for violating his probation. It was described by Stereogum as "the latest in a growing tradition of songs that rappers record immediately after returning from prison." The song lyrically discusses Black hiding drugs in his jail cell and celebrating freedom upon his release.

== Music video ==
The song was also released alongside a music video, Black's first since the jail sentence, which features him "relishing his freedom with bags of money, delicious food, and sporty cars." Directed by 20K, the video "opens with Black hugging his mom and surveying his surroundings," before "celebrating with friends, partying and balling out upon his return home."

== Charts ==
| Chart | Peak position |
|---|---|
| US Billboard Hot 100 | 61 |
| US Hot R&B/Hip-Hop Songs (Billboard) | 27 |
| US Hot Rap Songs (Billboard) | 20 |
| Canada Hot 100 (Billboard) | 80 |

== Certifications ==
| Region | Certification | Certified units/sales |
|---|---|---|
| United States (RIAA) | Platinum | 1,000,000^{‡} |
^{‡} Sales+streaming figures based on certification alone.
