= Pimpin Ain't Eazy =

2019 single by Kodak Black

Single by Kodak Black

from the album Bill Israel
- Released: February 25, 2019
- Length: 2:57
- Label: Sniper Gang; Atlantic
- Songwriters: Bill Kapri; Danny Snodgrass Jr.; Nicholas Mira; Ryan Vojtesak
- Producers: Taz Taylor; Nick Mira; Charlie Handsome

Kodak Black singles chronology
"Bestie" (2019)	"Pimpin Ain't Eazy" (2019)	"Average" (2019)

Music video
- "Pimpin Ain't Eazy" on YouTube

"Pimpin Ain't Eazy" is a song by American rapper Kodak Black, released on February 25, 2019, as the lead single from his third studio album Bill Israel (2020). It was produced by Taz Taylor, Nick Mira and Charlie Handsome.

== Critical reception ==
Steve 'Flash' Juon of RapReviews wrote, "If you thought this was a cover of Big Daddy Kane's similarly named seminal rap duet with Nice & Smooth you'd be disappointed, and if you thought the 'Eazy' spelling indicated it was a tribute to the late Eric Wright you'd be equally disappointed. Honestly it's not even about pimping. He's not out there collecting money from his hoes, strutting in a fur lined suit with a stylish cane, threatening the patrons who refuse to pay his ladies of the evening. All he talks about is how few fucks he gives about anything."

== Music video ==
The music video was released on February 26, 2019. It was directed by Kodak Black and Sway Season.

== Controversy ==
The song garnered controversy for its use of the anti-lesbian slur "dyke" and references to rapper Young M.A, who is openly lesbian, in the chorus ("I be pullin' out straps on these fuck niggas / I go Young M.A on these dumb bitches / Like a dyke man, you niggas can't fuck with me") and second verse ("I'm fuckin' Young M.A, long as she got a coochie / Say she got the strap and the toolie, say she put the crack in her booty"). In addition, Kodak Black had already made advances to M.A. earlier in February 2019 by writing a comment on an Instagram photo of her and rapper Nicki Minaj: "Both Of Y'all a Get It." In an Instagram Live session, Young M.A. addressed the lyrics: "Y'all keep talking about this Kodak situation. Y'all niggas is weird, bro. Come on, obviously the nigga is weird, bro. Obviously, he on some shit, bro." She further stated they were both scheduled to perform at the Pot of Gold Music Festival in Phoenix, Arizona and she would address the situation in person. Kodak Black responded to her comments on Instagram Live:

Yo, y'all stop making Young M.A mad. That's my dog! Don't do that, baby. We gon' catch up. I just wanna be the homie. I just wanna be the forever homie in the cut, vibing... whenever you make up your mind up, I'm here. I'm talking about bae so cute!" I do a lot of stuff, but I do more good than I do bad and more people love me than hate me. I'm talking about, how you a girl but don't want your pussy penetrated? How? Don't be mad at me, 'cause I want you, baby. Don't be mad at me!

In a subsequent Instagram Live video, Young M.A clarified she did not call Kodak weird as an insult, saying "I'm weird. I know I'm weird, I'm good with that. And that nigga weird too. And he know he weird... Y'all stay trying to blow shit out of proportion."

In addition to Young M.A, Kodak Black also makes sexual remarks to rappers Dej Loaf and Missy Elliott in the song.

== Charts ==
Chart performance for "Pimpin Ain't Eazy"
Chart (2019)	Peak position
US Bubbling Under Hot 100 (Billboard)	8
US Hot R&B/Hip-Hop Songs (Billboard)	49

== Certifications ==
Certifications for Pimpin Ain't Eazy
Region	Certification	Certified units/sales
United States (RIAA)	2× Platinum	2,000,000^{‡}
^{‡} Sales+streaming figures based on certification alone.
