= Heart Break Kodak =

Mixtape by Kodak Black
- Released: February 14, 2018
- Genre: R&B
- Length: 60:12
- Label: Atlantic
- Producers: Ben Billions; C-Clipz Beatz; Daniel Worthy; Dyryk; Frank Dukes; Helluva; Infamous; Murda Beatz; Schife; Scott Styles; Scott Supreme; SkipOnDaBeat; The 90s

Kodak Black chronology
F.E.M.A. (2017)	Heart Break Kodak (2018)	Dying to Live (2018)

Singles from Heart Break Kodak
- 1. "Codeine Dreaming" Released: November 24, 2017

Heart Break Kodak is the seventh mixtape by American rapper Kodak Black. It was released on February 14, 2018, via Atlantic Records. The mixtape features guest appearances by Lil Wayne and Tory Lanez, while the production was handled by Murda Beatz, Helluva, Ben Billions, Dyryk, and C-Clipz Beatz, among others.

== Background ==
The mixtape was teased by Black on social media, he shared heart-themed images along with the hashtag "#HBK". The mixtape's release was announced a day before, on February 13, 2018. The mixtape was released while Black was in jail, serving a sentence he received for charges including "grand theft of a firearm, possession of marijuana, and two counts of probation violation".

== Critical reception ==
Professional ratings
Review scores
Source	Rating
HipHopDX	3.8/5
Pitchfork	5.0/10

Pitchfork described the mixtape as "a war waged for Kodak's heart by the streets and unnamed lovers." HipHopDX called the mixtape an "808s & Heartbreak meets the trap (minus any of the game-changing elements)". The mixtape's theme is described by PopKiller as "drugs and wealth, revolves around amorities and angels and demons with this binding". AllMusic described the mixtape as "R&B-influenced than his prior work, with the rapper singing more frequently than before".

== Track listing ==
Credits adapted from BMI.

No.	Title	Writer(s)	Producer(s)	Length
1.	"Running Outta Love"	Dieuson Octave; Shane Lindstrom; Adam Feeney	Murda Beatz; Frank Dukes	3:45
2.	"Bill and Jill"	Octave; Derek Garcia	Dyryk	3:49
3.	"Hate Being Alone"	Octave; Scott Styles; Scott Supreme; Marcus White	Scott Styles; Scott Supreme	4:04
4.	"Acting Weird"	Octave; Garcia	Dyryk	4:03
5.	"Codeine Dreaming" (featuring Lil Wayne)	Octave; Benjamin Diehl; Marco Rodriguez-Diaz; Ian Lewis; Dwayne Carter Jr.	Ben Billions; Schife; Infamous	4:24
6.	"Why You Always Gotta Go"	Octave; Garcia	Dyryk	3:20
7.	"Laudy"	Octave; Garcia	Dyryk	4:01
8.	"Fuck With You" (featuring Tory Lanez)	Octave; Garcia; Daystar Peterson	Dyryk	3:35
9.	"I Get Lonely"	Octave; Diehl; Rodriguez-Diaz	Ben Billions; Infamous	3:33
10.	"Loyal"	Octave; Jermaine Smith	C-Clip Beatz	2:45
11.	"Corrupted"	Octave; J. Smith	C-Clip Beatz	2:41
12.	"Kicking In"	Octave; Edgar Ferrera; Daniel Smith	SkipOnDaBeat; Daniel Worthy	3:09
13.	"Call You"	Octave; Diehl	Ben Billions	4:20
14.	"No Feelings"	Octave; Windell Durrant; Ijah Cheatham-Stoute	The 90s	3:02
15.	"Helluva Love"	Octave; Martin McCurtis	Helluva	3:37
16.	"When Vultures Cry"	Octave; Martin McCurtis	Helluva	3:20
17.	"Feb 14"	Octave; J. Smith	C-Clip Beatz	3:20
Total length:				60:12

== Charts ==
Chart (2018)	Peak position
Canadian Albums (Billboard)	34
US Billboard 200	25
US Top R&B/Hip-Hop Albums (Billboard)	15

== Certifications ==
Region	Certification	Certified units/sales
United States (RIAA)	Gold	500,000^{‡}
^{‡} Sales+streaming figures based on certification alone.
