= List of number-one R&B/hip-hop songs of 2022 (U.S.) =

This page lists the songs that reached number-one on the overall Hot R&B/Hip-Hop Songs chart, the R&B Songs chart (which was created in 2012), and the Hot Rap Songs chart in 2022. The R&B Songs and Rap Songs charts partly serve as distillations of the overall R&B/Hip-Hop Songs chart.

== Chart history ==
Key
†	Indicates best-performing song of 2022

Issue date	R&B/Hip-Hop Songs	Artist	R&B Songs	Artist	Rap Songs	Artist	R&B/Hip-Hop Airplay	Artist	Refs.
January 1	"Broadway Girls"	Lil Durk featuring Morgan Wallen	"Smokin out the Window"	Silk Sonic (Bruno Mars and Anderson .Paak)	"Broadway Girls"	Lil Durk featuring Morgan Wallen	"Essence" †	Wizkid featuring Tems	
January 8	"Industry Baby"	Lil Nas X and Jack Harlow	"Smokin out the Window"	Silk Sonic (Bruno Mars and Anderson .Paak)	"Industry Baby"	Lil Nas X and Jack Harlow	"Essence" †	Wizkid featuring Tems	
January 15	"Industry Baby"	Lil Nas X and Jack Harlow	"Smokin out the Window"	Silk Sonic (Bruno Mars and Anderson .Paak)	"Industry Baby"	Lil Nas X and Jack Harlow	"Essence" †	Wizkid featuring Tems	
January 22	"Super Gremlin"	Kodak Black	"Sacrifice"	The Weeknd	"Super Gremlin"	Kodak Black	"Essence" †	Wizkid featuring Tems	
January 29	"Super Gremlin"	Kodak Black	"Smokin out the Window"	Silk Sonic (Bruno Mars and Anderson .Paak)	"Super Gremlin"	Kodak Black	"Essence" †	Wizkid featuring Tems	
February 5	"Super Gremlin"	Kodak Black	"Smokin out the Window"	Silk Sonic (Bruno Mars and Anderson .Paak)	"Super Gremlin"	Kodak Black	"Essence" †	Wizkid featuring Tems	
February 12	"Super Gremlin"	Kodak Black	"Smokin out the Window"	Silk Sonic (Bruno Mars and Anderson .Paak)	"Super Gremlin"	Kodak Black	"Essence" †	Wizkid featuring Tems	
February 19	"Do We Have a Problem?"	Nicki Minaj and Lil Baby	"Hrs and Hrs"	Muni Long	"Do We Have a Problem?"	Nicki Minaj and Lil Baby	"Essence" †	Wizkid featuring Tems	
February 26	"Super Gremlin"	Kodak Black	"Hrs and Hrs"	Muni Long	"Super Gremlin"	Kodak Black	"Essence" †	Wizkid featuring Tems	
March 5	"Super Gremlin"	Kodak Black	"Hrs and Hrs"	Muni Long	"Super Gremlin"	Kodak Black	"Essence" †	Wizkid featuring Tems	
March 12	"Super Gremlin"	Kodak Black	"Woman"	Doja Cat	"Super Gremlin"	Kodak Black	"Super Gremlin"	Kodak Black	
March 19	"Super Gremlin"	Kodak Black	"Woman"	Doja Cat	"Super Gremlin"	Kodak Black	"Super Gremlin"	Kodak Black	
March 26	"Super Gremlin"	Kodak Black	"Woman"	Doja Cat	"Super Gremlin"	Kodak Black	"Super Gremlin"	Kodak Black	
April 2	"Super Gremlin"	Kodak Black	"Woman"	Doja Cat	"Super Gremlin"	Kodak Black	"I Hate U"	SZA	
April 9	"Big Energy"	Latto	"Woman"	Doja Cat	"Big Energy"	Latto	"Hrs and Hrs"	Muni Long	
April 16	"Big Energy"	Latto	"Woman"	Doja Cat	"Big Energy"	Latto	"Hrs and Hrs"	Muni Long	
April 23	"First Class" †	Jack Harlow	"Woman"	Doja Cat	"First Class" †	Jack Harlow	"Hrs and Hrs"	Muni Long	
April 30	"First Class" †	Jack Harlow	"Woman"	Doja Cat	"First Class" †	Jack Harlow	"Hrs and Hrs"	Muni Long	
May 7	"First Class" †	Jack Harlow	"Woman"	Doja Cat	"First Class" †	Jack Harlow	"Hrs and Hrs"	Muni Long	
May 14	"Wait for U"	Future featuring Drake and Tems	"Woman"	Doja Cat	"Wait for U"	Future featuring Drake and Tems	"Hrs and Hrs"	Muni Long	
May 21	"First Class" †	Jack Harlow	"About Damn Time" †	Lizzo	"First Class" †	Jack Harlow	"Hrs and Hrs"	Muni Long	
May 28	"First Class" †	Jack Harlow	"Die Hard"	Kendrick Lamar featuring Blxst and Amanda Reifer	"First Class" †	Jack Harlow	"Hrs and Hrs"	Muni Long	
June 4	"First Class" †	Jack Harlow	"About Damn Time" †	Lizzo	"First Class" †	Jack Harlow	"I Hate U"	SZA	
June 11	"First Class" †	Jack Harlow	"About Damn Time" †	Lizzo	"First Class" †	Jack Harlow	"I Hate U"	SZA	
June 18	"First Class" †	Jack Harlow	"About Damn Time" †	Lizzo	"First Class" †	Jack Harlow	"I Hate U"	SZA	
June 25	"First Class" †	Jack Harlow	"About Damn Time" †	Lizzo	"First Class" †	Jack Harlow	"First Class"	Jack Harlow	
July 2	"Jimmy Cooks"	Drake featuring 21 Savage	"About Damn Time" †	Lizzo	"Jimmy Cooks"	Drake featuring 21 Savage	"First Class"	Jack Harlow	
July 9	"First Class" †	Jack Harlow	"About Damn Time" †	Lizzo	"First Class" †	Jack Harlow	"Wait for U"	Future featuring Drake and Tems	
July 16	"About Damn Time"	Lizzo	"About Damn Time" †	Lizzo	"First Class" †	Jack Harlow	"Wait for U"	Future featuring Drake and Tems	
July 23	"About Damn Time"	Lizzo	"About Damn Time" †	Lizzo	"First Class" †	Jack Harlow	"Wait for U"	Future featuring Drake and Tems	
July 30	"About Damn Time"	Lizzo	"About Damn Time" †	Lizzo	"First Class" †	Jack Harlow	"Wait for U"	Future featuring Drake and Tems	
August 6	"About Damn Time"	Lizzo	"About Damn Time" †	Lizzo	"First Class" †	Jack Harlow	"Break My Soul"	Beyoncé	
August 13	"Break My Soul"	Beyoncé	"Break My Soul"	Beyoncé	"Wait for U"	Future featuring Drake and Tems	"Break My Soul"	Beyoncé	
August 20	"Break My Soul"	Beyoncé	"Break My Soul"	Beyoncé	"Staying Alive"	DJ Khaled featuring Drake and Lil Baby	"Break My Soul"	Beyoncé	
August 27	"Super Freaky Girl"	Nicki Minaj	"About Damn Time" †	Lizzo	"Super Freaky Girl"	Nicki Minaj	"Break My Soul"	Beyoncé	
September 3	"About Damn Time"	Lizzo	"About Damn Time" †	Lizzo	"Super Freaky Girl"	Nicki Minaj	"Break My Soul"	Beyoncé	
September 10	"Bad Habit"	Steve Lacy	"Bad Habit"	Steve Lacy	"Super Freaky Girl"	Nicki Minaj	"Wait for U"	Future featuring Drake and Tems	
September 17	"Bad Habit"	Steve Lacy	"Bad Habit"	Steve Lacy	"Super Freaky Girl"	Nicki Minaj	"Wait for U"	Future featuring Drake and Tems	
September 24	"Bad Habit"	Steve Lacy	"Bad Habit"	Steve Lacy	"Super Freaky Girl"	Nicki Minaj	"Wait for U"	Future featuring Drake and Tems	
October 1	"Bad Habit"	Steve Lacy	"Bad Habit"	Steve Lacy	"Super Freaky Girl"	Nicki Minaj	"Wait for U"	Future featuring Drake and Tems	
October 8	"Bad Habit"	Steve Lacy	"Bad Habit"	Steve Lacy	"Super Freaky Girl"	Nicki Minaj	"Wait for U"	Future featuring Drake and Tems	
October 15	"Bad Habit"	Steve Lacy	"Bad Habit"	Steve Lacy	"Super Freaky Girl"	Nicki Minaj	"Wait for U"	Future featuring Drake and Tems	
October 22	"Bad Habit"	Steve Lacy	"Bad Habit"	Steve Lacy	"Super Freaky Girl"	Nicki Minaj	"Wait for U"	Future featuring Drake and Tems	
October 29	"Bad Habit"	Steve Lacy	"Bad Habit"	Steve Lacy	"California Breeze"	Lil Baby	"Wait for U"	Future featuring Drake and Tems	
November 5	"Bad Habit"	Steve Lacy	"Bad Habit"	Steve Lacy	"Super Freaky Girl"	Nicki Minaj	"Wait for U"	Future featuring Drake and Tems	
November 12	"Lift Me Up"	Rihanna	"Lift Me Up"	Rihanna	"Super Freaky Girl"	Nicki Minaj	"Free Mind"	Tems	
November 19	"Rich Flex"	Drake and 21 Savage	"Bad Habit"	Steve Lacy	"Rich Flex"	Drake and 21 Savage	"Free Mind"	Tems	
November 26	"Rich Flex"	Drake and 21 Savage	"Bad Habit"	Steve Lacy	"Rich Flex"	Drake and 21 Savage	"Free Mind"	Tems	
December 3	"Rich Flex"	Drake and 21 Savage	"Bad Habit"	Steve Lacy	"Rich Flex"	Drake and 21 Savage	"Free Mind"	Tems	
December 10	"Rich Flex"	Drake and 21 Savage	"Bad Habit"	Steve Lacy	"Rich Flex"	Drake and 21 Savage	"Cuff It"	Beyoncé	
December 17	"Creepin'"	Metro Boomin, The Weeknd and 21 Savage	"Creepin'"	Metro Boomin, The Weeknd and 21 Savage	"Superhero (Heroes & Villains)"	Metro Boomin, Future and Chris Brown	"Cuff It"	Beyoncé	
December 24	"Kill Bill"	SZA	"Kill Bill"	SZA	"Rich Flex"	Drake and 21 Savage	"Tomorrow 2"	GloRilla and Cardi B	
December 31	"Kill Bill"	SZA	"Kill Bill"	SZA	"Rich Flex"	Drake and 21 Savage	"Tomorrow 2"	GloRilla and Cardi B	

== See also ==
- 2022 in American music
- 2022 in hip hop music
- List of Billboard Hot 100 number-one singles of 2022
- List of Billboard number-one R&B/hip-hop albums of 2022
- Billboard Year-End Hot R&B/Hip-Hop Songs of 2022
