= List of Billboard number-one R&B/hip-hop albums of 2022 =

This page lists the albums that reached number-one on the overall Top R&B/Hip-Hop Albums chart, the R&B Albums chart (which was re-created in 2013), and the Rap Albums chart in 2022. The R&B Albums and Rap Albums charts partly serve as respective distillations for R&B and rap-specific titles of the overall R&B/Hip-Hop Albums chart.

== List of number ones ==
Key
| † | Indicates best-performing album of 2022 |

| Issue date | R&B/Hip-Hop Albums | Artist(s) | R&B Albums | Artist(s) | Rap Albums | Artist(s) | Refs. |
|---|---|---|---|---|---|---|---|
| January 1 | Live Life Fast | Roddy Ricch | Merry Christmas | Mariah Carey | Live Life Fast | Roddy Ricch | |
| January 8 | The Christmas Song | Nat King Cole | The Christmas Song | Nat King Cole | Certified Lover Boy † | Drake | |
| January 15 | Certified Lover Boy † | Drake | Planet Her | Doja Cat | Certified Lover Boy † | Drake | |
| January 22 | DS4Ever | Gunna | Dawn FM | The Weeknd | DS4Ever | Gunna | |
| January 29 | DS4Ever | Gunna | Dawn FM | The Weeknd | DS4Ever | Gunna | |
| February 5 | Colors | YoungBoy Never Broke Again | Dawn FM | The Weeknd | Colors | YoungBoy Never Broke Again | |
| February 12 | Dawn FM | The Weeknd | Dawn FM | The Weeknd | DS4Ever | Gunna | |
| February 19 | DS4Ever | Gunna | Dawn FM | The Weeknd | DS4Ever | Gunna | |
| February 26 | DS4Ever | Gunna | The Highlights † | The Weeknd | DS4Ever | Gunna | |
| March 5 | DS4Ever | Gunna | The Highlights † | The Weeknd | DS4Ever | Gunna | |
| March 12 | Back for Everything | Kodak Black | The Highlights † | The Weeknd | Back for Everything | Kodak Black | |
| March 19 | What It Means to Be King | King Von | The Highlights † | The Weeknd | What It Means to Be King | King Von | |
| March 26 | 7220 | Lil Durk | The Highlights † | The Weeknd | 7220 | Lil Durk | |
| April 2 | 7220 | Lil Durk | The Highlights † | The Weeknd | 7220 | Lil Durk | |
| April 9 | 7220 | Lil Durk | The Highlights † | The Weeknd | 7220 | Lil Durk | |
| April 16 | 7220 | Lil Durk | The Highlights † | The Weeknd | 7220 | Lil Durk | |
| April 23 | 7220 | Lil Durk | Planet Her | Doja Cat | 7220 | Lil Durk | |
| April 30 | Call Me If You Get Lost | Tyler, the Creator | Planet Her | Doja Cat | Call Me If You Get Lost | Tyler, the Creator | |
| May 7 | It's Almost Dry | Pusha T | Planet Her | Doja Cat | It's Almost Dry | Pusha T | |
| May 14 | I Never Liked You | Future | Dawn FM | The Weeknd | I Never Liked You | Future | |
| May 21 | I Never Liked You | Future | Planet Her | Doja Cat | I Never Liked You | Future | |
| May 28 | Mr. Morale & the Big Steppers | Kendrick Lamar | Planet Her | Doja Cat | Mr. Morale & the Big Steppers | Kendrick Lamar | |
| June 4 | Mr. Morale & the Big Steppers | Kendrick Lamar | Planet Her | Doja Cat | Mr. Morale & the Big Steppers | Kendrick Lamar | |
| June 11 | Mr. Morale & the Big Steppers | Kendrick Lamar | Planet Her | Doja Cat | Mr. Morale & the Big Steppers | Kendrick Lamar | |
| June 18 | Twelve Carat Toothache | Post Malone | Planet Her | Doja Cat | I Never Liked You | Future | |
| June 25 | Twelve Carat Toothache | Post Malone | Ctrl | SZA | I Never Liked You | Future | |
| July 2 | Honestly, Nevermind | Drake | Honestly, Nevermind | Drake | I Never Liked You | Future | |
| July 9 | Honestly, Nevermind | Drake | Honestly, Nevermind | Drake | 7220 | Lil Durk | |
| July 16 | Honestly, Nevermind | Drake | Honestly, Nevermind | Drake | 7220 | Lil Durk | |
| July 23 | Wasteland | Brent Faiyaz | Wasteland | Brent Faiyaz | I Never Liked You | Future | |
| July 30 | Honestly, Nevermind | Drake | Honestly, Nevermind | Drake | I Never Liked You | Future | |
| August 6 | I Never Liked You | Future | Honestly, Nevermind | Drake | I Never Liked You | Future | |
| August 13 | Renaissance | Beyoncé | Renaissance | Beyoncé | Sing Me A Lullaby, My Sweet Temptation | Suicideboys | |
| August 20 | The Last Slimeto | YoungBoy Never Broke Again | Renaissance | Beyoncé | The Last Slimeto | YoungBoy Never Broke Again | |
| August 27 | Beautiful Mind | Rod Wave | Renaissance | Beyoncé | Beautiful Mind | Rod Wave | |
| September 3 | Beautiful Mind | Rod Wave | Renaissance | Beyoncé | Beautiful Mind | Rod Wave | |
| September 10 | God Did | DJ Khaled | Renaissance | Beyoncé | God Did | DJ Khaled | |
| September 17 | God Did | DJ Khaled | Renaissance | Beyoncé | God Did | DJ Khaled | |
| September 24 | Demons Protected by Angels | Nav | Renaissance | Beyoncé | Demons Protected by Angels | Nav | |
| October 1 | The Highlights | The Weeknd | The Highlights † | The Weeknd | I Never Felt Nun | EST Gee | |
| October 8 | Renaissance | Beyoncé | Renaissance | Beyoncé | Beautiful Mind | Rod Wave | |
| October 15 | The Highlights | The Weeknd | The Highlights † | The Weeknd | Beautiful Mind | Rod Wave | |
| October 22 | Renaissance | Beyoncé | Renaissance | Beyoncé | Only Built for Infinity Links | Quavo and Takeoff | |
| October 29 | It's Only Me | Lil Baby | The Highlights † | The Weeknd | It's Only Me | Lil Baby | |
| November 5 | It's Only Me | Lil Baby | The Highlights † | The Weeknd | It's Only Me | Lil Baby | |
| November 12 | It's Only Me | Lil Baby | The Highlights † | The Weeknd | It's Only Me | Lil Baby | |
| November 19 | Her Loss | Drake and 21 Savage | The Highlights † | The Weeknd | Her Loss | Drake and 21 Savage | |
| November 26 | Her Loss | Drake and 21 Savage | The Highlights † | The Weeknd | Her Loss | Drake and 21 Savage | |
| December 3 | Her Loss | Drake and 21 Savage | The Highlights † | The Weeknd | Her Loss | Drake and 21 Savage | |
| December 10 | Her Loss | Drake and 21 Savage | The Highlights † | The Weeknd | Her Loss | Drake and 21 Savage | |
| December 17 | Heroes & Villains | Metro Boomin | The Highlights † | The Weeknd | Heroes & Villains | Metro Boomin | |
| December 24 | SOS | SZA | SOS | SZA | Heroes & Villains | Metro Boomin | |
| December 31 | SOS | SZA | SOS | SZA | Heroes & Villains | Metro Boomin | |

== See also ==
- 2022 in American music
- 2022 in hip-hop music
- List of Billboard 200 number-one albums of 2022
- List of number-one R&B/hip-hop songs of 2022 (U.S.)
