= I Wish =

I Wish may refer to:

== Film ==
- I Wish (film), a 2011 Japanese film by Hirokazu Kore-eda
- I Wish (Qimiao-de lucheng), a 2007 Taiwan comedy with Blackie Chen and Cheryl Yang

== Music ==
- I Wish (band), a Japanese pop group
- "I Want" song, a type of song popular in musical theatre

=== Albums ===
- I Wish (Sammy Adams album) (2012)
- I Wish (Skee-Lo album) (1995)
- I Wish (Deen album) (1996)

=== Songs ===
- "I Wish" (Carl Thomas song) (2000)
- "I Wish" (Cher Lloyd song) (2013)
- "I Wish" (Gabrielle song) (1993)
- "I Wish" (Hayley Kiyoko song) (2019)
- "I Wish" (Jo Dee Messina song) (2003)
- "I Wish" (Joel Corry song) (2021)
- "I Wish" (Kodak Black song) (2022)
- "I Wish" (Mini Viva song) (2009)
- "I Wish" (Morning Musume song) (2000)
- "I Wish" (Naniwa Danshi song) (2023)
- "I Wish" (R. Kelly song) (2000)
- "I Wish" (Shanice song) (1994)
- "I Wish" (Skee-Lo song) (1995)
- "I Wish" (Stevie Wonder song) (1976)
- "I Wish", a 2006 song by Babyshambles from The Blinding E.P.
- "I Wish", a 1998 song by Graham Coxon from The Sky Is Too High
- "I Wish", a 2007 song by Hilary Duff from Dignity
- "I Wish", a 2011 song by Hot Chelle Rae from Whatever
- "I Wish", a 2022 song by Imagine Dragons from Mercury – Acts 1 & 2
- "I Wish", a 2003 song by Infected Mushroom from Converting Vegetarians
- "I Wish", a 1999 song by Ai Maeda for Digimon Adventure
- "I Wish", a 2011 song by One Direction from Up All Night
- "I Wish", a 2023 song by Reneé Rapp from Snow Angel
- "I Wish", a 2021 song by Jace Chan from Processing
- "I WISH", a 2025 song by 21 Savage featuring Jawan Harris from What Happened to the Streets?
