= Usain Boo =

2022 single by Kodak Black

Single by Kodak Black

from the album Back for Everything
- Released: April 5, 2022
- Length: 3:06
- Label: Sniper Gang; Atlantic
- Songwriters: Bill Kapri; Brittany Hazzard; Eamon Doyle; Kirk Robinson; Yared Williams; Daniel Celestin
- Producers: Starrah; June Nawakii

Kodak Black singles chronology
"B.A.M." (2022)	"Usain Boo" (2022)	"Save the Day" (2022)

Music video
- "Usain Boo" on YouTube

"Usain Boo" is a song by American rapper Kodak Black from his fourth studio album Back for Everything (2022). Produced by Starrah and June Nawakii, it was sent to rhythmic contemporary radio on April 5, 2022 as the second single from the album. The song contains a sample of "On & On" by Eamon and its title is a reference to Jamaican springer Usain Bolt.

== Music video ==
An official music video was released on July 17, 2022. Directed by Young Chang, it sees Kodak Black dancing with a team of track and field athletes in front of a turquoise Bentley. The clip also shows a police officer chasing a young man through a neighborhood, but losing him after being tripped.

== Charts ==
Chart performance for "Usain Boo"
Chart (2022)	Peak position
US Billboard Hot 100	81
US Hot R&B/Hip-Hop Songs (Billboard)	28
US Rhythmic Airplay (Billboard)	19

== Certifications ==
Certifications for Usain Boo
Region	Certification	Certified units/sales
United States (RIAA)	Gold	500,000^{‡}
^{‡} Sales+streaming figures based on certification alone.
