= Just Getting Started =

Just Getting Started may refer to:

- Just Getting Started (Loverboy album), 2007
- Just Getting Started (Kodak Black album), 2025
- Just Getting Started (2017 film), an American action comedy film
- Just Getting Started (1946 film), a Czech comedy film
