= No Flockin =

2015 single by Kodak Black

Single by Kodak Black

from the album Heart of the Projects
- Released: July 6, 2015
- Genre: Hip-hop; freestyle rap
- Length: 2:44
- Label: Dollaz N Dealz; Sniper Gang; Atlantic
- Songwriters: Bill K. Kapri; Rui Wen Pan
- Producer: Vinnyx (VinnyxProd)

Kodak Black singles chronology
"No Flockin" (2015)	"Skrilla" (2014)

Alternative cover
- Original cover from YouTube video.

Music video
- "No Flockin" on YouTube

"No Flockin" (also known as "No Flockin Freestyle") is the debut single by American rapper Kodak Black. The song, a rap freestyle over an instrumental of the same name produced by Vinnyx (VinnyxProd), became a sleeper hit eventually peaking at 95 on the US Billboard Hot 100 in January 2017. The song first appeared on July 27, 2014, on Kodak Black's official YouTube account, before being released on iTunes on July 6, 2015, by Dollaz N Dealz Entertainment, Sniper Gang and Atlantic Records.

== Background ==
In 2015, Canadian rapper Drake played a role in boosting Kodak Black's profile by posting a video to Instagram of himself dancing to Kodak's track "Skrt". This exposure transformed Kodak from a relatively unknown artist into a contender for the 2016 Freshman cover. Drake further gave Kodak Black recognition by playing "No Flockin" on his OVO Sound Radio Show, further amplifying interest in the song and caused it to go viral alongside "Skrt".

In an interview with Genius, VinnyX described the circumstances surrounding the song's creation. At the time, he was a college student disenchanted with his studies. One day, feeling frustrated, he decided to experiment with a MIDI keyboard that had been unused for several months. This spontaneous decision led to the creation of a beat that he uploaded to YouTube, where it eventually caught Kodak Black's attention, despite the rapper being relatively unknown at the time.

== Composition and lyrics ==
In an interview with Genius, VinnyX elaborated on the production process, explaining that the song originated from a single melody. He progressively layered additional elements, incorporating percussion, hi-hats, and kicks, while opting for a reggae bass instead of traditional 808s. The beat was further enhanced with a choir and horn section, creating a unique sound that defied categorization. VinnyX noted Kodak's distinctive flow contributed significantly to the track's impact, stating, "It really embraced what I was feeling when I was making the instrumental". He reflected on the song's influence and his aspirations as a producer, acknowledging the challenges of establishing a name in the industry.

Lyrically, Kodak Black initially approached "No Flockin" with a sense of irreverence, using it as a means to tease his friends who were indulging in the use of Flakka. In an interview with DJ Akademiks, he confessed that he didn't particularly like the song, viewing it as a lighthearted jest rather than a serious track. Kodak explained that he was inspired by observing his friends and family, noting, "I was just clowning them." Despite its informal origins and his initial reluctance, the song gained widespread popularity, ultimately becoming a viral hit and contributing significantly to Kodak Black's rise in the music industry and the broader hip-hop landscape, paralleling the rise of other artists like Cardi B.

== Music video ==
The song's accompanying music video, directed by BonesVision, first appeared on August 25, 2014, on Kodak Black's official YouTube account. It showcases a minimalistic night setting, featuring just one location—a street with a single car illuminated by a streetlight. The video highlights Kodak's commanding presence as a 17-year-old rapper, showcasing his unique flow over three uninterrupted minutes. The director, BonesVision, employs techniques like night vision and image doubling, creating a documentarian feel.

=== Reception ===
The music video received generally positive response from critics, noted for its minimalist approach and effective use of visual elements. According to Rolling Stone Australia, the video demonstrates that simplicity can lead to impactful storytelling, emphasizing that sometimes "all you need for a great video is one set, one car under one streetlight, one verse stretching on for three effortless minutes by one 17-year-old with outsized charisma, and a singular flow". Rolling Stone Australia also listed it 146th on their list of the "150 Greatest Hip-Hop Videos of All Time".

== Commercial performance ==
"No Flockin" debuted at number 95 on US Billboard Hot 100 for the chart dated January 14, 2017, over 2 years after the song's initial release date. The following week, the song dropped off of the Hot 100. The song was Kodak Black's first charting song as a lead artist, and his second charting entry following his feature on French Montana's "Lockjaw". In June 2017, the song was certified Platinum by the Recording Industry Association of America (RIAA) for sales of over one million digital copies in the United States.

== Legacy ==
Kodak's flow on the song was sampled/interpolated in "Bodak Yellow" by American rapper Cardi B, which was released in June 2017. The song would go on to top the Billboard Hot 100 in late September 2017 and was certified Diamond in 2021, becoming the first song to be certified diamond by a female rapper. Kodak responded with, "Bodak Yellow Went Diamond Dam Right".

== No Flockin 2 (Bodak Orange) ==
"No Flockin 2 (Bodak Orange)"

Song by Kodak Black
- Released: September 19, 2017
- Recorded: 2017
- Genre: Hip-hop; freestyle rap
- Length: 3:05
- Label: Dollaz N Dealz; Sniper Gang; Atlantic
- Songwriter: Bill K. Kapri
- Producer: Vinnyx (VinnyxProd)

Music video
- "No Flockin 2 (Bodak Orange)" on YouTube

On September 19, 2017, Kodak Black released "No Flockin 2 (Bodak Orange)", an updated version of "No Flockin" featuring the same instrumental as the original but with all new lyrics. The song's title and lyrics include references to Cardi B's "Bodak Yellow", and the song's lyrical content also contains jabs to other rappers jacking his flow.

=== Music video ===
The accompanying music video to "No Flockin 2 (Bodak Orange)", directed and edited by Kodak Black alongside Yung Mike, was released on the same day through Kodak Black's official YouTube account. In the video, Kodak showcases a lavish lifestyle, throwing money around inside a private jet while dancing in front of it alongside friends. Throughout the clip, he boasts about his affinity for the color orange, his arsenal, and his distinctive fashion, shown through his jewelry, Christian Louboutin sneakers, and upscale cologne. Kyle Neubeck of Complex in a review of the music video highlighted significant changes to Kodak Black's life shown through the high-budget visuals in comparison to the original "No Flockin".

=== Critical reception ===
Kyle Neubeck of Complex in a review of "No Flockin 2 (Bodak Orange)" highlighted the stark contrasts between it and the original "No Flockin". While both tracks utilize the same instrumental, Neubeck wrote that Kodak "actually sounds like he's rapping" and his delivery in the original is more structured and purposeful. In contrast, "No Flockin 2" appears more disjointed, writing that the song "sounds like words are just falling out of Kodak's mouth, for a reason that's not immediately clear".

== Personnel ==
- Kodak Black – Vocals
- VinnyxProd – Production

== Charts ==
Weekly chart performance for "No Flockin"
Chart (2016–2017)	Peak position
US Billboard Hot 100	95
US Hot R&B/Hip-Hop Songs (Billboard)	38

== Certifications ==
Certifications for "No Flockin"
Region	Certification	Certified units/sales
Canada (Music Canada)	Gold	40,000^{‡}
New Zealand (RMNZ)	Platinum	30,000^{‡}
United Kingdom (BPI)	Silver	200,000^{‡}
United States (RIAA)	2× Platinum	2,000,000^{‡}
^{‡} Sales+streaming figures based on certification alone.
