= On Everything =

On Everything may refer to:

- "On Everything", a song by DJ Khaled featuring Travis Scott, Rick Ross, and Big Sean from the 2017 album Grateful
- "On Everything", a song by Kodak Black from the 2022 album Back for Everything
