= Hit Bout It =

2021 single by Lil Yachty featuring Kodak Black

Single by Lil Yachty featuring Kodak Black
- Released: February 19, 2021
- Genre: Southern hip-hop; hardcore rap; trap
- Length: 2:57
- Label: Motown; Quality Control
- Songwriters: Miles McCollum; Bill Kapri; Carlo Coxen II
- Producer: Carlo Anthony

Lil Yachty singles chronology
"Honey Pack (Remix)" (2021)	"Hit Bout It" (2021)	"Last Minute" (2021)

Kodak Black singles chronology
"Every Balmain" (2021)	"Hit Bout It" (2021)	"Thugged Out" (2021)

Music video
- "Hit Bout It" on YouTube

"Hit Bout It" is a song by American rapper Lil Yachty featuring fellow American rapper Kodak Black. It was released on February 19, 2021, through Motown and Quality Control Music, accompanied by a music video on the same day. Written by both artists alongside producer Carlo Anthony, the song depicts the rappers' "rockstar lifestyles". The song charted on the Billboard Hot 100, peaking at number 67.

== Background ==
"Hit Bout It" marks a collaboration between Lil Yachty and Kodak Black, both prominent figures in Southern hip hop. The track was produced by Carlo Anthony and co-written by the two rappers alongside Carlo Coxen II. It was released as a standalone single and sits between "Honey Pack (Remix)" and "Last Minute" in Lil Yachty's singles chronology, and between "Every Balmain" and "Thugged Out" in Kodak Black's.

== Music video ==
Prior to its release, Lil Yachty shared behind-the-scenes footage of the music video to build anticipation. The video opens with Yachty meeting Kodak Black's mother and family and sharing a meal of Haitian cuisine with them, grounding the otherwise lavish visual in a personal moment. The two rappers then cruise in Ferraris, show off their jewelry, and visit a strip club. The video also features appearances by fellow rappers Gucci Mane and Trick Daddy.

== Commercial performance ==
"Hit Bout It" debuted on the Billboard Hot 100 at number 67, and reached number 25 on the Hot R&B/Hip-Hop Songs chart. It also charted internationally, peaking at number 186 on the Billboard Global 200.

== Charts ==
Chart (2021)	Peak position
Global 200 (Billboard)	186
US Billboard Hot 100	67
US Hot R&B/Hip-Hop Songs (Billboard)	25
