= Kodak the Blessing =

Studio album by Kodak Black
- Released: June 12, 2026
- Recorded: 2025–2026
- Genre: Hip-hop
- Length: 76:05
- Labels: Vulture Love; Capitol
- Producers: 1Decastro; 1parkerhill; Ayo B; Ben Billions; BigMase Beats; Buddah Bless; C Clip Beatz; cosmicwitheillusion; d-lightbeats; damnsouljatheycantfwyou; Des Wright; Domin00; Dr. Zuez; Dyryk; DzyOnDaBeat; Ely "Ete" Lejuste; Eskey; FNZ; Fridayy; Helluva; J Gramm; kasimgotjuice; Lamar "Xairr" Alexidor; MasterChef; ProdHarryEast; SkipOnDaBeat; Snapz; TNTXD; TyeBeats; Yoda Yaelk; YungDza; Zachary Mighty

Kodak Black chronology
Just Getting Started (2025)	Kodak the Blessing (2026)

Kodak the Blessing is the ninth studio album by American rapper Kodak Black. It was released on June 12, 2026, through Vulture Love and Capitol Records. It has variously been described as Kodak's ninth studio album, or a commercial mixtape. The project features guest appearances from G Thugg, Shadea Charai, 1900Rugrat, Albee Al, Fridayy, Reese Youngn, Rylo Rodriguez, and Lil Crix. It serves as Kodak Black's first major full-length project of 2026 following Just Getting Started in 2025.

Kodak the Blessing was surprise-released to mark his 29th birthday. He has stated that the album is his last under a major label, and that he will be releasing music independently for the foreseeable future.

== Background ==
On June 9, 2026, Kodak Black announced the project's tracklist and cover art on Instagram. The cover art finds Kodak in Adam and Eve-inspired imagery.

== Track listing ==
Kodak the Blessing track listing
No.	Title	Writer(s)	Producer(s)	Length
1.	"Blessing"	Bill Kahan Kapri; Tyron Douglas	Buddah Bless	1:48
2.	"Move" (with G Thugg)	Kapri; Douglas	Buddah Bless	4:26
3.	"Chicken and Waffles"	Kapri; Douglas	Buddah Bless	2:30
4.	"Thunder Baby" (with Shadea Charai)	Kapri; Shadea Charai; Douglas	Buddah Bless	3:29
5.	"Nunchucks" (with 1900Rugrat)	Kapri; Edgar Ferrera; Miles Spiel	SkipOnDaBeat	2:29
6.	"Carrie P"	Kapri; Andrew O'Brien; Jesus Bobe	Ayo B, Dr. Zuez	2:41
7.	"Ima Be Cool"	Kapri; Benjamin Diehl	Ben Billions	3:19
8.	"Most of All"	Kapri; Diehl	Ben Billions	2:36
9.	"Prayers Call"	Kapri; Thomas Horton	TNTXD	3:24
10.	"Peter Roll" (with Albee Al)	Kapri; Albert Robinson; Dylan Taylor Cleary-Krell; Edis Selmani	Des Wright; YungDza	3:00
11.	"Loitering"	Kapri; Derek Garcia	Dyryk	3:15
12.	"Neckless"	Kapri; Garcia	Dyryk; Snapz	2:38
13.	"Running It Up"	Kapri; Garcia	FNZ; J Gramm	3:37
14.	"Better or Worse" (with Fridayy)	Kapri; Ferrera; Francis Leblanc	SkipOnDaBeat; Fridayy	3:01
15.	"Idols Turn Into Rivals"	Kapri; Ian Carroll Tague; Ilya Sergachev Sebastian Richard Krause	Eskey; cosmicwitheillusion; damnsouljatheycantfwyou	2:01
16.	"Who What"	Kapri; Gabriel Decastro; Harry East; Tague	1Decastro; ProdHarryEast; cosmicwitheillusion	2:14
17.	"Yak Gone Do It"	Kapri; Tye Gibson	TyeBeats	2:29
18.	"Killin Her"	Kapri; Douglas	Buddah Bless	2:03
19.	"Dearfield"	Kapri; Bobe	Dr. Zuez	2:25
20.	"Gift of Love"	Kapri; Anthony Howard; La Tavius Driver; Sean Fitzgerald Piatt, Jr.	DzyOnDaBeat; MasterChef; Yoda Yaelk	2:36
21.	"Handling the Death" (with Reese Youngn)	Kapri; Tyreese El	1parkerhill; BigMase Beats; d-lightbeats	4:42
22.	"Lemon Squeeze"	Kapri; Jermaine Smith	C Clip Beatz	1:40
23.	"Love Letters"	Kapri; Kasim Ali Walker	kasimgotjuice	2:49
24.	"Bodymore Murderland"	Kapri; Martin McCurtis	Helluva	3:02
25.	"Kumbaya"	Kapri; Carl Davidson Leon	Domin00	2:48
26.	"American Dream" (with Rylo Rodriguez and Lil Crix)	Kapri; Cristian Denis; Ely Lejuste; Lamar Alexidor; Ryan Preston Adams; Zachary Might	Ely "Ete" Lejuste; Lamar "Xairr" Alexidor; Zachary Mighty	5:03
Total length:				76:05

== Charts ==
Weekly Chart performance for Kodak the Blessing
Chart (2026)	Peak position
US Billboard 200	176
