= Super Gremlin =

2021 song by Kodak Black

- Single cover for 2021 David Guetta remix

Single by Kodak Black

from the album Sniper Gang Presents Syko Bob & Snapkatt: Nightmare Babies and Back for Everything
- Released: October 30, 2021
- Length: 3:21
- Label: Atlantic; Sniper Gang
- Songwriters: Bill Kapri; Jacob D. Canady; Maik Alexander Timmermann
- Producers: ATL Jacob; Jambo

Kodak Black singles chronology
"Killing the Rats" (2021)	"Super Gremlin" (2021)	"Love & War" (2021)

Music video
- "Super Gremlin" on YouTube

"Super Gremlin" is a song by American rapper Kodak Black, released on October 30, 2021, from the Sniper Gang label compilation Sniper Gang Presents Syko Bob & Snapkatt: Nightmare Babies, a Halloween-themed project. It impacted US urban contemporary radio on January 11, 2022, and peaked at number 3 on the Billboard Hot 100. The song is also included on Kodak's fourth studio album, Back for Everything.

== Background ==
The song is taken from Sniper Gang rappers Syko Bob and Snapkatt's album, Sniper Gang Presents Syko Bob & Snapkatt: Nightmare Babies, an 11-track project, of which Kodak appears on eight tracks. HotNewHipHop's Aron A. noted how fans praised the song "as return to form" for Kodak.

On December 3, 2021, YouTubers Zias and B. Lou released a video of Kodak joining them for a reaction video of "Super Gremlin". Portions of the video went viral due to Kodak's "peculiar", "odd" behavior. This led to Kodak responding to people accusing him of being on drugs, tweeting "Lol I B Fakin Like I'm Sleepy, Ion B High Guys I Get Drug Tested Consistently".

The vocal sample featured in the beginning and during the choruses is taken from a song called "Errror" by German indie rock band How to Loot Brazil.

== Critical reception ==
Revolt's Jon Powell called the song a standout from Nightmare Babies. In their listing of best hip-hop producers of 2021, XXL's Kemet High commended producer ATL Jacob's work during the year, exclaiming: "Most importantly, Jacob helped Kodak Black score his latest hit with 'Super Gremlin', a song that has since erupted more than a bottle of Coca-Cola with a handful of Mentos dropped into it".

== Music video and Cover art ==
The music video, released on November 1, 2021, is Halloween-themed, combining scenes of Kodak Black driving around with visuals of blood-stained rooms, a padded cell, crime scene tape, and a dominatrix. The Super Gremlin cover artwork was photographed by Ryan K. Rolo and Zac Schuss in Broward County, Florida.

== Other versions ==
Fellow American rapper Latto released "Super Gremlin Freestyle" on December 27, 2021, which she recorded in her Atlanta studio. It was accompanied by a video. Kevin Gates released "Super General Freestyle" on June 9, 2022 along the same track.

== Charts ==
=== Weekly charts ===
Chart performance for "Super Gremlin"
Chart (2021–2022)	Peak position
Canada Hot 100 (Billboard)	24
Global 200 (Billboard)	16
Ireland (IRMA)	98
New Zealand Hot Singles (RMNZ)	27
South Africa Streaming (TOSAC)	86
US Billboard Hot 100	3
US Hot R&B/Hip-Hop Songs (Billboard)	1
US Rhythmic Airplay (Billboard)	2

=== Year-end charts ===
2022 year-end chart performance for "Super Gremlin"
Chart (2022)	Position
Canada (Canadian Hot 100)	72
Global 200 (Billboard)	77
US Billboard Hot 100	9
US Hot R&B/Hip-Hop Songs (Billboard)	5
US Rhythmic (Billboard)	19

== Certifications ==
Certifications for "Super Gremlin"
Region	Certification	Certified units/sales
Canada (Music Canada)	Platinum	80,000^{‡}
New Zealand (RMNZ)	Platinum	30,000^{‡}
United Kingdom (BPI)	Silver	200,000^{‡}
United States (RIAA)	6× Platinum	6,000,000^{‡}
^{‡} Sales+streaming figures based on certification alone.

== Release history ==
Release history and formats for "Super Gremlin"
Region	Date	Format	Label	Ref.
Various	December 3, 2021	Digital download; streaming	Atlantic	
United States	January 11, 2022	Urban contemporary radio	Atlantic	
