= Love & War (song) =

2021 single by Kodak Black

Single by Kodak Black

from the album Back for Everything
- Released: December 15, 2021
- Length: 3:59
- Label: Sniper Gang; Atlantic
- Songwriters: Bill Kapri; Steve Tirogene; Julian Gramma
- Producers: Pompano Puff; J Gramm

Kodak Black singles chronology
"Mopstick" (2021)	"Love & War" (2021)	"Anthem" (2021)

"Love & War" is a song by American rapper Kodak Black, released on December 15, 2021, as the lead single from his fourth studio album Back for Everything (2022). It was produced by Pompano Puff and J Gramm.

== Background and composition ==
The cover art of the song shows Kodak Black holding hands with his girlfriend as a heart of smoke explodes in the sky, with soldiers at war behind them.

The chorus of the song previously leaked in 2019, following which it went viral on the video-sharing app TikTok and was also used for Black's feature on the song "On the Low" by Shoreline Mafia in 2020. Lyrically, the song finds Kodak expressing his feelings toward a girl, saying she wants "love" but he wants "war". The production of the song contains xylophone.

== Critical reception ==
Preezy Brown of Vibe regarded the song as among the "standouts" that "help close out Back For Everything on a high note". On the other hand, Jayson Buford of HipHopDX wrote, "'Love & War,' the last record, is abominable. With his xylophone production, it's a SoundCloud snippet that should've stayed there."

== Charts ==
Chart performance for "Love & War"
Chart (2022)	Peak position
US Bubbling Under Hot 100 (Billboard)	8
US Hot R&B/Hip-Hop Songs (Billboard)	48

== Certifications ==
Certifications for "Love & War"
Region	Certification	Certified units/sales
New Zealand (RMNZ)	Gold	15,000^{‡}
United States (RIAA)	Platinum	1,000,000^{‡}
^{‡} Sales+streaming figures based on certification alone.
