= I Wish (Kodak Black song) =

Promotional single by Kodak Black

Promotional single by Kodak Black

from the album Back for Everything
- Released: February 22, 2022
- Length: 2:45
- Label: Sniper Gang; Atlantic
- Songwriters: Bill Kapri; Willie Norwood, Jr.; LaShawn Daniels; Rodney Jerkins; Freddie Jerkins
- Producer: Saved by da Bell

Music video
- "I Wish" on YouTube

"I Wish" is a song by American rapper Kodak Black, released on February 22, 2022, as the second promotional single from his fourth studio album Back for Everything (2022). Produced by Saved by da Bell, it contains a sample of "One Wish" by Ray J.

== Background ==
Earlier in February 2022, Kodak Black previewed the lyrics of the song on Twitter.

== Composition and lyrics ==
Over the sample, Kodak Black reflects on the difficulties he has faced and his struggle to stay out of trouble: "I wish I could stop thuggin' for real / Leave the streets without me bein' killed / For so long, I been goin' on drills / Drinkin' that lean, pour it straight out the seal". He mentions being pardoned by President Donald Trump, wanting to care for his son, and the names of many members of his entourage.

== Music video ==
An accompanying music video was released alongside the song. Directed by Kodak Black and shot by Cameraman Chris, it sees Kodak hanging out with his crew outside late at night with two-by-fours. In addition, he shows off his jewelry and expensive cars, and poses in front of and boards a private jet.

== Charts ==
Chart performance for "I Wish"
Chart (2022)	Peak position
US Billboard Hot 100	90
US Hot R&B/Hip-Hop Songs (Billboard)	33
