= Skrt =

Single by Kodak Black

Single by Kodak Black

from the album Heart of the Projects
- Released: December 25, 2014
- Length: 3:44
- Label: Dollaz N Dealz
- Songwriters: Dieuson Octave; Edgar Ferrera
- Producer: SkipOnDaBeat

Kodak Black singles chronology
"Skrilla" (2014)	"Skrt" (2014)	"I Just Might" (2015)

Music video
- "Skrt" on YouTube

"Skrt" (stylized in all caps; pronounced "skirt") is a song by the American rapper Kodak Black. It was released in December 2014 and is the third single from his mixtape, Heart of the Projects (2014). It was produced by SkipOnDaBeat. In October 2015, the song helped Kodak Black gain recognition, when a video of the Canadian rapper Drake dancing to it went viral.

== Background ==
The single was released on December 25, 2014, and a music video for the song was released on October 19, 2015. Four days later, on October 23, 2015, Drake posted a video on Instagram of him dancing to the song in his private jet. The video became popular, leading to Kodak Black achieving national popularity.

== Composition ==
Elias Leight wrote in The Fader that the song's beat "combines a stream of percussion and a few floating keyboard notes", and noted "fierce, distressed qualities to Kodak's loneliness". Zara Golden called the track melancholy.

== Remix ==
The Canadian rapper Roy Woods released a remix of the song on January 30, 2016.

== Charts ==
Chart performance for "Skrt"
Chart (2016–2017)	Peak position
US Bubbling Under Hot 100 (Billboard)	11

== Certifications ==
Certifications for "Skrt"
Region	Certification	Certified units/sales
United States (RIAA)	2× Platinum	2,000,000^{‡}
^{‡} Sales+streaming figures based on certification alone.
