= Just Getting Started (Kodak Black album) =

Studio album by Kodak Black
- Released: October 31, 2025
- Recorded: 2024–2025
- Genre: Hip-hop
- Length: 64:51
- Labels: Vulture Love; Capitol
- Producers: FnZ; Pharrell Williams; 206DEREK; Ayo B; Ben Heet; Buddah Bless; Casozworld; Chef Boyar Dru; Clip Beats; Chriz Beatz; Domin00; Dr. Zeuz; Dyryk; Haze; J Gramm; Jabz; KasimGotJuice; Kuttabeatz; Marko Lenz; MIA JAY C; Paradise Don't Drown; Pensión; RBP; Ricky V; Sean John; Schife; Seth The Chef; TnTXD; YodaYae1K

Kodak Black chronology
| Gift for the Streets (2024) | Just Getting Started (2025) | Kodak the Blessing (2026) |

Just Getting Started is the eighth studio album by American rapper Kodak Black. It was released on October 31, 2025, through Vulture Love and Capitol Records. The album features guest appearances from artists such as Chance the Rapper, Pharrell Williams, Gunna, Don Toliver, and Lil Yachty. It serves as Kodak Black's first major full-length project of 2025 following several releases in 2024.

== Background ==
Following a prolific year in 2024 with the release of multiple projects, Kodak Black announced Just Getting Started in October 2025, along the release of the first single of the album entitled Still Get Chanel.

Kodak Black promoted the project with Halloween-themed concerts in Florida shortly after release.

== Track listing ==
Just Getting Started track listing
| No. | Title | Writer(s) | Producer(s) | Length |
|---|---|---|---|---|
| 1. | "Project Blue" | Bill Kahan Kapri | YodaYae1K | 2:15 |
| 2. | "Still Get Chanel" (with Chance the Rapper) | Kapri; Chance Jonathan Bennett; Jesus Bobe | Dr. Zeuz | 3:19 |
| 3. | "No Flaggin" | Kapri; Andrew Brenner; Louis Jacques; Jacob Polecaro; Derek Garcia | Dyryk; Sean John; Paradise Don't Drown; Chef Boyar Dru | 2:45 |
| 4. | "Mumble Rap" (with Pharrell Williams) | Kapri; Pharrell Williams | Pharrell Williams | 1:51 |
| 5. | "All Black Rolex" | Kapri; Jermaine Smith | Clip Beats | 3:30 |
| 6. | "Endless Nights" (with Gunna) | Kapri; Sergio Kitchens; Kasim Ali Walker | KasimGotJuice | 2:38 |
| 7. | "Really Liv’n" | Kapri; Garcia; Bobe; Michael Richard Stadie | Dyryk; Dr. Zeuz; Ricky V | 2:15 |
| 8. | "YMCA" | Kapri | Dyryk; RBP | 3:56 |
| 9. | "Shootin Craps" (with Lil Yachty) | Kapri; Miles McCollum; Jason Tyler Baker; Seth Jones; Ty-Ron Douglas | Buddah Bless; Jabz; Seth The Chef | 2:32 |
| 10. | "Imma Shoot" | Kapri | Dyryk; RBP; Ben Heet; MIA JAY C; Casozworld | 3:26 |
| 11. | "Who You Seeing Tonight" (with Don Toliver) | Kapri; Caleb Toliver; Edgar Ferrera; Jordan Hollywood; Derek Anderson | 206DEREK | 3:49 |
| 12. | "Calculated Steppin" | Kapri; Garcia | Dyryk; RBP | 2:22 |
| 13. | "Jungle Fever" | Kapri; Bobe; Mark Nikolaev | Dr. Zeuz; Marko Lenz | 2:31 |
| 14. | "Time To Be Free" | Kapri; Isaac Deboni; Michael Mulé; Julian Gramm | FnZ; J Gramm | 2:56 |
| 15. | "Prison Deform" | Kapri; Deboni; Mulé; Thomas Horton | TnTXD; FnZ | 9:19 |
| 16. | "The Better" | Kapri; Andrew O'Brien; Bobe | Dr. Zeuz; Ayo B | 3:04 |
| 17. | "Yes Indeed" (with TTO K.T. & Reign) | Kapri | Kuttabeatz | 2:49 |
| 18. | "Savage Compassion" | Kapri | Domin00 | 3:09 |
| 19. | "Keys To The City (Extended)" | Kapri; Ian Smith | Schife | 3:18 |
| 20. | "All Love" | Kapri; Douglas | Pensión; Chriz Beatz; Haze | 3:12 |
| Total length: | | | | 64:51 |

== Charts ==
Weekly Chart performance for Just Getting Started
| Chart (2025–2026) | Peak position |
|---|---|
| Nigerian Albums (TurnTable) | 39 |
| US Billboard 200 | 77 |
| US Top R&B/Hip-Hop Albums (Billboard) | 23 |
| US Top Rap Albums (Billboard) | 17 |
