= Back for Everything =

Studio album by Kodak Black
- Released: February 25, 2022
- Length: 57:10
- Label: Atlantic
- Producers: ATL Jacob; Avedon; Ayo B; BandPlay; Berler; Boi-1da; Buddah Bless; Byrd; Cubeatz; Dr. Zeuz; Dyryk; DzyOnDaBeat; Jahaan Sweet; Jambo; June Nawakii; KasimGotJuice; Lee Major; London on da Track; Max Perry; Mondo; Murda Beatz; Mxller; Pvlace; RBP; Saved by da Bell; Sean Momberger; SkipOnDaBeat; Snapz; Sspiketrap; Starrah; Tymaz; Vinylz; Zaytoven

Kodak Black chronology
Happy Birthday Kodak (2021)	Back for Everything (2022)	Kutthroat Bill: Vol. 1 (2022)

Singles from Back for Everything
- 1. "Love & War" Released: December 15, 2021; 2. "Usain Boo" Released: April 5, 2022

Back for Everything is the fourth studio album by American rapper Kodak Black. It was released through Atlantic Records on February 25, 2022. The album features a sole guest appearance from Lil Durk, who appears on the fifteenth track, "Take You Back". The production on the album was handled by multiple producers including Buddah Bless, London on da Track, Murda Beatz, Scott Storch, Zaytoven, Boi-1da, Vinylz, and Lee Major among others.

Back for Everything was preceded by the single "Love & War" and the promotional singles "Grinding All Season" and "I Wish". The cover art of Back for Everything pays homage to the movie franchise Back to the Future. The album received generally positive reviews from critics and was a commercial success. It debuted at number two on the US Billboard 200 chart, earning 60,000 album-equivalent units in its first week.

== Release and promotion ==
Kodak announced the album and its release date on February 8, 2022, with the pre-order on Apple Music a few days prior to the announcement. The tracklist was revealed on February 24, 2022, the day before its release.

=== Singles ===
The lead single of the album, "Love & War", was released on December 15, 2021. The song "Super Gremlin", which is a part of the Sniper Gang label compilation album, Sniper Gang Presents Syko Bob & Snapkatt: Nightmare Babies (2021), is also included on the album. The first promotional single, "Grinding All Season", was released on February 8, 2022. The second promotional single, "I Wish", was released on February 22, 2022. On the day before the album's release, Kodak's mother also got a Sniper Gang tattoo in honor of her son's release, in which Kodak posted a video to Instagram with the caption: "Ma Jus Snapped & Tatted SG On Her". On April 5, 2022, "Usain Boo" was released to US rhythmic radio as the album's second single.

== Critical reception ==
Professional ratings
Review scores
Source	Rating
AllMusic	3/5 stars
HipHopDX	2.5/5

Writing for Billboard, Jason Lipshutz felt that "Back for Everything showcases Kodak's ability to pluck pop-ready melodies out of ethereal beats, his signature croak sounding more nimble than before as he reflects on his fame, personal ordeals and future plans; with few guest stars, the project is intimate in a way that Kodak Black, a fascinating hip hop superstar demand". Preezy Brown of Vibe believed that the album "is a reminder of the magic the Floridian is capable of creating when fully focused and locked in", adding that "yet, the lack of contributors isn't an impediment for Back For Everything, as Kodak asserts himself well throughout the album's 19 songs".

AllMusic also wrote that on some tracks, "his performances tend toward the generic, stumbling through by-the-numbers bragging about his wealth or forgettable tales of struggles and hardship coming up. Though Back for Everything is still enjoyable as a nearly hour-long project, Kodak Black's performances run out of inspiration long before the production, and the entire album could benefit from an edit that cuts out roughly under half of the inferior tracks to let the stronger ones shine". Jayson Buford of HipHopDX described the album as "a mediocre record that doesn't let the listener in enough to evoke empathy, nor does it offer a path for Kodak to seek redemption, a theme he's toyed with on other records but seems to have rejected this time."

== Commercial performance ==
Back for Everything debuted at number two on the US Billboard 200 chart, earning 60,000 album-equivalent units (including 3,000 copies in pure album sales) in its first week. This became Kodak Black's fourth US top-ten album on the chart. The album also accumulated a total of equaling 84 million on-demand official streams of the set's tracks. In its second week, the album dropped to number four on the chart, earning an additional 37,000 units. On July 11, 2022, the album was certified gold by the Recording Industry Association of America (RIAA) for combined sales and album-equivalent units of over 500,000 units in the United States.

== Track listing ==
Back for Everything track listing
No.	Title	Writer(s)	Producer(s)	Length
1.	"Let Me Know"	Bill Kapri; Derek Garcia; Max Perry; Russell Pochop; Emmanuel Yeboah	Dyryk; Perry; RBP; Mxller	3:20
2.	"Back for Everything"	Kapri; Tyron Douglas, Sr.; Armond Kendrick	Buddah Bless; Mondo	2:47
3.	"Grinding All Season"	Kapri; Jahaan Sweet	Sweet	2:50
4.	"Smackers"	Kapri; London Holmes; Tim Gomringer; Kevin Gomringer	London on da Track; Cubeatz	2:11
5.	"On Everything"	Kapri; Garcia; Denis Berger; Niles Groce; Nick Varvatsoulis	Dyryk; Pvlace; Snapz	3:12
6.	"Purple Stamp"	Kapri; Shane Lindstrom; Alex Bottero; Oscar Braojos	Murda Beatz; Sspiketrap; Tymaz	2:19
7.	"Midas Touch"	Kapri; Kasim Walker	KasimGotJuice	3:00
8.	"Sink My Ship"	Kapri; Scott Storch; Vincent van den Ende	Storch; Avedon	3:16
9.	"Usain Boo"	Kapri; Brittany Hazzard; Eamon Doyle; Kirk Robinson; Yared Williams; Daniel Celestin	Starrah; June Nawakii	3:06
10.	"Vulnerable (Free Cool)"	Kapri; Krishon Gaines; Leutrim Beqiri	BandPlay; Byrd	2:21
11.	"Elite Division"	Kapri; Xavier Dotson	Zaytoven	2:28
12.	"Omega"	Kapri; Anthony Howard; Brian Watters; Joey Lopez	DzyOnDaBeat	3:09
13.	"Hitting Houses"	Kapri; Garcia; Perry; Pochop; Samuel Berler	Dyryk; Perry; RBP; Berler	3:39
14.	"Love Isn't Enough"	Kapri; Andrew O'Brien; Jesus Bobe	Ayo B; Dr. Zeuz	2:27
15.	"Take You Back" (featuring Lil Durk)	Kapri; Durk Banks; Edgar Ferrera	SkipOnDaBeat	3:21
16.	"He Love the Streets"	Kapri; Matthew Samuels; Anderson Hernandez; Leigh Elliott; Sean Momberger	Boi-1da; Vinylz; Lee Major; Momberger	3:31
17.	"Super Gremlin"	Kapri; Jacob Canady; Malik Timmermann	ATL Jacob; Jambo	3:20
18.	"I Wish"	Kapri; Willie Norwood, Jr.; LaShawn Daniels; Rodney Jerkins; Freddie Jerkins	Saved by da Bell	2:45
19.	"Love & War"	Kapri; Julian Gramma; Steve Tirogene	J Gramm; Pompano Puff	3:59
Total length:				57:10

== Charts ==
=== Weekly charts ===
Weekly chart performance for Back for Everything
Chart (2022)	Peak position
Canadian Albums (Billboard)	15
US Billboard 200	2
US Top R&B/Hip-Hop Albums (Billboard)	1

=== Year-end charts ===
2022 year-end chart performance for Back for Everything
Chart (2022)	Position
US Billboard 200	100
US Top R&B/Hip-Hop Albums (Billboard)	47

== Certifications ==
Certifications for Back for Everything
Region	Certification	Certified units/sales
United States (RIAA)	Platinum	1,000,000^{‡}
^{‡} Sales+streaming figures based on certification alone.
