= Kodak Black =

American rapper (born 1997)

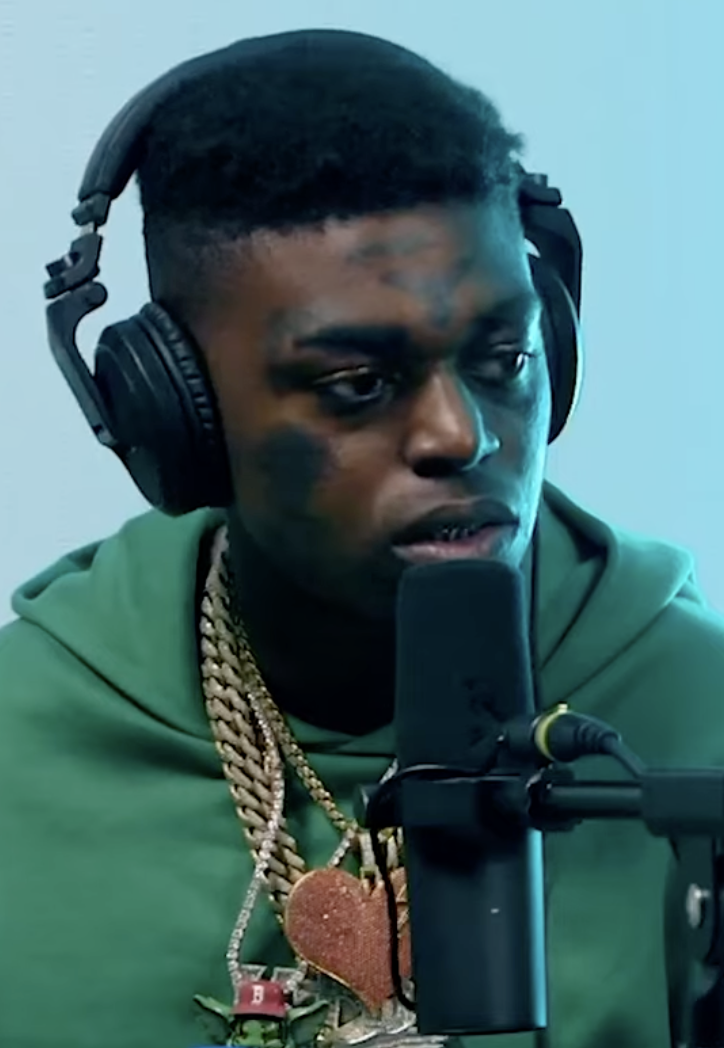
- Kodak Black in February 2022

Background information
- Also known as: Yak; J-Black
- Born: Dieuson Octave; June 11, 1997 (age 29); Pompano Beach, Florida, U.S.
- Genres: Southern hip-hop; trap; gangsta rap
- Occupations: Rapper; singer; songwriter
- Works: Kodak Black discography
- Years active: 2009–present
- Labels: Capitol; Sniper Gang; Dollaz N Dealz; Atlantic
- Children: 5
- Website: officialkodakblack.com

Bill Kahan Kapri (born Dieuson Octave; June 11, 1997), known professionally as Kodak Black, is an American rapper and singer-songwriter. Born and raised in Pompano Beach, Florida, he gained initial recognition following the release of his 2014 songs "No Flockin" and "Skrt", both of which led him to sign a recording contract with Atlantic Records. The former received double platinum certification by the Recording Industry of America (RIAA) while the latter received platinum certification; "No Flockin" marked his first entry on the Billboard Hot 100 two years later as a sleeper hit.

His 2017 single "Tunnel Vision" saw further commercial success, peaking at number six on the Billboard Hot 100. It preceded the release of his debut studio album Painting Pictures (2017), which peaked at number three on the Billboard 200. His debut commercial mixtape (and fifth overall), Project Baby 2, was released that same year and peaked at number two on the chart, also spawning the triple platinum-certified single "Roll in Peace" (featuring XXXTentacion). His second album, Dying to Live (2018), yielded his furthest commercial success; it peaked atop the Billboard 200 and spawned the single "Zeze" (featuring Travis Scott and Offset), which peaked at number two on the Billboard Hot 100, received sextuple platinum certification by the RIAA, and remains his highest-charting song. Following the release of his third album Bill Israel (2020) while incarcerated, his 2021 single, "Super Gremlin", peaked at number three on the Billboard Hot 100. It was included on his fourth album, Back for Everything (2022), followed by his fifth album and final project for Atlantic, Pistolz & Pearlz (2023). He then signed with Capitol Records to release his next three albums—When I Was Dead (2023), Just Getting Started (2025), and Kodak the Blessing (2026), before announcing that he was going to release music independently.

Kapri's career has been marked by periods of mainstream success, as well as public controversies and numerous legal issues. Although he remains a largely successful artist and a high-profile figure within the American hip-hop scene, his career has been marred by a lengthy criminal record. Notable criminal cases involving Kapri include a 2016 rape case in South Carolina, in which he made a plea bargain in 2021 to the lesser offenses of assault and battery and was sentenced to probation. In 2019, he was arrested for making false statements regarding possession of firearms and was sentenced to nearly four years in federal prison; his sentence was commuted by President Donald Trump in 2021. Kapri has continued to face further arrests and legal issues since his commutation.

== Early life ==
Kodak Black was born Dieuson Octave on June 11, 1997, to Haitian immigrant Marcelene Octave in Pompano Beach, Florida. He was raised by his mother in Golden Acres, a public housing project in Pompano Beach. Kodak Black is a known childhood friend of fellow Golden Acres native and professional football player Lamar Jackson; the two went to elementary school together and were close friends growing up.

Kodak Black started rapping in elementary school and began to go to a local trap house after school to record music. He spent his youth reading thesauruses and dictionaries to further his vocabulary. Kodak Black frequently participated in brawls and breaking and entering with his friends. He was expelled from school in the fifth grade for fighting and was arrested for auto theft while in middle school. About his upbringing, he said that he was given two options: "sell drugs with a gun on his hip or rap".

From the age of six, Kodak Black used the nickname "Black". He also used the nickname "Lil' Black". When he joined Instagram he chose the username "Kodak Black", "...'cause you know Kodak, that's pictures and all that." This later became his stage name when he started to rap and is the name favored by his fans.

== Career ==
=== 2009–2015: Beginnings and Project Baby ===
In 2009, at age 12, Kodak Black joined a rap group called Brutal Youngnz, under the stage name J-Black. He then joined a local rap group called The Kolyons. In December 2013, Kodak Black released his first mixtape, Project Baby, followed in December 2014 with the mixtape Heart of the Projects, and in December 2015 with the mixtape Institution.

In October 2015, Canadian rapper Drake posted a video of himself dancing to one of Kodak Black's songs, "Skrt", which helped him gain popularity despite objections from other rappers such as Earl Sweatshirt. That same month, he signed a deal with Atlantic Records. In May 2016, Kodak Black and fellow American rapper Lil Uzi Vert announced their intention to partner for a national tour called the "Parental Advisory Tour"; however, Kodak Black did not appear on the tour.

=== 2016–2017: Breakout, Painting Pictures, and Project Baby 2 ===
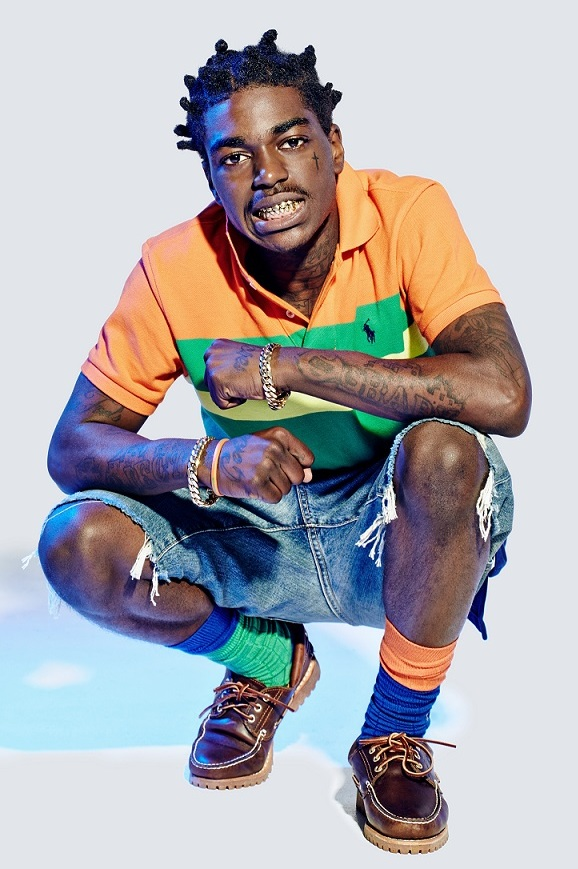
Kodak Black in 2016

In May 2016, he guest appeared on French Montana's single "Lockjaw", which peaked at 23 on Billboard's Hot R&B/Hip-Hop Songs chart and was included on Montana's commercial mixtape MC4. In August 2016, Kodak Black's single "Skrt" reached number 10 on Billboard's "Bubbling Under R&B/Hip-Hop Singles" chart. In June 2016, he released his fourth mixtape, Lil B.I.G. Pac, which became his first mixtape to chart on Billboard, reaching number 49 on the "Top R&B/Hip-Hop Albums" chart and number 18 on the Heatseakers Albums chart.

In June 2016, Kodak Black was named one of XXL magazine's "2016 Freshman Class".

In August 2016, Kodak Black was criticized when a studio session video was released showing him ridiculing dark-skinned black women with lyrics that implied those women were less attractive than light-skinned black women, which is considered a type of misogynoir—anti-Black hatred towards women.

In 2016, Kodak Black released the song "Can I" while incarcerated.

On February 17, 2017, Kodak Black released the single "Tunnel Vision". The song debuted at number 27 and peaked at number 6, becoming Kodak Black's first top 10 hit on the US Billboard Hot 100 and number 17 on the Canadian Hot 100.

On March 31, 2017, Kodak Black released his debut studio album Painting Pictures. The album reached 3 on the Billboard 200 and sold 71,000 equivalent units first week, a record for Kodak Black. While discussing rappers and fellow 2016 XXL Freshmen, Lil Uzi Vert and Lil Yachty, Kodak Black created controversy when he insulted them whilst conducting a livestream on Instagram. Lil Uzi Vert replied stating that he was not bothered by the insult and that he still "fucked with" Kodak Black. He released the follow-up to Project Baby, Project Baby 2, on August 18, 2017. In November 2017, Kodak Black released a deluxe version of Project Baby 2 titled Project Baby 2: All Grown Up. The single from the deluxe version, "Codeine Dreaming", peaked at number 52 on the Billboard Hot 100.

=== 2018–2020: Heart Break Kodak, Dying to Live, and Bill Israel ===
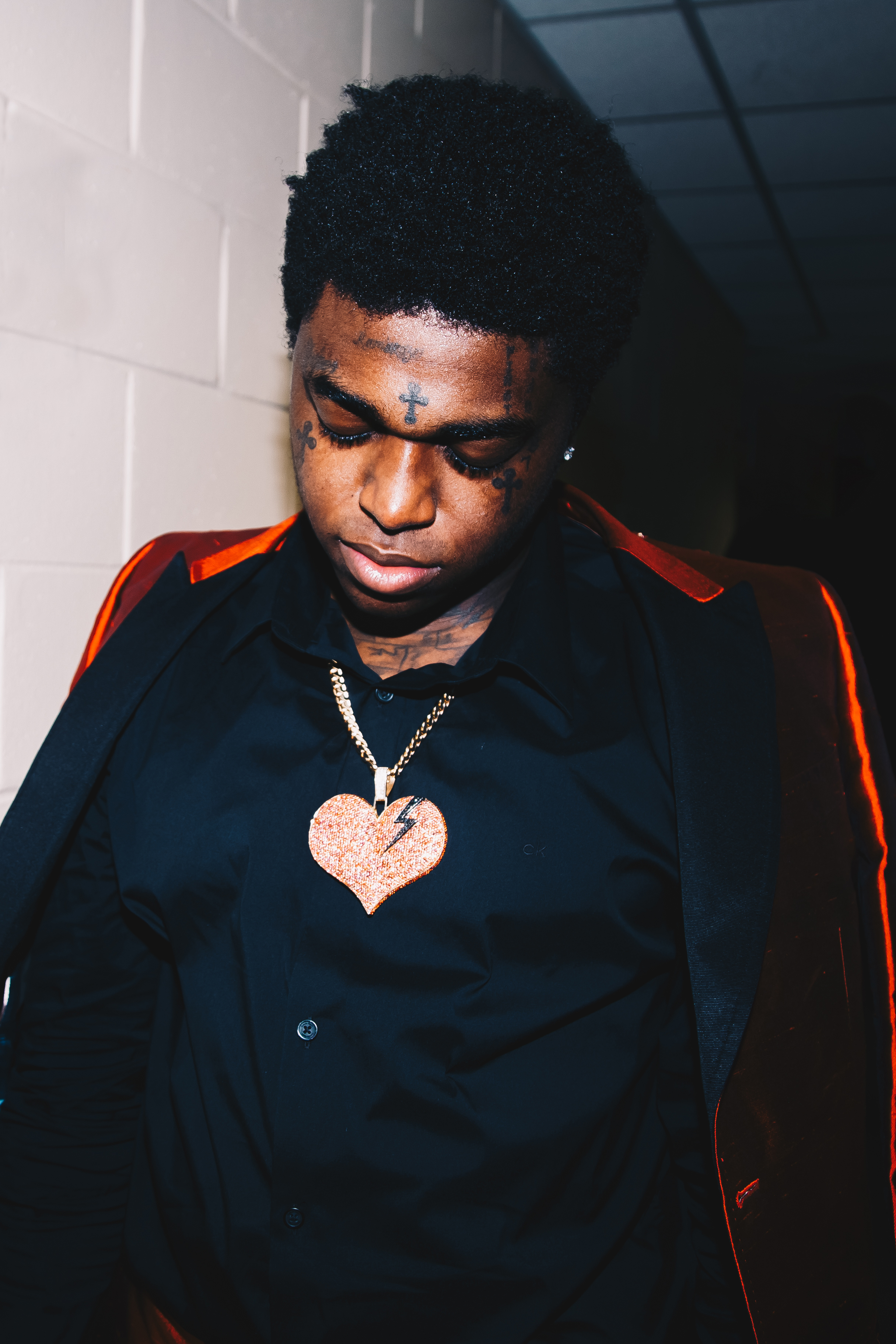
Kodak Black in 2018

In January 2018, Kodak Black was arrested following a raid on his Florida home. Kodak Black later released the Heart Break Kodak mixtape on Valentine's Day.

On December 14, 2018, Kodak Black released his second album Dying to Live. The album was led by the successful single "Zeze" which featured rappers Travis Scott and Offset, as well as "If I'm Lyin, I'm Flyin", "Take One" and "Calling My Spirit". The album also featured rapper Lil Pump on "Gnarly", rapper Juice WRLD on "MoshPit", and paid tribute to deceased rapper XXXTentacion. "Zeze" peaked at number 2 on the Hot 100, then "Calling My Spirit", also from the album, peaked at number 46. Dying to Live as a whole was on the Billboard 200 chart for 15 weeks, and peaked at number 1 for a week.

On October 25, 2019, Kodak Black released "Zombie" with NLE Choppa and DB Omerta. On February 14, 2020, Kodak Black released "Because of You", followed by a music video for the song. Kodak Black then claimed that if the song was certified platinum by his birthday, then he would release an album. On May 12, 2020, he released the single "Vultures Cry 2", featuring WizDaWizard and Mike Smiff.

On November 11, 2020, Kodak returned with his third album, Bill Israel, while serving a prison sentence.

=== 2020–present: Prison release, Haitian Boy Kodak, Back for Everything and Kutthroat Bill: Vol. 1 ===
On January 23, 2021, he released the single, "Last Day In", in which he addresses his release from prison due to his pardon from President Donald Trump. He released the single, "Every Balmain", on February 6, 2021, in which he discusses life post-prison. On February 19, he was featured on Lil Yachty's single, "Hit Bout It", which was released alongside a music video.

Kodak released a mixtape titled Haitian Boy Kodak on May 14, 2021. The project's cover art pays tribute to his Haitian pride. Kodak voiced frustration at the mixtape only moving 22,000 units in its first week, claiming that listeners had turned their backs on gangsta rap. Kodak released his next project, Happy Birthday Kodak, on June 11, 2021, his twenty-fourth birthday. On November 1, 2021, Kodak released a music video for the song "Super Gremlin", from Syko Bob and Snapkatt's Halloween-themed mixtape, Sniper Gang Presents Syko Bob & Snapkatt: Nightmare Babies, an 11-track project, of which Kodak appears on eight tracks. "Super Gremlin" became a hit, peaking at number five on the Billboard Hot 100. The song was also included on Kodak's fourth studio album Back for Everything, which released on February 25, 2022. The project proceeded to peak at number 2 on the Billboard 200.

Months later, following the release of his viral singles "Walk/Spin", Kodak announced his departure from Atlantic Records and that he would sign to Capitol Records for an eight-figure record deal. Kodak's final project with Atlantic, Kutthroat Bill: Vol. 1 was released on October 28, 2022. The mixtape proceeded to peak at number 8 on the Billboard 200.

Kodak Black collaborated with Kendrick Lamar on "Silent Hill" from the latter's double album, Mr. Morale & the Big Steppers (2022). Due to Kodak Black's conviction involving the 2016 sexual assault case which was reduced to first-degree assault, both performers generated greater controversy.

Kodak is set to appear in the upcoming video game Grand Theft Auto VI as a non-player character.

== Musical style ==
Kodak Black's music is frequently about "previous and future criminal misdeeds", and he stated that he has been influenced by rappers Boosie Badazz and Chief Keef.

A writer for The New Yorker magazine described his "manifestly youthful voice" and "mutinous sound", and stated "Kapri joins other young rappers who have rejected an old-school emphasis on lyrical variety, individualism, and personal catharsis".

In 2016, a music critic wrote in The Fader that Kodak Black "articulates the constant state of affliction that living in a poverty-stricken environment can mean. He makes emotionally intelligent observations in a manner reminiscent of teenage artists of the '90s, such as Mobb Deep and Lil Wayne, whose voices were valued as genuine illustrations of life in their corners of America."

Kodak Black has been frequently described as a mumble rapper.

== Personal life ==
In 2014, Kodak Black stated that he was working towards his high school diploma at Blanche Ely High School in Pompano Beach.

During his incarceration, Kodak Black began to identify as a Hebrew Israelite after a priest who conducts prison ministry studied scripture with him. He later filed to change his name to Bill Kahan Blanco, with Kahan supposedly being an alternative spelling of kohen, a term used in Judaism to refer to priests who descend from the prophet Aaron, the brother of Moses. On May 2, 2018, he legally changed his name from "Dieuson Octave" to "Bill Kahan Kapri".

In June 2017, he wrote on Instagram about his preference for light-skinned women over those with dark skin. He also stated in an interview that actress Keke Palmer was "straight", but that he "don't really like Black girls like that". Some Twitter users responded negatively, provoking Kodak Black to delete both his Instagram and Twitter accounts. Kodak Black also stated that light-skinned women are easier to break down, black women are "too gutter", and that he does not like his skin complexion.

In June 2018, Kodak Black earned his GED while in prison.

On February 6, 2021, Kodak returned to social media with a new hairstyle and a slimmer figure.

On February 12, 2022, Kodak Black was shot during a fight outside a Los Angeles Italian restaurant where Justin Bieber was hosting a Super Bowl-week party.

Kapri endorsed the Donald Trump 2024 presidential campaign, releasing the single "ONBOA47RD" with New York rapper Fivio Foreign in support of Trump.

=== Philanthropy ===
On October 1, 2018, Kodak Black donated $10,000 to the Jack and Jill Children's center, which is a provider of early children's education. In November 2018, Kodak Black announced that he was building a school in Haiti.

On December 20, 2018, Kodak Black donated enough money to Paradise Childcare in Broward County, Florida, to provide gifts for 150 children in the area. In addition, he also donated $5,000 for the organization's annual Christmas party.

In late 2018, he donated $2,500 to the family of South Carolina police officer Terrence Carraway, who was killed in a shootout on duty. On May 3, 2019, Kodak Black donated $12,500 to Paige Cook, to help with the girl's goal to give pencils and notebooks to all 7,600 students in the Cleburne Independent School District in Texas, a low-income district. In 2018, Paige raised enough money to buy over 40,000 pencils. In the wake of the 2019 STEM School Highlands Ranch shooting, Kodak Black's lawyer reached out to the family of Kendrick Ray Castillo, who was shot and killed after lunging at the attacker, on May 11, and offered to pay for Castillo's funeral and set aside an annual $10,000 scholarship for any student wishing to go to college for science or engineering. His lawyer stated that the family had not yet responded.

Kodak also donated $50,000 to Gekyume Onfroy, the son of fellow Broward County rapper XXXTentacion. Kodak Black and XXXTentacion were close personal friends and frequent collaborators up until the latter's murder in 2018.

In February 2021, Kodak posted a video to Twitter where he and his lawyer Bradford Cohen stated that they had informed the FBI in Miami that Kodak would cover tuition costs for the two children of late FBI agent Laura Schwartzenberger and the child of late FBI agent Daniel Alfin, both of whom died on duty.

In July 2025, Kodak was awarded a key to the city of Pompano Beach, Florida, his hometown.

== Legal issues ==
=== 2015–2017 ===
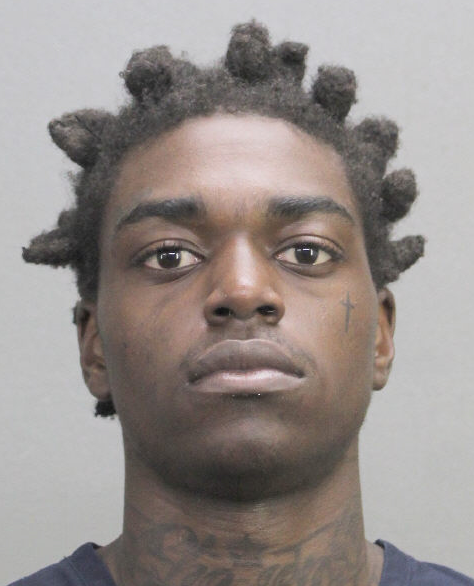
Kodak Black's mugshot in May 2016

Kodak Black was placed into a youth detention center three times in one year, and then placed on probation.

In October 2015, he was arrested in Pompano Beach and charged with robbery, battery, false imprisonment of a child, and possession of cannabis. He was later released. He was later arrested once again on December 25, 2015 in St. Lucie County on charges relating to drugs.

In April 2016, Kodak Black was arrested in Hallandale Beach, Florida, and charged with possession of a weapon by a convicted felon, possession of marijuana, and fleeing from officers.

The following month in May 2016, he was arrested in Broward County, Florida, and charged with armed robbery and false imprisonment. He was detained in custody.

In August 2016, he appeared in court in Fort Lauderdale, Florida. Several executives from Atlantic Records attended the court; vice-president Michael Kushner commented "Black has a bright future as a recording artist". Kodak Black pleaded no contest to all charges and under a plea agreement was to be placed on house arrest for one year, have five years' probation, perform community service as required, and take anger management classes. He would also be permitted to tour internationally. Before his release from Broward Main Jail, police discovered two outstanding criminal warrants, the first from Florence, South Carolina alleging felony criminal sexual conduct, the second from St. Lucie County, Florida alleging two counts of misdemeanor marijuana possession. Kodak Black was not released from jail.

In September 2016, Kodak Black pleaded no contest to two misdemeanor drug charges and was sentenced to four months in jail. He was credited for time spent in custody awaiting trial and was required to serve 120 days. He was also suspended from driving for one year.

Kodak Black was released from jail in Florida and was then transported to Florence, South Carolina, to face charges of sexual assault. According to the victim, who reported the incident to her school nurse, she had attended a February 2016 performance by Kodak Black at "Treasure City" in Florence, after which she accompanied him to his hotel room where he is alleged to have told her he "couldn't help himself" as he tore off her clothes, bit her repeatedly, and raped her as she screamed for help. Kodak Black was released from custody in South Carolina on December 1, 2016, after posting a $100,000 bond, but returned to court on February 8, 2017. About Kodak Black, the Miami New Times asked: "is he the product of larger societal problems, having been raised on a steady diet of misogynistic rap lyrics?" Within hours of release, he recorded and released "There He Go", a single which mentions his recent release from jail:

Just hopped off the plane I just got out about a day ago
Everybody love me, when they see me they be like, "There he go!"
Got me a new lady, we 'bout to take a trip to Mexico
Crackers took my .40 so I'm 'bout to go buy a Draco

In February 2017, Kodak Black was arrested again for violation of his probation. He was held without bond and his musical tour was postponed.

In April 2017, Kodak Black was indicted by a grand jury in South Carolina, and was scheduled to go on trial in April 2019 in Florence, South Carolina on a charge of first-degree criminal sexual conduct. This was later postponed. Also in April 2017, he appeared in court in Florida, where his anger management counselor Ramona Sanchez spoke about him disrupting her class. Sanchez said he was constantly burping during her class, and when asked to leave, he refused. When Sanchez threatened to call 911, he grabbed her phone and her wrist. The counselor recommended that Kodak Black participate in individual therapy instead of group therapy.

On May 4, 2017, he was sentenced for violating his house arrest to 364 days in the Broward County Jail, with the possibility of an early release if he completes a life skills course. He was released on June 5, 2017. He will remain on house arrest for one year, and five years of probation.

=== 2018–present ===
Kodak Black was arrested inside his Pembroke Pines, Florida home in January 2018 on multiple charges stemming from an Instagram live-feed video showing him passing marijuana and a gun around a small child. He initially faced seven felony charges including child neglect, grand theft of a firearm, possession of a firearm by a convicted felon, and marijuana possession. On February 22, 2018, three charges against Kodak Black were dropped and he pleaded not guilty to the remaining two. On April 17, he pleaded not guilty to the remaining charges, possession of a firearm by a convicted felon and possession of marijuana, and was sentenced to 364 days in prison with credit for time served. He was released on August 18, 2018.

While on tour in the Southeast, a South Carolinian Prosecutor announced that Kodak Black would be facing trial for first-degree criminal sexual conduct for the alleged rape in February 2016. The prosecutor said that in the summer or early fall, Kodak Black would have to return to South Carolina and face trial for the charges. They stated he faces a maximum of 30 years in prison. 12 Circuit Solicitor Ed Clements stated, "We are slowly but steadily moving toward a disposition." There were also reportedly several lesser, related charges. The office of the prosecutor stated the victim was not a minor at the time of the alleged rape.

As of April 5, 2019, a concert promoter filed a lawsuit against Kodak Black for failing to appear at his concerts. Nicholas Fitts—the promoter—claims that Kodak Black was contractually obliged to perform for him on March 3, 2017, in New York, but did not show up. Fitts then rescheduled it for April 2017, and Kodak Black failed to appear once more. Then on a third makeup date, Kodak Black once more failed to appear. Fitts stated that the incident caused him over $500,000 in losses and hurt his reputation. His lawsuit was suing for over $500,000.

While trying to re-enter the United States from Canada on April 17, 2019, Kodak Black was arrested by United States Customs and Border Protection after border authorities found marijuana and a Glock in his car. He was charged with third-degree criminal possession of a weapon, and unlawful possession of marijuana by authorities. Bail was set at either $40,000 or $20,000, he was released on the 18th. As a result of the arrest, a performance in Boston and a performance in Connecticut was canceled.

Late on April 24, 2019, while on tour for his most recent album at the time, Dying to Live, and while performing at a venue, officials from the Federal Bureau of Investigation and Metropolitan police entered and searched one of Kodak Black's tour buses parked at the venue. While Kodak Black was not in the vehicle at the time, the FBI found weapons in the vehicle and detained a few of Kodak Black's crew members. Allegedly, the FBI attempted to enter the club in which Kodak Black was performing, but was denied entry by the owner. TMZ stated it was "unclear" whether or not the bus was owned by Kodak Black. This came a week after his arrest at the United States–Canada border. It was stated Kodak Black himself did not get in trouble with law enforcement.

On May 11, 2019, while preparing to perform at Rolling Loud Miami, Kodak Black was arrested on firearm charges before he could perform. He was arrested by Miami PD and Federal Officers, and faced state and federal charges. This was nearly a month after he was arrested while entering the United States from Canada. Kodak Black was charged with two counts of making a false statement on a governmental form, this stemmed from January 2019, where he lied on the form while attempting to purchase firearms. He filed to use his $600,000 home as collateral for his $500,000 bond for the indictments and was granted the bond, being released. He reportedly faced up to 10 years in prison on the charges and pleaded not guilty on May 15. Federal prosecutors, however, attempted to revoke Kodak Black's bail, pointing to past violent crimes, such as a 2012 carjacking incident, and his possible connections to a shooting in March 2019. The arrest had the potential to cause his bond in the 2016 South Carolina rape case to be revoked. Federal prosecutors stated that he posed a danger to society due to his long history of criminal acts as well as his repeated violation of past probation rules. Kodak Black's lawyer stated that he voluntarily turned himself in upon hearing of a warrant and that he was not a danger to society due to the crime being non-violent. It was reported by TMZ on November 13, 2019, that Kodak Black had taken a plea bargain and had been sentenced to 46 months in prison, a drastically shorter sentence than the 96 months that the courts had been considering as the rapper had been involved in a fight while incarcerated that involved injury to a prison guard.

On March 11, 2020, Kodak Black pleaded guilty to a firearms possession case he was charged with after being detained at the Canadian-American border with a Glock. With the sentencing set for March 24, the court considered between 2 and 7 years in prison, which would run concurrently with his 46-month sentencing for lying on federal paperwork.

In June 2020, Kodak Black was serving his federal sentence at United States Penitentiary, Big Sandy, a high-security prison in Inez, Kentucky. In October 2020, Kodak Black was transferred to United States Penitentiary, Thomson.

On January 19, 2021, President Donald Trump commuted Kodak Black's sentence for his 2020 conviction. Kodak Black still faced charges of criminal sexual assault in Florence, South Carolina, which prosecutors were looking to "aggressively" pursue. On April 28, 2021, Kodak took a plea deal in the alleged sexual assault case and pleaded guilty to a lesser charge of first-degree assault and battery, and was sentenced to 18 months of probation.

Kodak failed a drug test in mid-2021, which was a violation of his supervised release terms. He was subsequently ordered by a judge to enter a rehabilitation center for 90 days. He completed the 90 days in December of that year.

On January 1, 2022, he was arrested for trespassing in Pompano Beach, Florida.

On July 15, 2022, Kodak Black's vehicle was stopped by Florida Highway Patrol because the window tint appeared darker than the legal limit. Police detected a smell of marijuana and searched the vehicle, finding a bag with 31 oxycodone tablets and almost $75,000 in cash. Kodak Black was charged with trafficking in oxycodone and possession of a controlled substance. His driver's license and vehicle tag were also expired. On July 20, 2022, Kodak was placed on house arrest after his arrest was said to be a violation of his supervised release.

On December 7, 2023, Kodak Black was arrested in Plantation, Florida for possession of cocaine and tampering with evidence. A police officer initially approached him after his vehicle was blocking a roadway. Black was found with 4.1 grams (0.14 oz) of cocaine after he tried to ingest the drug to avoid the officer discovering them. He bonded out of jail after the incident, but it was reported on December 16, 2023, that he was once again back in federal custody for violating probation. He was later released in February 2024. He was later reported to be embroiled in a custody battle with Miranda Johnson, the mother of two out of his five children, while also facing accusations of failure to pay child support and domestic abuse.

On May 6, 2026, Kodak Black was arrested in Orange County, Florida for drug trafficking of MDMA. The following day, he appeared in court on charges relating to the December 2023 incident and was released on $75,000 bond. According to an affidavit, the charges stemmed from a November 2025 incident in Orlando in which police searched his vehicle and found items that matched an Instagram post he made prior to the incident.

== Discography ==
- Painting Pictures (2017)
- Dying to Live (2018)
- Bill Israel (2020)
- Back for Everything (2022)
- Kutthroat Bill: Vol. 1 ( 2022)
- Pistolz & Pearlz (2023)
- When I Was Dead (2023)
- Just Getting Started (2025)
- Kodak the Blessing (2026)

== Tours ==
=== Headlining ===
- Dying to Live Tour (2019)
