= Travis Scott discography =

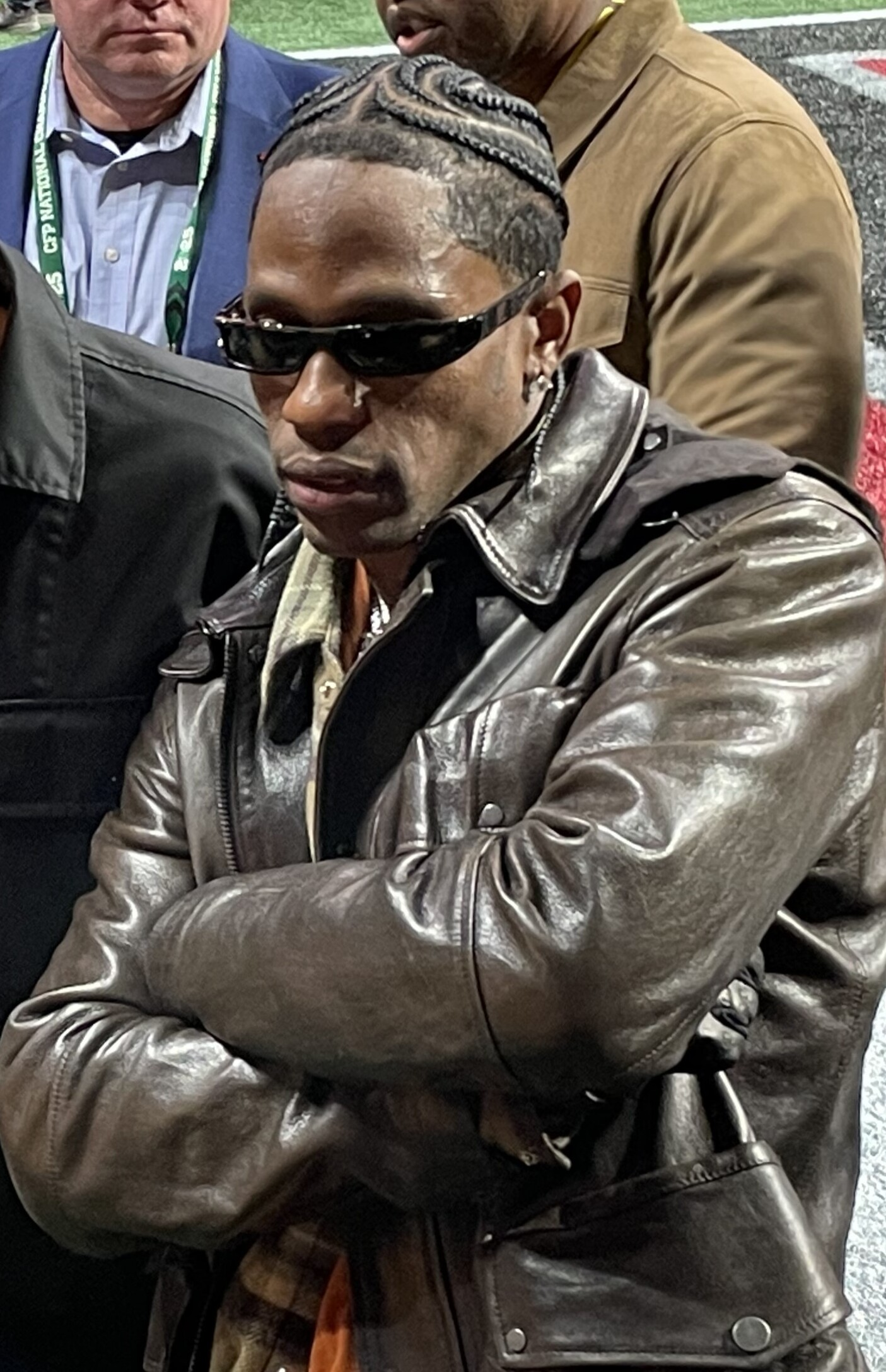
- Scott in 2025
- Studio albums: 4
- EPs: 2
- Compilation albums: 2
- Singles: 83
- Mixtapes: 5
- Promotional singles: 7
- Music videos: 43
- Collaborative albums: 1

The discography of Travis Scott, an American rapper and record producer, consists of four studio albums, two collaborative extended plays (EPs), two compilation albums, 83 singles (including 35 as a featured artist), five mixtapes, (including three collaborative mixtapes), seven promotional singles, 43 music videos, and one collaborative album. Following two mixtape releases—Owl Pharaoh and Days Before Rodeo (which has been re-released to streaming media as a celebration of its tenth anniversary on August 23, 2024, and reached the top spot of the Billboard 200)—between 2013 and 2014 respectively, his debut studio album, Rodeo (2015), reached at number 3 on the Billboard 200 and produced the top-20 single—"Antidote"—that has reached at number 16 on the Billboard Hot 100. His second studio album, Birds in the Trap Sing McKnight (2016), debuted atop the Billboard 200 and gave Scott his first chart-topping project, and also produced the top-40 single—"Goosebumps" (featuring Kendrick Lamar)—that has reached at number 32 on the Billboard Hot 100. His first collaborative album, Huncho Jack, Jack Huncho (2017; with Quavo), under the name Huncho Jack, which is a name after Quavo's nickname of "Huncho" and Scott's nickname of "Jack". In 2018, Scott released the single, "Watch" (featuring Lil Uzi Vert and Kanye West), which charted at number 16 on the Hot 100.

His third studio album, Astroworld (2018), debuted atop the Billboard 200 and giving Scott his second chart-topping project, and also produced the Billboard Hot 100 number-one single—"Sicko Mode"—that gave Scott his first number-one single and produced the top-40 single—"Yosemite"—that has reached at number 25 on the Hot 100. "Wake Up" was released as a single in 2019, becoming a top-40 single, and reached at number 30 on the Hot 100. The promotional single, "Stargazing", also reached number 8 on the Hot 100. Also in 2019, Ed Sheeran collaborated with Scott on a song, "Antisocial", which charted at number 37 on the Hot 100. Later that same year, he released the single, "Highest in the Room", which became his second number-one single. His first compilation album with his record label, Cactus Jack Records (named as JackBoys), JackBoys (2019), debuted atop the Billboard 200 and gave Scott his third chart-topping project, but was not credited for the song. The album produced the top-40 single, "Out West" (featuring Young Thug), which reached at number 38 on the Hot 100. In 2020, he collaborated with Kid Cudi on a song—"The Scotts" (under the name the Scotts)—which became his third number-one single and released the single—"Franchise" (featuring Young Thug and M.I.A.)—that became his fourth number-one single. In 2021, Scott collaborated with Lil Baby and Lil Durk on a song, "Hats Off" (debuted at number 16 on the Hot 100), and collaborated with Thug and Drake on "Bubbly", which debuted at number 20 on the Hot 100. Also that same year, he released the top-20 single—"Escape Plan"—and the top-40 single—"Mafia"—with both songs peaking at numbers 11 and 26 on the Hot 100, respectively. In 2022, two of Scott's collaborations with Metro Boomin peaked in the top 40 of the Hot 100, with "Niagara Falls (Foot or 2)" (also with 21 Savage) and "Raindrops (Insane)", charting at numbers 27 and 31, respectively. His fourth studio album, Utopia (2023), debuted atop the Billboard 200, giving Scott his fourth chart-topping project and his third with him being credited for that record. It produced two top-5 singles—"Meltdown" (featuring Drake) and "Fein" (featuring Playboi Carti)—with both songs peaked numbers 3 and 5 on the Billboard Hot 100, respectively, while also produced the top-10 single—"K-pop" (a collaboration with Bad Bunny and the Weeknd)—that debuted at number 7 on the Hot 100, produced the top-20 single—"I Know ?"—that debuted at number 11 on the Hot 100, and also produced the top-40 single—"Delresto (Echoes)" (with Beyoncé)—that debuted at number 25 on the Hot 100. In 2024, Scott collaborated with Savage and Metro on a song, "Née-Nah", which debuted at number 10 on the Hot 100. Later that same year, both of his collaborations with Future and Metro debuted in the top 10 of the Hot 100, with "Type Shit" (also with Carti) and "Cinderella", charting at numbers 2 and 6, respectively. In 2025, Scott released the single—"4x4"—that became his fifth number-one single and two of his collaborations with Carti debuted in the top 40 of the Hot 100, with "Crush" and "Philly" charting at numbers 20 and 28, respectively. His second compilation album with Cactus Jack (JackBoys), JackBoys 2 (2025), debuted atop the Billboard 200 and gave Scott his fifth chart-topping project.

Scott has been featured on several songs that have received mainstream success, starting with his 2017's appearance on SZA's single, "Love Galore", which reached number 32 on the Hot 100. Later that same year he appeared, alongside Quavo, on Drake's single, "Portland", which reached number 9 on the Hot 100. Scott then appeared on Savage, Offset, and Metro's song, "Ghostface Killers", which charted at number 35 on the Hot 100. Later that same year, he appeared on Miguel's single, "Sky Walker", which charted at number 29 on the Hot 100. In 2018, Scott appeared, alongside Offset, on Kodak Black's single, "Zeze", which reached number 2 on the Hot 100, serving as his highest-charting song as a featured artist. In 2019, he appeared, alongside J. Cole, on Thug's single, "The London", which reached number 12 on the Hot 100. Later that same year, Scott appeared, alongside Ozzy Osbourne, on Post Malone's single, "Take What You Want", which charted at number 8 on the Hot 100. In 2020, he appeared on Nav and Gunna's single, "Turks", which peaked at number 17 on the Hot 100. Later that same year, Scott appeared on Future's song, "Solitaires", which entered at number 32 on the Hot 100. In 2021, he appeared, alongside Baby Keem, on West's song, "Praise God", which peaked at number 20 on the Hot 100. Later that same year, Scott appeared on Drake's song, "Fair Trade", which peaked at number 3 on the Hot 100. In 2022, he appeared on Drake and Savage's song, "Pussy & Millions", which charted at number 6 on the Hot 100. In 2023, Scott appeared on Uzi's song, "Aye", which peaked at number 31 on the Hot 100. In 2024, he appeared, alongside Carti, on ¥$ (West and Ty Dolla Sign)'s song, "Fuk Sumn", which entered at number 23 on the Hot 100. In 2026, Scott was featured on label signee Don Toliver's song, "Rosary", which debuted at number 36 on the Hot 100.

== Albums ==
=== Studio albums ===
List of studio albums, with selected chart positions and sales figures
Title	Album details	Peak chart positions										First-week sales	Certifications
Title	Album details	US	US R&B /HH	US Rap	AUS	CAN	DEN	FRA	IRE	NZ	UK	First-week sales	Certifications
Rodeo	Released: September 4, 2015; Label: Grand Hustle, Epic; Formats: CD, LP, streaming, digital download	3	2	1	30	5	23	54	—	22	22	US: 110,000 (Note: United States sales figures for Rodeo as of November 2015.)	RIAA: 2× Platinum; BPI: Gold; IFPI DEN: Platinum; MC: Platinum; RMNZ: Platinum
Birds in the Trap Sing McKnight	Released: September 2, 2016; Label: Grand Hustle, Epic; Formats: CD, LP, streaming, digital download	1	1	1	10	2	17	37	—	10	19	US: 53,000 (Note: United States first-week sales figures for Birds in the Trap Sing McKnight as of September 2016.)	RIAA: 4× Platinum; BPI: Gold; IFPI DEN: 2× Platinum; MC: 2× Platinum; SNEP: Platinum; RMNZ: 3× Platinum
Astroworld	Released: August 3, 2018; Label: Cactus Jack, Grand Hustle, Epic; Formats: CD, LP, streaming, digital download	1	1	1	1	1	1	2	2	1	3	US: 648,200 (Note: During 2018, the album sold over 464,000 copies, plus 54,000 copies during 2019, 57,200 during 2020 and 73,000 pure copies in 2021)	RIAA: 6× Platinum; ARIA: 2× Platinum; BPI: Platinum; IFPI DEN: 4× Platinum; MC: 5× Platinum; RMNZ: 4× Platinum; SNEP: 2× Platinum
Utopia	Released: July 28, 2023; Labels: Cactus Jack, Epic; Formats: CD, LP, streaming, digital download	1	1	1	1	1	1	1	1	1	1	US: 575,000 (Note: In 2023, the album sold 575,000 copies); WW: 415,000 (Note: Worldwide sales for UTOPIA in 2023)	RIAA: 2× Platinum; ARIA: Gold; BPI: Platinum; IFPI DEN: Platinum; MC: 3× Platinum; RMNZ: Platinum; SNEP: Platinum
"—" denotes a title that did not chart, or was not released in that territory.

=== Collaborative albums ===
List of collaborative albums, with selected chart positions and sales figures
Title	Album details	Peak chart positions										First-week sales	Certifications
Title	Album details	US	US R&B /HH	US Rap	BEL (FL)	CAN	DEN	NLD	NZ	SWE	SWI	First-week sales	Certifications
Huncho Jack, Jack Huncho (with Quavo as Huncho Jack)	Released: December 21, 2017; Label: Grand Hustle, Epic, Cactus Jack, Quality Control, Capitol, Motown; Formats: CD, LP, digital download, streaming	3	1	1	54	6	9	15	22	17	41	US: 17,000 (Note: United States sales figures for Huncho Jack, Jack Huncho as of December 2017.)	BPI: Silver; IFPI DEN: Gold

=== Compilation albums ===
List of compilation albums, with selected chart positions and sales figures
Title	Album details	Peak chart positions										First-week sales	Certifications
Title	Album details	US	US R&B /HH	US Rap	BEL (FL)	CAN	DEN	GER	NZ	SWE	SWI	First-week sales	Certifications
JackBoys (with JackBoys)	Released: December 27, 2019; Label: Cactus Jack, Epic; Formats: CD, LP, cassette, digital download, streaming	1	1	1	19	1	6	22	5	10	6	US: 79,000	BPI: Gold; RMNZ: Gold
JackBoys 2 (with JackBoys)	Released: July 13, 2025; Label: Cactus Jack, Epic; Formats: CD, LP, digital download, streaming	1	1	1	9	4	—	9	5	27	2	US: 160,000	

== Mixtapes ==
List of mixtapes, with selected chart positions and sales figures
Title	Mixtape details	Peak chart positions										First-week sales
Title	Mixtape details	US	US R&B /HH	US Rap	AUS	CAN	DEN	FRA	IRE	NZ	UK	First-week sales
Owl Pharaoh	Released: May 21, 2013; Label: Grand Hustle; Formats: CD, LP, digital download	—	—	—	—	—	—	—	—	—	—	
Days Before Rodeo	Released: August 18, 2014 (Note: Re-released on streaming on August 23, 2024, through Cactus Jack and Epic.); Re-Released: August 23, 2024; Label: Grand Hustle; Formats: CD, LP, digital download, streaming	1	1	1	9	9	19	16	23	12	15	US (Re-release): 481,000 (Note: As of September 2024, the album has sold 481,000 pure copies)
"—" denotes a title that did not chart, or was not released in that territory.

=== Collaborative mixtapes ===
List of collaborative mixtapes, with selected details
Title	Mixtape details
B.A.P.E Mixtape (with The Classmates)	Released: 2009; Label: Self-released; Formats: Digital download
Buddy Rich (with The Classmates)	Released: 2009; Label: Self-released; Formats: Digital download
Cruis'n USA (with The Classmates)	Released: 2011; Label: Self-released; Formats: Digital download

== Extended plays ==
=== Collaborative extended plays ===
List of collaborative extended plays, with selected details
Title	EP details
The Graduates EP (with The Graduates)	Released: 2008; Label: Self-released; Formats: Digital download
The Classmates (with The Classmates)	Released: 2011; Label: Self-released; Formats: Digital download

== Singles ==
=== As lead artist ===
List of singles as lead artist, with selected chart positions, showing year released and album name
Title	Year	Peak chart positions										Certifications	Album
Title	Year	US	US R&B /HH	US Rap	AUS	CAN	FRA	IRE	NZ	SWE	UK	Certifications	Album
"Freestyle In Joc Studio"	2008	—	—	—	—	—	—	—	—	—	—		The Graduates EP
"Upper Echelon" (featuring T.I. and 2 Chainz)	2013	—	—	—	—	—	—	—	—	—	—	RIAA: Gold	Owl Pharaoh
"Don't Play" (featuring the 1975 and Big Sean)	2014	—	38	—	—	—	—	—	—	—	—	RIAA: Gold; MC: Gold	Days Before Rodeo
"Mamacita" (featuring Rich Homie Quan and Young Thug)	2014	— (Note: "Mamacita" did not enter the Billboard Hot 100, but peaked at number nine on the Bubbling Under Hot 100 Singles chart.)	26	22	—	—	—	—	— (Note: "Mamacita" did not enter the NZ Top 40 Singles Chart, but peaked at number 15 on the NZ Hot Singles Chart.)	—	—	RIAA: Platinum; MC: Platinum	Days Before Rodeo
"3500" (featuring Future and 2 Chainz)	2015	82	25	18	—	—	—	—	—	—	—	RIAA: Platinum; RMNZ: Gold	Rodeo
"Antidote"	2015	16	7	4	—	38	120	—	—	—	—	RIAA: 7× Platinum; ARIA: Gold; MC: 2× Platinum; RMNZ: 2× Platinum; BPI: Gold	Rodeo
"Whole Lotta Lovin'" (with Mustard)	2016	— (Note: "Whole Lotta Lovin'" did not enter the Billboard Hot 100, but peaked at number 18 on the Bubbling Under Hot 100 Singles chart.)	38	—	—	—	—	—	—	—	—	RIAA: Gold	Non-album singles
"A-Team"	2016	—	—	—	—	—	—	—	—	—	—	RIAA: Platinum	Non-album singles
"Wonderful" (featuring the Weeknd)	2016	—	—	—	—	—	—	—	—	—	—	RIAA: 2× Platinum; ARIA: Gold; MC: Platinum; RMNZ: Gold	Birds in the Trap Sing McKnight
"Pick Up the Phone" (with Young Thug featuring Quavo)	2016	43	12	3	—	62	95	—	— (Note: "Pick Up the Phone" did not enter the NZ Top 40 Singles Chart, but peaked at number seven on the NZ Heatseeker Singles Chart.)	—	181	RIAA: 5× Platinum; MC: 3× Platinum; SNEP: Gold; RMNZ: 3× Platinum; BPI: Gold	Birds in the Trap Sing McKnight
"Champions" (with Kanye West, Gucci Mane, Big Sean, 2 Chainz, Yo Gotti, Quavo, and Desiigner)	2016	71	22	15	—	73	—	—	—	—	128	RIAA: Platinum; BPI: Silver	Non-album single
"Goosebumps" (featuring Kendrick Lamar)	2016	32	21	13	45	56	23	65	—	46	65	RIAA: 17× Platinum; ARIA: 5× Platinum; BPI: 3× Platinum; GLF: Gold; MC: 6× Platinum; SNEP: Platinum; RMNZ: 8× Platinum	Birds in the Trap Sing McKnight
"Beibs in the Trap" (featuring Nav)	2016	90	38	—	—	52	—	—	—	—	—	RIAA: 4× Platinum; ARIA: Platinum; BPI: Silver; MC: 2× Platinum; RMNZ: Platinum	Birds in the Trap Sing McKnight
"Go Off" (with Lil Uzi Vert and Quavo)	2017	— (Note: "Go Off" did not enter the Billboard Hot 100, but peaked at number seven on the Bubbling Under Hot 100 Singles chart.)	39	—	—	—	124	—	—	—	—	RIAA: Platinum	The Fate of the Furious: The Album
"Butterfly Effect"	2017	50	17	12	46	40	117	90	—	98	57	RIAA: 9× Platinum; ARIA: 3× Platinum; BPI: 2× Platinum; MC: 8× Platinum; RMNZ: 4× Platinum; GLF: Gold; SNEP: Gold	Astroworld
"Watch" (featuring Lil Uzi Vert and Kanye West)	2018	16	9	8	65	24	—	—	— (Note: "Watch" did not enter the NZ Top 40 Singles Chart, but peaked at number two on the NZ Heatseeker Singles Chart.)	—	53	RIAA: Platinum; RMNZ: Gold	Non-album single
"Sicko Mode" (featuring Drake)	2018	1	1	1	6	3	20	11	7	29	9	RIAA: 16× Platinum; ARIA: 9× Platinum; BPI: 3× Platinum; GLF: Gold; MC: 7× Platinum; RMNZ: 7× Platinum; SNEP: Platinum	Astroworld
"Yosemite"	2018	25	16	14	97	18	93	—	—	92	93	RIAA: 4× Platinum; ARIA: Platinum; BPI: Gold; MC: 4× Platinum; SNEP: Gold; RMNZ: Platinum	Astroworld
"Wake Up"	2019	30	21	—	67	27	96	—	28	93	— (Note: "Wake Up" did not enter the UK Singles Chart, as chart rules only allow three songs per artist to chart within the top one hundred at a time, but peaked at number 64 on the UK Streaming Chart.)	RIAA: 2× Platinum; ARIA: Platinum; BPI: Silver; MC: 2× Platinum; RMNZ: Platinum	Astroworld
"Chopstix" (with Schoolboy Q)	2019	85	32	—	—	69	—	—	— (Note: "Chopstix" did not enter the NZ Top 40 Singles Chart, but peaked at number seven on the NZ Hot Singles Chart.)	—	—	RIAA: Gold	Crash Talk
"Power Is Power" (with SZA and the Weeknd)	2019	90	36	—	30	50	—	31	— (Note: "Power Is Power" did not enter the NZ Top 40 Singles Chart, but peaked at number three on the NZ Hot Singles Chart.)	41	45	RIAA: Gold	For the Throne: Music Inspired by the HBO Series Game of Thrones
"Antisocial" (with Ed Sheeran)	2019	37	—	—	11	17	102	—	9	21	—	RIAA: Gold; ARIA: Gold; BPI: Gold; MC: Platinum; RMNZ: Platinum	No.6 Collaborations Project
"Highest in the Room"	2019	1	1	1	3	1	11	3	2	6	2	RIAA: 9× Platinum; ARIA: 3× Platinum; BPI: 2× Platinum; GLF: Platinum; MC: 5× Platinum; RMNZ: 5× Platinum; SNEP: Platinum	Non-album single
"Out West" (with JackBoys featuring Young Thug)	2020	38	15	12	79	29	117	69	— (Note: "Out West" did not enter the NZ Top 40 Singles Chart, but peaked at number three on the NZ Hot Singles Chart.)	—	—	RIAA: 4× Platinum; BPI: Silver; MC: Platinum; RMNZ: Platinum	JackBoys
"The Scotts" (with Kid Cudi as the Scotts)	2020	1	1	1	4	1	2	2	2	8	11	RIAA: 3× Platinum; ARIA: Gold; BPI: Silver; MC: 2× Platinum; RMNZ: Platinum	Non-album singles
"TKN" (with Rosalía)	2020	66	—	—	—	57	52	43	— (Note: "TKN" did not enter the NZ Top 40 Singles Chart, but peaked at number eight on the NZ Hot Singles Chart.)	86	41	RIAA: Gold; ARIA: Gold; BPI: Silver; MC: Gold	Non-album singles
"The Plan"	2020	74	28	—	—	62	—	—	— (Note: "The Plan" did not enter the NZ Top 40 Singles Chart, but peaked at number seven on the NZ Hot Singles Chart.)	— (Note: "The Plan" did not enter the Swedish Singles Chart, but peaked at number three on the Swedish Heatseeker chart.)	93		Tenet: Original Motion Picture Soundtrack
"Franchise" (featuring Young Thug and M.I.A.)	2020	1	1	1	31	16	120	23	37	57	26	RIAA: 2× Platinum; BPI: Silver; MC: Gold; RMNZ: Gold	Non-album singles
"Goosebumps" (Remix) (with Hvme)	2021	47	—	—	5	10	10	4	22	—	8	ARIA: 2× Platinum; BPI: Platinum; MC: 2× Platinum	Non-album singles
"Durag Activity" (with Baby Keem)	2021	85	38	—	—	53	—	—	— (Note: "Durag Activity" did not enter the NZ Top 40 Singles Chart, but peaked at number six on the NZ Hot Singles Chart.)	—	96	RIAA: Gold	The Melodic Blue
"Bubbly" (with Young Thug and Drake)	2021	20	7	5	88	22	—	64	— (Note: "Bubbly" did not enter the NZ Top 40 Singles Chart, but peaked at number five on the NZ Hot Singles Chart.)	—	60		Punk
"Escape Plan"	2021	11	3	2	22	9	87	24	25	67	23	RIAA: Platinum	Non-album singles
"Mafia"	2021	26	10	5	47	16	94	40	— (Note: "Mafia" did not enter the NZ Top 40 Singles Chart, but peaked at number four on the NZ Hot Singles Chart.)	— (Note: "Mafia" did not enter the Swedish Singellista Chart, but peaked at number six on the Sweden Heatseeker Chart.)	41	RIAA: Gold	Non-album singles
"Down in Atlanta" (with Pharrell Williams)	2022	88	28	22	68	56	186	61	— (Note: "Down in Atlanta" did not enter the NZ Top 40 Singles Chart, but peaked at number one on the NZ Hot Singles Chart.)	63	81		Non-album singles
"Krzy Train" (with Trippie Redd)	2023	90	35	18	—	—	—	—	— (Note: "Krzy Train" did not enter the NZ Top 40 Singles Chart, but peaked at number 19 on the NZ Hot Singles Chart.)	—	—		Mansion Musik
"K-pop" (with Bad Bunny and the Weeknd)	2023	7	2	2	22	14	20	30	27	26	24	RIAA: Platinum; MC: Platinum	Utopia
"Delresto (Echoes)" (with Beyoncé)	2023	25	14	—	34	26	38	—	30	— (Note: "Delresto (Echoes)" did not enter the Swedish Singellista Chart, but peaked at number one on the Swedish Heatseeker Chart.)	— (Note: "Delresto (Echoes)" did not enter the UK Singles Chart, as chart rules only allow three songs per artist to chart within the top one hundred at a time, but peaked at number 45 on the UK Streaming Chart.)	MC: Gold	Utopia
"Meltdown" (featuring Drake)	2023	3	1	1	8	1	21	10	4	45	10	RIAA: 2× Platinum; BPI: Silver; MC: 2× Platinum; RMNZ: Gold	Utopia
"I Know ?"	2023	11	5	5	20	11	34	83	10	98	62	RIAA: 3× Platinum; BPI: Silver; MC: 4× Platinum; RMNZ: Platinum; SNEP: Gold	Utopia
"Water" (Remix) (with Tyla)	2023	—	—	—	—	—	—	—	— (Note: "Water" did not enter the NZ Top 40 Singles Chart, but peaked at number six on the NZ Hot Singles Chart.)	75	—		Tyla
"Née-Nah" (with 21 Savage and Metro Boomin)	2024	10	5	4	34	8	108	27	23	81	23	RIAA: Platinum; MC: Platinum; RMNZ: Gold	American Dream
"Fein" (featuring Playboi Carti)	2024	5	2	2	11	6	11	14	6	52	13	RIAA: 4× Platinum; ARIA: 2× Platinum; BPI: Gold; MC: 4× Platinum; RMNZ: 2× Platinum; SNEP: Platinum	Utopia
"Type Shit" (with Future, Metro Boomin, and Playboi Carti)	2024	2	2	2	29	8	91	26	23	91	18	ARIA: Gold; BPI: Gold; MC: 2× Platinum; RMNZ: Platinum	We Don't Trust You
"Parking Lot" (with Mustard)	2024	57	17	15	—	49	—	—	— (Note: "Parking Lot" did not enter the NZ Top 40 Singles Chart, but peaked at number five on the NZ Hot Singles Chart.)	—	83	RIAA: Gold; RMNZ: Gold	Faith of a Mustard Seed
"Oh Shhh..." (with Ice Spice)	2024	— (Note: "Oh Shhh..." did not enter the Billboard Hot 100, but peaked at number 19 on the Bubbling Under Hot 100 Singles chart.)	36	—	—	—	—	—	— (Note: "Oh Shhh..." did not enter the NZ Top 40 Singles Chart, but peaked at number 15 on the NZ Hot Singles Chart.)	—	—		Y2K!
"Active" (with Asake)	2024	—	—	—	—	95	—	88	— (Note: "Active" did not enter the NZ Top 40 Singles Chart, but peaked at number 13 on the NZ Hot Singles Chart.)	—	58		Lungu Boy
"Drugs You Should Try It"	2024	66	13	12	—	63	—	—	— (Note: "Drugs You Should Try It" did not enter the NZ Top 40 Singles Chart, but peaked at number six on the NZ Hot Singles Chart.)	—	84		Days Before Rodeo
"South of France" (Remix) (with Future)	2024	57	—	—	—	93	—	—	— (Note: "South of France" (Remix) did not enter the NZ Top 40 Singles Chart, but peaked at number six on the NZ Hot Singles Chart.)	—	—		Mixtape Pluto
"4x4"	2025	1	1	1	53	24	75	47	30	97	23	RIAA: Gold	Non-album single
"ILMB" (with Sheck Wes)	2025	—	—	—	—	—	—	—	— (Note: "ILMB" did not enter the NZ Top 40 Singles Chart, but peaked at number 29 on the NZ Hot Singles Chart.)	—	—		JackBoys 2
"2000 Excursion" (with Sheck Wes and Don Toliver)	2025	72	24	12	—	78	—	—	— (Note: "2000 Excursion" did not enter the NZ Top 40 Singles Chart, but peaked at number nine on the NZ Hot Singles Chart.)	—	—		JackBoys 2
"Dumbo"	2025	54	14	8	—	61	—	—	— (Note: "Dumbo" did not enter the NZ Top 40 Singles Chart, but peaked at number eight on the NZ Hot Singles Chart.)	—	74		JackBoys 2
"PBT" (with Tyla and Vybz Kartel)	2025	—	—	—	—	—	—	—	—	—	—		JackBoys 2
"Shyne" (with GloRilla)	2025	93	31	17	—	92	—	—	—	—	—		JackBoys 2
"—" denotes a title that did not chart, or was not released in that territory.

=== As featured artist ===
List of singles as featured artist, with selected chart positions, showing year released and album name
Title	Year	Peak chart positions										Certifications	Album
Title	Year	US	US R&B /HH	US Rap	AUS	CAN	FRA	IRE	NZ	SWE	UK	Certifications	Album
"XX" (Lex Luger featuring Travis Scott)	2012	—	—	—	—	—	—	—	—	—	—		Non-album single
"Bake Sale" (Wiz Khalifa featuring Travis Scott)	2016	56	18	9	—	70	71	—	—	—	—	RIAA: Gold	Khalifa
"No English" (Juicy J featuring Travis Scott)	2016	—	—	—	—	—	—	—	—	—	—		Rubba Band Business
"Last Time" (Gucci Mane featuring Travis Scott)	2016	—	— (Note: "Last Time" did not enter the Hot R&B/Hip-Hop Songs chart, but peaked at number 48 on the Hot R&B/Hip-Hop Airplay chart.)	—	—	—	—	—	—	—	—	RIAA: Gold	The Return of East Atlanta Santa
"Love Galore" (SZA featuring Travis Scott)	2017	32	12	—	—	84	—	—	—	—	—	RIAA: 8× Platinum; BPI: Gold; MC: 4× Platinum; RMNZ: 5× Platinum	Ctrl
"Portland" (Drake featuring Quavo and Travis Scott)	2017	9	6	3	—	6	118	38	38	73	27	RIAA: 2× Platinum; ARIA: 2× Platinum; RMNZ: Platinum; BPI: Platinum	More Life
"Know No Better" (Major Lazer featuring Travis Scott, Camila Cabello, and Quavo)	2017	87	36	—	34	30	18	19	28	30	15	RIAA: Gold; ARIA: 2× Platinum; BPI: Platinum; RMNZ: 2× Platinum; SNEP: Platinum	Know No Better
"Sky Walker" (Miguel featuring Travis Scott)	2017	29	14	—	—	87	—	—	— (Note: "Sky Walker" did not enter the NZ Top 40 Singles Chart, but peaked at number five on the NZ Heatseeker Singles Chart.)	—	—	RIAA: 3× Platinum; RMNZ: 4× Platinum; BPI: Silver	War & Leisure
"4 AM" (2 Chainz featuring Travis Scott)	2017	55	24	17	—	50	—	—	—	—	—	RIAA: 2× Platinum; RMNZ: Gold	Pretty Girls Like Trap Music
"Deserve" (Kris Wu featuring Travis Scott)	2017	— (Note: "Deserve" did not enter the Billboard Hot 100, but peaked at number four on the Bubbling Under Hot 100 Singles chart.)	44	—	—	—	—	—	—	—	—		Antares
"Blue Pill" (Metro Boomin featuring Travis Scott)	2017	—	—	—	—	—	—	—	—	—	—		Non-album single
"Dark Knight Dummo" (Trippie Redd featuring Travis Scott)	2017	72	29	—	—	93	—	—	— (Note: "Dark Knight Dummo" did not enter the NZ Top 40 Singles Chart, but peaked at number nine on the NZ Heatseeker Singles Chart.)	—	—	RIAA: 2× Platinum; BPI: Silver; MC: Gold; RMNZ: Platinum	Life's a Trip
"Krippy Kush" (Travis Scott Remix) (Farruko, Nicki Minaj, and Bad Bunny featuring Travis Scott and Rvssian)	2017	—	—	—	—	—	—	—	—	—	—		Non-album single
"Close" (Rae Sremmurd, Swae Lee, and Slim Jxmmi featuring Travis Scott)	2018	98	48	—	—	71	—	—	— (Note: "Close" did not enter the NZ Top 40 Singles Chart, but peaked at number eight on the NZ Heatseeker Singles Chart.)	—	—	RIAA: Gold	SR3MM
"Champion" (Nav featuring Travis Scott)	2018	86	43	—	—	47	—	—	—	—	—	RIAA: 2× Platinum; BPI: Silver; MC: 2× Platinum; RMNZ: Gold	Reckless
"Dangerous World" (Mustard featuring Travis Scott and YG)	2018	—	—	—	—	—	—	—	—	—	—		Non-album singles
"Neighbor" (Juicy J featuring Travis Scott)	2018	—	—	—	—	—	—	—	— (Note: "Neighbor" did not enter the NZ Top 40 Singles Chart, but peaked at number 21 on the NZ Heatseeker Singles Chart.)	—	—		Non-album singles
"Zeze" (Kodak Black featuring Travis Scott and Offset)	2018	2	1	1	14	1	77	11	7	7	7	RIAA: 6× Platinum; ARIA: Platinum; BPI: Platinum; SNEP: Gold; RMNZ: 3× Platinum	Dying to Live
"Mile High" (James Blake featuring Travis Scott and Metro Boomin)	2019	— (Note: "Mile High" did not enter the Billboard Hot 100, but peaked at number 22 on the Bubbling Under Hot 100 Singles chart.)	—	—	—	—	—	—	— (Note: "Mile High" did not enter the NZ Top 40 Singles Chart, but peaked at number nine on the NZ Hot Singles Chart.)	— (Note: "Mile High" did not enter the Swedish Singellista Chart, but peaked at number six on the Sweden Heatseeker Chart.)	47	RMNZ: Gold	Assume Form
"First Off" (Future featuring Travis Scott)	2019	47	24	20	—	39	—	—	— (Note: "First Off" did not enter the NZ Top 40 Singles Chart, but peaked at number 14 on the NZ Hot Singles Chart.)	—	78	RIAA: Platinum; MC: Gold	The Wizrd
"The London" (Young Thug featuring J. Cole and Travis Scott)	2019	12	6	5	17	6	103	19	8	40	18	RIAA: 3× Platinum; ARIA: Platinum; BPI: Gold; MC: 2× Platinum; RMNZ: 2× Platinum	So Much Fun
"Take What You Want" (Post Malone featuring Ozzy Osbourne and Travis Scott)	2019	8	—	—	30	8	154	37	30	24	22	RIAA: 2× Platinum; ARIA: 2× Platinum; BPI: Gold; MC: 5× Platinum; RMNZ: Platinum	Hollywood's Bleeding
"Hot" (Remix) (Young Thug featuring Gunna and Travis Scott)	2019	—	—	—	—	—	—	—	— (Note: "Hot" (Remix) did not enter the NZ Top 40 Singles Chart, but peaked at number five on the NZ Hot Singles Chart.)	93	—		So Much Fun (Deluxe)
"Give No Fxk" (Migos featuring Travis Scott and Young Thug)	2020	48	19	13	—	60	164	78	— (Note: "Give No Fxk" did not enter the NZ Top 40 Singles Chart, but peaked at number 13 on the NZ Hot Singles Chart.)	— (Note: "Give No Fxk" did not enter the Swedish Singellista Chart, but peaked at number 19 on the Sweden Heatseeker Chart.)	96		Non-album single
"Turks" (Nav and Gunna featuring Travis Scott)	2020	17	9	5	—	45	—	60	— (Note: "Turks" did not enter the NZ Top 40 Singles Chart, but peaked at number five on the NZ Hot Singles Chart.)	— (Note: "Turks" did not enter the Swedish Singellista Chart, but peaked at number 18 on the Sweden Heatseeker Chart.)	54	RIAA: 2× Platinum; MC: Platinum; RMNZ: Gold	Good Intentions
"Wash Us in the Blood" (Kanye West featuring Travis Scott)	2020	49	20	17	31	77	—	32	— (Note: "Wash Us in the Blood" did not enter the NZ Top 40 Singles Chart, but peaked at number four on the NZ Hot Singles Chart.)	— (Note: "Wash Us in the Blood" did not enter the Swedish Singellista Chart, but peaked at number 20 on the Sweden Heatseeker Chart.)	51		Non-album singles
"Buss It" (Remix) (Erica Banks featuring Travis Scott)	2021	—	—	—	—	—	—	—	— (Note: "Buss It" (Remix) did not enter the NZ Top 40 Singles Chart, but peaked at number 23on the NZ Hot Singles Chart.)	—	—		Non-album singles
"Flocky Flocky" (Don Toliver featuring Travis Scott)	2021	53	15	11	—	44	174	99	— (Note: "Flocky Flocky" did not enter the NZ Top 40 Singles Chart, but peaked at number five on the NZ Hot Singles Chart.)	—	46	RIAA: Gold; MC: Gold	Life of a Don
"Hold That Heat" (Southside and Future featuring Travis Scott)	2022	57	16	13	—	43	—	—	— (Note: "Hold That Heat" did not enter the NZ Top 40 Singles Chart, but peaked at number nine on the NZ Hot Singles Chart.)	—	—		Non-album single
"Never Sleep" (Nav and Lil Baby featuring Travis Scott)	2022	50	19	8	—	23	—	—	— (Note: "Never Sleep" did not enter the NZ Top 40 Singles Chart, but peaked at number seven on the NZ Hot Singles Chart.)	—	95	MC: Gold	Demons Protected by Angels
"Ring Ring" (Chase B featuring Travis Scott, Don Toliver, Quavo, and Ty Dolla Sign)	2023	—	—	—	—	—	—	—	— (Note: "Ring Ring" did not enter the NZ Top 40 Singles Chart, but peaked at number 11 on the NZ Hot Singles Chart.)	—	—		Non-album single
"Say My Grace" (Offset featuring Travis Scott)	2023	48	13	8	—	30	—	—	— (Note: "Say My Grace" did not enter the NZ Top 40 Singles Chart, but peaked at number three on the NZ Hot Singles Chart.)	—	49	RIAA: Gold	Set It Off
"Likka Sto 2" (Lil Blessin and G Herbo featuring Travis Scott and Bia)	2023	—	—	—	—	—	—	—	—	—	—		Non-album single
"At the Party" (Kid Cudi featuring Pharrell Williams and Travis Scott)	2023	—	47	—	—	—	—	—	— (Note: "At the Party" did not enter the NZ Top 40 Singles Chart, but peaked at number 16 on the NZ Hot Singles Chart.)	—	—		Insano
"FTCU" (SleezeMix) (Nicki Minaj featuring Travis Scott, Chris Brown, and Sexyy Red)	2024	—	—	—	—	—	—	—	— (Note: "FTCU" (SleezeMix) did not enter the NZ Top 40 Singles Chart, but peaked at number 20 on the NZ Hot Singles Chart.)	—	—		Non-album single
"TaTaTa" (Burna Boy featuring Travis Scott)	2025	—	—	—	—	—	—	—	— (Note: "TaTaTa" did not enter the NZ Top 40 Singles Chart, but peaked at number five on the NZ Hot Singles Chart.)	—	84		No Sign of Weakness
"Oh Chet" (Jey One featuring Travis Scott)	2026	—	—	—	—	—	—	—	—	—	—		Non-album singles
"Ya Hit" (Future featuring Drake, Travis Scott, and Loe Shimmy)	2026	38	5	3	—	23	—	—	—	—	—		Infinity
"—" denotes a title that did not chart, or was not released in that territory.

=== Promotional singles ===
List of promotional singles, with selected chart positions, showing year released and album name
Title	Year	Peak chart positions										Certifications	Album
Title	Year	US	US R&B /HH	US Rap	AUS	CAN	FRA	IRE	NZ	SWE	UK	Certifications	Album
"10 2 10" (Remix) (Big Sean featuring Rick Ross and Travis Scott)	2014	—	—	—	—	—	—	—	—	—	—		Non-album singles
"Chimes" (RMX) (Hudson Mohawke featuring Pusha T, Future, Travis Scott, and French Montana)	2014	—	—	—	—	—	—	—	—	—	—		Non-album singles
"Night Riders" (Major Lazer featuring Travis Scott, 2 Chainz, Pusha T, and Mad Cobra)	2015	—	—	—	—	—	—	—	—	—	—		Peace Is the Mission
"3 Wayz" (Ty Dolla Sign featuring Travis Scott)	2016	—	—	—	—	—	—	—	—	—	—		Campaign
"Baptized in Fire" (Kid Cudi featuring Travis Scott)	2016	— (Note: "Baptized in Fire" did not enter the US Billboard Hot 100, but peaked at number three on the Bubbling Under Hot 100 Singles chart.)	47	—	—	—	—	—	—	—	—		Passion, Pain & Demon Slayin'
"Love Hurts" (Playboi Carti featuring Travis Scott)	2018	— (Note: "Love Hurts" did not enter the US Billboard Hot 100, but peaked at number fifteen on the Bubbling Under Hot 100 Singles chart.)	— (Note: "Love Hurts" did not enter the Hot R&B/Hip-Hop Songs chart, but peaked at number eight on the Bubbling Under R&B/Hip-Hop Singles chart.)	—	—	—	—	—	—	—	—		Die Lit
"Stargazing"	2018	8	7	7	10	7	36	12	9	19	15	RIAA: 4× Platinum; ARIA: Platinum; BPI: Gold; MC: 4× Platinum; RMNZ: 2× Platinum	Astroworld
"Backr00ms" (with Playboi Carti)	2024	—	—	—	—	—	—	—	— (Note: "Backr00ms" did not enter the NZ Top 40 Singles Chart, but peaked at number 23 on the NZ Hot Singles Chart.)	—	—		Music – Sorry 4 da Wait
"Kick Out"	2025	50	12	6	82	58	—	—	— (Note: "Kick Out" did not enter the NZ Top 40 Singles Chart, but peaked at number six on the NZ Hot Singles Chart.)	—	66		JackBoys 2
"Rhyno"	2026	84	19	11	—	61	—	—	— (Note: "Rhyno" did not enter the NZ Top 40 Singles Chart, but peaked at number 5 on the NZ Hot Singles Chart.)	—	—		Grand Theft Auto VI: The Album
"—" denotes a title that did not chart, or was not released in that territory.

== Other charted and certified songs ==
List of other charted and certified songs, with selected chart positions, showing year of release and album name
Title	Year	Peak chart positions										Certifications	Album
Title	Year	US	US R&B /HH	US Rap	AUS	CAN	FRA	IRE	NZ	SWE	UK	Certifications	Album
"Days Before Rodeo: The Prayer"	2014	— (Note: "Days Before Rodeo: The Prayer" did not enter the Billboard Hot 100, but peaked at number 21 on the Bubbling Under Hot 100 Singles chart.)	36	—	—	—	—	—	— (Note: "Days Before Rodeo: The Prayer" did not enter the NZ Top 40 Singles Chart, but peaked at number 13 on the NZ Hot Singles Chart.)	—	—		Days Before Rodeo
"Quintana Pt. 2"	2014	—	39	—	—	—	—	—	— (Note: "Quintana Pt. 2" did not enter the NZ Top 40 Singles Chart, but peaked at number 16 on the NZ Hot Singles Chart.)	—	—		Days Before Rodeo
"Skyfall" (featuring Young Thug)	2014	— (Note: "Skyfall" did not enter the Billboard Hot 100, but peaked at number 12 on the Bubbling Under Hot 100 Singles chart.)	28	24	—	—	—	—	—	—	—		Days Before Rodeo
"Backyard"	2014	—	46	—	—	—	—	—	—	—	—		Days Before Rodeo
"Company" (Drake featuring Travis Scott)	2015	— (Note: "Company" did not enter the Billboard Hot 100, but peaked at number six on the Bubbling Under Hot 100 Singles chart.)	42	—	—	—	—	—	—	—	182		If You're Reading This It's Too Late
"Pornography"	2015	—	—	—	—	—	—	—	—	—	—	RIAA: Gold	Rodeo
"Oh My Dis Side" (featuring Quavo)	2015	—	— (Note: "Oh My Dis Side" did not enter the US Hot R&B/Hip-Hop Songs chart, but peaked at number nine on the Bubbling Under R&B/Hip-Hop Singles chart.)	—	—	—	—	—	—	—	—	RIAA: Platinum	Rodeo
"90210" (featuring Kacy Hill)	2015	—	—	—	—	—	—	—	—	—	—	RIAA: 4× Platinum; BPI: Gold; RMNZ: 2× Platinum	Rodeo
"Pray 4 Love" (featuring the Weeknd)	2015	—	— (Note: "Pray 4 Love" did not enter the Hot R&B/Hip-Hop Songs chart, but peaked at number one on the Bubbling Under R&B/Hip-Hop Singles chart.)	—	—	—	—	—	—	—	—	RIAA: Gold	Rodeo
"Nightcrawler" (featuring Swae Lee and Chief Keef)	2015	— (Note: "Nightcrawler" did not enter the Billboard Hot 100, but peaked at number 12 on the Bubbling Under Hot 100 Singles chart.)	45	—	—	68	—	—	—	—	—	RIAA: 2× Platinum; RMNZ: Gold; BPI: Silver	Rodeo
"Impossible"	2015	—	—	—	—	—	—	—	—	—	—	RIAA: Gold	Rodeo
"Maria I'm Drunk" (featuring Justin Bieber and Young Thug)	2015	—	—	—	—	—	—	—	—	—	—	RIAA: Platinum; RMNZ: Gold	Rodeo
"Apple Pie"	2015	—	—	—	—	—	—	—	—	—	—	RIAA: Platinum	Rodeo
"No Sense" (Justin Bieber featuring Travis Scott)	2015	54	—	—	—	42	198	59	36	63	50	RIAA: Platinum; RMNZ: Gold; BPI: Silver	Purpose
"Floyd Mayweather" (Young Thug featuring Travis Scott, Gucci Mane, and Gunna)	2016	— (Note: "Floyd Mayweather" did not enter the Billboard Hot 100, but peaked at number four on the Bubbling Under Hot 100 Singles chart.)	41	—	—	—	—	—	—	—	—		Jeffery
"The Ends" (featuring André 3000)	2016	—	— (Note: "The Ends" did not enter the Hot R&B/Hip-Hop Songs chart, but peaked at number two on the Bubbling Under R&B/Hip-Hop Singles chart.)	—	—	—	—	—	—	—	—	RIAA: Platinum	Birds in the Trap Sing McKnight
"Way Back"	2016	— (Note: "Way Back" did not enter the Billboard Hot 100, but peaked at number 19 on the Bubbling Under Hot 100 Singles chart.)	50	—	—	—	—	—	—	—	—	RIAA: Platinum; MC: Gold	Birds in the Trap Sing McKnight
"Coordinate" (featuring Blac Youngsta)	2016	—	— (Note: "Coordinate" did not enter the Hot R&B/Hip-Hop Songs chart, but peaked at number three on the Bubbling Under R&B/Hip-Hop Singles chart.)	—	—	—	—	—	—	—	—	RIAA: Platinum; MC: Gold	Birds in the Trap Sing McKnight
"Through the Late Night" (featuring Kid Cudi)	2016	— (Note: "Through the Late Night" did not enter the Billboard Hot 100, but peaked at number seven on the Bubbling Under Hot 100 Singles chart.)	43	—	—	—	—	—	—	—	—	RIAA: 2× Platinum; ARIA: Gold; MC: Platinum; RMNZ: Gold	Birds in the Trap Sing McKnight
"SDP Interlude"	2016	—	—	—	—	—	—	—	—	—	—	RIAA: 2× Platinum; RMNZ: Platinum	Birds in the Trap Sing McKnight
"Sweet Sweet"	2016	—	— (Note: "Sweet Sweet" did not enter the Hot R&B/Hip-Hop Songs chart, but peaked at number six on the Bubbling Under R&B/Hip-Hop Singles chart.)	—	—	—	—	—	—	—	—	RIAA: Platinum; MC: Gold	Birds in the Trap Sing McKnight
"Outside" (featuring 21 Savage)	2016	—	— (Note: "Outside" did not enter the Hot R&B/Hip-Hop Songs chart, but peaked at number five on the Bubbling Under R&B/Hip-Hop Singles chart.)	—	—	—	—	—	—	—	—	RIAA: Gold; MC: Gold	Birds in the Trap Sing McKnight
"First Take" (featuring Bryson Tiller)	2016	—	— (Note: "First Take" did not enter the Hot R&B/Hip-Hop Songs chart, but peaked at number seven on the Bubbling Under R&B/Hip-Hop Singles chart.)	—	—	—	—	—	—	—	—	RIAA: Gold	Birds in the Trap Sing McKnight
"Lose"	2016	—	—	—	—	—	—	—	—	—	—	RIAA: Gold; MC: Gold	Birds in the Trap Sing McKnight
"Guidance" (featuring K. Forest)	2016	—	—	—	—	—	—	—	—	—	—	RIAA: Gold	Birds in the Trap Sing McKnight
"Kelly Price" (Migos featuring Travis Scott)	2017	58	23	15	—	55	—	—	— (Note: "Kelly Price" did not enter the NZ Top 40 Singles Chart, but peaked at number six on the NZ Heatseeker Singles Chart.)	—	—		Culture
"Don't Quit" (DJ Khaled and Calvin Harris featuring Travis Scott and Jeremih)	2017	68	30	21	—	50	—	—	— (Note: "Don't Quit" did not enter the NZ Top 40 Singles Chart, but peaked at number two on the NZ Heatseeker Singles Chart.)	—	75		Grateful
"On Everything" (DJ Khaled featuring Travis Scott, Rick Ross, and Big Sean)	2017	88	37	—	—	69	—	—	— (Note: "On Everything" did not enter the NZ Top 40 Singles Chart, but peaked at number ten on the NZ Heatseekers Singles Chart.)	—	—		Grateful
"It's Secured" (DJ Khaled featuring Nas and Travis Scott)	2017	— (Note: "It's Secured" did not chart on the Billboard Hot 100 chart but did peak at number 22 on the Bubbling Under Hot 100 Singles chart.)	— (Note: "It's Secured" did not enter the Hot R&B/Hip-Hop Songs chart, but peaked at number seven on the Bubbling Under R&B/Hip-Hop Singles chart.)	—	—	—	—	—	—	—	—		Grateful
"Down for Life" (DJ Khaled featuring PartyNextDoor, Future, Travis Scott, Rick Ross, and Kodak Black)	2017	— (Note: "Down for Life" did not chart on the Billboard Hot 100 chart but did peak at number 25 on the Bubbling Under Hot 100 Singles chart.)	— (Note: "Down for Life" did not enter the Hot R&B/Hip-Hop Songs chart, but peaked at number nine on the Bubbling Under R&B/Hip-Hop Singles chart.)	—	—	—	—	—	—	—	—		Grateful
"Prayers Up" (Calvin Harris featuring Travis Scott and A-Trak)	2017	—	— (Note: "Prayers Up" did not enter the Hot R&B/Hip-Hop Songs chart, but peaked at number five on the Bubbling Under R&B/Hip-Hop Singles chart.)	—	—	—	—	—	—	—	—		Funk Wav Bounces Vol. 1
"Ghostface Killers" (21 Savage, Offset, and Metro Boomin featuring Travis Scott)	2017	35	14	13	69	14	—	—	— (Note: "Ghostface Killers" did not enter the NZ Top 40 Singles Chart, but peaked at number five on the NZ Heatseeker Singles Chart.)	76	60	RIAA: 2× Platinum; BPI: Silver; MC: Platinum; RMNZ: Platinum	Without Warning
"Go Legend" (Big Sean and Metro Boomin featuring Travis Scott)	2017	67	28	—	—	59	—	—	— (Note: "Go Legend" did not enter the NZ Top 40 Singles Chart, but peaked at number five on the NZ Heatseeker Singles Chart.)	—	—		Double or Nothing
"Modern Slavery" (with Quavo as Huncho Jack)	2017	68	29	—	—	59	—	—	— (Note: "Modern Slavery" did not enter the NZ Top 40 Singles Chart, but peaked at number two on the NZ Heatseeker Singles Chart.)	—	—		Huncho Jack, Jack Huncho
"Black & Chinese" (with Quavo as Huncho Jack)	2017	71	31	—	—	58	—	—	— (Note: "Black and Chinese" did not enter the NZ Top 40 Singles Chart, but peaked at number three on the NZ Heatseeker Singles Chart.)	—	—		Huncho Jack, Jack Huncho
"Eye 2 Eye" (with Quavo as Huncho Jack featuring Takeoff)	2017	65	27	—	—	55	—	—	—	—	—		Huncho Jack, Jack Huncho
"Dubai Shit" (with Quavo as Huncho Jack featuring Offset)	2017	83	35	—	—	63	—	—	—	—	—		Huncho Jack, Jack Huncho
"Huncho Jack" (with Quavo as Huncho Jack)	2017	87	38	—	—	75	—	—	—	—	—		Huncho Jack, Jack Huncho
"Motorcycle Patches" (with Quavo as Huncho Jack)	2017	90	39	—	—	71	—	—	—	—	—		Huncho Jack, Jack Huncho
"Saint" (with Quavo as Huncho Jack)	2017	92	40	—	—	72	—	—	—	—	—		Huncho Jack, Jack Huncho
"Saint Laurent Mask" (with Quavo as Huncho Jack)	2017	— (Note: "Saint Laurent Mask" did not chart on the Billboard Hot 100 chart but did peak at number three on the Bubbling Under Hot 100 Singles chart.)	—	—	—	93	—	—	—	—	—		Huncho Jack, Jack Huncho
"Go" (with Quavo as Huncho Jack)	2017	— (Note: "Go" did not chart on the Billboard Hot 100 chart but did peak at number seven on the Bubbling Under Hot 100 Singles chart.)	—	—	—	100	—	—	—	—	—		Huncho Jack, Jack Huncho
"Moon Rock" (with Quavo as Huncho Jack)	2017	— (Note: "Moon Rock" did not chart on the Billboard Hot 100 chart but did peak at number 10 on the Bubbling Under Hot 100 Singles chart.)	—	—	—	—	—	—	—	—	—		Huncho Jack, Jack Huncho
"How U Feel" (with Quavo as Huncho Jack)	2017	— (Note: "How U Feel" did not chart on the Billboard Hot 100 chart but did peak at number 11 on the Bubbling Under Hot 100 Singles chart.)	—	—	—	—	—	—	—	—	—		Huncho Jack, Jack Huncho
"Where U From" (with Quavo as Huncho Jack)	2017	— (Note: "Where U From" did not chart on the Billboard Hot 100 chart but did peak at number 15 on the Bubbling Under Hot 100 Singles chart.)	—	—	—	—	—	—	—	—	—		Huncho Jack, Jack Huncho
"White Sand" (Migos featuring Travis Scott, Ty Dolla Sign, and Big Sean)	2018	64	31	—	—	58	199	—	—	—	—	RIAA: Gold	Culture II
"Big Shot" (with Kendrick Lamar)	2018	71	35	—	—	54	172	69	—	58	55	ARIA: Gold; RMNZ: Gold	Black Panther: The Album
"Carousel"	2018	24	15	13	99	20	70	30	30	73	29	RIAA: Platinum; ARIA: Gold; MC: Platinum; RMNZ: Gold	Astroworld
"R.I.P. Screw"	2018	26	17	15	—	28	87	—	—	— (Note: "R.I.P. Screw" did not enter the Swedish Singellista Chart, but peaked at number three on the Sweden Heatseeker Chart.)	— (Note: "R.I.P. Screw" did not enter the UK Singles Chart, as chart rules only allow three songs per artist to chart within the top one hundred at a time, but peaked at number 56 on the UK Streaming Chart.)	RIAA: Platinum; MC: Platinum; ARIA: Gold; RMNZ: Gold	Astroworld
"Stop Trying to Be God"	2018	27	18	16	87	19	76	68	—	— (Note: "Stop Trying to Be God" did not enter the Swedish Singellista Chart, but peaked at number one on the Sweden Heatseeker Chart.)	70	RIAA: Platinum; MC: Platinum; ARIA: Gold; RMNZ: Gold; BPI: Silver	Astroworld
"No Bystanders"	2018	31	22	19	—	34	105	—	—	— (Note: "No Bystanders" did not enter the Swedish Singellista Chart, but peaked at number two on the Sweden Heatseeker Chart.)	— (Note: "No Bystanders" did not enter the UK Singles Chart, as chart rules only allow three songs per artist to chart within the top one hundred at a time, but peaked at number 67 on the UK Streaming Chart.)	RIAA: 2× Platinum; MC: Platinum; ARIA: Gold; RMNZ: Platinum	Astroworld
"Skeletons"	2018	47	27	24	—	42	110	—	—	— (Note: "Skeletons" did not enter the Swedish Singellista Chart, but peaked at number 12 on the Sweden Heatseeker Chart.)	— (Note: "Skeletons" did not enter the UK Singles Chart, as chart rules only allow three songs per artist to chart within the top one hundred at a time, but peaked at number 81 on the UK Streaming Chart.)	RIAA: 2× Platinum; MC: Platinum; RMNZ: Platinum; BPI: Silver	Astroworld
"5% Tint"	2018	36	23	20	—	36	131	—	—	— (Note: "5% Tint" did not enter the Swedish Singellista Chart, but peaked at number 10 on the Sweden Heatseeker Chart.)	— (Note: "5% Tint" did not enter the UK Singles Chart, as chart rules only allow three songs per artist to chart within the top one hundred at a time, but peaked at number 85 on the UK Streaming Chart.)	RIAA: 2× Platinum; MC: 2× Platinum; RMNZ: Platinum	Astroworld
"NC-17"	2018	41	25	22	—	40	127	—	—	— (Note: "NC-17" did not enter the Swedish Singellista Chart, but peaked at number 13 on the Sweden Heatseeker Chart.)	— (Note: "NC-17" did not enter the UK Singles Chart, as chart rules only allow three songs per artist to chart within the top one hundred at a time, but peaked at number 93 on the UK Streaming Chart.)	RIAA: Platinum; MC: Platinum	Astroworld
"Astrothunder"	2018	48	28	25	—	43	134	—	—	— (Note: "Astrothunder" did not enter the Swedish Singellista Chart, but peaked at number 19 on the Sweden Heatseeker Chart.)	— (Note: "Astrothunder" did not enter the UK Singles Chart, as chart rules only allow three songs per artist to chart within the top one hundred at a time, but peaked at number 90 on the UK Streaming Chart.)	RIAA: 2× Platinum; MC: Gold; BPI: Silver; ARIA: Gold; RMNZ: Platinum	Astroworld
"Can't Say"	2018	38	24	21	—	35	128	—	—	— (Note: "Can't Say" did not enter the Swedish Singellista Chart, but peaked at number nine on the Sweden Heatseeker Chart.)	— (Note: "Can't Say" did not enter the UK Singles Chart, as chart rules only allow three songs per artist to chart within the top one hundred at a time, but peaked at number 79 on the UK Streaming Chart.)	RIAA: 4× Platinum; ARIA: Platinum; BPI: Platinum; MC: 3× Platinum; RMNZ: 2× Platinum	Astroworld
"Who? What!"	2018	43	26	23	—	41	153	—	—	— (Note: "Who? What!" did not enter the Swedish Singellista Chart, but peaked at number 14 on the Sweden Heatseeker Chart.)	— (Note: "Who? What!" did not enter the UK Singles Chart, as chart rules only allow three songs per artist to chart within the top one hundred at a time, but peaked at number 98 on the UK Streaming Chart.)	RIAA: Platinum; MC: Gold; RMNZ: Gold	Astroworld
"Houstonfornication"	2018	53	30	—	—	50	157	—	—	—	—	RIAA: Platinum; ARIA: Gold; BPI: Silver; MC: Gold; RMNZ: Gold	Astroworld
"Coffee Bean"	2018	68	35	—	—	61	—	—	—	—	—	RIAA: Platinum; BPI: Silver; MC: Platinum; RMNZ: Gold	Astroworld
"Let It Fly" (Lil Wayne featuring Travis Scott)	2018	10	8	8	71	15	197	46	— (Note: "Let It Fly" did not enter the NZ Top 40 Singles Chart, but peaked at number five on the NZ Hot Singles Chart.)	— (Note: "Let It Fly" did not enter the Swedish Singellista Chart, but peaked at number four on the Sweden Heatseeker Chart.)	41	RIAA: Platinum	Tha Carter V
"Rerun" (Quavo featuring Travis Scott)	2018	88	41	—	—	70	—	—	— (Note: "Rerun" did not enter the NZ Top 40 Singles Chart, but peaked at number 15on the NZ Hot Singles Chart.)	—	—		Quavo Huncho
"Overdue" (Metro Boomin featuring Travis Scott)	2018	62	30	—	—	67	—	—	— (Note: "Overdue" did not enter the NZ Top 40 Singles Chart, but peaked at number seven on the NZ Hot Singles Chart.)	—	86	RIAA: Platinum; ARIA: Platinum; MC: Platinum; RMNZ: Platinum	Not All Heroes Wear Capes
"Dreamcatcher" (Metro Boomin featuring Swae Lee and Travis Scott)	2018	72	36	—	—	68	—	87	—	—	—	ARIA: Gold; MC: Platinum	Not All Heroes Wear Capes
"Up to Something" (Metro Boomin featuring Travis Scott and Young Thug)	2018	100	—	—	—	96	—	—	—	—	—		Not All Heroes Wear Capes
"Only 1 (Interlude)" (Metro Boomin featuring Travis Scott)	2018	— (Note: "Only 1" did not enter the US Billboard Hot 100, but peaked at number 18 on the Bubbling Under Hot 100 chart.)	—	—	—	—	—	—	—	—	—		Not All Heroes Wear Capes
"No More" (Metro Boomin featuring Travis Scott, Kodak Black, and 21 Savage)	2018	79	40	—	—	71	—	—	—	—	—	MC: Gold	Not All Heroes Wear Capes
"Out for the Night, Pt. 2" (21 Savage featuring Travis Scott)	2018	—	—	—	—	—	—	—	—	—	—	RIAA: Gold	I Am > I Was (Deluxe)
"Legacy" (Offset featuring Travis Scott and 21 Savage)	2019	49	22	22	—	51	—	—	— (Note: "Legacy" did not enter the NZ Top 40 Singles Chart, but peaked at number eight on the NZ Hot Singles Chart.)	—	—	RIAA: Platinum	Father of 4
"Whip" (2 Chainz featuring Travis Scott)	2019	75	31	—	—	99	—	—	— (Note: "Whip" did not enter the NZ Top 40 Singles Chart, but peaked at number 19 on the NZ Hot Singles Chart.)	—	—		Rap or Go to the League
"Celebrate" (DJ Khaled featuring Travis Scott and Post Malone)	2019	52	23	19	—	37	—	56	— (Note: "Celebrate" did not enter the NZ Top 40 Singles Chart, but peaked at number 11 on the NZ Hot Singles Chart.)	—	48	RIAA: Gold	Father of Asahd
"Bless Em" (Quality Control and Takeoff featuring Travis Scott)	2019	—	—	—	—	—	—	—	— (Note: "Bless Em" did not enter the NZ Top 40 Singles Chart, but peaked at number 38 on the NZ Hot Singles Chart.)	—	—		Control the Streets, Volume 2
"Hop Off a Jet" (Young Thug featuring Travis Scott)	2019	— (Note: "Hop Off a Jet" did not enter the Billboard Hot 100, but peaked at number one on the Bubbling Under Hot 100 chart.)	41	—	—	94	—	—	— (Note: "Hop Off a Jet" did not enter the NZ Top 40 Singles Chart, but peaked at number three on the NZ Hot Singles Chart.)	—	—		So Much Fun (Deluxe)
"What to Do?" (with JackBoys featuring Don Toliver)	2019	56	26	20	86	38	102	64	— (Note: "What to Do?" did not enter the NZ Top 40 Singles Chart, but peaked at number four on the NZ Hot Singles Chart.)	—	57	RIAA: Platinum; MC: Gold	JackBoys
"Gatti" (with JackBoys and Pop Smoke)	2019	69	33	24	—	61	—	—	—	—	59	RIAA: 2× Platinum; SNEP: Gold; RMNZ: Platinum; BPI: Silver	JackBoys
"Second Emotion" (Justin Bieber featuring Travis Scott)	2020	— (Note: "Second Emotion" did not enter the Billboard Hot 100, but peaked at number seven on the Bubbling Under Hot 100 Singles chart, which acts as a 25-song extension to the Hot 100.)	—	—	95	76	—	—	—	—	—		Changes
"Euphoria" (Don Toliver featuring Travis Scott and Kaash Paige)	2020	— (Note: "Euphoria" did not enter the US Billboard Hot 100, but peaked at number three on the Bubbling Under Hot 100 chart.)	—	—	—	—	—	—	— (Note: "Euphoria" did not enter the NZ Top 40 Singles Chart, but peaked at number 15 on the NZ Hot Singles Chart.)	—	—	RIAA: Gold	Heaven or Hell
"The Blinding" (Jay Electronica featuring Travis Scott)	2020	— (Note: "The Blinding" did not enter the Billboard Hot 100, but peaked at number nine on the Bubbling Under Hot 100 Singles chart, which acts as a 25-song extension to the Hot 100.)	—	—	—	—	—	—	—	—	—		A Written Testimony
"Solitaires" (Future featuring Travis Scott)	2020	32	15	13	—	46	155	62	— (Note: "Solitaires" did not enter the NZ Top 40 Singles Chart, but peaked at number five on the NZ Hot Singles Chart.)	—	59	RIAA: Platinum; MC: Platinum	High Off Life
"Top Floor" (Gunna featuring Travis Scott)	2020	55	22	19	—	73	185	—	— (Note: "Top Floor" did not enter the NZ Top 40 Singles Chart, but peaked at number four on the NZ Hot Singles Chart.)	—	90	MC: Gold	Wunna
"Lithuania" (Big Sean featuring Travis Scott)	2020	69	26	23	—	52	—	98	— (Note: "Lithuania" did not enter the NZ Top 40 Singles Chart, but peaked at number 10 on the NZ Hot Singles Chart.)	—	—		Detroit 2
"Diamonds Dancing" (YSL Records, Young Thug, and Gunna featuring Travis Scott)	2021	46	21	16	—	39	—	97	— (Note: "Diamonds Dancing" did not enter the NZ Top 40 Singles Chart, but peaked at number five on the NZ Hot Singles Chart.)	—	80		Slime Language 2
"Hats Off" (with Lil Baby and Lil Durk)	2021	16	5	3	—	27	—	78	— (Note: "Hats Off" did not enter the NZ Top 40 Singles Chart, but peaked at number six on the NZ Hot Singles Chart.)	—	63	RIAA: Platinum	The Voice of the Heroes
"Praise God" (Kanye West featuring Travis Scott and Baby Keem)	2021	20	10	9	13	17	76	58	—	50	93	RIAA: Platinum; BPI: Silver; MC: Gold; RMNZ: Platinum	Donda
"Fair Trade" (Drake featuring Travis Scott)	2021	3	3	3	3	4	14	4	3	17	3	ARIA: 3× Platinum; SNEP: Gold; RMNZ: 2× Platinum; BPI: Platinum	Certified Lover Boy
"You" (Don Toliver featuring Travis Scott)	2021	— (Note: "You" did not enter the Billboard Hot 100, but peaked at number 17 on the Bubbling Under Hot 100 chart.)	—	—	—	—	—	—	— (Note: "You" did not enter the NZ Top 40 Singles Chart, but peaked at number 14 on the NZ Hot Singles Chart.)	—	—	RIAA: Platinum; MC: Gold; RMNZ: Gold	Life of a Don
"Let's Pray" (DJ Khaled featuring Don Toliver and Travis Scott)	2022	86	28	—	—	75	—	—	—	—	—		God Did
"Pussy & Millions" (Drake and 21 Savage featuring Travis Scott)	2022	6	5	5	5	6	96	95	5	47	—	ARIA: Gold; RMNZ: Gold	Her Loss
"Raindrops (Insane)" (with Metro Boomin)	2022	31	10	6	67	15	123	—	—	—	—	MC: Gold	Heroes & Villains
"Trance" (with Metro Boomin and Young Thug)	2022	42	14	8	—	24	—	42	― (Note: "Trance" did not enter the NZ Top 40 Singles Chart, but peaked at number 17 on the NZ Hot Singles Chart.)	—	60	RIAA: Platinum; ARIA: Platinum; MC: Platinum; RMNZ: Platinum; BPI: Gold	Heroes & Villains
"Niagara Falls (Foot or 2)" (with Metro Boomin and 21 Savage)	2022	27	8	5	43	8	154	32	37	— (Note: "Niagara Falls (Foot or 2)" did not enter the Swedish Singellista Chart, but peaked at number five on the Sweden Heatseeker Chart.)	46	ARIA: Platinum; MC: Platinum; RMNZ: Platinum; BPI: Silver	Heroes & Villains
"Lock on Me" (with Metro Boomin and Future)	2022	72	27	20	—	54	—	—	—	—	—		Heroes & Villains
"Open Arms" (SZA featuring Travis Scott)	2022	54	22	—	81	51	—	—	29	—	63	RIAA: 3× Platinum; MC: 2× Platinum; RMNZ: 2× Platinum; BPI: Silver	SOS
"Embarrassed" (Don Toliver featuring Travis Scott)	2023	— (Note: "Embarrassed" did not enter the US Billboard Hot 100, but peaked at number 11 on the Bubbling Under Hot 100 chart.)	40	24	—	—	—	—	— (Note: "Embarrassed" did not enter the NZ Top 40 Singles Chart, but peaked at number 18 on the NZ Hot Singles Chart.)	—	—	MC: Platinum	Love Sick (Deluxe)
"Wit da Racks" (Young Thug featuring 21 Savage, Travis Scott, and Yak Gotti)	2023	56	18	14	—	70	—	—	— (Note: "Wit da Racks" did not enter the NZ Top 40 Singles Chart, but peaked at number 14 on the NZ Hot Singles Chart.)	—	—		Business Is Business
"Abracadabra" (Young Thug featuring Travis Scott)	2023	97	39	—	—	—	—	—	—	—	—		Business Is Business
"Aye" (Lil Uzi Vert featuring Travis Scott)	2023	31	11	7	—	44	—	68	— (Note: "Aye" did not enter the NZ Top 40 Singles Chart, but peaked at number four on the NZ Hot Singles Chart.)	—	93		Pink Tape
"Hyaena"	2023	14	7	7	16	15	23	19	13	59	21	RIAA: Gold; MC: Gold	Utopia
"Thank God"	2023	16	9	8	18	16	14	—	20	74	— (Note: "Thank God" did not enter the UK Singles Chart, as chart rules only allow three songs per artist to chart within the top one hundred at a time, but peaked at number 35 on the UK Streaming Chart.)	RIAA: Gold; MC: Platinum	Utopia
"Modern Jam" (featuring Teezo Touchdown)	2023	23	13	12	27	23	33	—	23	— (Note: "Modern Jam" did not enter the Swedish Singellista Chart, but peaked at number three on the Swedish Heatseeker Chart.)	— (Note: "Modern Jam" did not enter the UK Singles Chart, as chart rules only allow three songs per artist to chart within the top one hundred at a time, but peaked at number 50 on the UK Streaming Chart.)	RIAA: Gold; MC: Gold	Utopia
"My Eyes"	2023	19	12	11	19	18	18	—	14	69	65	RIAA: 2× Platinum; MC: 2× Platinum; SNEP: Gold; RMNZ: Platinum; BPI: Gold	Utopia
"God's Country"	2023	28	17	15	40	27	39	—	38	— (Note: "God's Country" did not enter the Swedish Singellista Chart, but peaked at number seven on the Swedish Heatseeker Chart.)	— (Note: "God's Country" did not enter the UK Singles Chart, as chart rules only allow three songs per artist to chart within the top one hundred at a time, but peaked at number 63 on the UK Streaming Chart.)	RIAA: Gold; MC: Gold	Utopia
"Sirens"	2023	27	16	14	37	24	36	—	34	— (Note: "Sirens" did not enter the Swedish Singellista Chart, but peaked at number four on the Swedish Heatseeker Chart.)	— (Note: "Sirens" did not enter the UK Singles Chart, as chart rules only allow three songs per artist to chart within the top one hundred at a time, but peaked at number 56 on the UK Streaming Chart.)	RIAA: Gold; MC: Gold	Utopia
"Topia Twins" (featuring Rob49 and 21 Savage)	2023	17	10	9	29	17	60	—	17	— (Note: "Topia Twins" did not enter the Swedish Singellista Chart, but peaked at number two on the Swedish Heatseeker Chart.)	— (Note: "Topia Twins" did not enter the UK Singles Chart, as chart rules only allow three songs per artist to chart within the top one hundred at a time, but peaked at number 59 on the UK Streaming Chart.)	RIAA: Platinum; MC: Platinum; RMNZ: Gold	Utopia
"Circus Maximus" (featuring the Weeknd and Swae Lee)	2023	36	19	17	49	32	57	—	—	— (Note: "Circus Maximus" did not enter the Swedish Singellista Chart, but peaked at number 10 on the Swedish Heatseeker Chart.)	— (Note: "Circus Maximus" did not enter the UK Singles Chart, as chart rules only allow three songs per artist to chart within the top one hundred at a time, but peaked at number 87 on the UK Streaming Chart.)	RIAA: Gold; MC: Gold	Utopia
"Parasail" (featuring Yung Lean and Dave Chappelle)	2023	53	24	22	91	46	92	—	—	—	—		Utopia
"Skitzo" (featuring Young Thug)	2023	34	18	16	48	29	83	—	36	— (Note: "Skitzo" did not enter the Swedish Singellista Chart, but peaked at number 12 on the Swedish Heatseeker Chart.)	— (Note: "Skitzo" did not enter the UK Singles Chart, as chart rules only allow three songs per artist to chart within the top one hundred at a time, but peaked at number 86 on the UK Streaming Chart.)	MC: Gold	Utopia
"Lost Forever" (featuring Westside Gunn)	2023	46	22	20	71	39	112	—	—	—	—		Utopia
"Looove" (featuring Kid Cudi)	2023	49	23	21	73	40	107	—	—	—	—		Utopia
"Telekinesis" (featuring SZA and Future)	2023	26	9	8	19	18	64	38	13	74	31	RIAA: Platinum; ARIA: Gold; MC: 2× Platinum; BPI: Silver; RMNZ: Platinum	Utopia
"Til Further Notice" (featuring James Blake and 21 Savage)	2023	38	20	18	52	33	86	—	39	—	— (Note: "Til Further Notice" did not enter the UK Singles Chart, as chart rules only allow three songs per artist to chart within the top one hundred at a time, but peaked at number 98 on the UK Streaming Chart.)	RIAA: Platinum; BPI: Silver; MC: Platinum; RMNZ: Gold	Utopia
"Get Off Me" (with Kid Cudi)	2024	— (Note: "Get Off Me" did not enter the US Billboard Hot 100, but peaked at number three on the Bubbling Under Hot 100 chart.)	48	—	—	—	—	—	— (Note: "Get Off Me" did not enter the NZ Top 40 Singles Chart, but peaked at number 11 on the NZ Hot Singles Chart.)	—	—		Insano
"Fuk Sumn" (Kanye West and Ty Dolla Sign as ¥$ featuring Playboi Carti and Travis Scott)	2024	23	10	7	33	17	181	—	10	60	— (Note: "Fuk Sumn" did not enter the UK Singles Chart, but peaked at number 39 on the UK Independent Singles Chart.)		Vultures 1
"Cinderella" (with Future and Metro Boomin)	2024	6	3	3	40	11	103	29	28	— (Note: "Cinderella" did not enter the Swedish Singellista Chart, but peaked at number five on the Sweden Heatseeker Chart.)	20	MC: Platinum	We Don't Trust You
"Ice Age" (Don Toliver featuring Travis Scott)	2024	92	28	24	—	—	—	—	— (Note: "Ice Age" did not enter the NZ Top 40 Singles Chart, but peaked at number 16 on the NZ Hot Singles Chart.)	—	—		Hardstone Psycho
"Stuff" (Lil Baby featuring Travis Scott)	2025	51	13	10	—	56	—	—	— (Note: "Stuff" did not enter the NZ Top 40 Singles Chart, but peaked at number seven on the NZ Hot Singles Chart.)	—	82		WHAM
"Houstatlantaville" (EST Gee featuring Lil Baby and Travis Scott)	2025	— (Note: "Houstatlantaville" did not enter the Billboard Hot 100, but peaked at number 18 on the Bubbling Under Hot 100 Singles chart, which acts as a 25-song extension to the Hot 100.)	50	—	—	—	—	—	—	—	—		I Aint Feeling You
"Reflections Laughing" (with the Weeknd and Florence and the Machine)	2025	53	—	—	75	29	44	—	— (Note: "Reflections Laughing" did not enter the NZ Top 40 Singles Chart, but peaked at number five on the NZ Hot Singles Chart.)	82	— (Note: "Reflections Laughing" did not enter the UK Singles Chart, as chart rules only allow three songs per artist to chart within the top one hundred at a time, but peaked at number 72 on the Official UK Streaming chart.)		Hurry Up Tomorrow
"Crush" (with Playboi Carti)	2025	20	8	8	29	26	83	35	19	— (Note: "Crush" did not enter the Swedish Singellista Chart, but peaked at number five on the Sweden Heatseeker Chart.)	— (Note: "Crush" did not enter the UK Singles Chart, as chart rules only allow three songs per artist to chart within the top one hundred at a time, but peaked at number 40 on the Official UK Streaming chart.)		Music
"Philly" (with Playboi Carti)	2025	28	14	12	49	32	125	—	35	— (Note: "Philly" did not enter the Swedish Singellista Chart, but peaked at number five on the Sweden Heatseeker Chart.)	— (Note: "Crush" did not enter the UK Singles Chart, as chart rules only allow three songs per artist to chart within the top one hundred at a time, but peaked at number 64 on the Official UK Streaming chart.)		Music
"Charge Dem Hoes a Fee" (with Playboi Carti and Future)	2025	49	24	22	—	58	—	—	—	—	—		Music
"Wake Up F1lthy" (with Playboi Carti)	2025	52	25	23	87	55	—	—	—	—	— (Note: "Wake Up F1lthy" did not enter the UK Singles Chart, as chart rules only allow three songs per artist to chart within the top one hundred at a time, but peaked at number 94 on the Official UK Streaming chart.)		Music
"Champain & Vacay" (with Don Toliver)	2025	53	13	7	78	55	—	—	— (Note: "Champain & Vacay" did not enter the NZ Top 40 Singles Chart, but peaked at number seven on the NZ Hot Singles Chart.)	—	60		JackBoys 2
"Contest" (with SoFaygo)	2025	— (Note: "Contest" did not enter the Billboard Hot 100, but peaked at number 13 on the Bubbling Under Hot 100 chart, which acts as a 25-song extension to the Hot 100.)	46	—	—	—	—	—	—	—	—		JackBoys 2
"Where Was You" (with Playboi Carti and Future)	2025	74	25	13	—	77	—	—	—	—	—		JackBoys 2
"Beep Beep" (with SahBabii)	2025	— (Note: "Beep Beep" did not enter the Billboard Hot 100, but peaked at number 18 on the Bubbling Under Hot 100 chart, which acts as a 25-song extension to the Hot 100.)	—	—	—	—	—	—	—	—	—		JackBoys 2
"Outside" (with YoungBoy Never Broke Again)	2025	— (Note: "Outside" did not enter the Billboard Hot 100, but peaked at number 19 on the Bubbling Under Hot 100 chart, which acts as a 25-song extension to the Hot 100.)	—	—	—	—	—	—	—	—	—		JackBoys 2
"Da Wizard"	2025	— (Note: "Da Wizard" did not enter the Billboard Hot 100, but peaked at number 19 on the Bubbling Under Hot 100 chart, which acts as a 25-song extension to the Hot 100.)	45	—	—	—	—	—	— (Note: "Da Wizard" did not enter the NZ Top 40 Singles Chart, but peaked at number 17 on the NZ Hot Singles Chart.)	—	—		JackBoys 2
"Pipe Down" (Young Thug featuring Travis Scott)	2025	—	44	—	—	—	—	—	— (Note: "Pipe Down" did not enter the NZ Top 40 Singles Chart, but peaked at number 15 on the NZ Hot Singles Chart.)	—	—		UY Scuti
"Tsunami" (DJ Snake featuring Future and Travis Scott)	2025	—	—	—	—	—	—	—	— (Note: "Tsunami" did not enter the NZ Top 40 Singles Chart, but peaked at number 22 on the NZ Hot Singles Chart.)	—	—		Nomad
"Rosary" (Don Toliver featuring Travis Scott)	2026	36	13	9	—	45	—	—	— (Note: "Rosary" did not enter the NZ Top 40 Singles Chart, but peaked at number 6 on the NZ Hot Singles Chart.)	—	—		Octane
"When I'm Home" (with James Blake)	2026	—	—	—	—	—	—	—	— (Note: "When I'm Home" did not enter the NZ Top 40 Singles Chart, but peaked at number 21 on the NZ Hot Singles Chart.)	—	—		The Odyssey (Original Motion Picture Soundtrack)
"Father" (Kanye West featuring Travis Scott)	2026	21	6	2	32	25	—	31	33	77	27		Bully
"—" denotes a title that did not chart, or was not released in that territory.

== Guest appearances ==
List of non-single guest appearances, with other performing artists, showing year released and album name
Title	Year	Other artist(s)	Album
"Yes Lord"	2012	Audio Push, King Chip	Inland Empire
"I Get It"	2012	Meek Mill	Dreamchasers 2
"Sin City"	2012	John Legend, Teyana Taylor, Cyhi the Prynce, Malik Yusef	Cruel Summer
"Nervous"	2012	Wynter Gordon	Human Condition: Doleo
"Blocka"	2013	Pusha T, Popcaan	Wrath of Caine
"Enormous"	2013	Hit-Boy, Cocaine 80s, Kent M$NEY	All I've Ever Dreamed Of
"Back Up" (Remix)	2013	Chuck Inglish	Droptops
"God Level"	2013	none	DJ Drama Presents: XXL 2013's Freshmen Class
"I'm Leanin'"	2013	Meek Mill, Birdman, Diddy	Dreamchasers 3
"Crown'"	2013	Jay-Z	Magna Carta Holy Grail
"Vulnerable"	2013	Tinashe	Black Water
"Familiar"	2014	Ty Dolla Sign, Fredo Santana	Beach House EP
"Hell You Sayin'"	2014	T.I., Iggy Azalea, Young Dro	SXEW (South by East West)
"Fuck & Smoke"	2014	Trav, Meek Mill	Push II
"Brand New Choppa"	2014	T.I., Meek Mill, Yung Booke, Young Dro	G.D.O.D. II
"Ghosttown"	2014	Yung Lean	Unknown Memory
"Jus Know"	2014	PartyNextDoor	Colours
"White Girls"	2015	Belly	Up for Days
"Night Riders"	2015	Major Lazer, 2 Chainz, Pusha T, Mad Cobra	Peace Is the Mission
"5 Mo"	2015	French Montana, Lil Durk	Casino Life 2: Brown Bag Legend
"Go All Night"	2015	Hit-Boy	This Thing is Happening
"Miss My Dawgs"	2015	Meek Mill, Strap	This Thing is Happening
"Company"	2015	Drake	If You're Reading This It's Too Late
"No Feelings"	2015	PartyNextDoor	none
"On My Vibe"	2015	Duke	Lil Duke
"Party 101"	2015	Audio Push	Push 8
"No Sense"	2015	Justin Bieber	Purpose
"Palm Trees"	2015	P. Reign	Off the Books
"Trap In Mexico"	2016	Trae tha Truth	none
"Waves" (Remix)	2016	Miguel	Rogue Waves - EP
"Man of My City"	2016	French Montana, Big Sean	Wave Gods
"Money Go"	2016	Belly	Another Day in Paradise
"Uber Everywhere" (Remix)	2016	MadeinTYO	You Are Forgiven
"Tourist"	2016	DJ Khaled, Lil Wayne	Major Key
"Oh Me Oh My"	2016	DJ Snake, Migos, G4SHI	Encore
"No Limit" (Remix)	2016	Usher	none
"In Common" (Remix)	2016	Alicia Keys, Kanye West	none
"Floyd Mayweather"	2016	Young Thug, Gucci Mane, Gunna	Jeffery
"Kelly Price"	2017	Migos	Culture
"Fish n Grits"	2017	Wale	Shine
"Me or Us" (Remix)	2017	Young Thug	Beautiful Thugger Girls (Vinyl Version)
"On Everything"	2017	DJ Khaled, Rick Ross, Big Sean	Grateful
"It's Secured"	2017	DJ Khaled, Nas	Grateful
"Don't Quit"	2017	DJ Khaled, Calvin Harris, Jeremih	Grateful
"Down for Life"	2017	DJ Khaled, PartyNextDoor, Future, Rick Ross, Kodak Black	Grateful
"Prayers Up"	2017	Calvin Harris, A-Trak	Funk Wav Bounces Vol. 1
"Jump"	2017	French Montana	Jungle Rules
"White Dress"	2017	Louis B., King Louie	Neon Rain II
"Fingers Blue"	2017	Smokepurpp	Deadstar
"Ghostface Killers"	2017	21 Savage, Offset, Metro Boomin	Without Warning
"Go Legend"	2017	Big Sean, Metro Boomin	Double or Nothing
"Mediterranean"	2017	Quality Control, Offset	Control the Streets Volume 1
"White Sand"	2018	Migos, Ty Dolla Sign, Big Sean	Culture II
"Big Shot"	2018	Kendrick Lamar	Black Panther: The Album - Music from and Inspired By
"Heavy Camp"	2018	Blac Youngsta	2.23
"Vodka"	2018	London Jae	Gunz & Roses
"Let It Fly"	2018	Lil Wayne	Tha Carter V
"Rerun"	2018	Quavo	Quavo Huncho
"Overdue"	2018	Metro Boomin	Not All Heroes Wear Capes
"Dreamcatcher"	2018	Metro Boomin, Swae Lee	Not All Heroes Wear Capes
"Up to Something"	2018	Metro Boomin, Young Thug	Not All Heroes Wear Capes
"Only 1 (Interlude)"	2018	Metro Boomin	Not All Heroes Wear Capes
"No More"	2018	Metro Boomin, Kodak Black, 21 Savage	Not All Heroes Wear Capes
"Out for the Night, Pt. 2"	2018	21 Savage	I Am Greater Than I Was
"Legacy"	2019	Offset, 21 Savage	Father of 4
"Whip"	2019	2 Chainz	Rap or Go to the League
"Celebrate"	2019	DJ Khaled, Post Malone	Father of Asahd
"The Relays"	2019	Maxo Kream	Brandon Banks
"Bless Em"	2019	Quality Control, Takeoff	Control the Streets, Volume 2
"Texas Cyclone"	2019	Sauce Walka	Sauce Ghetto Gospel 2
"Hop Off a Jet"	2019	Young Thug	So Much Fun (Deluxe)
"Second Emotion"	2020	Justin Bieber	Changes
"Euphoria"	2020	Don Toliver, Kaash Paige	Heaven or Hell
"The Blinding"	2020	Jay Electronica	A Written Testimony
"Solitaires"	2020	Future	High Off Life
"Top Floor"	2020	Gunna	Wunna
"Wavy" (Remix)	2020	Lil Keed	Trapped on Cleveland 3
"Lithuania"	2020	Big Sean	Detroit 2
"Diamonds Dancing"	2021	YSL Records, Young Thug, Gunna	Slime Language 2
"Hats Off"	2021	Lil Baby, Lil Durk	The Voice of the Heroes
"Praise God"	2021	Kanye West, Baby Keem	Donda
"Fair Trade"	2021	Drake	Certified Lover Boy
"You"	2021	Don Toliver	Life of a Don
"Let's Pray"	2022	DJ Khaled, Don Toliver	God Did
"Pussy & Millions"	2022	Drake, 21 Savage	Her Loss
"Raindrops (Insane)"	2022	Metro Boomin	Heroes & Villains
"Trance"	2022	Metro Boomin, Young Thug	Heroes & Villains
"Niagara Falls (Foot or 2)"	2022	Metro Boomin, 21 Savage	Heroes & Villains
"Lock on Me"	2022	Metro Boomin, Future	Heroes & Villains
"Open Arms"	2022	SZA	SOS
"Embarrassed"	2023	Don Toliver	Love Sick (Deluxe)
"Wit da Racks"	2023	Young Thug, 21 Savage, Yak Gotti	Business Is Business
"Abracadabra"	2023	Young Thug	Business Is Business
"Aye"	2023	Lil Uzi Vert	Pink Tape
"Get Off Me"	2024	Kid Cudi	Insano
"Fuk Sumn"	2024	¥$ (Kanye West, Ty Dolla Sign), Playboi Carti	Vultures 1
"Cinderella"	2024	Future, Metro Boomin	We Don't Trust You
"Ice Age"	2024	Don Toliver	Hardstone Psycho
"Inside"	2024	Don Toliver	Hardstone Psycho
"Money Counter"	2024	Sauce Walka	Saucefather 2
"Cr@sh"	2024	Strick	All Time High
"Stuff"	2025	Lil Baby	WHAM
"Houstatlantaville"	2025	EST Gee, Lil Baby	I Aint Feeling You
"Reflections Laughing"	2025	The Weeknd, Florence and the Machine	Hurry Up Tomorrow
"Crush"	2025	Playboi Carti	Music
"Philly"	2025	Playboi Carti	Music
"Charge Dem Hoes a Fee"	2025	Playboi Carti, Future	Music
"Wake Up F1lthy"	2025	Playboi Carti	Music
"Pipe Down"	2025	Young Thug	UY Scuti
"Mixed Emotions"	2025	Ty Dolla Sign, Leon Thomas III	Tycoon
"Tsunami"	2025	DJ Snake, Future	Nomad
"Rosary"	2026	Don Toliver	Octane
"Facts"	2026	Chase B, Big Sean	Be Very Afraid (Vol. 1)
"When I'm Home"	2026	James Blake, Ludwig Göransson	The Odyssey (Original Motion Picture Soundtrack)
"Eaters"	2026	YSL Records, Young Thug, Future, Yeat, Tezzus	Slime Language 3
"Gass"	2026	Nemzzz	Locked In
"Just Might Go"	2026	Yung Miami	Watch Dis!

== Music videos ==
The videography of American rapper and record producer Travis Scott consists of 15 music videos as a lead artist, and 12 television appearances.

Year	Title	Director	Artist(s)
As main performer
2012	"LIGHTS(LOVE SICK)"	Travis Scott	featuring Daron Eubanks
2012	"THAT B¡TCH CRAZY"	Travis Scott and Tony Loney	
2013	"Quintana"	Nathaniel Brown	featuring Wale additional vocals from ASAP Bari
2013	"Upper Echelon"	—N/a	featuring T.I. and 2 Chainz
2013	"Uptown"	—N/a	featuring ASAP Ferg
2013	"Shit On You"	—N/a	additional vocals from James Fauntleroy
2014	"Don't Play"	Travis Scott	featuring Big Sean and The 1975
2014	"Mamacita"	Grant Singer	featuring Rich Homie Quan and Young Thug
2015	"Antidote"	Steve Carr	
2015	"Piss On Your Grave"	Nabil Elderkin	featuring Kanye West
2016	"Pick Up the Phone"	Taylor Cohen	with Young Thug featuring Quavo additional vocals from Starrah
2016	"90210"	Hype Williams	featuring Kacy Hill additional vocals from Chantel Jeffries
2016	"Beibs in the Trap"	RJ Sanchez	featuring Nav
2017	"Goosebumps"	BRTHR	featuring Kendrick Lamar
2017	"Birds in the Trap"	Fleur Fortuné	
2017	"Butterfly Effect"	BRTHR	
2018	"Stargazing	Nabil Elderkin	
2018	"STOP TRYING TO BE GOD"	Dave Meyers	featuring James Blake, Philip Bailey, Kid Cudi and Stevie Wonder additional vocals from BJ the Chicago Kid
2018	"Sicko Mode"	Dave Meyers	featuring Drake additional vocals from Swae Lee, Big Hawk and Luke
2018	"Yosemite"	Nabil Elderkin	featuring Gunna, and Nav
2019	"CAN'T SAY"	Nathalie Canguilhem	featuring Don Toliver guitar by John Mayer
2019	"Wake Up"	Jonah Hill	featuring The Weeknd guitar by John Mayer
2019	"Highest in the Room"	Dave Meyers and Travis Scott	
2019	"GANG GANG"	CACTUS JACK & WHITE TRASH TYLER	featuring Sheck Wes, Don Toliver, Luxury Tax 50 and CACTUS JACK additional vocals from Oggizery Los
2019	"JACKBOYS"	CACTUS JACK & WHITE TRASH TYLER	appearance by Julia Fox
2019	"GATTI"	CACTUS JACK & WHITE TRASH TYLER	featuring JackBoys and Pop Smoke
2020	"OUT WEST"	CACTUS JACK & WHITE TRASH TYLER	featuring JackBoys and Young Thug appearance by Quincy Jones
2020	“Franchise”	Travis Scott	featuring Young Thug and M.I.A.
2021	"Escape Plan"	Travis Scott, Eliel Ford, and White Trash Tyler	
2023	"K-POP"	Travis Scott	with Bad Bunny and The Weeknd
2023	"GOD’S COUNTRY"	Arnaud Bresson	
2023	Circus Maximus	Travis Scott	
2023	"DELRESTO (ECHOES)"	Travis Scott	
2023	"SIRENS"	Travis Scott	
2023	"MODERN JAM"	Travis Scott	
2023	"HYAENA"	Travis Scott	
2023	"TOPIA TWINS"	White Trash Tyler and Travis Scott	featuring Rob49 and 21 Savage
2023	"I KNOW ?"	Dave Meyers and Travis Scott	
2023	"Fein"	Gabriel Moses	featuring Playboi Carti
2024	"Drugs You Should Try It"	Jordan Hemingway	
2025	"4X4"	Travis Scott	
2025	"2000 EXCURSION"	CACTUS JACK	JACKBOYS and Travis Scott
2025	"DUMBO"	Travis Scott	
2025	"KICK OUT"	Travis Scott	
2025	"BEEP BEEP"	Travis Scott	with SahBabii
2025	"PBT"	Travis Scott	with Tyla and Vybz Kartel
As featured performer
2013	"I'm Leanin"		Meek Mill featuring Birdman and Diddy
2013	"Yes Lord"		Audio Push featuring King Chip
2013	"Blocka"		Pusha T featuring Poplin
2015	"White Girls"		Belly
2015	"No Sense"	Parris Goebel	Justin Bieber
2015	"Workin"		Diddy featuring Big Sean
2016	"Whole Lotta Lovin'"		DJ Mustard
2016	"waves"		Miguel
2016	"Bake Sale"		Wiz Khalifa
2016	"Money Go"		Belly
2016	"Night Riders"		Major Lazer featuring 2 Chainz, Pusha T and Mad Cobra
2016	"Uber Everywhere"		MadeinTYO
2016	"No English"		Juicy J
2016	"Last Time"		Gucci Mane
2017	"Love Galore"	Nabil	SZA
2017	"On Everything"	Eif Rivera	DJ Khaled featuring Rick Ross and Big Sean
2017	"It's Secured"		DJ Khaled featuring Nas
2017	"Know No Better"	Philip Andelman	Major Lazer featuring Camila Cabello and Quavo
2017	"Sky Walker"	Director X	Miguel
2017	Go Off		Quavo, Lil Uzi Vert
2017	"4 am"		2 Chainz
2017	"Krippy Kush"	Eif Rivera	Farruko & Bad Bunny featuring Nicki Minaj and Rvssian
2018	"Dark Knight Dummo"		Trippie Redd
2018	"Close"		Rae Sremmurd
2018	"Champion"		Nav
2018	"Neighbor"	RJ Sanchez	Juicy J
2018	"Zeze"		Kodak Black, Offset
2019	"CHopstix"		Schoolboy Q
2019	"Celebrate"		DJ Khaled, Post Malone
2019	"Mile High"		James Blake, MEtro Boomin
2019	"Power Is Power"		SZA, The Weeknd
2019	"The London"		Young Thug, J Cole
2019	"Hot (Remix)"	Christian Sutton	Young Thug, Gunna
2019	"Antisocial"		Ed Sheeran
2020	"Give No Fux"		Migos, Young Thug
2020	"Turks"	Amir "Cash" Esmailian & Zac Facts	NAv & Gunna
2020	"Wash Us in the Blood"		Kanye West
2020	"Lithuania"		Big Sean
2021	Durag Activity"	Eliel Ford	Baby Keem
2021	"Flocky Flocky"		Don Toliver
2022	"Hold That Heat"		Southside, Future
2022	"Never Sleep"	Evan Larson	Nav
2023	"Likka Sto 2"		Lil Blessin, BIA, G Herbo
2023	"Say My Grace"		Offset
2024	"Type Shit"		Future & Metro Boomin
2024	"Water (Remix)"		Tyla
2024	"Ohh Shhh"		Ice Spice
2024	"Parking Lot"		Mustard
2024	"Active"		Asake
Cameo appearances
2014	"Video Girl"	Kahlil Joseph	FKA Twigs
2015	"Monster"		Future
2015	"Five More Hours"	Andrew Sandler	Deorro and Chris Brown
2016	"Bad and Boujee"	Daps	Migos featuring Lil Uzi Vert
2017	"Reminder"		The Weeknd
2017	"LOVE."	Dave Meyers and The Little Homies	Kendrick Lamar featuring Zacari

== Television appearances ==
Television
Year	Title	Role	Notes
2013	RapFix Live	Himself	Season 4, Episode 13: "French Montana, Fat Joe"
2013	Skee Live	Himself	Season 1, Episode 2: "Featuring Action Bronson & Travis Scott"
2015	Jimmy Kimmel Live!	Himself, musical guest	Season 13, Episode 122: "Kerry Washington/Lea Michele/Travis Scott"
2015	Late Night with Seth Meyers	Himself, musical guest	Season 3, Episode 38: "Seth Rogen/Leslie Odom, Jr./Travis Scott/Emily Armstrong"
2016	Ridiculousness	Himself	Season 7, Episode 14: "Travis Scott"
2016	The Ellen DeGeneres Show	Himself, musical guest	Season 13, Episode 108: "Kaley Cuoco/Sam Forbes"
2016	The Late Late Show with James Corden	Himself, musical guest	Season 2, Episode 113: "Sharon Stone/Sebastian Stan/Zach Woods/Jamie Lawson"
2016	Wild N Out	Himself, musical guest	Season 8, Episode 4: "Travis Scott"
2016	The Late Show with Stephen Colbert	Himself, musical guest	Season 2, Episode 3: "Jessica Alba/Bradley Whitford/George Takei"
2017	Jimmy Kimmel Live!	Himself, musical guest	Season 15, Episode 8: "Anthony Anderson/Ruby Rose/Travis Scott"
2017	Ballers	Himself	Season 3, Episode 2: "Bull Rush" Season 3, Episode 8: "Alley-Oops"
2021	Trolls: Holiday in Harmony	Rhyme-a-saurus (voice)	Television film
2024	WWE Raw	Himself	1 episode
