= Stuff (Lil Baby song) =

2025 song by Lil Baby featuring Travis Scott

Song by Lil Baby featuring Travis Scott

from the album WHAM
- Released: January 3, 2025
- Length: 3:02
- Label: Quality Control; Motown
- Songwriters: Dominique Jones; Jacques Webster; Wesley Glass
- Producers: Wheezy; Juke Wong

Music video
- "Stuff" on YouTube

"Stuff" (previously titled "Free Stuff" on YouTube) is a song by American rapper Lil Baby from his fourth studio album, WHAM (2025). It was produced by Wheezy and Juke Wong. The song features vocals from American rapper Travis Scott, thus marking the fourth collaboration between the two artists, following "Highest in the Room (Remix)", "Hats Off", and "Never Sleep".

== Composition ==
"Stuff" features two verses (one each from both rappers), a chorus (performed thrice by Travis Scott), an intro, and an outro; both of which are performed by Travis Scott. The track finds Lil Baby and Travis Scott boasting about the expensive items that they have purchased and their somewhat lavish lifestyles.

== Critical reception ==
The song was received positively by fans and music critics alike. StayFreeRadio, a music review outlet, praised the song for containing multiple layers of meaning and clever wordplay; often noting that the song focused on wealth, luxury, and street credibility.

== Charts ==
Chart performance for "Stuff"
Chart (2025)	Peak position
Canada Hot 100 (Billboard)	56
Global 200 (Billboard)	102
New Zealand Hot Singles (RMNZ)	7
UK Singles (OCC)	82
US Billboard Hot 100	51
US Hot R&B/Hip-Hop Songs (Billboard)	13
