= Get Off Me =

2024 song by Kid Cudi and Travis Scott

Song by Kid Cudi and Travis Scott

from the album Insano
- Released: January 12, 2024
- Length: 3:35
- Label: Wicked Awesome; Republic
- Songwriters: Scott Mescudi; Jacques Webster II; Pavel Matev; Alexander Yossifov; Konstantin Dragnev; William Coleman; Jean-Baptiste Kouame; Mike McHenry
- Producers: Kid Cudi; Mike Zombie; Jean-Baptiste; Days of 1993

"Get Off Me" is a song by American rappers Kid Cudi and Travis Scott from the former's ninth studio album, Insano (2024). It was produced by Cudi himself, Mike Zombie, Jean-Baptiste and Days of 1993.

== Critical reception ==
The song received generally positive reviews from music critics. Robin Murray of Clash called it a "red-hot Travis Scott bolstered rap burner". Sam Moore of HipHopDX wrote, "'Get Off Me' is a perfect reminder of the chemistry Cudi and Travis Scott have when they hop on a song together even if it does not quite reach the euphoric heights of their 2020 smash hit 'The Scotts.' But it still feels fit for a rager at a festival." Neil Z. Yeung of AllMusic had a favorable reaction to the song and described it "pounding, riotous".

== Charts ==
Chart performance for "Get Off Me"
Chart (2024)	Peak position
New Zealand Hot Singles (RMNZ)	11
US Bubbling Under Hot 100 (Billboard)	3
US Hot R&B/Hip-Hop Songs (Billboard)	48
