= Pavel Matev =

Pavel Hristov Matev (Bulgarian: Павел Христов Матев; December 6, 1924 – February 4, 2006) was a Bulgarian poet.

Matev was born in the village of Orisovo, in the Stara Zagora province, (southern Bulgaria), and completed his gymnasium education in the town of Chirpan in 1938. His first work was published in 1946. He completed a course in Slavic studies in Sofia University in 1949. He was considered a major contributor to Bulgarian society. He died in Sofia.

Children's poems:

- "В строя" (1951),
- "Дълг" (1955),
- "Време, родина, любов" (1962),
- "Родословие" (1963),
- "Прозрения. Избрана лирика" (1965),
- "Чайките почиват на вълните" (1965; 1967),
- "Стихотворения" (1966),
- "100 стихотворения. Подбрани" (1970),
- "Избрани стихотворения" (1972),
- "Натрупани мълчания" (1973; 1974; 1981),
- "Строго лято. Избрана поезия" (1974),
- "Внезапни паузи" (1976; 1980),
- "Рани и слънца. Избр. стихотворения" (1978),
- "Когато птиците летят по-бавно" (1979),
- "Предсказания. Изповеди. Избр. стихотворения. В 2 тома" (1984),
- "Сърдечни затишия" (1985),
- "Ти сън ли си. Любовна лирика" (1989).
