= The Plan (Travis Scott song) =

2020 single by Travis Scott

Single by Travis Scott

from the album Tenet: Original Motion Picture Soundtrack
- Released: August 22, 2020
- Recorded: 2020
- Genre: Alternative hip-hop; trap
- Length: 3:05
- Label: Warner Records; WaterTower
- Songwriters: Jacques Webster II; Ludwig Göransson; Ebony Oshunrinde
- Producers: Göransson; WondaGurl

Travis Scott singles chronology
"Wash Us in the Blood" (2020)	"The Plan" (2020)	"Franchise" (2020)

Visualizer
- "The Plan" on YouTube

"The Plan" (officially titled "The Plan (From the Motion Picture "TENET")") is a song by American rapper Travis Scott. It was released on August 22, 2020, as the theme song from the soundtrack to the film Tenet. The film's writer and director Christopher Nolan described the track as "the final piece of a yearlong puzzle". It is Scott's first original song written for a film.

== Background ==
The song was announced by Scott via his social media on August 18, 2020, along with the cover art. The announcement coincided with the sixth anniversary of his breakout mixtape Days Before Rodeo. A snippet of the track was played during an NBA on TNT trailer, in which Scott stated: "This is my first original song for a film, which is actually fire 'cause I kinda wouldn't want it any other way". It premiered during the 2020 NBA Clippers/Mavericks playoffs game and was released at 12 AM Eastern US Time on August 22.

"The way that he connects with art is not in a singular form. He has so many tentacles, and they're all electric. So when we talk about feeling, [whether that's] listening to a song or talking about a movie, he can visualize things in so many different fields. So it's a very special ability. It's like his own magic power".

— "The Plan" producer Ludwig Göransson speaking to Deadline on working with Scott.

The song was recorded with producer Ludwig Göransson, who composed the soundtrack and score for Tenet at all the individual artists' homes during the COVID-19 lockdown. The song was produced by Göransson, along with Canadian producer WondaGurl. Scott watched Tenet prior to its release and said in his cover story interview for the September issue of GQ magazine he could not explain the film, calling it "very fire". During that interview, which took place in early July 2020, he accidentally played "The Plan" for the magazine's writer Gerrick D. Kennedy, who labeled the song a "brain-liquefying trip through time and space". The film's writer/producer/director Christopher Nolan said Scott's contribution to the long delayed film was "the final piece of a yearlong puzzle". Nolan praised Scott's vision:

"His insights into the musical and narrative mechanism [composer] Ludwig Göransson and I were building were immediate, insightful, and profound".

== Cover art ==
The cover art consists of a "moody" image of Tenet's lead actor John David Washington, floating in red space with the title of the film and the song inscribed in the right corner.

== Charts ==
Chart (2020)	Peak position
Canada Hot 100 (Billboard)	62
Portugal (AFP)	78
Sweden Heatseeker (Sverigetopplistan)	3
Switzerland (Schweizer Hitparade)	98
UK Singles (Official Charts)	93
US Billboard Hot 100	74
US Hot R&B/Hip-Hop Songs (Billboard)	28
US Rolling Stone Top 100	43
