= Niagara Falls (Foot or 2) =

2022 song by Metro Boomin, Travis Scott and 21 Savage

Song by Metro Boomin, Travis Scott and 21 Savage

from the album Heroes & Villains
- Released: December 2, 2022
- Genre: Trap
- Length: 3:19
- Label: Boominati; Republic
- Songwriters: Leland Wayne; Jacques Webster; Shéyaa Abraham-Joseph; Allen Ritter; Jacob Wilkinson-Smith; Peter Lee Johnson
- Producers: Metro Boomin; Ritter; My Best Friend Jacob; Johnson (add.)

"Niagara Falls (Foot or 2)" is a song by American record producer Metro Boomin, American rapper Travis Scott, and British-American rapper 21 Savage, from Metro's second studio album Heroes & Villains (2022). It was written by the artists alongside Allen Ritter, My Best Friend Jacob, and Peter Lee Johnson, the latter three producing it with Metro.

== Background ==
Cactus Jack Records' Chase B and Travis Scott first previewed the song on their podcast .WAV Radio in October 2020. The song leaked in January 2021 on Spotify, but was soon removed from the platform. On November 30, 2022, Metro Boomin revealed on Twitter that the song would be on his album Heroes & Villains, which was then released a few days later.

== Composition ==
The song features a trap beat with a "chilling" piano loop.

== Critical reception ==
The song received generally positive reviews from critics. Robin Murray of Clash wrote, "'Niagara Falls (Foot Or 2)' is a real highlight – it's never less than entertaining." Mosi Reeves commented on 21 Savage's line "Mike Vick, number 7, I'm a dog", calling it a "funny" reference to the Bad Newz Kennels dog fighting investigation. Hamza Riaz regarded the song as one of the best tracks from Heroes & Villains.

== Charts ==
=== Weekly charts ===
Weekly chart performance for "Niagara Falls (Foot or 2)"
Chart (2022)	Peak position
Australia (ARIA)	43
Canada Hot 100 (Billboard)	8
France (SNEP)	154
Global 200 (Billboard)	21
Greece (Billboard)	10
Iceland (Billboard)	19
Ireland (IRMA)	32
Luxembourg (Billboard)	25
Netherlands (Single Top 100)	74
New Zealand (Recorded Music NZ)	37
Portugal (Billboard)	15
Romania (Billboard)	14
South Africa (Billboard)	17
Switzerland (Schweizer Hitparade)	28
UK Singles (OCC)	46
US Billboard Hot 100	27
US Hot R&B/Hip-Hop Songs (Billboard)	8

=== Year-end charts ===
Year-end chart performance for "Niagara Falls (Foot or 2)"
Chart (2023)	Position
US Hot R&B/Hip-Hop Songs (Billboard)	72

== Certifications ==
Certifications for "Niagara Falls (Foot or 2)"
Region	Certification	Certified units/sales
Australia (ARIA)	Platinum	70,000^{‡}
Canada (Music Canada)	Platinum	80,000^{‡}
New Zealand (RMNZ)	Platinum	30,000^{‡}
Poland (ZPAV)	Gold	25,000^{‡}
United Kingdom (BPI)	Silver	200,000^{‡}
Streaming
Greece (IFPI Greece)	Gold	1,000,000^{†}
^{‡} Sales+streaming figures based on certification alone.^{†} Streaming-only figures based on certification alone.
