= Solitaires =

2020 song by Future featuring Travis Scott

Song by Future featuring Travis Scott

from the album High Off Life
- Released: May 15, 2020
- Genre: Trap
- Length: 3:25
- Label: Freebandz; Epic
- Songwriters: Nayvadius Wilburn; Jacques Webster II; Amir Esmailian; Wesley Glass
- Producer: Wheezy

"Solitaires" is a song by American rapper Future featuring American rapper Travis Scott, from the former's eighth studio album High Off Life (2020). It was written by the artists alongside Amir Esmailian and Wheezy, the producer of the song. It is Future's third collaboration with Travis Scott, following 2015's "3500" and 2019's "First Off".

== Composition ==
The song finds the rappers detailing their wealthy lifestyles, including flashy diamonds, and living happy lives even as the COVID-19 pandemic is raging, in Auto-Tuned vocals over a trap beat. Future also jokes about needing a psychiatrist.

== Critical reception ==
The song received generally positive reviews. Neil Z. Yeung of AllMusic wrote, "Of the immediate highlights, his Travis Scott collaboration 'Solitaires' is the album's champion, a flawless blend of their complimentary [sic] vocal styles and top-notch production by Wheezy that combines bass booms with haunting atmospherics similar to Scott's "Sicko Mode" and "Highest in the Room." Luke Morgan Britton of NME called it "a particular highlight, otherworldly and dizzying", adding, "The song lives up to the album's billing as a cathartic distraction from the real world's ills, as both artists manage to fit quarantine bars into a club-ready banger." HipHopDX's Dana Scott wrote a mixed response to the song, commenting that Travis Scott is "effective" while writing, "But they latch onto the new eye-rolling cliché metaphor of late among rappers about the coronavirus for the hook."

== Charts ==
Chart (2020)	Peak position
Canada Hot 100 (Billboard)	46
France (SNEP)	155
Ireland (IRMA)	62
New Zealand Hot Singles (RMNZ)	5
Portugal (AFP)	106
Switzerland (Schweizer Hitparade)	51
UK Singles (Official Charts)	59
US Billboard Hot 100	32
US Hot R&B/Hip-Hop Songs (Billboard)	15

== Certifications ==
Region	Certification	Certified units/sales
Canada (Music Canada)	Platinum	80,000^{‡}
United States (RIAA)	Platinum	1,000,000^{‡}
^{‡} Sales+streaming figures based on certification alone.
