= Ice Age (Don Toliver song) =

2024 song by Don Toliver featuring Travis Scott

Song by Don Toliver featuring Travis Scott

from the album Hardstone Psycho
- Released: June 14, 2024
- Length: 3:37
- Label: Cactus Jack; Atlantic
- Songwriters: Caleb Toliver; Jacques Webster II; Mikey Freedom Hart; Cashmere Small
- Producers: Hart; Cash Cobain; Bnyx; 206Derek

"Ice Age" is a song by the American rapper Don Toliver featuring Travis Scott fromToliver's fourth studio album, Hardstone Psycho (2024). It was produced by Mikey Freedom Hart and Cash Cobain, with additional production from Bnyx and 206Derek.

== Composition ==
The song finds Don Toliver and Travis Scott melodically rapping. Scott begins the song, while Toliver's performance happens halfway through the song.

== Critical reception ==
Gabriel Bras Nevares of HotNewHipHop regarded Travis Scott's guest appearance as "more meager" compared to his other feature on Hardstone Psycho, "Inside". Alexander Cole of HotNewHipHop gave a positive review, stating "the chemistry between these two artists is palpable, and we get a fantastic song that helps further the journey this album takes us on."

== Charts ==
Chart performance for "Ice Age"
Chart (2024)	Peak position
New Zealand Hot Singles (RMNZ)	16
US Billboard Hot 100	92
US Hot R&B/Hip-Hop Songs (Billboard)	28
