= Wake Up F1lthy =

2025 song by Playboi Carti and Travis Scott

Song by Playboi Carti and Travis Scott

from the album Music
- Released: March 14, 2025
- Length: 2:49
- Label: AWGE; Interscope
- Songwriters: Jordan Carter; Jacques Webster; Richard Ortiz; Benjamin Saint-Fort; Jacek Popiolek
- Producers: F1lthy; Bnyx; Wonder1x

"Wake Up F1lthy" (stylized in all caps, also known simply as "Wake Up") is a song by American rappers Playboi Carti and Travis Scott. It was released through AWGE and Interscope Records as the seventeenth track from Carti's third studio album, Music, on March 14, 2025. The song was written by Playboi Carti and Travis Scott, alongside producers F1lthy and Bnyx.

== Composition ==
The song includes pop-punk aspects that reflect the style of Playboi Carti's album Die Lit (2018). The lyrics find the rappers detailing their sexual encounters.

== Critical reception ==
Billboard placed the song at number 16 in their ranking of the songs from Music and in eighth place on their list of the album's best guest features. Mackenzie Cummings-Grady wrote, "Again, the chemistry between these two is just undeniable. Travis comes through and does his thing with his smooth Auto-Tuned flow perfectly complimenting Carti's twisting voice. But the song is far too short, and ends just as the vibe begins to settle in. One more verse from each rapper would have moved this up the ranking a little bit more." In a review of the album, Mosi Reeves of Rolling Stone cited it as among the songs that "falter from mundanity".

== Personnel ==
Credits and personnel adapted from Tidal.

Musicians

- Jordan Carter – vocals
- Jacques Webster – vocals
- Richard Ortiz – production
- Benjamin Fort – production

Technical

- Ojivolta – mastering
- Marcus Fritz – mixing, recording
- Roark Bailey – recording

== Charts ==
Chart performance for "Wake Up F1lthy"
Chart (2025)	Peak position
Australia (ARIA)	87
Australia Hip Hop/R&B (ARIA)	25
Canada Hot 100 (Billboard)	55
Global 200 (Billboard)	51
Lithuania (AGATA)	40
UK Audio Streaming (OCC)	88
US Billboard Hot 100	52
US Hot R&B/Hip-Hop Songs (Billboard)	25
