= Philly (Playboi Carti and Travis Scott song) =

Song by Playboi Carti and Travis Scott

from the album Music
- Released: March 14, 2025
- Recorded: 2024
- Genre: Trap; Alternative hip-hop
- Length: 3:05
- Label: AWGE; Interscope
- Songwriters: Jordan Carter; Jacques Webster II; Ronald LaTour, Jr.; Jason Pounds
- Producers: Cardo; Johnny Juliano

Audio video
- "Philly" on YouTube

"Philly" (stylized in all caps) is a song by American rappers Playboi Carti and Travis Scott. It was released through AWGE and Interscope Records as the sixth track from Carti's third studio album, Music, on March 14, 2025. The song was written by Playboi Carti, Travis Scott and Jason "J. LBS" Pounds, alongside producer Cardo, who produced it with Johnny Juliano. It samples "Carter Son" by YoungBoy Never Broke Again.

== Critical reception ==
In a ranking of all features on the album, Billboard's Mackenzie Cummings-Grady placed "Philly" third and described the song to be "smooth as ice", opining that Carti and Scott "have a winning formula, and out of all their songs together on MUSIC, 'Philly's' groove packs the most serious punch". Angel Diaz and Michael Saponara later also ranked the song 25th of the overall album, opining that the song "this joint sounds like the score from Desperado (1995); the music video needs Travis and Carti to hop out the Hellcat with the yopper in the guitar case like Antonio Banderas", adding that "you also have Travis starting the song off by singing, 'Brand new ass, brand new nose,' and it's so damn funny for some reason" and "Carti, on the other hand, has his Batman voicebox manipulator going, as he ends his verse like a villain".

== Personnel ==
Credits and personnel adapted from Tidal.

Musicians

- Jordan Carter – vocals
- Jacques Webster – vocals
- Ronald LaTour, Jr. – production
- Jason Pounds – production

Technical

- Ojivolta – mastering
- Marcus Fritz – mixing, recording

== Charts ==
Chart performance for "Philly"
| Chart (2025) | Peak position |
|---|---|
| Australia (ARIA) | 49 |
| Australia Hip Hop/R&B (ARIA) | 13 |
| Canada Hot 100 (Billboard) | 32 |
| Czech Republic Singles Digital (ČNS IFPI) | 19 |
| France (SNEP) | 125 |
| Global 200 (Billboard) | 24 |
| Greece International (IFPI) | 12 |
| Hungary (Single Top 40) | 38 |
| Italy (FIMI) | 92 |
| Latvia (LaIPA) | 7 |
| Lithuania (AGATA) | 14 |
| New Zealand (Recorded Music NZ) | 35 |
| Romania (Billboard) | 20 |
| Slovakia Singles Digital (ČNS IFPI) | 10 |
| Sweden Heatseeker (Sverigetopplistan) | 5 |
| UK Streaming (OCC) | 64 |
| US Billboard Hot 100 | 28 |
| US Hot R&B/Hip-Hop Songs (Billboard) | 14 |
