= Top Floor =

2020 song by Gunna featuring Travis Scott

Song by Gunna featuring Travis Scott

from the album Wunna
- Released: May 22, 2020
- Length: 2:49
- Label: YSL; 300
- Songwriters: Sergio Kitchens; Jacques Webster II; Chandler Durham; Wesley Glass
- Producers: Turbo; Wheezy

"Top Floor" is a song by American rapper Gunna featuring fellow American rapper Travis Scott, from the former's second studio album Wunna (2020). It was written alongside producers Turbo and Wheezy.

== Composition ==
The song contains horns in the production in a similar style to marching band fanfares, as well as Auto-Tuned chants from Travis Scott.

== Critical reception ==
Mimi Kenny of HipHopDX called it "perfect for those who want a sequel to So Much Fun standout 'Hot.'" Alphonse Pierre of Pitchfork criticized Travis Scott's feature, describing that it seems like "nothing more than formalities to juice streaming numbers". In contrast, Hamza Riaz of Mic Cheque deemed the song a standout from Wunna and wrote, "It's finally a Travis Scott feature that doesn't sound phoned-in."

== Charts ==
Chart (2020)	Peak position
Canada Hot 100 (Billboard)	73
France (SNEP)	185
New Zealand Hot Singles (RMNZ)	4
Portugal (AFP)	200
Switzerland (Schweizer Hitparade)	78
UK Singles (OCC)	90
US Billboard Hot 100	55
US Hot R&B/Hip-Hop Songs (Billboard)	22

== Certifications ==
Region	Certification	Certified units/sales
Canada (Music Canada)	Gold	40,000^{‡}
^{‡} Sales+streaming figures based on certification alone.
