= Tenet (soundtrack) =

2020 soundtrack album by Ludwig Göransson

Tenet (Original Motion Picture Soundtrack)

Soundtrack album by Ludwig Göransson
- Released: September 2, 2020
- Genre: Film score
- Length: 86:30
- Label: WaterTower Music
- Producers: Christopher Nolan; Ludwig Göransson

Ludwig Göransson chronology
The Mandalorian: Chapter 8 (Original Score) (2019)	Tenet (Original Motion Picture Soundtrack) (2020)	The Mandalorian: Season 2 - Vol. 1 (Chapters 9-12) (Original Score) (2020)

Tenet (Original Motion Picture Soundtrack) is the soundtrack album to the 2020 film of the same name written and directed by Christopher Nolan, released under WaterTower Music on September 2, 2020. Ludwig Göransson created and composed the score for the film, marking his first collaboration with Nolan. Nolan had originally wanted frequent collaborator Hans Zimmer to compose the score but Zimmer had to decline due to his commitments to Dune, which was also produced by Warner Bros. Pictures. On February 3, 2021, the score was nominated for Golden Globe Award for Best Original Score for the 78th Golden Globe Awards. The soundtrack also contains the song "The Plan" by American rapper Travis Scott, which was produced by Göransson and WondaGurl.

== Background ==
Ludwig Göransson composed the score after Nolan's frequent collaborator Hans Zimmer had committed himself to the 2021 film Dune, which Zimmer wanted to do since the 1980s. During the COVID-19 pandemic, Göransson recorded musicians at their homes. It was the first film directed by Nolan since The Prestige in 2006 to not be composed by Hans Zimmer. It was also the first film directed by Nolan to not be composed by Zimmer or David Julyan.

== Composition ==
During an interview in a podcast with Kenny Holmes and Robert Kraft, Göransson stated in early August 2020 that he finished creating the score weeks before August, and praised Nolan for choosing him, stating; "I finished my part, working on it a couple of weeks ago. I feel so fortunate in my career to work with like these geniuses and I feel like that's why it feels so easy for me". When asked if Nolan came over to his studio and told him how he wanted "things to sound", Göransson said; "Absolutely. He can talk so much about music, you know". Göransson also stated he began working on Tenet's score three or four months before filming even commenced.

Travis Scott's involvement in the soundtrack was a last-minute decision when director Christopher Nolan told Göransson he decided to add an end title track to the credit. According to Göransson, Travis Scott was sent the track "Trucks in Place" and "The Plan" was written from the beat of the former after having heard the track. Göransson added that a snippet of Scott's voice from "The Plan" was placed on top of The Protagonist's theme, which is audible in several tracks within the score, with him stating; "It ["The Plan"] was actually so good that me & Chris, we took a snippet of Travis' voice and placed it out on top of The Protagonist's theme throughout the movie. And that was kind of the last, missing piece of the puzzle that we just did."

== Track listing ==
All tracks are written by Ludwig Göransson, with track 18 containing additional writing by Travis Scott and WondaGurl.

No.	Title	Length
1.	"Rainy Night in Tallinn"	8:01
2.	"Windmills"	5:16
3.	"Meeting Neil"	2:16
4.	"Priya"	3:24
5.	"Betrayal"	3:56
6.	"Freeport"	3:39
7.	"747"	7:05
8.	"From Mumbai to Amalfi"	4:26
9.	"Foils"	3:11
10.	"Sator"	2:51
11.	"Trucks in Place"	5:32
12.	"Red Room Blue Room"	3:29
13.	"Inversion"	3:32
14.	"Retrieving the Case"	3:20
15.	"The Algorithm"	5:58
16.	"Posterity"	12:42
17.	"The Protagonist"	4:48
18.	"The Plan" (performed by Travis Scott)	3:05
Total length:		86:30

Bonus tracks
No.	Title	Length
19.	"Fast Cars"	3:35
20.	"Turnstile"	6:15
Total length:		96:20

Notes

- All track titles are stylized in all caps.

== Charts ==
Chart (2020–2021)	Peak position
UK Soundtrack Albums (OCC)	4
US Soundtrack Albums (Billboard)	19

== Accolades ==
In January 2021, Göransson's work on Tenet won the award for "Best Original Score in a Sci-Fi/Fantasy Film" at the 11th Hollywood Music in Media Awards.
