= Raindrops (Insane) =

2022 song by Metro Boomin and Travis Scott

Song by Metro Boomin and Travis Scott

from the album Heroes & Villains
- Released: December 2, 2022
- Genre: Cloud rap
- Length: 3:08
- Label: Boominati; Republic
- Songwriters: Leland Wayne; Jacques Webster; David Ruoff; Elias Klughammer; Landon Wayne
- Producers: Metro Boomin; Honorable C.N.O.T.E.; David x Eli; Scriptplugg; Allen Ritter (add.)

"Raindrops (Insane)" is a song by American record producer Metro Boomin and American rapper Travis Scott from the former's second studio album Heroes & Villains (2022). It was produced by Metro, Honorable C.N.O.T.E., Allen Ritter, David x Eli and Scriptplugg.

== Composition ==
Robert Blair of HotNewHipHop described, "For Travis Scott, 'Raindrops' invokes the psychedelically-subdued cloud-rap sound of his Rodeo days". Scott mentions getting pleasure from taking drugs which relieve his pain ("Pill pop the pain, this purple rain").

== Critical reception ==
The song received generally mixed reviews from critics. Robin Murray of Clash had a favorable reaction to the song, writing, "Travis Scott revs up 'Raindrops' adding an almost punk-like energy to the song". In a review of Heroes & Villains, Peter A. Berry of Complex considered it among the songs which although "can suffer from lyrical blandness, their melodies make them compelling anyways." Brady Brickner-Wood of Pitchfork gave a negative review, writing "Travis Scott sounds half-asleep on the unimaginative 'Raindrops (Insane)'".

== Charts ==
Chart performance for "Raindrops (Insane)"
Chart (2022)	Peak position
Australia (ARIA)	67
Canada Hot 100 (Billboard)	15
France (SNEP)	123
Global 200 (Billboard)	30
Portugal (AFP)	33
South Africa (Billboard)	22
US Billboard Hot 100	31
US Hot R&B/Hip-Hop Songs (Billboard)	10

== Certifications ==
Certifications for "Raindrops (Insane)"
Region	Certification	Certified units/sales
Canada (Music Canada)	Gold	40,000^{‡}
^{‡} Sales+streaming figures based on certification alone.
