= Heroes & Villains =

Studio album by Metro Boomin
- Released: December 2, 2022
- Recorded: 2021–2022
- Studios: Boominati (Los Angeles); Five Star; RedZone (Atlanta); SugarHill (Houston)
- Genre: Psychedelic trap
- Length: 48:07
- Labels: Boominati; Republic
- Producers: Metro Boomin; D. Rich; DaHeala; David x Eli; DJ Moon; Elkan; Honorable C.N.O.T.E.; Johan Lenox; My Best Friend Jacob; Nik D; Oz; Peter Lee Johnson; Prince85; Scriptplugg; Simon on the Moon; TM88; Xz

Metro Boomin chronology
Savage Mode II (2020)	Heroes & Villains (2022)	Metro Boomin Presents Spider-Man: Across the Spider-Verse (Soundtrack from and Inspired by the Motion Picture) (2023)

Singles from Heroes & Villains
- 1. "Creepin'" Released: January 27, 2023

Heroes Version

Villains Version

Heroes & Villains (stylized in all caps) is the second solo studio album by American record producer Metro Boomin. It was released through Republic Records and Boominati on December 2, 2022. The album contains guest appearances from John Legend, Future, Chris Brown, Don Toliver, Travis Scott, 21 Savage, Young Nudy, Young Thug, the Weeknd, Mustafa, ASAP Rocky, the late Takeoff and Gunna. Production was mainly handled by Metro himself, alongside TM88, DJ Moon, Peter Lee Johnson, Johan Lenox, Allen Ritter, David x Eli, Honorable C.N.O.T.E., Scriptplugg, Prince85, Oz, Nik D, D. Rich, DaHeala, My Best Friend Jacob, Elkan, Simon on the Moon, and Xz.

A psychedelic trap album, ASAP Rocky and Morgan Freeman, the latter of whom previously narrated Metro's Savage Mode II with 21 Savage, serve as its narrators. The album serves as the sequel to Metro's previous album, Not All Heroes Wear Capes (2018), and serves as the second project for a trilogy. The album's cover resembles that of English rock band Pink Floyd's 1975 album Wish You Were Here. An instrumental version of the album, titled the "Heroes Version", was released on December 5, 2022. A chopped not slopped remix edition of the album by OG Ron C and DJ Candlestick, titled the "Villains Version", was released on February 17, 2023. Heroes & Villains debuted at the top of the US Billboard 200, with 185,000 album-equivalent units sold in its first week of release, making it Metro's third number-one album.

== Release and promotion ==
On November 17, 2021, Metro revealed the title of the album through a letter written with DJ Holiday for the three-year-anniversary of Not All Heroes Wear Capes, which was fifteen days before. On September 16, 2022, his 29th birthday, he took to social media to announce the album along with a trailer video, sharing that the album was dedicated to his late mother. At the time, the album was originally scheduled to be released on November 4. However, on October 26, Metro announced it would be pushed back by four weeks due to sample clearance issues. Fan speculation initially arose that it was due to the fact that his previous collaborators, Drake and 21 Savage, released their collaborative studio album, Her Loss, the same day that Metro originally was supposed to release the album; this was later proven untrue. On November 22, Metro shared the album's cover art and stated that it would have two sides: the "Hero" side and the "Villain" side. The cover art is inspired by Pink Floyd's ninth studio album, Wish You Were Here (1975). Exactly a week later, Metro shared a short film for the album that was directed by Gibson Hazard and stars himself alongside Young Thug, Gunna, Morgan Freeman, and Lakeith Stanfield. Eight days later, he shared songs from the tracklist one by one on his official website, in which fans would go to the website and tweet the name tracks they found on it and the names of the other artists on it. The next day, which was the day before its release, Metro used a comic book theme, in which he revealed the guest artists one by one and teased some of the lyrics used in the respective songs that feature them. He shared the full tracklist to reveal the answers to the website. The lead single of the album, "Creepin'", a collaboration with Canadian singer the Weeknd and 21 Savage, was sent to Italian contemporary hit radio on January 27, 2023.

== Critical reception ==
Professional ratings
Aggregate scores
Source	Rating
Metacritic	73/100
Review scores
Source	Rating
AllMusic	3.5/5 stars
Clash	7/10
Mic Cheque	7/10
Pitchfork	7.2/10
Slant Magazine	3.5/5 stars

According to the review aggregator Metacritic, Heroes & Villains received "generally favorable reviews" based on a weighted average score of 73 out of 100 from five critic scores.

Robin Murray of Clash wrote, "Indeed, one faultline on the record is that there is simply too much going on. 'HEROES & VILLAINS' bursts with ideas, not all of which land. A record that revels in contradictions, it grasps towards the light while framing itself in darkness." He also summarized, "A bold artist statement from Metro Boomin, 'HEROES & VILLAINS' progresses his arena-level sonic tapestry, while also leaving space to grow. A statement of intent, he utilises one of the finest contact books in American hip-hop to build his rogue's gallery." Writing for Mic Cheque, Hamza R. felt that "it means one must treat Heroes & Villains like a holistic experience, driven by its tight theme, and Metro's muted but irresistible sound that keeps the album's engine running" and "he remains a conductor, waving his wand to summon a trap album that may not be his personal best but is robust enough to upstage most albums of its kind this year". Brady Brickner-Wood of Pitchfork described the album as "an ambitious, detail-rich record that splits the difference between streaming fodder and world-building", adding that "proves that Metro aspires to more than hits". Charles Lyons-Burt of Slant Magazine summarized that the album is "not very ambitious as far as subject matter goes, but the majority of the guests, whose appearances never feel obligatory, at least cursorily touch on the central theme".

== Commercial performance ==
In the United States, Heroes & Villains debuted at number one on the US Billboard 200 with 185,000 album-equivalent units, which included 5,000 pure album sales in its first week, making it his third number-one album in the country. In its second week, the album remained in the top ten and fell to number three, earning 102,000 album-equivalent units. On June 5, 2023, the album was certified platinum by the Recording Industry Association of America (RIAA) for combined sales and album-equivalent units of over a million units in the United States. As of December 27, 2023, Heroes & Villains was the ninth best-selling album of the year according to Hits, moved a total 1,472,000 album-equivalent units, including 51,000 pure album sales, 77,000 song sales, 1.893 billion audio-on-demand streams, and 56 million video-on-demand streams.

== Track listing ==
Heroes & Villains track listing
No.	Title	Writer(s)	Producer(s)	Length
1.	"On Time" (with John Legend)	Leland Wayne; John Stephens; Bryan Simmons; Corey Moon; Peter Lee Johnson; Johan Lenox; Jocelyn Donald	Metro Boomin; TM88; DJ Moon; Johnson; Lenox^{[a]}	2:49
2.	"Superhero (Heroes & Villains)" (with Future and Chris Brown)	Leland Wayne; Nayvadius Wilburn; Christopher Brown; Kanye West; Shawn Carter; Terrence Thornton; Cydel Young; Kasseem Dean; Robert Diggs; Ernest Wilson; Michael Dean; Manfred Mann; Allen Ritter; David Ruoff; Elias Klughammer	Metro Boomin; Ritter^{[c]}; David x Eli^{[c]}	3:03
3.	"Too Many Nights" (with Future featuring Don Toliver)	Leland Wayne; Wilburn; Caleb Toliver; Carlton Mays, Jr.; Ritter	Metro Boomin; Honorable C.N.O.T.E.; Ritter^{[a]}	3:19
4.	"Raindrops (Insane)" (with Travis Scott)	Leland Wayne; Jacques Webster II; Ruoff; Klughammer; Landon Wayne	Metro Boomin; David x Eli; Scriptplugg; Ritter^{[a]}	3:08
5.	"Umbrella" (with 21 Savage and Young Nudy)	Leland Wayne; Sheyaa Abraham-Joseph; Quantavious Thomas; Celso Valli; Johnson; Ruoff; Klughammer	Metro Boomin; David x Eli	3:42
6.	"Trance" (with Travis Scott and Young Thug)	Leland Wayne; Webster; Jeffery Williams; Ritter; Johnson	Metro Boomin; Ritter	3:14
7.	"Around Me" (featuring Don Toliver)	Leland Wayne; Toliver; Simon Park; Mejdi Rhars	Metro Boomin; Prince85	3:12
8.	"Metro Spider" (with Young Thug)	Leland Wayne; Williams; Ritter; Ozan Yildirim; Nik Frascona; Paul Agyei; Derek Kastal; Marcus Rucker	Metro Boomin; Ritter; Oz; Nik D; Elkan	2:55
9.	"I Can't Save You (Interlude)" (with Future featuring Don Toliver)	Leland Wayne; Wilburn; Toliver; Ritter; Dwayne Richardson	Metro Boomin; Ritter; D. Rich	1:31
10.	"Creepin'" (with the Weeknd and 21 Savage)	Leland Wayne; Abel Tesfaye; Abraham-Joseph; Jason Quenneville; Johnson; Lenox; Mario Winans; Eithne Ní Bhraonáin; Erick Sermon; Parrish Smith; Chauncey Hawkins; Michael Jones; Nicky Ryan; Roma Ryan; Nelust Jean; Prazakrel Michel; Lauryn Hill; William Hart; Thomas Bell	Metro Boomin; DaHeala; Johnson^{[a]}; Lenox^{[a]}	3:42
11.	"Niagara Falls (Foot or 2)" (with Travis Scott and 21 Savage)	Leland Wayne; Webster; Abraham-Joseph; Ritter; Jacob Wilkinson-Smith; Johnson	Metro Boomin; Ritter; My Best Friend Jacob; Johnson^{[a]}	3:27
12.	"Walk Em Down (Don't Kill Civilians)" (with 21 Savage featuring Mustafa)	Leland Wayne; Abraham-Joseph; Mustafa Ahmed; Mays; Johnson; Simon Hessman	Metro Boomin; Honorable C.N.O.T.E.; Johnson; Simon on the Moon	5:11
13.	"Lock on Me" (with Travis Scott and Future)	Leland Wayne; Webster; Wilburn; Christopher Townsend; Ritter	Metro Boomin; Xz; Ritter^{[a]}	2:55
14.	"Feel the Fiyaaaah" (with ASAP Rocky featuring Takeoff)	Leland Wayne; Rakim Mayers; Kirshnik Ball; Stephen Bruner; Robert Bryson	Metro Boomin	3:09
15.	"All the Money" (with Gunna) (bonus track)	Leland Wayne; Sergio Kitchens; Ruoff; Klughammer	Metro Boomin; David x Eli	2:47
Total length:				48:07

Notes

- ^{^[a]} signifies an additional producer
- ^{^[c]} signifies a co-producer
- "Creepin'" features additional vocals from Travis Scott.

Sample credits

- "On Time" features an excerpt from the episode "The Only Man In the Sky" from the television series The Boys, as performed by Antony Starr.
- "Superhero (Heroes & Villains)" contains samples from "So Appalled", written by Kanye West, Ernest Wilson, Mike Dean, Shawn Carter, Terrence Thornton, Cydell Young, Kaseem Dean, Robert Diggs, Manfred Mann, and performed by West, Jay-Z, Pusha T, CyHi, Swizz Beatz and RZA.
- "Umbrella" contains samples from "Rainfall", written by Celso Valli and performed by Azoto.
- "Around Me" contains samples from "Constellation", composed by Simon Park on behalf of De Wolfe Music.
- "Metro Spider" contains a use of "Dead or Alive", composed by Elkan on behalf of The Rucker Collective.
- "I Can't Save You (Interlude)" contains an interpolation from "No Advance" written by Shéyaa Bin Abraham-Joseph and Leland Wayne, performed by 21 Savage.
- "Creepin'" is a partial cover of "I Don't Wanna Know", written by Mario Winans, Eithne Ní Bhraonáin, Nicky Ryan, Roma Ryan, Lauryn Hill, Wyclef Jean, Pras Michel, William Hart, Thom Bell, Chauncey Hawkins, Erick Sermon, and Parrish Smith, and performed by Winans, P. Diddy, and Enya.
- "Walk Em Down (Don't Kill Civilians)" contains an interpolation from the 2007 documentary Hood Affairs, starring Gucci Mane.
- "Feel the Fiyaaaah" contains samples from "Feel the Fire", written and performed by Peabo Bryson.

== Personnel ==
Musicians

- Metro Boomin – programming
- ASAP Rocky – additional vocals (tracks 1, 9)
- Morgan Freeman – additional vocals (1, 7, 11)
- Johan Lenox – strings (composition & arrangement) (1, 10), background vocals (1), keyboards (10)
- Marza Wilks – cello (1, 10)
- Kevin Lemons and Higher Calling – choir (1)
- Siraaj Rhett – trumpet, baritone horn, trombone, and French horn (1, 2)
- Peter Lee Johnson – strings (1, 10, 12), piano (5), violin (6), synthesizer (10), bass (12)
- Camille Miller – violin (1, 10)
- Yasmeen Al-Mazeedi – violin (1, 10)
- Delaram – background vocals (2)
- Mario Winans – background vocals (10)
- Travis Scott – background vocals (10)
- DaHeala – keyboards, programming (10)
- Simon Hessman – guitar (12)
- Thundercat – bass (14)

Technical

- Joe LaPorta – mastering
- Metro Boomin – mixing
- Ethan Stevens – mixing (all tracks), engineering (1, 2, 5–7, 9, 11–15)
- Patrizio "Teezio" Pigliapoco – engineering (2)
- Derek "206derek" Anderson – engineering (3, 4, 7, 9)
- Vern Emmanuel – engineering (5)
- Flo Ongonga – engineering (6, 15)
- Bainz – engineering (8)
- Kourosh Poursalehi – engineering (9)
- Isaiah "ibmixing" Brown – engineering (10)
- Shin Kamiyama – engineering (10)
- Eric Manco – engineering (13)
- Hector Delgado – engineering (14)
- Braden Davies – mixing assistance
- Zachary Acosta – mixing assistance
- Rebekka Zeyfiyan – engineering assistance (7, 9)
- Ryan Youngblood – engineering assistance (11)

== Charts ==
=== Weekly charts ===
Weekly chart performance for Heroes & Villains
Chart (2022–2024)	Peak position
Australian Albums (ARIA)	5
Austrian Albums (Ö3 Austria)	3
Belgian Albums (Ultratop Flanders)	4
Belgian Albums (Ultratop Wallonia)	11
Canadian Albums (Billboard)	1
Czech Albums (ČNS IFPI)	3
Danish Albums (Hitlisten)	1
Dutch Albums (Album Top 100)	2
Finnish Albums (Suomen virallinen lista)	3
French Albums (SNEP)	20
German Albums (Offizielle Top 100)	11
Hungarian Albums (MAHASZ)	18
Irish Albums (Official Charts)	3
Italian Albums (FIMI)	10
Latvian Albums (LaIPA)	1
Lithuanian Albums (AGATA)	1
New Zealand Albums (RMNZ)	1
Nigerian Albums (TurnTable)	13
Norwegian Albums (VG-lista)	1
Polish Albums (ZPAV)	16
Slovak Albums (ČNS IFPI)	1
Spanish Albums (Promusicae)	28
Swedish Albums (Sverigetopplistan)	2
Swiss Albums (Schweizer Hitparade)	1
UK Albums (Official Charts)	3
UK R&B Albums (Official Charts)	11
US Billboard 200	1
US Top R&B/Hip-Hop Albums (Billboard)	1

=== Year-end charts ===
2023 year-end chart performance for Heroes & Villains
Chart (2023)	Position
Australian Albums (ARIA)	22
Austrian Albums (Ö3 Austria)	7
Belgian Albums (Ultratop Flanders)	33
Belgian Albums (Ultratop Wallonia)	43
Canadian Albums (Billboard)	6
Danish Albums (Hitlisten)	9
Dutch Albums (Album Top 100)	5
French Albums (SNEP)	55
German Albums (Offizielle Top 100)	22
Hungarian Albums (MAHASZ)	30
Icelandic Albums (Tónlistinn)	3
Italian Albums (FIMI)	41
New Zealand Albums (RMNZ)	9
Polish Albums (ZPAV)	42
Swedish Albums (Sverigetopplistan)	23
Swiss Albums (Schweizer Hitparade)	5
UK Albums (OCC)	41
US Billboard 200	6
US Top R&B/Hip-Hop Albums (Billboard)	3

2024 year-end chart performance of Heroes & Villains
Chart (2024)	Position
Australian Albums (ARIA)	45
Australian Hip Hop/R&B Albums (ARIA)	9
Austrian Albums (Ö3 Austria)	23
Belgian Albums (Ultratop Flanders)	55
Belgian Albums (Ultratop Wallonia)	82
Canadian Albums (Billboard)	28
Danish Albums (Hitlisten)	72
Dutch Albums (Album Top 100)	48
French Albums (SNEP)	127
German Albums (Offizielle Top 100)	34
Hungarian Albums (MAHASZ)	35
Icelandic Albums (Tónlistinn)	31
New Zealand Albums (RMNZ)	22
Polish Albums (ZPAV)	82
Swiss Albums (Schweizer Hitparade)	12
US Billboard 200	48
US Top R&B/Hip-Hop Albums (Billboard)	15

2025 year-end chart performance of Heroes & Villains
Chart (2025)	Position
Belgian Albums (Ultratop Flanders)	118
Belgian Albums (Ultratop Wallonia)	193
Hungarian Albums (MAHASZ)	64
Swiss Albums (Schweizer Hitparade)	32
US Billboard 200	124
US Top R&B/Hip-Hop Albums (Billboard)	44

== Certifications ==
Certifications for Heroes & Villains
Region	Certification	Certified units/sales
Australia (ARIA)	Platinum	70,000^{‡}
Brazil (Pro-Música Brasil) (Villains Version)	2× Platinum	80,000^{‡}
Canada (Music Canada)	Platinum	80,000^{‡}
Denmark (IFPI Danmark)	2× Platinum	40,000^{‡}
France (SNEP)	Platinum	100,000^{‡}
Germany (BVMI)	Gold	100,000^{‡}
Italy (FIMI)	Platinum	50,000^{‡}
New Zealand (RMNZ)	2× Platinum	30,000^{‡}
Poland (ZPAV)	2× Platinum	40,000^{‡}
Portugal (AFP)	Gold	3,500^{‡}
United Kingdom (BPI)	Platinum	300,000^{‡}
United States (RIAA)	Platinum	1,000,000^{‡}
^{‡} Sales+streaming figures based on certification alone.
