= Hats Off (song) =

2021 song by Lil Baby, Lil Durk and Travis Scott

Song by Lil Baby, Lil Durk and Travis Scott

from the album The Voice of the Heroes
- Released: June 4, 2021
- Genre: Trap
- Length: 4:17
- Label: Quality Control; 4PF; Only the Family; Capitol; Motown; Alamo; Interscope
- Songwriters: Dominique Jones; Durk Banks; Jacques Webster II; Chidi Osundu; Thanush Perinpanesan
- Producers: Chi Chi; Young TN

"Hats Off" is a song by American rappers Lil Baby, Lil Durk and Travis Scott. It was released on June 4, 2021 from the former two's collaborative studio album The Voice of the Heroes. The song was produced by Chi Chi and Young TN.

== Composition ==
The song features a trap beat, consisting of synthesizers. Lyrically, Lil Baby and Lil Durk describe their roles in the community: Durk always knows what to say and Baby can "save the day" in any situation. They two perform lengthy verses before Travis Scott closes out with his verse.

== Critical reception ==
The song was met with generally positive reviews. Fred Thomas of AllMusic described it as "unconventionally constructed yet uniquely catchy". Kyann-Sian Williams of NME regarded the song as having the best feature from The Voice of the Heroes, additionally writing "'Hats Off' sounds like an eerie sci-fi theme tune, exuding a melody that's fun and refreshing for trap. But then the 808s come in, perfectly illustrating why Durk and Baby are at the top of their game, before Houston's frontman Travis Scott offers a glimpse of the fresh-faced rapper we saw in his 2013 XXL Freshmen freestyle (predating his love of computerised vocals)."

== Charts ==
Chart performance for "Hats Off"
Chart (2021)	Peak position
Canada Hot 100 (Billboard)	27
Global 200 (Billboard)	23
Ireland (IRMA)	78
New Zealand Hot Singles (RMNZ)	6
UK Singles (OCC)	63
UK Hip Hop/R&B (OCC)	25
US Billboard Hot 100	16
US Hot R&B/Hip-Hop Songs (Billboard)	5

== Certifications ==
Region	Certification	Certified units/sales
United States (RIAA)	Platinum	1,000,000^{‡}
^{‡} Sales+streaming figures based on certification alone.
