= WondaGurl production discography =

The following list is a discography of production by WondaGurl, a Canadian record producer. It includes a list of songs produced, co-produced and remixed by year, artist, album and title.

== Singles produced ==
List of singles produced, with selected chart positions and certifications, showing year released and album name
Title	Year	Peak chart positions										Certifications	Album
Title	Year	US	AUS	BEL (FL)	CAN	FRA	GER	IRL	NZ	SWI	UK	Certifications	Album
"Bitch Better Have My Money" (Rihanna)	2015	19	14	27	11	3	17	39	10	7	27	ARIA: Platinum; RIAA: 3× Platinum; RMNZ: Gold	non-album single
"Antidote" (Travis Scott)	2015	16	75	38	120	—	—	—	—	—	—	ARIA: Gold; RIAA: 4× Platinum; RMNZ: Gold	Rodeo
"No Limit" (Remix) (Usher featuring A$AP Ferg, Master P, Travis Scott)	2016	32	45	—	—	—	—	—	—	—	—		Hard II Love
"Braille" (Ab-Soul featuring Bas)	2016	—	—	—	—	—	—	—	—	—	—		Do What Thou Wilt.
"—" denotes a recording that did not chart or was not released in that territory.

== 2013 ==
=== Travis Scott – Owl Pharaoh ===
- 05. "Uptown" (featuring ASAP Ferg)

=== Ryan Leslie – Black Mozart ===
- 06. "Full Moon"
- 08. "Evacuation"

=== Jay-Z – Magna Carta Holy Grail ===
- 08. "Crown"

=== SZA ===
- 00. "Teen Spirit"

== 2014 ==
=== Redway – Years Ahead' ===
- 06. "YKTO (You Know the Ones)"

=== Travis Scott – Days Before Rodeo ===
- 01. "Days Before Rodeo: The Prayer"

=== Ryan Leslie – MZRT ===
- 05. "New New"

== 2015 ==
=== Drake – If You're Reading This It's Too Late ===
- 11. "Used To" (featuring Lil Wayne)
- 14. "Company" (featuring Travis Scott)

=== Rihanna ===
- 00. "Bitch Better Have My Money"

=== Travis Scott – Rodeo ===
- 05. "90210" (featuring Kacy Hill) (Produced with DJ Dahi, Mike Dean and Allen Ritter)
- 09. "Antidote"
- 16. "Never Catch Me" (Produced with Sonny Digital, Mike Dean and Allen Ritter)

Leftover

- 00. "High Fashion" Travis Scott (featuring Future) (produced with Metro Boomin, Southside and TM88)
- 00. "The Prayer" (produced with Travis Scott)
- 00. "Hot Sauce" (featuring PartyNextDoor and Quentin Miller)

=== Young Thug – Slime Season ===
- 10. "Freaky"

=== Juicy J – O's to Oscars ===
- 12. "I Ain't Fukin Witcha" (featuring Logic)

== 2016 ==
=== Lil Uzi Vert – Lil Uzi Vert vs. the World ===
- 09. "Scott and Ramona"

=== Travis Scott – Birds in the Trap Sing McKnight ===
- 01. "The Ends" (featuring André 3000)
- 07. "Sweet Sweet"

=== Ab-Soul – Do What Thou Wilt. ===
- 02. "Braille" (featuring Bas)

=== Little Simz – Stillness in Wonderland ===
- 10. "Bad to the Bone" (featuring Bibi Bourelly)

=== Nessly – Solo Boy Band ===
- 07. "Moonwalking"

=== Sean Leon - Black Sheep Nirvana ===
- 00. "This Ain't 2012"
- 00. "Deep End"
- 00. "Killin' Mind" (produced with Sean Leon, MADEAT2AM and Jack Rochon)
- 00. "Guard/God Up"

=== Jahkoy Palmer ===
- 00. "Odd Future"

== 2017 ==
=== Big Sean – I Decided ===
- 04. "No Favors" (featuring Eminem) (produced with Big Sean and FrancisGotHeat)

=== Lil Uzi Vert – Luv Is Rage 2 ===
- 07. "Feelings Mutual"
- 12. "How to Talk"
- 14. "Malfunction"

=== Lil Yachty – Teenage Emotions ===
- 11. "Lady in Yellow"

=== Bryson Tiller – True to Self ===
- 04. "Blowing Smoke"

=== Cousin Stizz – One Night Only ===
- 11. "Jo Bros"
- 13. "Jealous"

=== 88Glam – 88Glam ===
- 08. "Give n Go"

== 2018 ==
=== Rich the Kid – The World Is Yours ===
- 05. "Too Gone" (featuring Khalid)

=== Travis Scott – Astroworld ===
- 06. "No Bystanders" (produced with TM88, Mike Dean and Gezin from 808 Mafia)
- 13. Can't Say (produced with Frank Dukes)

Leftover

=== Sheck Wes – Mudboy ===
- 06. "Never Lost"

=== Quavo – Quavo Huncho ===
- 13. "Rerun" (featuring Travis Scott)

=== Mariah Carey – Caution ===
- 07. "One Mo' Gen"

=== JID – DiCaprio 2 ===
- 14. "Hasta Luego"

=== Kris Wu – Antares ===
- 01. "Antares"
- 05. "We Alive"

=== KILLY – Surrender Your Soul ===
- 06. "Doomsday" (produced with Y2K)
- 07. "Never Let Up" (produced with Jenius)
- 09. "Pray For Me" (produced with Y2K)

=== KILLY – KILLSTREAK ===
- 01. "CHUPACABRA" (produced with London Cyr)
- 02. "ANTI EVERYBODY" (produced with VOU)
- 03. "EARNED IT" (produced with FrancisGotHeat)
- 04. "HELLRAISER" (produced with Y2K)
- 05. "BEAUTIFUL PT.2"

=== Ski Mask The Slump God – STOKELEY ===
- 09. "Get Geeked" (produced with Brendon Binns and G Koop)

== 2019 ==
=== 2 Chainz – Rap or Go to the League ===
- 06. "Whip" (featuring Travis Scott)

=== Nav – Bad Habits ===
- 02. "I'm Ready"

=== Yung Bans – Misunderstood ===
- 01. "Going Wild" (featuring Future)
- 06. "Shawty / In Love With All My Bitches"
- 10. "Ready Set Go" (featuring 03 Greedo and XXXTentacion)
- 15. "Yeaaa!" (featuring Future)

=== Red Bull – Toronto / Paris ===
- 01. Népal - "City Lights Pt.2"
- 02. Luidji - "Millésime"
- 03. Némir - "5h du mat"
- 04. Youv Dee - "Coquillage"
- 05. Moka Boka - "Nuage" (featuring Primero)
- 06. Nadia Rose - "Soul Rich"

=== JackBoys, Travis Scott - JackBoys ===
- 02. "JackBoys"
- 03. "GANG GANG" (with Sheck Wes)

== 2020 ==
=== Pop Smoke – Meet the Woo 2 ===
- 04. "Christopher Walking"
- 10. "Dreaming"

=== Don Toliver – Heaven or Hell ===
- 01. "Heaven Or Hell"
- 06. "Can't Feel My Legs"
- 07. "Candy"
- 08. "Company"
- 11. "No Photos"
- 12. "No Idea"

=== Pop Smoke – Shoot for the Stars, Aim for the Moon ===
- 01. "Bad Bitch from Tokyo"
- 02. "Aim for the Moon" (featuring Quavo)
- 28. "She Feelin Nice" (featuring Jamie Foxx)

=== Travis Scott ===
- 00. "The Plan"

=== Headie One – Edna ===
- 11. "Hear No Evil" (featuring Future)
- 20. "Cold" (featuring Kaash Paige)

=== Yung Bans ===
- 00. "Freak Show" (featuring Mulatto)

=== Masego – Studying Abroad ===
- 03. "Mystery Lady" (with Don Toliver)

Smoove'L

- 00. "Period"

=== Kid Cudi – Man on the Moon III: The Chosen ===
- 16. "Rockstar Knights" (with Trippie Redd)
- 17. "4 Da Kidz"

Anders

- 00. "Don't Play"

== 2021 ==
=== Drake – Certified Lover Boy ===
- 06. "Fair Trade" (featuring Travis Scott)

=== Arca - Kick II ===
- 05. "Luna Llena"

== 2022 ==
=== Kid Cudi – Entergalactic ===
- 14. "Somewhere to Fly" (with Don Toliver)

== 2023 ==
=== Kali Uchis – Red Moon in Venus ===
- 13. "Deserve Me" (featuring Summer Walker)

=== Lil Uzi Vert – Pink Tape ===
- 04. "Crush Em"

=== Travis Scott – Utopia ===
- 01. "Hyaena"
- 02. "Thank God"
- 04. "My Eyes"
- 06. "Sirens"
- 12. "Circus Maximus"

== 2024 ==
=== Nelly Furtado – 7 ===
- 01. "Showstopper"

=== Lil Uzi Vert – Eternal Atake 2 ===
- 01. "We Good"

== Remixes ==
=== 2016 ===
- Usher – "No Limit" (G-Mix)

=== 2018 ===
- Maroon 5 – "Girls Like You"
- Ludwig Göransson - "Killmonger"
