= Kick Out =

Promotional single by Travis Scott

from the album JackBoys 2
- Released: July 15, 2025
- Length: 2:50
- Label: Cactus Jack; Epic
- Songwriters: Jacques Webster II; Shéyaa Abraham-Joseph; Ozan Yıldırım; T-Minus; Sean Momberger
- Producers: Oz; T-Minus; Momberger

Music video
- "Kick Out" on YouTube

"Kick Out" is a song by American rapper and singer Travis Scott. It was released through Cactus Jack and Epic Records as the sole promotional single from JackBoys 2, his collaborative compilation album with his record label JackBoys (the artist name for Cactus Jack), on July 15, 2025. The song features uncredited additional vocals from fellow rapper 21 Savage, with the two writing the song with producers Oz, T-Minus, and Sean Momberger. It features an uncredited sample from the song "Pursuit" by Pixel Grip.

== Promotion ==
Scott debuted the song live alongside the single "Dumbo", another unreleased song of his from JackBoys 2 at his co-headlining performance at the Coachella 2025 festival on April 12 and then performed both of them again exactly a week later. He then performed "Kick Out" and "Dumbo" and confirmed that they would both appear on the album during his brief pop-up concert in Barcelona, Spain, on May 10, followed by a few other small performances.

== Controversy ==
On July 16, 2025, American electronic music group Pixel Grip took to social media to claim that Scott sampled their 2021 song, "Pursuit", on "Kick Out" without getting their approval. The group's members expressed that they like Scott's song but felt hurt about not receiving credit for the sample. They took to CBS News the following day, in which they said that producer Sean Momberger, who was involved in the production of "Kick Out", had reached out to them and said that Scott's Cactus Jack label will soon be reaching out to get the sample cleared.

== Music video ==
On April 30, Scott's 34th birthday, he released an unofficial music video teaser for "Kick Out" through his Instagram account. He officially released the same video on July 15, which sees him sport Chrome Hearts boots as he is in the countryside. He is seen driving a purple Lamborghini Huracán Sterrato into the rural area, where he spends time with horses at a stable before going fishing and catching a large bass. He then goes to a nightclub in the night and throws money on strippers who are twerking in the club before visiting his grandmother's house in their hometown of Houston, Texas. Scott also lifts his daughter, Stormi Webster, at the end of the video. The video does not include the second half of the song or any adlibs from fellow rapper 21 Savage that are in the official version.

== Charts ==
Chart performance for "Kick Out"
Chart (2025)	Peak position
Australia (ARIA)	82
Australia Hip Hop/R&B (ARIA)	9
Canada Hot 100 (Billboard)	58
Global 200 (Billboard)	47
Lithuania (AGATA)	94
New Zealand Hot Singles (RMNZ)	6
Poland (Polish Streaming Top 100)	92
Switzerland (Schweizer Hitparade)	62
UK Singles (OCC)	66
UK Hip Hop/R&B (OCC)	16
US Billboard Hot 100	50
US Hot R&B/Hip-Hop Songs (Billboard)	12
