= Dumbo (song) =

Single by Travis Scott

from the album JackBoys 2
- Released: July 14, 2025
- Recorded: 2024
- Genre: Trap; Alternative hip-hop
- Length: 3:58
- Label: Cactus Jack; Epic
- Songwriters: Jacques Webster II; Dilip Venkatesh; Othello Houston
- Producers: Dilip; Otxhello

Travis Scott singles chronology
"2000 Excursion" (2025)	"Dumbo" (2025)	"Shyne" (2025)

Music video
- "Dumbo" on YouTube

"Dumbo" is a song by American rapper and singer Travis Scott. It was released through Cactus Jack and Epic Records as the third single from JackBoys 2, his collaborative compilation album with his record label JackBoys (the artist name for Cactus Jack), on July 14, 2025. He wrote the song with producers Dilip and Otxhello.

== Promotion ==
A snippet of "Dumbo" was first played on February 13, 2025, in a locker room at Daikin Park in Scott's hometown of Houston, Texas, where he was hosting his annual HBCU celebrity softball classic. He debuted the song live alongside "Kick Out", another unreleased song of his from JackBoys 2 at his co-headlining performance at the Coachella 2025 festival on April 12 and then performed both of them again exactly a week later. Scott then performed the two songs and confirmed that they would both appear on the album during his brief pop-up concert in Barcelona, Spain, on May 10, followed by a shortened version of "Dumbo" also being performed six days later during his concert as part of his Circus Maximus Tour in Doha, Qatar. In a ranking of all songs from the album, Billboard's Michael Saponara saw "Dumbo" as the fifth best song, feeling that the song "finds Scott hitting on another lucid chorus that's also catchy — he's had a penchant for that over the course of his decorated career", "but his punchy bars seemingly play hopscotch across the spacy production", concluding that "for me, I would've preferred a different plan of attack with his verses to go with a plush hook, but there's definitely potential for 'Dumbo' to grow on fans".

== Music video ==
The official music video for "Dumbo", which was directed by Gabriel Moses, premiered on July 14, 2025. It sees Scott surrounded by women as he smokes a joint at the beginning as he raps from a living room and then takes a ride in his Lamborghini as his Cactus Jack signee and fellow American rapper Sheck Wes makes a cameo appearance. The video follows as he gets a tattoo of a tiger inked on him and one of the girls then touches it.

== Charts ==
Chart performance for "Dumbo"
Chart (2025)	Peak position
Australia Hip Hop/R&B (ARIA)	11
Canada Hot 100 (Billboard)	61
Global 200 (Billboard)	52
New Zealand Hot Singles (RMNZ)	8
Slovakia Singles Digital (ČNS IFPI)	97
South Africa Streaming (TOSAC)	31
Switzerland (Schweizer Hitparade)	63
UK Singles (OCC)	74
UK Hip Hop/R&B (OCC)	17
US Billboard Hot 100	54
US Hot R&B/Hip-Hop Songs (Billboard)	14
