= Shyne (song) =

Single by Travis Scott and GloRilla

from the album JackBoys 2
- Released: August 19, 2025
- Length: 3:13
- Label: Cactus Jack; Epic
- Songwriters: Jacques Webster II; Gloria Woods; Anthony Kilhoffer; AJ Williams; Mateus Pina Mendes
- Producers: Kilhoffer; Williams; ARPXX

Travis Scott singles chronology
"PBT" (2025)	"Shyne" (2025)	"Father" (2026)

GloRilla singles chronology
"Killin' It Girl" (2025)	"Shyne" (2025)	"Special" (2025)

"Shyne" is a song by American rappers Travis Scott and GloRilla. It was released through Cactus Jack and Epic Records as the sixth and final single from JackBoys 2, Scott's collaborative compilation album with his record label JackBoys (the artist name for Cactus Jack), on August 19, 2025. The two artists wrote the song with producers Anthony Kilhoffer, AJ Williams, and ARPXX.

== Composition and lyrics ==
In a ranking of all songs from the album, Billboard's Michael Saponara saw "Shyne" as the second worst song from the album, describing that "one of the weaker spots for La Flame [Scott] on the album" as fellow American rapper Bun B, who narrates the album, makes a reference to GloRilla's hometown of Memphis, Tennessee. GloRilla uses her sense of humor by saying: "My only regret is bein' too young to fuck Matthew McConaughey". Matthew Richie of Pitchfork gave a generally negative review of the song, saying that "evidenced by the fact that the Houston superstar [Scott] is only a positive contributor in sparse moments—meeting the occasion earnestly to match GloRilla's raucous energy on 'Shyne' (justice for the dueling Barrington Levy impressions)", which is mainly what the song went viral for.

== Charts ==
Chart performance for "Shyne"
Chart (2025)	Peak position
Canada Hot 100 (Billboard)	92
US Billboard Hot 100	93
US Hot R&B/Hip-Hop Songs (Billboard)	31
