= Where Was You =

Song by Travis Scott, Playboi Carti, and Future

from the album JackBoys 2
- Released: July 13, 2025
- Genre: Trap
- Length: 4:32
- Label: Cactus Jack; Epic
- Songwriters: Jacques Webster II; Jordan Carter; Nayvadius Wilburn; Richard Ortiz; John Ong
- Producers: F1lthy; Glasear

"Where Was You" is a song by American rappers Travis Scott, Playboi Carti, and Future. It was released through Cactus Jack and Epic Records as the tenth track from JackBoys 2, Scott's collaborative compilation album with his record label JackBoys (the artist name for Cactus Jack), on July 13, 2025. The three artists wrote the song with producers F1lthy and Glasear.

== Composition and lyrics ==
In a ranking of all songs from the album, Billboard's Michael Saponara saw "Where Was You" as the best song, describing that "Carti kicks off flexing his private jet trips to Mexico and lacing his girl with icy chains" and "Scott seemingly takes a page out of Future's "Where Ya At" flow while giving a rare look into personal life and surroundings while climbing the rap food chain". The production of the song was also complimented, in which its instrumental "floats with an odd, harpsichord-like melody". Carti has an "obligatory weave over an unmemorable F1LTHY beat" on the song, "which seems counterintuitive at its core".

== Charts ==
Chart performance for "Where Was You"
Chart (2025)	Peak position
Australia Hip Hop/R&B (ARIA)	19
Canada Hot 100 (Billboard)	77
Global 200 (Billboard)	107
US Billboard Hot 100	74
US Hot R&B/Hip-Hop Songs (Billboard)	25
