= JackBoys 2 =

Compilation album by JackBoys and Travis Scott
- Released: July 13, 2025
- Length: 55:36
- Labels: Cactus Jack; Epic
- Producers: 206Derek; AA; Ace G; AJ Williams; Anthony Kilhoffer; ARPXX; Bbykobe; Berg; BlakeSale; Rick Brown; Bugz Ronin; CameOne; Cardo; Luke Crowder; Dilip; Dirty Dave; DJ Moon; Elkan; F1lthy; Frankie Bash; Glasear; Lvusm; Johnny Juliano; Kesh; Mcevoy; Metro Boomin; Sean Momberger; Otxhello; Oz; Prodluke; Prodkavin; Southside; Jahaan Sweet; Tay Keith; T-Minus; TM88; Tony G2; Vegyn

JackBoys chronology
JackBoys (2019)	JackBoys 2 (2025)

Travis Scott chronology
Utopia (2023)	JackBoys 2 (2025)

Singles from JackBoys 2
- 1. "ILMB" Released: April 9, 2025; 2. "2000 Excursion" Released: July 8, 2025; 3. "Dumbo" Released: July 14, 2025; 4. "PBT" Released: August 6, 2025; 5. "No Comments" Released: August 8, 2025; 6. "Shyne" Released: August 19, 2025

JackBoys 2 is the second collaborative compilation album by American record label Cactus Jack Records, under its JackBoys banner, and its founder, American rapper and singer Travis Scott. It was released through the label alongside Epic Records on July 13, 2025. Aside from label members Don Toliver, Sheck Wes, SoFaygo and Wallie the Sensei, the album also features guest appearances from Playboi Carti, Future, SahBabii, Tyla, Vybz Kartel, GloRilla, YoungBoy Never Broke Again, and Kodak Black. Bonus editions additionally feature label member Luxury Tax 50 and Yeat. Fellow American rapper Bun B also provides skits throughout the album. JackBoys 2 serves as the sequel to their first compilation album (2019) and follows Scott's fourth studio album, Utopia (2023).

JackBoys 2 received generally mixed reviews from music critics. It debuted at number one on Billboard 200 chart, in which it earned 232,000 album-equivalent units, of which 160,000 units were pure album sales. The album was supported by six singles: "ILMB" (performed by Wes and Scott), "2000 Excursion" (performed by Scott, Wes, and Toliver), "Dumbo" (performed by Scott), "PBT" (performed by Scott, Tyla, and Vybz Kartel), "No Comments" (performed by Toliver), and "Shyne" (performed by Scott and GloRilla).

== Background and release ==
In March 2017, Scott announced he would be launching his own imprint, under the name of Cactus Jack Records. During an interview, Scott said, "I'm not doing it to have financial control over my music. I want first and foremost to help other artists, launch new names, to provide opportunities. I want to do for them what happened to me, but better."

On December 2, 2023, a fan met Scott while he was signing merchandise of his that fans bought inside of a car and asked him if JackBoys 2 was in the works, to which he replied: "For sure". On June 14, 2024, he revealed that he and his signees had been thinking of making the album during his performance as part of Cactus Jack at American music video director and record executive Cole Bennett's annual Summer Smash music festival. Cactus Jack signee Don Toliver hinted at the album by reposting the video trailer of the first JackBoys album from over five years before on his Instagram story on January 17, 2025.

On March 19, 2025, the album was officially announced with text being written on a building in Hong Kong: "What the fuck is we doing? JACKBOYS 2 on the way". Four days later, Scott officially announced that the album is "on the way" during his very early morning performance at the nightclub LIV in Miami Beach, Florida. On April 9, 2025, Scott released a collaboration with his Cactus Jack signee, Sheck Wes, titled "ILMB" as the lead single from the album. During Scott's co-headlining set at the Coachella 2025 festival three days later, he performed the songs "Kick Out" and "Dumbo" for the first time and performed them again at the festival on April 19. On April 30, his 34th birthday, he released an unofficial music video teaser for "Kick Out" through his Instagram account and shared the official trailer for the album, which was directed by Harmony Korine, who shot the cover art for the first JackBoys album. A pre-order for vinyl, CDs, and box sets of JackBoys 2 was made available on his website the following day. Starting from July 3, some of the artists started confirming their involvement on the album by posting pictures of themselves on Instagram standing in front of a custom-made gray Lamborghini Huracán with a JackBoys 2 logo, which Scott gifted them. Some of these artists include 21 Savage, GloRilla, Kodak Black, and Tyla. On July 8, Scott, Wes, and Toliver released the second single of the album, "2000 Excursion". He announced the release date of the album and confirmed that it would consist of 17 tracks two days later. "Dumbo", which was performed by Scott, was released as the third single on July 14, the day after the album's release. A bonus edition of the album with additional tracks, was released on July 16 and uploaded to streaming media the following day. The fourth and final single of the album, "PBT", which was performed by Scott, South African singer Tyla, and Jamaican dancehall artist Vybz Kartel, was sent to US rhythmic radio on August 6, 2025. "No Comments", which was performed by Toliver, was released as the fifth single from the album two days later. The sixth and final single, "Shyne", which was performed by Scott and fellow American rapper GloRilla, was sent to US rhythmic radio on August 19, 2025.

== Critical reception ==
Professional ratings
Aggregate scores
Source	Rating
Metacritic	48/100
Review scores
Source	Rating
AllMusic	2/5 stars
Clash	7/10
HotNewHipHop	3/5 stars
Pitchfork	4.8/10
RapReviews	6/10
Rolling Stone	2.5/5 stars
Slant	1.5/5 stars

According to the review aggregator Metacritic, JackBoys 2 received "mixed or average reviews" based on a weighted average score of 48 out of 100 from 6 critic scores. Robin Murray's review for Clash concludes: "Ultimately, for those who find Travis Scott's work to be style over substance, JackBoys 2 isn't going to win them over. For those in thrall to the style, however, there's much to chew on". Paul Attard of Slant wrote that the album had "little interest in establishing any coherent identity for the label or the artists involved" and that there was "no camaraderie to speak of on the majority of this set". Writing for Rolling Stone, Mosi Reeves wrote that the album "unfolds like a mediocre Netflix movie, an amusing late-night diversion that's hard to remember the next day." Steve Juon of RapReviews described the album as "just repetitive and monotonous". Matthew Ritchie of Pitchfork described the album as "little more than proof of life for a beleaguered group of artists struggling to get traction, highlighting a label boss who's doing very little to help."

== Commercial performance ==
In the United States, JackBoys 2 debuted at #1 on the Billboard 200, earning 233,000 album-equivalent units (including 160,000 in pure album sales) in its first week. This became Scott's fifth album to top the chart and the fourth that he was credited for. The album also accumulated a total of 94.86 million on-demand streams of the album's songs, with six songs debuting in the Billboard Hot 100, all of which were performed by him.

== Track listing ==
JackBoys 2 track listing
No.	Title	Writer(s)	Producer(s)	Length
1.	"JB2 Radio" (performed by JackBoys)	Jacques Webster II; Joseph Thornalley	Vegyn	0:31
2.	"Champain & Vacay" (performed by Travis Scott and Don Toliver)	Webster; Caleb Toliver; Juaquin Malphurs; Kobe Hood; Cole Morie; Keshav Balaji	Bbykobe; Mcevoy; Kesh	3:04
3.	"2000 Excursion" (performed by Travis Scott, Sheck Wes, and Don Toliver)	Webster; Khadimou Fall; Toliver; Thornalley; Ronald LaTour, Jr.; Jahaan Sweet; John Julian	Vegyn; Cardo; Sweet; Johnny Juliano	3:42
4.	"Kick Out" (performed by Travis Scott)	Webster; Shéyaa Abraham-Joseph; Rita Kililis; Tyler Ommen; Jonathon Freund; Ozan Yıldırım; Tyler Williams; Sean Momberger; Douglas Ford	Oz; T-Minus; Momberger	2:50
5.	"Dumbo" (performed by Travis Scott)	Webster; Ford; Dilip Venkatesh; Othello Houston	Dougie F; Dilip; Otxhello	3:58
6.	"MM3" (performed by SoFaygo)	Andre Burt; Patrick Houston; LaTour	Cardo	2:54
7.	"Velour" (performed by Don Toliver and Sheck Wes)	Toliver; Fall; Daniel Pérez; Derek Anderson; Luke Crowder	Bugz Ronin; Crowder; 206Derek	2:24
8.	"Contest" (performed by Travis Scott and SoFaygo)	Webster; Burt; LaTour; Blake Jacob; Luke Nakamura	Cardo; BlakeSale; ProdLuke	4:32
9.	"ILMB" (performed by Sheck Wes and Travis Scott)	Fall; Webster; Arman Andican	AA	3:04
10.	"Where Was You" (performed by Travis Scott, Playboi Carti, and Future)	Webster; Jordan Carter; Nayvadius Wilburn; Richard Ortiz; John Ong	F1lthy; Glasear	4:32
11.	"No Comments" (performed by Don Toliver)	Toliver; Sweet; Anderson	Sweet; 206Derek	2:09
12.	"Beep Beep" (performed by Travis Scott and SahBabii)	Webster; Saaheem Valdery; Venkatesh; Alex Ernewein; Bailey Goldberg	Dilip; Ace G; Berg	3:54
13.	"PBT" (performed by Travis Scott, Tyla, and Vybz Kartel)	Webster; Tyla Seethal; Adidja Palmer; Bibi Bourelly; Hood; Ford	Bbykobe	4:10
14.	"Shyne" (performed by Travis Scott and GloRilla)	Webster; Gloria Woods; Anthony Kilhoffer; AJ Williams; Mateus Pina Mendes; Ford	Kilhoffer; A. Williams; ARPXX	3:13
15.	"Outside" (performed by Travis Scott and YoungBoy Never Broke Again)	Webster; Kentrell Gaulden; Hood	Bbykobe	3:03
16.	"Cant Stop" (performed by Don Toliver, Future, and Wallie the Sensei)	Toliver; Wilburn; Traquan Tyson; Colin Franken; David Marcus; Venkatesh	Frankie Bash; Dirty Dave; Dilip	2:12
17.	"Florida Flow" (performed by Travis Scott and Kodak Black)	Webster; Bill Kapri; Brytavious Chambers; Venkatesh; Michael Cerda; Miguel Santiago	Tay Keith; CameOne; Dilip; Lvusm	5:28
Total length:				55:40

Deluxe bonus tracks
No.	Title	Writer(s)	Producer(s)	Length
18.	"Da Wizard" (performed by Travis Scott)	Webster; Leland Wayne; Bryan Simmons; Corey Moon	Metro Boomin; TM88; DJ Moon	2:37
19.	"Trip Out" (performed by Sheck Wes and Yeat)	Fall; Noah Smith; Paul Agyei; Prodkavin	Elkan; Prodkavin	2:16
20.	"110 South" (performed by Wallie the Sensei and Luxury Tax)	Tyson; Lawrence Taylor; Rick Brown; Tony G2	Brown; Tony G2	2:47
Total length:				63:24

Notes

- The bonus tracks were originally available upon the album's release in separate digital versions with different covers before being officially added to streaming platforms on August 20, 2025.
- "JB2 Radio", "Champain & Vacay", "Velour", "Where Was You", "No Comments", "Beep Beep", "PBT", "Shyne", "Outside", "Florida Flow", and "110 South" feature skit vocals from Bun B.
- "Kick Out" and "Shyne" feature skit vocals from Vybz Kartel.
- "Champain & Vacay" features additional vocals from Waka Flocka Flame.
- "Kick Out" features additional vocals from 21 Savage.
- "Cant Stop" features additional vocals from Molly Santana.

Sample credits

- "2000 Excursion" contains an uncredited sample of "Power", written by Kanye West, Larry Griffin, Mike Dean, Jeff Bhasker, Andwele Gardner, Ken Lewis, Francois Bernheim, Jean-Pierre Lang, Boris Bergman, Robert Fripp, Michael Giles, Greg Lake, Ian McDonald, Peter Sinfield, Ronald Isley, O'Kelly Isley, Rudolph Isley, Billy Carter, Harold Cowart, Jimmy O'Rourke and Ron Ziegler, and performed by West.
- "Kick Out" contains a sample of "Pursuit", performed by Pixel Grip.
- "Shyne" contains an uncredited interpolation of "Here I Come", written by Barrington Levy, Emanuele Palumbo, Gennaro Petito and Paul Love, and performed by Levy.

== Charts ==
=== Weekly charts ===
Weekly chart performance for JackBoys 2
Chart (2025)	Peak position
Australian Albums (ARIA)	3
Australian Hip Hop/R&B Albums (ARIA)	1
Austrian Albums (Ö3 Austria)	4
Belgian Albums (Ultratop Flanders)	9
Belgian Albums (Ultratop Wallonia)	18
Canadian Albums (Billboard)	4
Czech Albums (ČNS IFPI)	6
Danish Albums (Hitlisten)	10
Dutch Albums (Album Top 100)	4
Finnish Albums (Suomen virallinen lista)	21
French Albums (SNEP)	19
German Albums (Offizielle Top 100)	9
Hungarian Albums (MAHASZ)	2
Icelandic Albums (Tónlistinn)	6
Italian Albums (FIMI)	17
Japanese Hot Albums (Billboard Japan)	29
Lithuanian Albums (AGATA)	8
New Zealand Albums (RMNZ)	5
Nigerian Albums (TurnTable)	19
Norwegian Albums (IFPI Norge)	7
Polish Albums (ZPAV)	7
Portuguese Albums (AFP)	2
Slovak Albums (ČNS IFPI)	6
Spanish Albums (Promusicae)	27
Swedish Albums (Sverigetopplistan)	27
Swiss Albums (Schweizer Hitparade)	2
UK Compilation Albums (Official Charts)	2
US Billboard 200	1
US Top R&B/Hip-Hop Albums (Billboard)	1

=== Year-end charts ===
Year-end chart performance for JackBoys 2
Chart (2025)	Position
US Billboard 200	142
US Top R&B/Hip-Hop Albums (Billboard)	40
