= Out West (song) =

2020 single by Travis Scott featuring Young Thug

Single by JACKBOYS, Travis Scott and Young Thug

from the album JackBoys
- Released: February 18, 2020
- Genre: Trap
- Length: 2:38
- Label: Epic; Cactus Jack
- Songwriters: Jacques Webster II; Jeffery Williams; Tyron Douglas; Jason Baker
- Producers: Buddah Bless; Jabz

Travis Scott singles chronology
"Give No Fxk" (2020)	"Out West" (2020)	"Turks" (2020)

Young Thug singles chronology
"Give No Fxk" (2020)	"Out West" (2020)	"Bullets with Names" (2020)

Music video
- "Out West" on YouTube

"Out West" (stylized in all caps) is a song released by American record label Cactus Jack Records, known as hip-hop group JackBoys, performed by leader American rapper Travis Scott featuring fellow American rapper Young Thug. It was sent to rhythmic contemporary radio on February 18, 2020, as the third single from the compilation album, JackBoys (2019), by the lead artists. In late December 2019, shortly after the release of JackBoys, TikTok star Nicole Bloomgarden created the "Out West Challenge" and the dance challenge went viral on TikTok in February 2020.

== Music video ==
The music video was released on March 20, 2020. It was co-directed by Travis Scott alongside White Trash Tyler and shows a house party with women twerking while Young Thug performs above the crowd. The scene then heads to the bathroom, where a girl is found passed out by the toilet and Quincy Jones is washing his face and hands. He also appears in the end of the clip walking around with a sandwich and eating it.

The video features cameos from Cactus Jack artists Sheck Wes, Don Toliver, Luxury Tax and Chase B. Rappers 21 Savage, Yung Kayo and Young Jordan appear in the video as well; the latter two are signed to Young Thug's record label YSL Records.

== Charts ==
=== Weekly charts ===
Chart (2019–2020)	Peak position
Australia (ARIA)	79
Austria (Ö3 Austria Top 40)	73
Canada Hot 100 (Billboard)	29
France (SNEP)	117
Hungary (Stream Top 40)	39
Iceland (Tónlistinn)	34
Ireland (IRMA)	69
Portugal (AFP)	52
Switzerland (Schweizer Hitparade)	34
US Billboard Hot 100	38
US Hot R&B/Hip-Hop Songs (Billboard)	15
US Rhythmic Airplay (Billboard)	11
US Rolling Stone Top 100	5

=== Year-end charts ===
Chart (2020)	Position
Canada (Canadian Hot 100)	80
US Hot R&B/Hip-Hop Songs (Billboard)	50
US Rhythmic (Billboard)	47

== Certifications ==
Region	Certification	Certified units/sales
Canada (Music Canada)	Platinum	80,000^{‡}
Denmark (IFPI Danmark)	Gold	45,000^{‡}
France (SNEP)	Gold	100,000^{‡}
Italy (FIMI)	Gold	35,000^{‡}
Mexico (AMPROFON)	2× Platinum+Gold	150,000^{‡}
New Zealand (RMNZ)	Platinum	30,000^{‡}
Poland (ZPAV)	Platinum	50,000^{‡}
Portugal (AFP)	Gold	5,000^{‡}
United Kingdom (BPI)	Silver	200,000^{‡}
United States (RIAA)	4× Platinum	4,000,000^{‡}
Streaming
Greece (IFPI Greece)	Platinum	2,000,000^{†}
^{‡} Sales+streaming figures based on certification alone.^{†} Streaming-only figures based on certification alone.
