= Mudboy (album) =

Studio album by Sheck Wes
- Released: October 5, 2018
- Recorded: 2017–2018
- Genres: Hip-hop; trap; punk rap
- Length: 48:53
- Labels: Cactus Jack; GOOD; Interscope
- Producers: 16yrold; Cardo; Digital Nas; Goldin; Ice; Redda; Take a Daytrip; WondaGurl; YungLunchBox

Sheck Wes chronology
Mudboy (2018)	JackBoys (2019)

Singles from Mudboy
- 1. "Live Sheck Wes" Released: March 31, 2017; 2. "Mo Bamba" Released: June 16, 2017; 3. "Chippi Chippi" Released: August 28, 2018

Professional ratings
Aggregate scores
Source	Rating
Metacritic	76/100
Review scores
Source	Rating
Exclaim!	7/10
HipHopDX	3.8/5
Pitchfork	8.2/10
Sputnikmusic	3/5
XXL	3/5

Mudboy is the debut studio album by American rapper Sheck Wes. It was released on October 5, 2018, by Cactus Jack Records, GOOD Music, and Interscope Records. The album debuted at number 17 on the Billboard 200 in the United States. It was supported by three singles: "Live Sheck Wes", "Mo Bamba", and "Chippi Chippi". "Mo Bamba" peaked at number 6 on the Billboard Hot 100 in the United States and was a sleeper hit, with the song going viral in mid-2018, approximately a year after its release.

== Accolades ==
Publication	Accolade	Rank	Ref.
Pitchfork	Top 50 Albums of 2018	33	

== Track listing ==
Credits adapted from Tidal.

No.	Title	Writer(s)	Producer(s)	Length
1.	"Mindfucker"	Khadimou Fall; Nasir Pemberton	Digital Nas	3:00
2.	"Live Sheck Wes"	Fall; Coby "YungLunchBox" Rhodes	YungLunchBox	2:27
3.	"Gmail"	Fall; Rhodes	YungLunchBox	3:36
4.	"Wanted"	Fall; Bryan "Redda" Trillos; Oscar "Ice" Vidal	Redda; Ice	4:01
5.	"Chippi Chippi"	Fall; Trillos	Redda	3:49
6.	"Never Lost"	Fall; Ebony Oshunrinde; Stephen Marshall	WondaGurl	4:20
7.	"WESPN"	Fall; Rhodes	YungLunchBox	4:33
8.	"Kyrie"	Fall; Trillos	Redda	2:47
9.	"Mo Bamba"	Fall; Jerry "16yrold" Cruz; Denzel Baptiste; David Biral	16yrold; Take a Daytrip	3:03
10.	"Burn Slow"	Fall; Rhodes	YungLunchBox	3:12
11.	"Jiggy on the Shits"	Fall; Rhodes	YungLunchBox	3:22
12.	"F**k Everybody"	Fall; Rhodes	YungLunchBox	3:02
13.	"Danimals"	Fall; Ronald LaTour	Cardo	3:40
14.	"Vetements Socks"	Fall; Joshua Goldin-McCarthy	Goldin	4:09
Total length:				48:53

Notes

- "Live Sheck Wes" was originally released as "Live SheckWes Die SheckWes".

== Personnel ==
- Sheck Wes – vocals, writer
- Anthony Kilhoffer – mixing, mastering (tracks 1–8, 10–14)
- Marvy Ayy – mixing (track 9)
- Take a Daytrip – recording, mastering (track 9)

== Charts ==
=== Weekly charts ===
Chart (2018)	Peak position
Belgian Albums (Ultratop Flanders)	115
Canadian Albums (Billboard)	19
Dutch Albums (Album Top 100)	121
US Billboard 200	17
US Top R&B/Hip-Hop Albums (Billboard)	11

=== Year-end charts ===
Chart (2018)	Position
US Top R&B/Hip-Hop Albums (Billboard)	97
Chart (2019)	Position
US Top R&B/Hip-Hop Albums (Billboard)	83

== Certifications ==
Region	Certification	Certified units/sales
Canada (Music Canada)	Gold	40,000^{‡}
New Zealand (RMNZ)	Gold	7,500^{‡}
United States (RIAA)	Gold	500,000^{‡}
^{‡} Sales+streaming figures based on certification alone.
