= JackBoys (rap group) =

Rap group led by Travis Scott

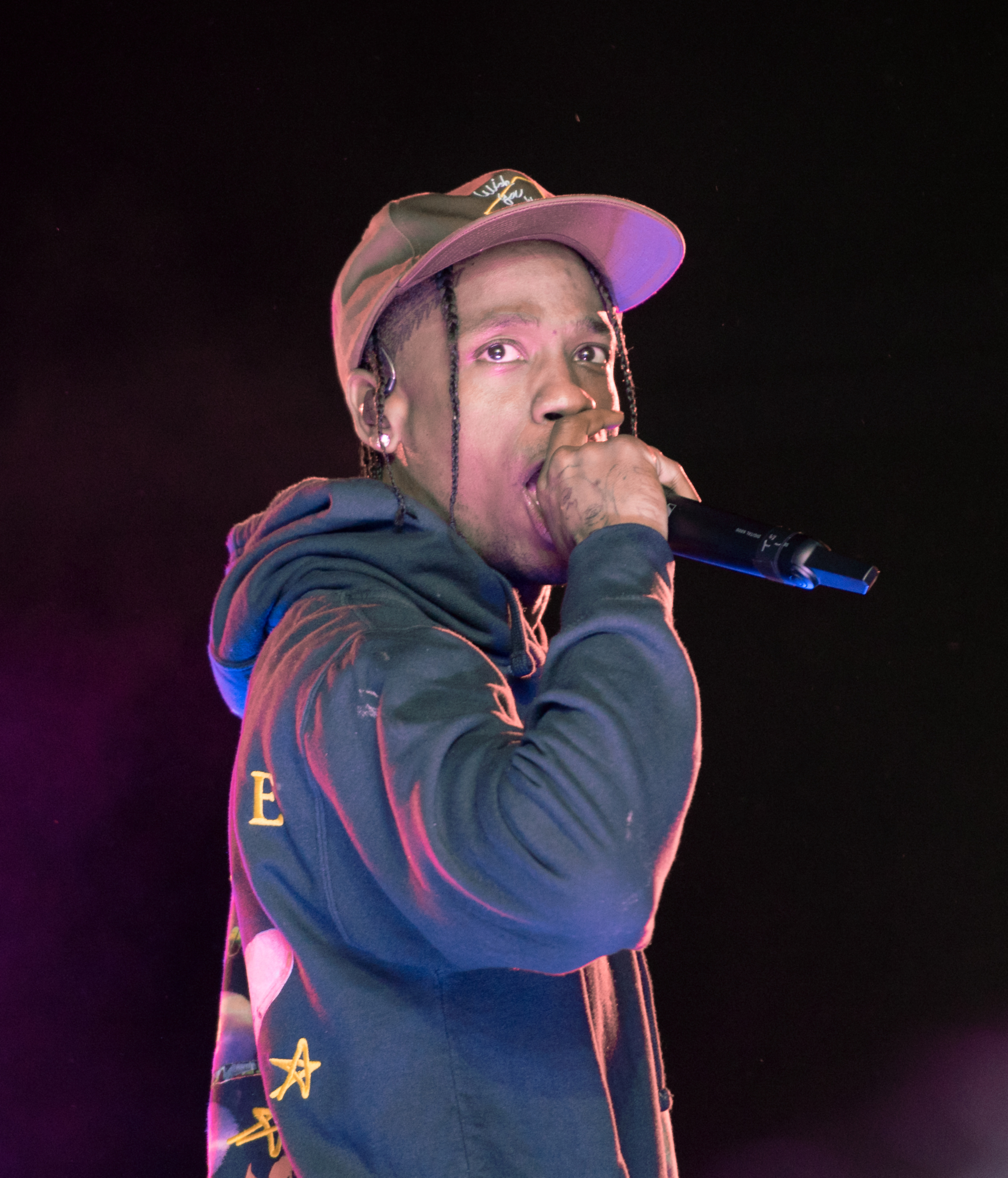
- JackBoys' founder Travis Scott performing at the Openair Frauenfeld in 2019

Background information
- Origin: Houston, Texas, U.S.
- Genres: Hip-hop
- Years active: 2017–present
- Labels: Cactus Jack; Epic
- Members: Travis Scott; Don Toliver; Sheck Wes; SoFaygo; Chase B Wallie the Sensei; Luxury Tax 50

JackBoys is an American rap group composed of artists signed to Cactus Jack Records, a record label founded by rapper Travis Scott. Its current members includes Scott himself, Don Toliver, Sheck Wes, SoFaygo, Chase B, Wallie the Sensei, and Luxury Tax 50. They released the compilation album JackBoys in 2019 and their second compilation, JackBoys 2, in 2025. Both albums peaked atop the Billboard 200 chart.

== History ==
In March 2017, Scott announced he would be launching his own imprint, under the name of Cactus Jack Records. During an interview, Scott said, "I'm not doing it to have financial control over my music. I want first and foremost to help other artists, launch new names, to provide opportunities. I want to do for them what happened to me, but better." In September 2017, fellow American rapper Smokepurpp signed to the label, but he left sometime later in 2019.

In February 2018, the label signed Sheck Wes in a joint deal with Interscope Records and GOOD Music. In August, Don Toliver was signed to the label. After the release of Scott's third studio album, Astroworld (2018), artists Wes and Toliver began to rise to popularity after they appeared on the album. Wes's June 2017 single, "Mo Bamba", went viral in 2018 and Toliver's May 2019 single, "No Idea", went viral on the app TikTok in the same year. Wes and Toliver both helped Scott on Astroworld, with Wes being featured alongside fellow American rapper Juice Wrld on "No Bystanders" and Toliver being featured on "Can't Say". On November 29, 2019, Scott released JackBoys merchandise on his website, including a digital album preorder for $10. On December 24, Scott revealed on Twitter that the album JackBoys would be released within the week. The album was released on December 27, 2019, and included guest appearances from Rosalía, Lil Baby, Quavo, Offset, Young Thug, and the late Pop Smoke. It was supported by three singles: "Had Enough" by Don Toliver featuring Quavo and Offset, the Rosalía and Lil Baby remix of Scott's "Highest in the Room", and "Out West" by Scott featuring Young Thug.

In March 2025, Scott announced the label's second compilation album JackBoys 2. Later on April, he released official merch and box sets, along with a musical short film directed by filmmaker Harmony Korine as the album's trailer. The same day West Coast artist Wallie the Sensei, known for being featured on the song "Dodger Blue" from Kendrick Lamar's 2024 album GNX, was announced as the label's newest signing as well as his participation on the album. The album contained the single "ILMB" by Sheck Wes and Scott, with a confirmed track named "Kick Out" which is expected to make part of the album.

On the July 13, 2025, JackBoys 2 was released, supported by the pre-album singles, "ILMB" by Travis Scott and Sheck Wes and "2000 Excursion" by both with Don Toliver.

== Members ==
- Travis Scott (2017–present; founder)
- Chase B – DJ (2017–present)
- Don Toliver (2018–present)
- Sheck Wes (2018–present)
- Luxury Tax 50 (2019–present)
- SoFaygo (2021–present)
- Wallie the Sensei (2025–present)

== Discography ==
=== Compilation albums ===
Artist	Album	Details
JackBoys and Travis Scott	JackBoys (released with Epic)	Released: December 27, 2019; Chart position: #1 U.S.; RIAA certification: –
JackBoys and Travis Scott	JackBoys 2 (released with Epic)	Released: July 13, 2025; Chart position: #1 U.S.

=== Charted songs ===
List of songs, with selected chart positions, showing year released and album name
Title	Year	Peak chart positions					Certifications	Album
Title	Year	US	US R&B/HH	AUS	CAN	UK	Certifications	Album
"Gang Gang" (with Sheck Wes)	2019	48	22	63	40	52	RIAA: Platinum	JackBoys
"Out West" (with Travis Scott and Young Thug)	2019	38	15	79	29	—	RIAA: 3× Platinum; BPI: Silver	JackBoys
"What to Do?" (with Travis Scott and Don Toliver)	2019	56	26	86	38	57	RIAA: Platinum	JackBoys
"Gatti" (with Pop Smoke and Travis Scott)	2019	69	33	—	61	59	RIAA: 2× Platinum; BPI: Silver	JackBoys
"—" denotes a recording that did not chart or was not released in that territory.
