= The Best in the World Pack =

EP by Drake
- Released: June 15, 2019
- Recorded: 2019
- Genres: Hip hop; trap
- Length: 7:05
- Labels: Frozen Moments; Republic; OVO
- Producers: Asoteric; Cydney Christine; Deats; DeLorean Black; EY; Ljay Currie; OZ

Drake chronology
Scorpion (2018)	The Best in the World Pack (2019)	Care Package (2019)

Singles from The Best in the World Pack
- 1. "Omertà" Released: June 15, 2019; 2. "Money in the Grave" Released: June 15, 2019

The Best in the World Pack is the third extended play by Canadian rapper Drake. It was released on June 15, 2019, by Frozen Moments, Republic Records and OVO Sound. It contains the dual singles "Omertà" and "Money in the Grave", with the latter featuring a guest appearance from American rapper Rick Ross, and later becoming Drake's 26th and Ross' 2nd number one respectively, on Billboard's Rhythmic Songs chart in August 2019. Multiple publications noted that the EP marks Drake's first release outside of the Cash Money Records and Young Money Records record labels. Instead, on streaming services, the release lists "2019 Frozen Moments, LLC, under exclusive licensing to Republic Records, a division of UMG Recordings, Inc". Billboard confirmed that Frozen Moments has previously been listed on additional OVO projects.

== Background ==
Drake posted the cover of both songs on his social media on June 14, 2019. After the NBA Championship win of the Toronto Raptors, the songs served as a "celebration release". Drake was named Global Ambassador of the team and was previously seen attending the 2019 NBA Finals.

== Track listing ==
Credits adapted from Tidal, all tracks are written by Aubrey Graham, alongside others.

No.	Title	Writer(s)	Producer(s)	Length
1.	"Omertà"	Ozan Yildirim; Eyobed Getachew; Dominik Patrzek; Matthew Samuels; William Withers Jr.	OZ; EY; Deats	3:40
2.	"Money in the Grave" (featuring Rick Ross)	William Roberts II; Cydney Dade; Lorne Currie Jr.; Anton Kuehl-Joergensen; DeLorean Black	Cydney Christine; Ljay Currie; Asoteric; Black	3:25
Total length:				7:05

== Personnel ==
Credits adapted from Tidal.

- 40 – mixing (all tracks)
- Harley Arsenault – mixing assistant (all tracks)
- Greg Moffet – mixing assistant (all tracks)
- Les "Bates" Bateman – engineering (all tracks)
- Lindsay Warner – engineering (all tracks)
