= JackBoys =

Compilation album by JackBoys and Travis Scott
- Released: December 27, 2019
- Recorded: 2019
- Studios: Cotton Row (Memphis); Hypnotize Minds (Memphis)
- Genres: Hip hop; trap
- Length: 21:22
- Labels: Cactus Jack; Epic
- Producers: 808Melo; Axl; Buddah Bless; Cash Passion; Earlyyellow; El Michels; Jabz; Jenius; London Cyr; Mike Dean; Nik D; OZ; Sarah Schachner; TM88; Vou; WondaGurl

JackBoys chronology
JackBoys (2019)	JackBoys 2 (2025)

Travis Scott chronology
Astroworld (2018)	JackBoys (2019)	Utopia (2023)

Singles from JackBoys
- 1. "Had Enough" Released: December 27, 2019; 2. "Highest in the Room (Remix)" Released: January 7, 2020; 3. "Out West" Released: February 18, 2020

Professional ratings
Review scores
Source	Rating
AllMusic	3/5 stars
Clash	7/10
Exclaim!	6/10
HipHopDX	3.3/5
Mic Cheque	7/10
Pitchfork	5.9/10
RapReviews	5.5/10
Sputnikmusic	3/5

JackBoys is the debut collaborative compilation album by American record label Cactus Jack Records, under its JackBoys banner, and its founder, American rapper Travis Scott. It was released through Cactus Jack Records in collaboration with Epic Records on December 27, 2019.

The project features performances from Cactus Jack label members Scott, Sheck Wes, Don Toliver, and Chase B. Guest appearances include Rosalía, Lil Baby, Quavo, Offset, Young Thug, and Pop Smoke.

JackBoys is a hip hop collective consisting of rappers signed to Travis Scott's Cactus Jack imprint, including Scott himself, Sheck Wes, Don Toliver, SoFaygo, and DJ Chase B, while Luxury Tax 50 joined the Cactus Jack Records in 2019, and Wallie the Sensei joined the Cactus Jack Records in 2025 until its release on second collaborative album, JackBoys 2. Upon release, ‘‘JackBoys’’ debuted at number one on the US Billboard 200 chart dated January 11, 2020, becoming the first number-one album of the 2020s. It was Scott’s third album to debut atop the chart, following Astroworld (2018).

== Background and release ==
In March 2017, Scott announced he would be launching his own imprint, under the name of Cactus Jack Records. During an interview, Scott said, "I'm not doing it to have financial control over my music. I want first and foremost to help other artists, launch new names, to provide opportunities. I want to do for them what happened to me, but better." In September 2017, fellow American rapper Smokepurpp signed to the label, but he left sometime later in 2019. In February 2018, the label signed Sheck Wes in a joint deal with Interscope Records and GOOD Music. In August, Don Toliver was signed to the label. After the release of Scott's third studio album, Astroworld (2018), artists Wes and Toliver began to rise to popularity after they appeared on the album. Wes's June 2017 single, "Mo Bamba", went viral in 2018 and Toliver's May 2019 single, "No Idea", went viral on the app TikTok in the same year. Wes and Toliver both helped Scott on Astroworld, with Wes being featured alongside fellow American rapper Juice Wrld on "No Bystanders" and Toliver being featured on "Can't Say". On November 29, 2019, Scott released JackBoys merchandise on his website, including a digital album preorder for $10. On December 24, Scott revealed on Twitter that the album would be released within the week. On December 26, a day before the album was released, the cover art and release date were revealed and the song titles were leaked on Shazam.

=== Singles ===
The lead single of the album, "Had Enough", performed by American rapper and singer Don Toliver that features American rappers Quavo and Offset from the hip hop trio Migos, was released along with the album on December 27, 2019. The remix of Scott's 2019 single, "Highest in the Room", features Spanish singer Rosalía and American rapper Lil Baby was sent to Italian contemporary hit radio as the second single on January 7, 2020. The third and final single, "Out West", performed by JackBoys and Scott that features American rapper Young Thug, was sent to rhythmic contemporary radio on February 18, 2020.

== Commercial performance ==
JackBoys debuted at number one on the US Billboard 200 with 154,000 album-equivalent units, of which 79,000 were pure album sales. In its second week, the album dropped to number four on the chart, earning 47,000 album-equivalent units. In its third week, the album dropped to number seven on the chart, earning 38,000 more units that week. All the songs on the album debuted on the Billboard Hot 100 with the exception of the titular track.

== Track listing ==
No.	Title	Writer(s)	Producer(s)	Length
1.	"Highest in the Room" (remix) (Travis Scott featuring Rosalía and Lil Baby)	Jacques Webster II; Rosalía Tobella; Dominique Jones; Michael Dean; Ozan Yildirim; Nik Frascona	Mike Dean; Oz; Nik D	4:04
2.	"JackBoys" (JackBoys)	Webster; Dean; Ebony Oshunrinde; Ugur Tig	Dean; WondaGurl^{[a]}	0:46
3.	"Gang Gang" (JackBoys and Sheck Wes)	Khadimou Fall; Caleb Toliver; Webster; Lawrence Taylor; Oshunrinde; Tig	WondaGurl; Vou	4:04
4.	"Had Enough" (Don Toliver featuring Quavo and Offset)	Toliver; Quavious Marshall; Kiari Cephus; Beyoncé Knowles; Shawn Carter; Marcello Valenzano; Andre Christopher Lyon; Homer Steinweiss; Thomas Brenneck; Mike Herard; James Fauntleroy II; Bryan Simmons; Leon Michels; Dean	TM88; El Michels; Dean; Cash Passion^{[c]}	2:37
5.	"Out West" (featuring Young Thug)	Webster; Jeffery Williams; Tyron Douglas; Jason Baker	Buddah Bless; Jabz	2:37
6.	"What to Do?" (featuring Don Toliver)	Webster; Toliver; Fall; Dean; James Cyr; Julius-Alexander Brown; Niv Kalisky; Sarah Schachner; Douglas Ford	Dean; London Cyr; Jenius; Earlyyellow^{[b]}; Schachner^{[b]}	4:10
7.	"Gatti" (with Pop Smoke)	Webster; Bashar Jackson; Andre Loblack; Manalla Yusuf; Petr Klapka	808Melo; Axl^{[a]}	3:01
Total length:				21:19

Notes

- ^{^[a]} signifies a co-producer
- ^{^[b]} signifies a miscellaneous producer
- ^{^[c]} signifies an uncredited additional producer
- All tracks are stylized in all caps.
- "JackBoys" was titled as "Intro" when the album released and changed a day later.
- "Gang Gang" features uncredited vocals by Don Toliver, Travis Scott, and Luxury Tax.
- "What to Do?" features additional vocals by Sheck Wes.

Sample credits

- "Gang Gang" contains interpolations of "Win", written by Johnny McKinzie, Kendrick Duckworth, Matthew Samuels, Anderson Hernandez, Elmer Bernstein, and Corey Thompson, and performed by Jay Rock.
- "Had Enough" contains elements of "Summer", written by Beyoncé Knowles, Shawn Carter, Marcello Valenzano, Andre Christopher Lyon, Leon Michels, Homer Steinweiss, Thomas Brenneck, Mike Herard, and James Fauntleroy II, and performed by The Carters.
- "Gatti" contains a sample of "Slunečnice Pro Vincenta Van Gogha", written by Petr Klapka and performed by Mahagon.

== Personnel ==
- David Rodriguez – recording (track 1)
- Travis Scott – recording (tracks 3, 5, 6)
- Rob Bisel – recording (tracks 3, 6)
- Flo – recording (track 5)
- Derek Anderson – recording (track 6)
- Nate Alford – recording (track 7)
- Colton Eatmon – engineering (track 4)
- Trevor Coulter – engineering (track 4)
- Jon Sher – engineering assistant (tracks 1, 3)
- Josh Harris – engineering assistant (track 1)
- Sean Solymar – engineering assistant (tracks 1, 7)
- Jimmy Cash – engineering assistant (tracks 1, 7), recording (track 3)
- Shawn Morenberg – engineering assistant (track 4)
- Harmony Korine – artwork (all tracks)
- Mike Dean – mixing (all tracks), mastering (all tracks)

== Charts ==
=== Weekly charts ===
Chart (2020)	Peak position
Australian Albums (ARIA)	5
Austrian Albums (Ö3 Austria)	5
Belgian Albums (Ultratop Flanders)	19
Belgian Albums (Ultratop Wallonia)	33
Canadian Albums (Billboard)	1
Danish Albums (Hitlisten)	6
Finnish Albums (Suomen virallinen lista)	8
French Albums (SNEP)	34
German Albums (Offizielle Top 100)	22
Italian Albums (FIMI)	21
New Zealand Albums (RMNZ)	5
Norwegian Albums (VG-lista)	1
Swedish Albums (Sverigetopplistan)	10
Swiss Albums (Schweizer Hitparade)	6
UK Compilation Albums (Official Charts)	4
UK R&B Albums (Official Charts)	37
US Billboard 200	1
US Top R&B/Hip-Hop Albums (Billboard)	1

=== Year-end charts ===
Chart (2020)	Position
Belgian Albums (Ultratop Flanders)	98
Belgian Albums (Ultratop Wallonia)	162
Canadian Albums (Billboard)	31
French Albums (SNEP)	149
US Billboard 200	39
US Top R&B/Hip-Hop Albums (Billboard)	26

Chart (2021)	Position
Icelandic Albums (Tónlistinn)	85

== Certifications ==
Region	Certification	Certified units/sales
Canada (Music Canada)	Gold	40,000^{‡}
Denmark (IFPI Danmark)	Gold	10,000^{‡}
France (SNEP)	Gold	100,000^{‡}
Italy (FIMI)	Gold	25,000^{‡}
New Zealand (RMNZ)	Gold	7,500^{‡}
Poland (ZPAV)	Gold	10,000^{‡}
United Kingdom (BPI)	Gold	100,000^{‡}
^{‡} Sales+streaming figures based on certification alone.
