= Give No Fxk =

2020 single by Migos featuring Travis Scott and Young Thug

Single by Migos featuring Young Thug and Travis Scott
- Released: February 14, 2020
- Genre: Trap
- Length: 3:44
- Label: Quality Control; Motown
- Songwriter(s): Quavious Marshall; Kirshnik Ball; Kiari Cephus; Jacques Webster II; Jeffery Williams; Daryl McPherson; Shane Lindstrom; Jonah Yano; Joseph L'Étranger
- Producer(s): DJ Durel; Murda Beatz; Yano; L'Étranger

Migos singles chronology
"Stripper Bowl" (2019)	"Give No Fxk" (2020)	"Taco Tuesday" (2020)

Travis Scott singles chronology
"Highest in the Room (Remix)" (2019)	"Give No Fxk" (2020)	"Out West" (2020)

Young Thug singles chronology
"Yell Oh" (2020)	"Give No Fxk" (2020)	"Out West" (2020)

Music video
- "Give No Fxk" on YouTube

"Give No Fxk" (pronounced "give no fuck") is a song by American hip hop trio Migos featuring fellow American rappers Travis Scott and Young Thug, released on February 14, 2020. The song originally debuted live in 2019 during Travis Scott's Astroworld Festival. Days before the single's release, its cover art and a snippet of the track were teased on Instagram by Quavo of Migos.

== Composition ==
"Give No Fxk" is in the key of C♯ minor at 146 BPM.

== Music video ==
The music video was released on February 14, 2020, via YouTube. Directed by Migos member Quavo and Kazakh-Russian filmmaker Aisultan Seitov, the visual has been described as "dystopic" and "psychedelic".

== Charts ==
Chart (2020)	Peak position
Canada (Canadian Hot 100)	60
France (SNEP)	164
Ireland (IRMA)	78
New Zealand Hot Singles (RMNZ)	13
Sweden Heatseeker (Sverigetopplistan)	19
Switzerland (Schweizer Hitparade)	45
UK Singles (OCC)	96
US Billboard Hot 100	48
US Hot R&B/Hip-Hop Songs (Billboard)	19
US Rhythmic (Billboard)	13
