= 2000 Excursion =

Single by Travis Scott, Sheck Wes, and Don Toliver

from the album JackBoys 2
- Released: July 8, 2025
- Genre: Trap
- Length: 3:42
- Label: Cactus Jack; Epic
- Songwriters: Jacques Webster II; Khadimou Fall; Caleb Toliver; Joseph Thornalley; Ronald LaTour, Jr.; John Julian
- Producers: Vegyn; Cardo; Johnny Juliano

Travis Scott singles chronology
"TaTaTa" (2025)	"2000 Excursion" (2025)	"Dumbo" (2025)

Sheck Wes singles chronology
"ILMB" (2025)	"2000 Excursion" (2025)

Don Toliver singles chronology
"FWU" (2025)	"2000 Excursion" (2025)	"Cannonball" (2025)

Music video
- "2000 Excursion" on YouTube

"2000 Excursion" is a song by American rappers and Cactus Jack Records labelmates Travis Scott, Sheck Wes, and Don Toliver. It was surprise released through Cactus Jack and Epic Records as the second single from JackBoys (the artist name for Cactus Jack) and Scott's collaborative compilation album, JackBoys 2, on July 8, 2025. The three artists wrote the song with producers Vegyn, Cardo, and Johnny Juliano. Containing a sample of the 2010 single "Power" by fellow American rapper and Scott's mentor, Kanye West, its title refers to the heavy-duty full-size SUV Ford Excursion.

== Composition and lyrics ==
The song was first teased in May 2025, with a placeholder title of "B&B". In a ranking of all songs from the album, Billboard's Michael Saponara saw "2000 Excursion" as the tenth best song, recognizing that Scott is "clearing the lane for Sheck Wes and Don Toliver to shine" and added that "La Flame and Cardo on the beat is never going to be a miss, and who doesn’t love a Ye "Power" flip with Mike Dean's tonic synths".

== Music video ==
The official music video for "2000 Excursion" was released on Scott's YouTube channel on July 8, 2025. It primarily takes place in Houston, Texas, which is his and Toliver's hometown. The video sees the two and Wes driving in supercharged cars and Ford trucks, while they also participate in a Formula One race.

== Charts ==
Chart performance for "2000 Excursion"
Chart (2025)	Peak position
Australia Hip Hop/R&B (ARIA)	16
Canada Hot 100 (Billboard)	78
Global 200 (Billboard)	101
New Zealand Hot Singles (RMNZ)	9
UK Hip Hop/R&B (Official Charts)	34
US Billboard Hot 100	72
US Hot R&B/Hip-Hop Songs (Billboard)	24
