= Knock Knock (SoFaygo song) =

2019 single by SoFaygo

Single by SoFaygo

from the album Angelic 7
- Released: August 4, 2019
- Recorded: 2019
- Length: 2:19
- Label: Cactus Jack
- Songwriters: Andre Burt Jr.; Tyler-Justin Sharpe
- Producer: Lil Tecca

SoFaygo singles chronology
"One Up!" (2019)	"Knock Knock" (2019)	"Collect" (2019)

Music video
- "Knock Knock" on YouTube

"Knock Knock" is a song by American rapper SoFaygo, released on August 4, 2019, as the lead single from his second mixtape Angelic 7 (2020). It was written by SoFaygo and Lil Tecca, who produced the song. A sleeper hit, it gained traction on the video-sharing app TikTok in February 2021 and became SoFaygo's breakthrough song.

== Background and composition ==
In 2019, SoFaygo recorded the song on his computer via GarageBand in 50 minutes. Lil Tecca, who produced the beat, had connected with Faygo on the Internet. In regard to composing the song, SoFaygo stated "Writing-wise, production-wise, we just killed that shit. I didn't really realize how good of a song it was like at the time until it really aged and I really paid attention to how people reacted to it. A lot of people sleep on that song; it's my old sound."

A piano-driven song, "Knock Knock" serves as a warning of SoFaygo entering the music industry, with lyrics about catching his enemies off guard.

== Release and promotion ==
After the song was released on August 4, 2019, it would be teased on Triller and Twitter. Over the years, the song became widely used in videos on TikTok in 2021, leading to SoFaygo's rise to fame. It also garnered over 16 million streams on SoundCloud and 326 million streams on Spotify. The official music video was directed by Cole Bennett and premiered on May 3, 2021. It was inspired by the film Beetlejuice.

== Critical reception ==
DJ Booth commented on the song, "Faygo sings every line of 'Knock Knock' with the confidence and clarity of a pop star, but, like so many of the scene's creations, his vocals feel stitched together, rough around the edges. The beat, too, has that handmade quality—a see-sawing MIDI orchestra courtesy of Lil Tecca, an underrated producer whose credits run rampant through Faygo's corner of online rap." Natalie Maher of Elle included the song in her list "The Best Songs on Tiktok to Listen to in Full".

== Certifications and sales ==
Certifications for "Knock Knock"
Region	Certification	Certified units/sales
United States (RIAA)	Platinum	1,000,000^{‡}
^{‡} Sales+streaming figures based on certification alone.
