= Highest in the Room =

2019 single by Travis Scott

Single by Travis Scott
- Released: October 4, 2019
- Genre: Trap
- Length: 2:55
- Label: Cactus Jack; Epic
- Songwriters: Jacques Webster II; Ozan Yildirim; Nik Frascona; Michael Dean
- Producers: OZ; Nik D; Dean (co.)

Travis Scott singles chronology
"Antisocial" (2019)	"Highest in the Room" (2019)	"Take What You Want" (2019)

Music video
- "Highest in the Room" on YouTube

"Highest in the Room" (stylized in all caps) is a song by American rapper Travis Scott. It was released as a single on October 4, 2019. It was released in a variety of formats, including on 7-inch vinyl, cassette and as a CD single. In its first week, it debuted atop the Billboard Hot 100, for the chart dated October 19, 2019, becoming Scott's second US number-one single, following "Sicko Mode". A remix featuring Spanish singer Rosalía and American rapper Lil Baby was released on December 27, 2019, and featured on Scott and other Cactus Jack members' compilation album JackBoys (2019) on the same day, while the original release remains off the compilation. The remix version was released to Italian contemporary hit radio on January 7, 2020. The song received a nomination for Best Melodic Rap Performance at the 63rd Annual Grammy Awards.

== Background ==
The song was first used in Scott's girlfriend Kylie Jenner's "Kybrows" commercial on April 29, 2019, before Scott debuted the song during his set at the Rolling Loud festival in Miami on May 10–12, 2019. On August 31, 2019, Scott played a portion of the song at a concert that included a verse from Lil Baby, but was ultimately cut in the final version because Scott wanted to express the breakup with himself and Jenner on his own. The demo version featuring Baby leaked on December 24, 2019. Baby's verse was on the remix of the song, which is on the compilation album JackBoys. However, the original version of "Highest in the Room" did not make it onto the album.

== Promotion ==
Scott officially announced the track's release through social media on September 30, posting three covers for the song as well as a pre-order link and captioning the post "See u on the 4th".

A music video was released on October 3, 2019, on YouTube, directed by Dave Meyers and Travis Scott himself, while it was produced by Nathan Scherrer, Randy Donaldson, and Sam Lecca.

== Commercial performance ==
"Highest in the Room" debuted at number one on the Billboard Hot 100 on the issue dated October 19, 2019, becoming Scott's second number-one single on the chart (after 2018's "Sicko Mode"), his first number-one single on its first week on the chart, and 35th single to debut at the number one position in the chart's history. "Highest in the Room" debuted atop the Streaming Songs chart with 59 million streams and debuted at number two on the Digital Songs chart with 51,000 downloads. The song fell to number six the following week on October 26, 2019. It later returned to the top 10 on the issue dated January 11, 2020 at number eight, partly charged by sales from the remix featuring Rosalia and Lil Baby. Elsewhere, in Greece the song charted at number one. The UK Singles Chart number two on 17 October.

== Personnel ==
Credits adapted from Spotify.

- Travis Scott – vocalist, songwriting
- OZ – production, songwriting
- Nik D – production, songwriting
- ROSALÍA – songwriting
- Mike Dean – co-production, mixing, mastering
- Sean Solymar – engineering assistant
- Jimmy Cash – engineering assistant

== Charts ==
=== Weekly charts ===
Chart (2019–2020)	Peak position
Australia (ARIA)	3
Austria (Ö3 Austria Top 40)	3
Belgium (Ultratop 50 Flanders)	30
Belgium (Ultratop 50 Wallonia)	49
Canada Hot 100 (Billboard)	1
Czech Republic Singles Digital (ČNS IFPI)	4
Denmark (Tracklisten)	4
Finland (Suomen virallinen lista)	6
France (SNEP)	11
Germany (GfK)	8
Global 200 (Billboard)	83
Greece International (IFPI)	1
Hungary (Single Top 40)	7
Hungary (Stream Top 40)	2
Ireland (IRMA)	3
Italy (FIMI)	11
Latvia (LAIPA)	1
Lithuania (AGATA)	2
Malaysia (RIM)	10
Netherlands (Single Top 100)	14
New Zealand (Recorded Music NZ)	2
Norway (VG-lista)	2
Portugal (AFP)	2
Romania Airplay (Media Forest)	59
Scottish Singles Sales (Official Charts)	44
Singapore (RIAS)	12
Slovakia Singles Digital (ČNS IFPI)	2
Spain (Promusicae)	48
Sweden (Sverigetopplistan)	6
Switzerland (Schweizer Hitparade)	2
UK Singles (Official Charts)	2
US Billboard Hot 100	1
US Hot R&B/Hip-Hop Songs (Billboard)	1
US Pop Airplay (Billboard)	21
US Rhythmic Airplay (Billboard)	1
US Rolling Stone Top 100	1

=== Year-end charts ===
Chart (2019)	Position
Canada (Canadian Hot 100)	99
Latvia (LAIPA)	32
Portugal (AFP)	76
US Hot R&B/Hip-Hop Songs (Billboard)	65
US Rolling Stone Top 100	65

Chart (2020)	Position
Australia (ARIA)	63
Canada (Canadian Hot 100)	49
Denmark (Tracklisten)	86
France (SNEP)	94
Hungary (Stream Top 40)	46
Italy (FIMI)	95
New Zealand (Recorded Music NZ)	50
Switzerland (Schweizer Hitparade)	31
UK Singles (OCC)	97
US Billboard Hot 100	45
US Hot R&B/Hip-Hop Songs (Billboard)	23
US Rhythmic (Billboard)	18

Chart (2021)	Position
Global 200 (Billboard)	186
Portugal (AFP)	89

== Certifications ==
Region	Certification	Certified units/sales
Australia (ARIA)	3× Platinum	210,000^{‡}
Austria (IFPI Austria)	Platinum	30,000^{‡}
Belgium (BRMA)	Gold	20,000^{‡}
Brazil (Pro-Música Brasil)	3× Diamond	480,000^{‡}
Canada (Music Canada)	5× Platinum	400,000^{‡}
Denmark (IFPI Danmark)	2× Platinum	180,000^{‡}
France (SNEP)	Diamond	333,333^{‡}
Germany (BVMI)	Platinum	400,000^{‡}
Italy (FIMI)	2× Platinum	140,000^{‡}
Mexico (AMPROFON)	Diamond+Platinum	360,000^{‡}
New Zealand (RMNZ)	5× Platinum	150,000^{‡}
Poland (ZPAV)	3× Platinum	150,000^{‡}
Portugal (AFP)	7× Platinum	70,000^{‡}
Spain (Promusicae)	Platinum	60,000^{‡}
Switzerland (IFPI Switzerland)	2× Platinum	40,000^{‡}
United Kingdom (BPI)	2× Platinum	1,200,000^{‡}
United States (RIAA)	9× Platinum	9,000,000^{‡}
Streaming
Greece (IFPI Greece)	Diamond	10,000,000^{†}
Sweden (GLF)	Platinum	8,000,000^{†}
^{‡} Sales+streaming figures based on certification alone.^{†} Streaming-only figures based on certification alone.

== Release history ==
Region	Date	Format	Label	Ref.
Various	October 4, 2019	Digital download; streaming	Epic	
Various	October 4, 2019	7-inch single; cassette; CD single	Epic	

== Rosalía and Lil Baby remix ==
"Highest in the Room" (remix)

Single by Travis Scott featuring Rosalía and Lil Baby

from the album JackBoys
- Released: January 7, 2020
- Genre: Trap; flamenco; R&B
- Length: 4:05
- Label: Cactus Jack; Epic
- Songwriters: Jacques Webster; Rosalía Vila; Dominique Jones; Ozan Yildirim; Nik Frascona; Michael Dean
- Producers: OZ; Nik D; Dean (co.)

Travis Scott singles chronology
"Hot" (remix) (2019)	"Highest in the Room" (remix) (2020)	"Give No Fxk" (2020)

Rosalía singles chronology
"A Palé" (2019)	"Highest in the Room" (remix) (2019)	"Juro Que" (2020)

Lil Baby singles chronology
"Woah" (2019)	"Highest in the Room" (remix) (2019)	"U Played" (2020)

A remix featuring Spanish singer Rosalía and American rapper Lil Baby was released on December 27, 2019. It was the first track on Scott and other Cactus Jack members' album, JackBoys, which was released on the same day. Originally, Lil Baby was supposed to be on the original song, but his verse was cut for unknown reasons. The remix version received a radio release on January 7, 2020.

=== Charts ===
Chart (2020)	Peak position
Italy (FIMI)	15
New Zealand (Recorded Music NZ)	9
Spain (PROMUSICAE)	19
US Rolling Stone Top 100	17

=== Certifications ===
Region	Certification	Certified units/sales
Brazil (Pro-Música Brasil)	Platinum	40,000^{‡}
Mexico (AMPROFON)	Platinum	60,000^{‡}
New Zealand (RMNZ)	Gold	15,000^{‡}
Spain (Promusicae)	Gold	30,000^{‡}
^{‡} Sales+streaming figures based on certification alone.

=== Release history ===
Region	Date	Format	Label	Ref.
Italy	January 7, 2020	Contemporary hit radio	Sony Music Italy	
