= TaTaTa =

2025 single by Burna Boy featuring Travis Scott

Single by Burna Boy featuring Travis Scott

from the album No Sign of Weakness
- Language: English; Yoruba
- Released: 21 May 2025
- Genre: Afrobeats
- Length: 2:31
- Label: Atlantic Records
- Songwriters: Damini Ogulu; Jacques Webster II; Onome Ojoboh; Douglas Ford
- Producer: Chillz

Burna Boy singles chronology
"Sweet Love" (2025)	"TaTaTa" (2025)	"Don't Let Me Drown" (2025)

Travis Scott singles chronology
"ILMB" (2025)	"TaTaTa" (2025)	"2000 Excursion" (2025)

Music video
- "TaTaTa" on YouTube

"TaTaTa" is a song by Nigerian singer Burna Boy featuring American rapper and singer Travis Scott. It was released on 21 May 2025 through Atlantic Records as the fourth and final single from Burna Boy's eighth studio album, No Sign of Weakness. The two artists wrote the song with producer Chillz and alongside Dougie F.

== Composition ==
"TaTaTa" is an upbeat song that sees Burna Boy continuing his usual style of music. Before Travis Scott's verse starts, an audio sample of a line that he said from his DJ set at the Fresh Touch nightclub in Paris, France, on January 22, 2025, plays: "You cállate la boca and shake that culo now!". Joyce Li of Hypebeast felt that his feature on the song "demonstrates his versatility and understanding of the Afrobeats sound, further solidifying the growing cross-genre collaborations in global music".

== Charts ==
Chart performance for "TaTaTa"
Chart (2025)	Peak position
Germany Urban (Deutsche Black Charts)	13
New Zealand Hot Singles (RMNZ)	5
Nigeria (TurnTable Top 100)	5
Suriname (Nationale Top 40)	6
Switzerland (Schweizer Hitparade)	75
UK Singles (Official Charts)	84
UK Afrobeats (OCC)	2
UK Hip Hop/R&B (Official Charts)	21
US Afrobeats Songs (Billboard)	2

== Certifications ==
Certifications for "TaTaTa"
Region	Certification	Certified units/sales
Nigeria (TCSN)	Platinum	100,000^{‡}
^{‡} Sales+streaming figures based on certification alone.
