= Omertà (Drake song) =

Single by Drake

from the EP The Best in the World Pack
- Released: June 15, 2019
- Recorded: 2019
- Genre: Hip hop
- Length: 3:40
- Label: Frozen Moments; Republic; OVO
- Songwriters: Aubrey Graham; Ozan Yildirim; Eyobed Getachew; Dominik Patrzek; Matthew Samuels
- Producers: OZ; EY; Deats (Note: Denotes a co-producer)

Drake singles chronology
"No Guidance" (2019)	"Omertà" (2019)	"Money in the Grave" (2019)

"Omertà" is a song by Canadian musician Drake. It was released on June 15, 2019, as the first single from his third EP, The Best in the World Pack (2018).

== Background ==
Drake posted the cover of both songs on his social media on June 14, 2019. After the NBA Championship win of the Toronto Raptors, the songs served as a "celebration release". Drake was named Global Ambassador of the team and was previously seen attending the 2019 NBA Finals.

== Personnel ==
Credits adapted from Tidal.

- Noah "40" Shebib – mixing
- Harley Arsenault – mixing assistant
- Greg Moffet – mixing assistant
- Les "Bates" Bateman – engineering
- Lindsay Warner – engineering

== Charts ==
Chart (2019)	Peak position
Australia (ARIA)	69
Canada Hot 100 (Billboard)	8
Greece International Digital Singles (IFPI)	98
Ireland (IRMA)	44
New Zealand Hot Singles (RMNZ)	12
UK Singles (Official Charts)	33
UK Hip Hop/R&B (Official Charts)	17
US Billboard Hot 100	35
US Hot R&B/Hip-Hop Songs (Billboard)	14
US Rolling Stone 100	49
