= SoFaygo =

American rapper (born 2001)

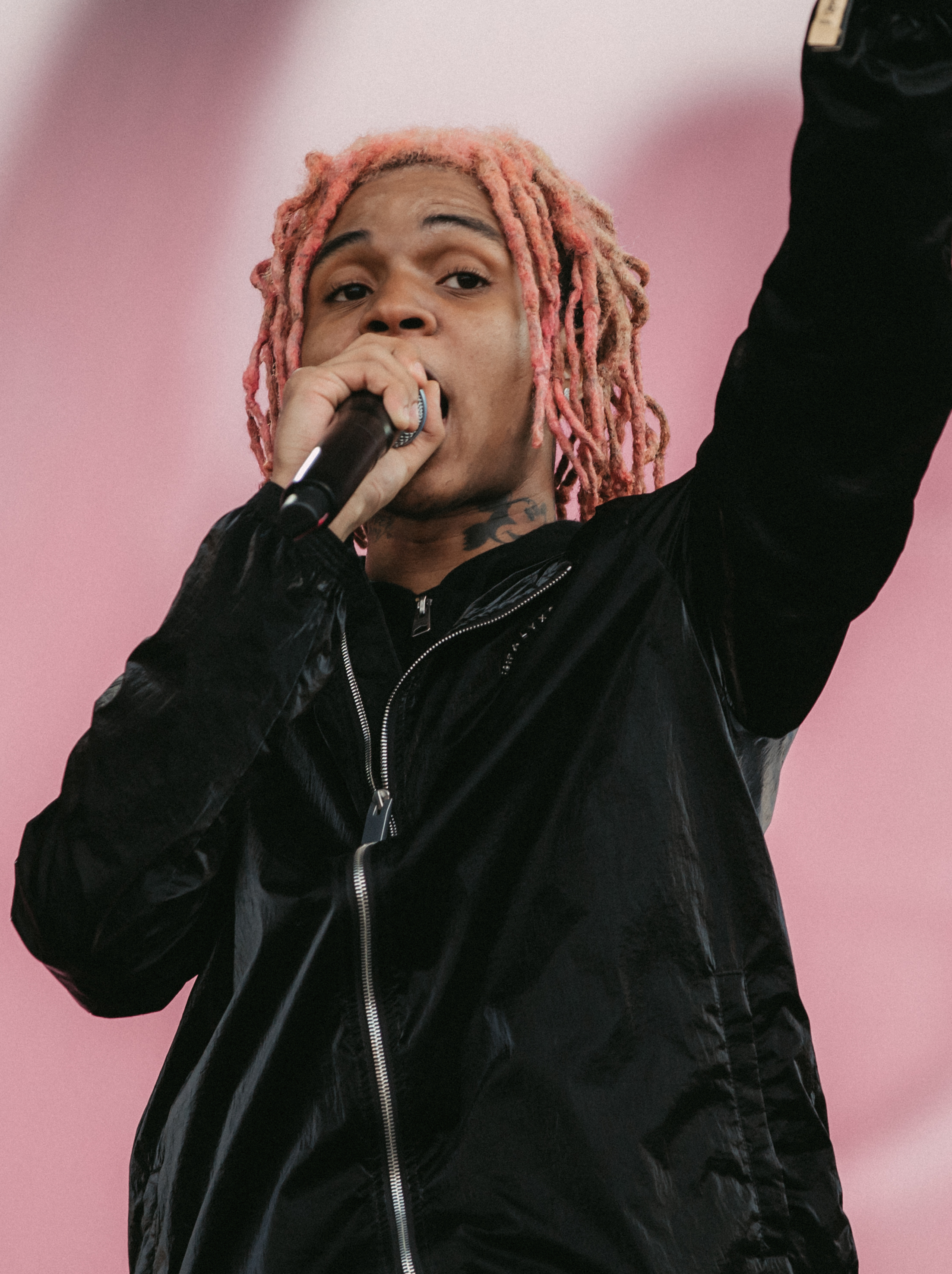
- SoFaygo performing in 2022

Background information
- Also known as: Faygo; BabyJack; Lil Go; Go; Trvllinese; Chief Runna; GoStar General; Neezy; Lil Faygo; Fay
- Born: Andre Dontrel Burt Jr. October 3, 2001 (age 25); Grand Rapids, Michigan, US
- Origin: Atlanta, Georgia, US
- Genres: Trap; rage; pop rap; plugg
- Occupations: Rapper; singer; songwriter
- Years active: 2015–present
- Label: Cactus Jack
- Management: SinceThe80s
- Website: imsofaygo.com

Andre Dontrel Burt Jr. (born October 3, 2001), known professionally as SoFaygo (formerly stylized as $ofaygo), is an American rapper and singer. His 2019 single, "Knock Knock", went viral on TikTok in late 2020 before receiving platinum certification by the Recording Industry Association of America (RIAA). The following year, he guest appeared on Trippie Redd's song "MP5", which marked his first entry on the Billboard Hot 100. He signed with fellow rapper Travis Scott's Cactus Jack Records to release his debut studio album, Pink Heartz (2022).

== Career ==
=== 2015–2019: Beginnings ===
Burt recorded his first song at nine years old in a friend's basement. He began to pursue music more seriously in his teenage years, while attending Etowah High School. Burt went by the stage name Trvllinese prior to releasing the EP We Are Aliens in 2018.

Burt released his debut mixtape War in 2019. Soon after, he began amassing a local fanbase. This popularity led him to be discovered by Taz Taylor, the founder of the record label Internet Money, who offered to sign him to the label. He traveled to Los Angeles to consider this offer, but declined. He had already befriended rapper Lil Tecca, and the two began writing songs together.

=== 2020–2022: "Knock Knock" and Pink Heartz ===
In February 2021, Burt had signed to Travis Scott's label Cactus Jack Records, which includes other popular rappers such as Sheck Wes and Don Toliver. In June 2021, Burt appeared on Genius's web series Open Mic to perform his single "Knock Knock".

On August 20, 2021, Burt was featured on Trippie Redd's album, Trip at Knight, on the song "MP5". On September 1, 2021, he released the song "Let's Lose Our Minds", being the lead single for Pink Heartz and his first release under Cactus Jack since his signing. On October 8, SoFaygo was featured on labelmate Don Toliver's album Life of a Don, on the track "Smoke".

Just a month later, on July 15, 2022, Burt's reportedly leaked EP Babyjack appeared exclusively on SoundCloud, under the account 'prettyboyarchive'. On October 17, 2022, four songs from his debut album Pink Heartz were released, with a feature from Ken Carson. He announced the November 11 release date for the album on the same day.

=== 2023–present: GO+, JackBoys 2, and MANIA ===
On June 14, 2023, Burt released an EP called GO+; the year after that, he released the songs "Precision" featuring Don Toliver and "Life So Crazy"; and nearing the end of 2024, SoFaygo released a SoundCloud-exclusive EP called Pressure.

In 2024, Burt supported Lil Tecca's "Hvn on Earth" tour, alongside Tana and Chow Lee.

On July 13, 2025, Burt made two appearances on JackBoys 2, marking his first collaboration with label head Travis Scott.

On Halloween, October 31, 2025, Burt announced that his mixtape Mania would be released on November 21, 2025. On November 21, Faygo would keep his word and release the mixtape to all platforms. The mixtape contains 19 tracks, with features from Kaash Paige and Hardrock.

== Artistry ==
Burt's main influences include other rappers such as Drake, Travis Scott, Chief Keef, Lil Wayne, Chris Brown, Playboi Carti, and Lil Uzi Vert.

== Discography ==
=== Studio albums ===
Title	Album details	Peak chart positions
Title	Album details	US Heat.
Pink Heartz	Released: November 11, 2022; Label: Cactus Jack; Formats: Digital download, streaming	4
Mania	Released: November 21, 2025; Label: Cactus Jack; Formats: Digital download, streaming, vinyl	—

=== Collaborative albums ===
Title	Album details	Peak chart positions				
Title	Album details	US	AUS	BEL (FL)	CAN	NZ
JackBoys 2 (as part of JackBoys)	Released: July 13, 2025; Label: Cactus Jack, Epic; Formats: Digital download, streaming, CD, LP	1	3	9	4	5

=== Mixtapes ===
Title	Details
War	Released: June 30, 2019; Label: Self-released; Formats: Digital download, streaming
Angelic 7	Released: January 10, 2020; Label: Self-released; Formats: Digital download, streaming
After Me	Released: December 17, 2020; Label: Self-released; Formats: Digital download, streaming
BabyJack	Released: July 14, 2022; Label: Self-released; Formats: Digital download, streaming

=== EPs ===
Title	Details
Goonland	Released: 2018; Label: Self-released; Formats: Digital download, streaming
We Are Aliens	Released: 2018; Label: Self-released; Formats: Digital download, streaming
Delineation	Released: March 18, 2019; Label: Self-released; Formats: Digital download, streaming
Hostility	Released: October 26, 2019; Label: Self-released; Formats: Digital download, streaming
4U	Released: March 7, 2020; Label: Self-released; Formats: Digital download, streaming
Web	Released: May 17, 2020; Label: Self-released; Formats: Digital download, streaming
B4Pink	Released: June 14, 2022; Label: Cactus Jack; Formats: Digital download, streaming
Go+	Released: June 14, 2023; Label: Cactus Jack; Formats: Digital download, streaming
Pressure	Released: November 3, 2024; Label: Self-released; Formats: Digital download, streaming

=== Charted and certified singles ===
Title	Year	Peak chart positions				Certifications	Album
Title	Year	US	US R&B/HH	NZ Hot	WW	Certifications	Album
"Knock Knock"	2019	—	—	—	—	RIAA: Platinum	Angelic 7
"MP5" (with Trippie Redd)	2021	86	31	19	155		Trip at Knight
"Satellite" (with Chase B and Don Toliver)	2025	—	—	13	—		Be Very Afraid (Vol. 1)

=== Other charted songs ===
Title	Year	Peak chart positions		Album
Title	Year	US Bub.	US R&B/HH	Album
"MM3"	2025	4	37	JackBoys 2
"Contest" (with Travis Scott)	2025	13	46	JackBoys 2
