= Travis Scott: Look Mom I Can Fly =

2019 documentary film

- Film poster
- Directed by: White Trash Tyler
- Written by: Josh Giddy
- Produced by: Travis Scott; Kylie Jenner; David Stromberg; Angus Wall
- Starring: Travis Scott
- Distributed by: Netflix
- Release date: August 28, 2019
- Running time: 84 minutes
- Country: United States
- Language: English

Travis Scott: Look Mom I Can Fly is a 2019 documentary directed by White Trash Tyler, produced by Travis Scott, Kylie Jenner, David Stromberg and Angus Wall and starring Scott. The documentary explores Travis's rise to fame in 2018 to where he created and released his third studio album Astroworld. He takes his audience through a roller coaster of events which lead him to the point where he is today. The documentary includes footage of live concerts and performances, time spent with Scott's family, collaborations in the studio to prepare his album, fans and their perspectives of how their lives were changed by him, and flashbacks to his childhood which shaped him.

It was released August 28, 2019 on Netflix.

== Cast ==
- Travis Scott
- Chase B
- Stormi Webster
- Kylie Jenner
- Mike Dean
- Don Toliver
- Sheck Wes
- Jacques Bermon Webster, Sr.
- Kanye West
- Wanda Webster
