= Money in the Grave =

Single by Drake featuring Rick Ross

from the EP The Best in the World Pack
- Released: June 15, 2019
- Recorded: 2019
- Genre: Hip hop
- Length: 3:25
- Label: Frozen Moments; Republic; OVO
- Songwriters: Aubrey Graham; William Roberts; Ljay Currie; Cydney Dade; Anton Joergensen
- Producers: Cydney Christine; Currie; Asoteric

Drake singles chronology
"Omertà" (2019)	"Money in the Grave" (2019)	"Gold Roses" (2019)

Rick Ross singles chronology
"Big Tyme" (2019)	"Money in the Grave" (2019)	"Act a Fool" (2019)

"Money in the Grave" is a song by Canadian musician Drake. It was released on June 15, 2019, as a single from his third EP, The Best in the World Pack (2019). The song features vocals from American rapper Rick Ross.

== Background ==
After the NBA Championship win of the Toronto Raptors, the songs served as a "celebration release". Drake was named Global Ambassador of the team and was previously seen attending the 2019 NBA Finals.

== Production ==
The song features vocals from American rapper Rick Ross.

== Release ==
Money in the Grave was released on the Frozen Moments, Republic and OVO labels on June 15, 2019, as a single from Drake's third EP, The Best in the World Pack (2019).

== Commercial performance ==
In the United States, the song debuted at number seven on the US Billboard Hot 100, making it Drake's 35th top-ten song and Rick Ross's second top ten on the chart.

== Awards and nominations ==
Year	Ceremony	Category	Result	Ref.
2019	BET Hip Hop Awards	Sweet 16: Best Featured Verse	Nominated	

== Personnel ==
Credits adapted from Tidal.

- Noah "40" Shebib – mixing
- Harley Arsenault – mixing assistant
- Greg Moffet – mixing assistant
- Les "Bates" Bateman – engineering
- Lindsay Warner – engineering

== Charts ==
=== Weekly charts ===
Chart (2019)	Peak position
Australia (ARIA)	7
Austria (Ö3 Austria Top 40)	48
Belgium (Ultratip Bubbling Under Flanders)	3
Belgium (Ultratip Bubbling Under Wallonia)	18
Canada Hot 100 (Billboard)	5
Czech Republic Singles Digital (ČNS IFPI)	36
Denmark (Tracklisten)	29
Estonia (Eesti Ekspress)	23
France (SNEP)	113
Germany (GfK)	57
Greece International Digital Singles (IFPI)	5
Hungary (Stream Top 40)	13
Ireland (IRMA)	18
Netherlands (Single Top 100)	38
New Zealand (Recorded Music NZ)	7
Norway (VG-lista)	32
Portugal (AFP)	28
Slovakia Singles Digital (ČNS IFPI)	18
Sweden (Sverigetopplistan)	68
Switzerland (Schweizer Hitparade)	30
UK Singles (Official Charts)	13
UK Hip Hop/R&B (Official Charts)	5
US Billboard Hot 100	7
US Hot R&B/Hip-Hop Songs (Billboard)	3
US Rhythmic Airplay (Billboard)	1
US Rolling Stone 100	3

=== Year-end charts ===
Chart (2019)	Position
Australia (ARIA)	72
Canada (Canadian Hot 100)	26
Latvia (LAIPA)	69
Portugal (AFP)	173
US Billboard Hot 100	34
US Hot R&B/Hip-Hop Songs (Billboard)	15
US Rhythmic (Billboard)	9

== Certifications ==
Region	Certification	Certified units/sales
Australia (ARIA)	4× Platinum	280,000^{‡}
Brazil (Pro-Música Brasil)	Diamond	160,000^{‡}
Denmark (IFPI Danmark)	Platinum	90,000^{‡}
France (SNEP)	Gold	100,000^{‡}
Italy (FIMI)	Gold	35,000^{‡}
New Zealand (RMNZ)	2× Platinum	60,000^{‡}
Poland (ZPAV)	Gold	25,000^{‡}
Portugal (AFP)	Platinum	10,000^{‡}
United Kingdom (BPI)	Platinum	600,000^{‡}
United States (RIAA)	6× Platinum	6,000,000^{‡}
^{‡} Sales+streaming figures based on certification alone.
