= Mo Bamba (song) =

2017 single by Sheck Wes

Single by Sheck Wes

from the album Mudboy
- Released: June 16, 2017
- Recorded: 2017
- Genre: Trap; hardcore hip hop
- Length: 3:01 (single version); 3:04 (album version)
- Label: Cactus Jack; GOOD; Interscope
- Songwriters: Khadimou Fall; Jerry Cruz; Denzel Baptise; David Biral
- Producers: 16yrold; Take a Daytrip

Sheck Wes singles chronology
| "Live SheckWes Die SheckWes" (2017) | "Mo Bamba" (2017) | "Do That" (2018) |

Music video
- "Mo Bamba" on YouTube

"Mo Bamba" is a song by American rapper Sheck Wes. A sleeper hit that achieved mainstream success despite limited promotion, it was produced by Take a Daytrip and 16yrold. The song was independently released on music streaming site SoundCloud by 18 year old Wes in 2017, and became a word of mouth sensation without record label or radio support, reaching number six on the US Billboard Hot 100 chart. The song later served as a single from Wes' debut studio album, Mudboy.

== Background ==
The song is named after basketball player Mo Bamba, who most recently played for the Utah Jazz in the NBA. The then-Texas Longhorn player grew up with Sheck Wes in his home town Harlem, New York neighborhood, spending some of their childhoods together.

Producers 16yrold and Take a Daytrip consisting of Denzel Baptise and David Biral, who had met online, collaborated on the track's beat and composition. 16yrold invited Wes to record in the studio with them. Wes recorded the majority of the song in one take, with additional ad-libs recorded afterwards.

Baptise of Take a Daytrip looped the beat as Wes recorded his vocals. The beat cutting off at the 1:38 minute mark of the song was the result of the laptop used to record Wes’ vocals freezing. This caused concern among the producers who feared that the song would be ruined because the entire song up until that point had been recorded in one take without any issues. At the 1:40 minute mark of the song, someone can be heard in the background saying "whoa". Wes shouting out, "Oh! Fuck! Shit! Bitch!", was his actual reaction to the beat freezing by accident. Shortly after, the beat unfroze as Wes proceeded to record a new verse on the spot.

== Music video ==
The song's music video was released on January 30, 2018, via YouTube and was directed by White Trash Tyler, Nick Walker and Wes himself. It is a music video in black and white and finds Wes on Kingdome, an outdoor basketball court in Harlem, New York.

== Usage in media ==
=== In sports ===
The song has gained widespread popularity at sporting events, particularly at college football games. The song is primarily used to help hype up the home fans and raise the volume inside the stadium. During a highly anticipated sellout 2019 game at Beaver Stadium, the song was used during then ranked #16 Michigan Wolverines first possession. Penn State Nittany Lions fans plus the song made the stadium so loud that Michigan was forced to use a timeout to avoid a delay of game penalty.

The song can be heard in the video games NBA 2K19 and EA Sports College Football 25.

== Personnel ==
Credits adapted from The New York Times.

=== Artist ===
- Sheck Wes – vocals

=== Production ===
- 16yrold – production
- Take a Daytrip – production, recording, mixing, mastering

== Charts ==
=== Weekly charts ===
Weekly chart performance
| Chart (2018–2019) | Peak position |
|---|---|
| Australia (ARIA) | 29 |
| Belgium (Ultratip Bubbling Under Flanders) | 22 |
| Canada Hot 100 (Billboard) | 5 |
| Czech Republic Singles Digital (ČNS IFPI) | 69 |
| France (SNEP) | 147 |
| Greece International Digital Singles (IFPI) | 8 |
| Ireland (IRMA) | 25 |
| Lithuania (AGATA) | 20 |
| Netherlands (Single Top 100) | 87 |
| New Zealand (Recorded Music NZ) | 16 |
| Portugal (AFP) | 34 |
| Scotland Singles (Official Charts) | 87 |
| Slovakia Singles Digital (ČNS IFPI) | 54 |
| Sweden (Sverigetopplistan) | 68 |
| Switzerland (Schweizer Hitparade) | 56 |
| UK Singles (Official Charts) | 26 |
| UK Hip Hop/R&B (Official Charts) | 10 |
| US Billboard Hot 100 | 6 |
| US Hot R&B/Hip-Hop Songs (Billboard) | 2 |
| US Rhythmic (Billboard) | 10 |

=== Year-end charts ===
Annual chart rankings
| Chart (2018) | Position |
|---|---|
| US Hot R&B/Hip-Hop Songs (Billboard) | 59 |
| US Streaming Songs (Billboard) | 74 |
| Chart (2019) | Position |
| Canada (Canadian Hot 100) | 33 |
| Portugal (AFP) | 158 |
| US Billboard Hot 100 | 49 |
| US Hot R&B/Hip-Hop Songs (Billboard) | 26 |
| US Rolling Stone Top 100 | 80 |

== Certifications ==
| Region | Certification | Certified units/sales |
|---|---|---|
| Brazil (Pro-Música Brasil) | Platinum | 60,000^{‡} |
| Canada (Music Canada) | 3× Platinum | 240,000^{‡} |
| Denmark (IFPI Danmark) | Gold | 45,000^{‡} |
| France (SNEP) | Platinum | 200,000^{‡} |
| Italy (FIMI) | Gold | 35,000^{‡} |
| New Zealand (RMNZ) | 2× Platinum | 60,000^{‡} |
| Poland (ZPAV) | Platinum | 50,000^{‡} |
| Portugal (AFP) | Platinum | 10,000^{‡} |
| Spain (Promusicae) | Gold | 30,000^{‡} |
| United Kingdom (BPI) | Platinum | 600,000^{‡} |
| United States (RIAA) | 5× Platinum | 5,000,000^{‡} |
^{‡} Sales+streaming figures based on certification alone.
