= Gang Gang (JackBoys and Sheck Wes song) =

2019 song by JackBoys and Sheck Wes

Song by JackBoys and Sheck Wes

from the album JackBoys
- Released: December 27, 2019
- Length: 4:04
- Label: Epic; Cactus Jack
- Songwriters: Caleb Toliver; Khadimou Fall; Jacques Webster; Lawrence Taylor; Ebony Oshunrinde; Ugur Tig
- Producers: WondaGurl; Vou

Music video
- "Gang Gang" on YouTube

"Gang Gang" (stylized in all caps) is a song by American record label Cactus Jack Records, known as hip-hop group JackBoys, and American rapper Sheck Wes, with additional vocals from fellow American rappers Don Toliver, Luxury Tax 50, and Travis Scott (the label's leader, credited as Cactus Jack). (Note: JackBoys and Sheck Wes are the only credited artists across streaming platforms; all of the rappers are credited as featured artists on YouTube.) Written alongside producers WondaGurl and Vou, It was released from JackBoys' and Scott's compilation album JackBoys (2019).

== Composition and reception ==
The song's instrumental was originally used in American rapper Mar90s' December 2019 track, "Blue Hunnits" (featuring Slim Jxmmi), which was released two days prior. The song contains an interpolation of "Win" by Jay Rock. Kevin Cortez of HipHopDX, in a review of JackBoys, wrote that Sheck Wes "glides through 'Gang Gang' with a bag full of adlibs and charisma." Cortez described the song's hook (melodically rapped by Don Toliver with Sheck Wes and Travis Scott as backup vocals) as reminiscent of ASAP Rocky's "Babushka Boi", and the background humming as similar to that of Kid Cudi's.

== Music video ==
The official music video was released along with a short film by JackBoys on December 27, 2019. Co-directed by Scott (under his alias Cactus Jack) and White Trash Tyler, the music video follows the events of the short film. It depicts Travis Scott as a bandit alongside his crew, consisting of Sheck Wes, Don Toliver and Chase B, who ride around in an abandoned parking lot. Scott is seen riding in a Tesla Cyberquad and Tesla Cybertruck, and playing with The Boring Company's Not-A-Flamethrower.

== Charts ==
Chart (2020)	Peak position
Australia (ARIA)	63
Canada Hot 100 (Billboard)	40
New Zealand Hot Singles (RMNZ)	2
UK Singles (Official Charts)	52
US Billboard Hot 100	48
US Hot R&B/Hip-Hop Songs (Billboard)	22

== Certifications ==
Region	Certification	Certified units/sales
Canada (Music Canada)	Gold	40,000^{‡}
New Zealand (RMNZ)	Gold	15,000^{‡}
United States (RIAA)	Platinum	1,000,000^{‡}
^{‡} Sales+streaming figures based on certification alone.
