= Pixel Grip =

American electronic music band

- Origin: Chicago, Illinois, U.S.
- Genres: Electropop; dark wave; minimal synth; cold wave; EBM
- Years active: 2018–present
- Label: Feeltrip Records
- Members: Rita Lukea; Tyler Ommen; Jonathon Freund
- Website: pixelgripmusic.com

Pixel Grip is an American electronic music group, formed in Chicago, Illinois. The band consists of vocalist Rita Lukea and producers Tyler Ommen and Jonathon Freund. The band is largely inspired by the queer music scene emerging from clubs and discos in the last several decades.

== Discography ==
Studio albums

- Heavy Handed (2019)
- Arena (2021)
- Percepticide: The Death of Reality (2025)

Remixes

- "As Alive as You Need Me to Be (Pixel Grip Remix)" - from Tron Ares: Divergence by Nine Inch Nails (2026)

Collaborations

- "ANTIDOTE (AMORTAL RMX)" - from R-Type II by HEALTH (2026)

== Touring ==
=== 2026 European tour with Korn ===
In November 2026, Pixel Grip joined American nu-metal band Korn on their Euro Tour 2026, performing as an opening act alongside British metalcore band Architects. Replacing Youth Code for the second half of the tour, Pixel Grip performed across several European countries, including Germany, the Netherlands, Belgium, and Italy. The German dates included a performance at the ZAG-Arena in Hanover on November 13, 2026. The tour was scheduled to conclude in Milan on November 21.

Stage Foto Pixel Drive Hannover 2026
