= No Bystanders =

Song by Travis Scott featuring Sheck Wes and Juice Wrld

from the album Astroworld
- Released: August 3, 2018
- Genre: Crunk; trap
- Length: 3:38
- Label: Grand Hustle; Epic; Cactus Jack
- Songwriters: Jacques Webster; Jarad Higgins; Khadimou Fall; Ebony Oshunrinde; Mike Dean; Bryan Simmons; Cydel Young; Björk Guðmundsdóttir; Sigurjón Sigurdsson; Paul Beauregard; Ricky Dunigan; Jordan Houston; Lola Mitchell; Darnell Carlton; Robert Phillips; Filip Gežin
- Producers: WondaGurl; Dean; TM88; David Stromberg (co.); Gežin (co.)

"No Bystanders" (stylized in all caps) is a song by American rapper Travis Scott from his third studio album Astroworld (2018). It features additional vocals from American rappers Juice Wrld and Sheck Wes. The song samples "Jóga" by Björk and interpolates the song "Tear da Club Up" by Three 6 Mafia.

== Background ==
In an interview with Rolling Stone, Scott's A&R Sickamore spoke about the song's reference to "Tear da Club Up":

That's all Travis. He wanted the ultimate raging song. All he thought about that song was mosh pits. All the music we think about how it’s going to perform live. You always gotta think about that. Is it still gonna be a movie live? We did that song last night at Hard Summer — oh my God. It was one of the top songs of the night. There were huge mosh pits going crazy.

Travis Scott has also used the phrase "No Bystanders" at his concerts to encourage people to "mosh out", dance and "rage".

== Composition ==
Lyrically, the song is about how Travis Scott does not want people who do not party (referring to them as "bystanders") at his concerts, as well as his lifestyle. Juice Wrld sings the intro of the song ("The party never ends / In a motel, laying with my sins, yeah / I'm tryna get revenge / You'll be all out of love in the end"). In the chorus, Sheck Wes interpolates the chorus of "Tear da Club Up", chanting "Fuck the club up", and adds his "Bitch!" ad-lib as well.

== Critical reception ==
The song was praised by critics for its energetic and "explosive" style, and has been considered suitable for moshing and wild partying at concerts. Conversely, Ben Dandridge-Lemco, in his review of Astroworld for The Fader, wrote that Scott's collaboration with Sheck Wes and Juice Wrld "would seem like an obvious opportunity for him to run the table and show out", but "Instead, in the middle of an awkward skittering flow, he delivers the album's worst line: 'I told her it's B.Y.O.B., that mean buy your own booze.'"

== Live performances ==
Travis Scott performed the song at the 61st Annual Grammy Awards.

== Controversy ==
In April 2019, DJ Paul of Three 6 Mafia filed a $20 million lawsuit against Travis Scott for copyright infringement in the song, also pointing out that in his Grammys performance, Scott changed the lyrics to "tear the club up" instead of "fuck the club up." The lawsuit was settled in September 2019.

== Charts ==
Chart (2018)	Peak position
Canada Hot 100 (Billboard)	34
France (SNEP)	105
Sweden Heatseeker (Sverigetopplistan)	2
US Billboard Hot 100	31
US Hot R&B/Hip-Hop Songs (Billboard)	22

== Certifications ==
Region	Certification	Certified units/sales
Australia (ARIA)	Gold	35,000^{‡}
Brazil (Pro-Música Brasil)	Platinum	40,000^{‡}
Canada (Music Canada)	2× Platinum	160,000^{‡}
New Zealand (RMNZ)	Platinum	30,000^{‡}
Poland (ZPAV)	Gold	25,000^{‡}
United Kingdom (BPI)	Silver	200,000^{‡}
United States (RIAA)	2× Platinum	2,000,000^{‡}
^{‡} Sales+streaming figures based on certification alone.
