= Oz (music producer) =

Swiss record producer

OZ
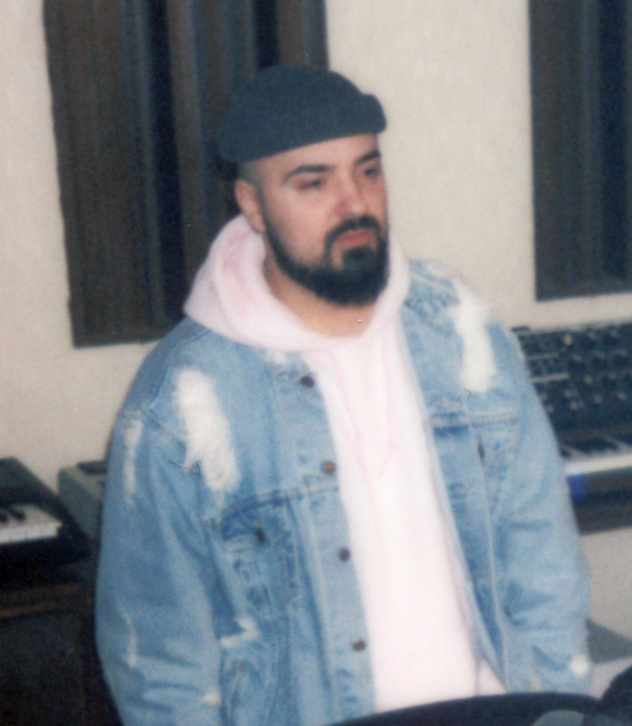
- Oz in 2019

Background information
- Also known as: Oz on the Beat; Ozmusiqe
- Born: Ozan Yildirim; 11 January 1992 (age 34); Wattwil, Switzerland
- Genres: Hip hop; trap; R&B
- Occupations: Record producer; songwriter
- Instruments: FL Studio; keyboard
- Years active: 2008–present

Ozan Yildirim (Turkish: Ozan Yıldırım; born 11 January 1992), professionally known as OZ, is a Swiss record producer and songwriter of Turkish descent. He has produced for many hip hop artists, including Drake, Future and Travis Scott, including on the number-one hits "Sicko Mode" (2018), "Highest in the Room" (2019) and "Life Is Good" (2020). He has received nominations for the Grammy Award for Best Rap Song for "Sicko Mode" and "Gold Roses".

== Early life ==
Yildirim grew up in Wattwil, Switzerland, as a son to Turkish parents. He developed an early passion for music, trying himself as a remixer and DJ under the stage name DJ Ladykiller. At 13 years old, he won an international DJ competition, beating out 63 competitors of all ages and winning a prize money of 300 Euros.

His family moved to the small and rural village of Gibswil in the Canton of Zürich, when Yildirim was 15 years old. According to him, there, he was the only foreigner in school and experienced a great deal of xenophobia, leading him to isolate himself and focus on his music.

After school, he completed an apprenticeship in retail and began working as a salesman for washing machines in the Swiss electronics store chain Fust.

== Career ==
He started producing beats in 2005, and later uploaded them on the internet. His career as a hip hop producer began in 2012, after being contacted by Austrian rapper Nazar and subsequently signing a deal with his label Wolfpack Entertainment. A collaboration began and OZ produced large parts of Nazar's albums Narkose (2012) and Fakker Lifestyle (2013).

Starting in 2014, OZ began receiving placements on tracks by US rappers. He would contact rappers via social media and e-mail and send them selections of his beats. According to OZ, he contacted American record producer The Beat Bully on Twitter and paid him 250 Swiss francs for rapper Meek Mill's e-mail address. In a similar manner, he managed to find out rapper Travis Scott's email address online. Both times, a placement was the result: in the case of Meek Mill, OZ ended up producing the songs "Been That" (featuring Rick Ross) and "Cold Hearted" (featuring Puff Daddy) on the rapper's 2015 album Dreams Worth More Than Money and in the case of Travis Scott, he produced the song "Backyard" on his 2014 mixtape Days Before Rodeo.

At the same time, OZ became more known within German hip hop, producing top-tier artists such as Bushido or Ufo361 and befriending rapper Shindy. He has produced multiple songs on all of Shindy's albums since then and in 2020 recorded the track "Morning Sun" with Shindy, where OZ can also be heard singing.

In 2018, OZ produced his first number-one single by supplying the second part of the beat to the song "Sicko Mode" by Travis Scott.

In 2020, he produced both "Popstar" and "Greece" by DJ Khaled featuring Drake. Although uncredited, he also supplied the original lyrics and vocal melody to the latter song.

He also solely produced Drake's number-one hit "Toosie Slide".

His recording studio is located in Wald, Zürich.

== Production discography ==
=== Charted songs ===
Title	Year	Peak chart positions							Album
Title	Year	US	US R&B/HH	AUS	CAN	IRE	NZ	UK	Album
"How Many Times" (DJ Khaled featuring Chris Brown, Lil Wayne, and Big Sean)	2015	68	23	—	—	—	—	—	I Changed a Lot
"Random" (G-Eazy)	2015	94	31	—	—	—	—	—	When It's Dark Out
"U With Me?" (Drake)	2016	44	20	—	47	—	—	72	Views
"Offended" (Meek Mill featuring 21 Savage and Young Thug)	2016	70	29	—	100	—	—	—	DC4
"Saved" (Khalid)	2017	—	—	92	—	—	—	—	American Teen
"Dubai Shit" (Huncho Jack featuring Offset)	2017	83	35	—	63	—	—	—	Huncho Jack, Jack Huncho
"Contra" (Logic)	2018	60	28	—	71	—	—	84	Bobby Tarantino II
"Champion" (Nav featuring Travis Scott)	2018	86	43	—	47	—	—	—	Reckless
"Sicko Mode" (Travis Scott featuring Drake)	2018	1	1	6	3	11	7	9	Astroworld
"Love Scars 3" (Trippie Redd)	2018	73	37	—	—	—	—	—	A Love Letter to You 3
"1400 / 999 Freestyle" (Trippie Redd featuring Juice Wrld)	2018	55	24	—	76	—	—	—	A Love Letter to You 3
"Freaky" (Tory Lanez)	2019	—	—	—	41	—	—	94	Love Me Now? Reloaded
"24/7" (Meek Mill featuring Ella Mai)	2019	54	25	—	—	—	—	66	Championships
"Omertà" (Drake)	2019	35	14	69	8	44	—	33	The Best in the World Pack
"Gold Roses" (Rick Ross featuring Drake)	2019	39	16	91	33	76	—	42	Port of Miami 2
"Peta" (Roddy Ricch featuring Meek Mill)	2019	72	31	—	72	—	—	—	Please Excuse Me for Being Antisocial
"Highest in the Room" (Travis Scott)	2019	1	1	3	1	3	2	2	JackBoys
"Life Is Good" (Future featuring Drake)	2020	2	2	11	3	5	13	3	High Off Life
"Toosie Slide" (Drake)	2020	1	1	3	2	1	1	1	Dark Lane Demo Tapes
"Time Flies" (Drake)	2020	30	17	—	22	—	—	—	Dark Lane Demo Tapes
"Losses" (Drake)	2020	51	26	—	49	—	—	—	Dark Lane Demo Tapes
"Greece" (DJ Khaled feat. Drake)	2020	8	6	35	3	21	—	8	Khaled Khaled
"Popstar" (DJ Khaled feat. Drake)	2020	3	3	10	1	14	17	11	Khaled Khaled
"Girls Want Girls" (Drake featuring Lil Baby)	2021	2	2	2	8	3	11	2	Certified Lover Boy
"Love All" (Drake featuring Jay-Z)	2021	10	9	12	20	—	—	— (Note: "Love All" did not enter the UK Singles Chart, as chart rules only allow three songs per artist to chart within the top one hundred at a time, but peaked at number 7 on the UK Streaming Chart.)	Certified Lover Boy

== Production credits ==
=== 2013 ===
- Nazar - OZ Interlude

=== 2014 ===
- Fabolous – "Ball Drop" (feat. French Montana) from The Young OG Project (produced with The MeKanics)
- Travis Scott – "Backyard" from Days Before Rodeo (produced with Syk Sense)
- The Game – "Really" (feat. Yo Gotti, 2 Chainz, Soulja Boy & T.I.) from Blood Moon: Year of the Wolf (produced with The MeKanics)
- Summer Cem – "Nike Airs" from HAK

=== 2015 ===
- DJ Khaled – "How Many Times" from I Changed a Lot
- Meek Mill – "Been That" (feat. Rick Ross), and "Cold Hearted" (feat. Puff Daddy) from Dreams Worth More Than Money
- G-Eazy – "Random" from When It's Dark Out
- Chinx – "Hey Fool" (feat. Nipsey Hussle & Zack) from Welcome to JFK
- Logic – "I Am the Greatest" from The Incredible True Story
- Jeremih – "Giv No Fuks" (feat. Migos) from Late Nights: The Album

=== 2016 ===
- K.Michelle – "Ain't You" from More Issues Than Vogue
- Drake – "U With Me?" from Views
- Ali Bumaye – "Best Friends" (feat. Bushido) and "Missgestalten" from Rumble in the Jungle
- Meek Mill – "Offended" (feat. Young Thug & 21 Savage) and "Outro" (feat. Lil Snupe & French Montana) from DC4
- Dreezy – "See What You On" from No Hard Feelings
- Travis Scott – "the ends" and "outside" from Birds in the Trap Sing McKnight
- Shindy – Dreams [full album]
- Gucci Mane – "Drove U Crazy" (feat. Bryson Tiller) from The Return of East Atlanta Santa
- 6lack – "Rules" from Free 6lack

=== 2017 ===
- Khalid – "Saved," "Let's Go," and "Keep Me," from American Teen
- Travis Scott & Quavo / Huncho Jack – "Dubai Shit" (feat. Offset) from Huncho Jack, Jack Huncho
- Bushido – "Moonwalk"
- DRAM – "I Had a Dream," "Crumbs" (feat. Playboi Carti), and "Eyeyieyie," from Big Baby DRAM
- G-Eazy – "Shake It Up" (feat. 24hrs, MadeinTYO and E-40)

=== 2018 ===
- Nav – "Champions" (feat. Travis Scott) from Reckless (produced with Foreign Teck)
- Logic – "Contra" (produced with Nico Chiara and BLWYRMND) and "Wizard of OZ" (produced with 6ix), from Bobby Tarantino 2
- Trippie Redd - "UKA UKA," "BANG!," "Shake It Up," "Gore," and "Missing My Idols," from Life's a Trip
- 6lack – "Cutting Ties"
- Smokepurpp & Murda Beatz – "Big Dope" from Bless Yo Trap (produced with Murda Beatz)
- RIN (Rapper) – "Avirex," "Burberry/SuperParisLight," "Oldboy," "XTC," and "Outro" from Planet Megatron
- Lil Baby – "Bank" (feat. Moneybagg Yo) from Harder Than Ever (produced with Turbo)
- Travis Scott – "Sicko Mode" from Astroworld (produced with Cubeatz, add. prod. by MD)
- Tory Lanez – "FeRRis WhEEL" (feat. Trippie Redd) from Love Me Now? (produced with Dez Wright)
- Trippie Redd – "Can't Love," "Love Scars 3," "A.L.L.T.Y. 3" (feat. Baby Goth), "Emani Interlude" (feat. Emani22), "Wicked", "Loyalty Before Royalty," and "1400 / 999 Freestyle" (feat. Juice WRLD) from A Love Letter to You 3
- Meek Mill – "24/7" (feat. Ella Mai) from Championships (produced with EY, Austin Powerz, and Pro Logic)

=== 2019 ===
- Shindy – "DODI"
- Zacari – "Midas Touch" (produced with Teddy Walton and Syk Sense)
- Tory Lanez – "Freaky" (produced with Nil$)
- Shindy – Drama (complete album)
- Nav – "To My Grave" from Bad Habits (produced with Pro Logic)
- Drake – "Omertà" from The Best in the World Pack (produced with Deats & EY)
- Dreamville – "Got Me" (featuring Ari Lennox, Omen, Ty Dolla Sign and Dreezy) from Revenge of the Dreamers III (produced with Deputy & MD)
- Rick Ross – "Gold Roses" (featuring Drake) from Port of Miami 2 (produced with Vinylz, Syk Sense, and The Rascals)
- Trippie Redd — "Throw It Away", "Be Yourself", and "Lil Wayne", from !
- Travis Scott – "Highest in the Room" (produced with Nik D and Mike Dean)
- Young M.A. – "Bipolar" (produced with Syk Sense)
- Killumantii - "Kill Em" (produced with Don Cannon)
- Tinashe - "Story of Us" from Songs for You

=== 2020 ===
- Future - "Life Is Good" (produced with D. Hill and Ambezza)
- Drake - "Toosie Slide"
- Shindy - "What's Luv" and "Sony Pictures"
- UFO361 - "Bad Girls, Good Vibes"
- Drake - "Time Flies" from Dark Lane Demo Tapes
- Drake - "Losses" from Dark Lane Demo Tapes (produced with Sevn Thomas and co-produced by Foreign Teck and Elyas)
- DJ Khaled - "Greece" (featuring Drake) (produced with Tiggi and DJ Khaled)
- DJ Khaled - "Popstar" (featuring Drake) (produced with DAVID x ELI)
- Gunna - "Relentless" (featuring Lil Uzi Vert) from Wunna (Deluxe) (produced with Wheezy and Nik D)

=== 2021 ===
- Drake – "Girls Want Girls" (feat. Lil Baby) (produced with Ambezza), "Love All" (feat. Jay-Z), "Fair Trade" (feat. Travis Scott) (produced with Jahaan Sweet, Patron, Travis Scott, and wondaGURL), and "No Friends in the Industry" (produced with Nik D and Vinylz) from Certified Lover Boy
- Travis Scott – "Escape Plan" (single)

=== 2022 ===
- Drake & 21 Savage – "Middle of the Ocean" (produced with LOOF, Nik D, Noel Cadastre, and Sucuki) and "3AM on Glenwood" (produced with 40 and Peter Iskander) from Her Loss
- Jack Harlow – from Come Home the Kids Miss You

=== 2023 ===
- Drake – "Fear of Heights" (produced with BNYX, Nik D, Pooh Beatz, and xynothing) and "First Person Shooter" (feat. J. Cole) (produced with Boi-1da, Coleman, FNZ, Tay Keith, and Vinylz) from For All the Dogs
- Jack Harlow - "Lovin on Me" (Single)

=== 2025 ===
- Drake – "National Treasures" (produced with Boi-1da, London Cyr, Nico Baran, Patron, Ben10k, and Ryan Bakalarczyk) and "What Did I Miss?" (produced with Tay Keith, FNZ, London Cyr, O Lil Angel, DJ LEWIS, Patron, Elyas, and Gyz) from Iceman
- Drake – "Which One" (feat. Central Cee) (produced with O Lil Angel, Bonboi, DJ Cruz, and b4u) from Maid of Honour
