= WondaGurl =

Canadian record producer, songwriter and record executive

- Born: Ebony Naomi Oshunrinde; December 28, 1996 (age 29); Scarborough, Toronto, Ontario, Canada
- Origin: Brampton, Ontario, Canada
- Genres: Hip hop; trap; R&B; electronic
- Occupations: Record producer; songwriter; record executive
- Instruments: FL Studio; keyboard
- Years active: 2009–present
- Labels: Cactus Jack; Sony; Wonderchild

Ebony Naomi Oshunrinde (born December 28, 1996), professionally known as WondaGurl, is a Canadian record producer, songwriter and record executive.

== Early life ==
Ebony Naomi Oshunrinde, who is of Nigerian heritage, was born on December 28, 1996 at the Scarborough Grace Hospital in Scarborough, Toronto, Ontario, Canada, to Josefina Oshunrinde. She lived with her mother in North York and Mississauga before eventually settling in Brampton. WondaGurl started producing on her keyboard with drum pads at age 9. She also credits a Casio keyboard gifted to her by her grandmother as influencing her musical trajectory. According to WondaGurl, she started making beats seriously when she discovered the digital audio workstation Fruity Loops around age 11 or 12.

Her musical tastes also developed in relation to her family, with her mother turning her on to Biggie Smalls and P. Diddy and her brother introducing her to Dipset and hip hop more generally. She credits her mentor Boi-1da for the name "WondaGurl," saying "I got my name from his name, I just switched it around."

== Career ==
At age 15, WondaGurl entered the 2011 and 2012 Battle of The Beat Makers competition in Toronto, Ontario, where Canadian record producer Boi-1da was present as one of the guest judges at both years. She won first place in the latter year, earning herself a trophy and a Roland SH-01 Gaia synthesizer.

WondaGurl became a protégé of Boi-1da shortly after the competition, and around 2013, started to closely work with American rapper Travis Scott at 16 years old, whom she also signed to years later. She also garnered one of her first high-profile music placements that same year, with rapper Jay-Z on his twelfth studio album Magna Carta Holy Grail, working on the track "Crown" with Travis and record producer Mike Dean. This led to her working with other major artists and producers since then, producing her first Top 40 hit single "Antidote" by Travis Scott in 2015, which was co-produced by Canadian record producer Eestbound. She would soon after go on to sign Eestbound to a production deal at the time, becoming her first co-producer. His deal with her later ended around 2017, leaving them to go their separate ways.

In 2018, she was featured in the Music category of Forbes 30 Under 30. She is one of the youngest women to add production to a platinum-selling hip hop album.

In July 2020, WondaGurl signed a worldwide publishing deal with Travis Scott's Cactus Jack Publishing and Sony Music Publishing, while separately establishing a joint-venture publishing entity with Sony for her own label, Wonderchild Records.

At the Juno Awards of 2021, WondaGurl won the Jack Richardson Producer of the Year Award for her work on the songs "Aim for the Moon" (Pop Smoke feat. Quavo) and "Gang Gang" (JackBoys and Sheck Wes). She was both the first Black Canadian woman to win the award, and the first woman ever to win as a producer for other artists rather than as an artist self-producing her own work.

On July 24, 2025, WondaGurl released her debut studio album Metal Tail through Boom.Records. In October 2025, she was honored at the Billboard Canada Women in Music with the Producer of the Year award.

== Discography ==
Studio albums

- Metal Tail (2025)

Collaborative albums

- Baby Yaga 2 (with Jugger; 2025)

EPs

- Toronto / Paris (2019)

== Production discography ==
=== Singles produced ===
List of singles produced, with selected chart positions and certifications, showing year released and album name
| Title | Year | Peak chart positions | | | | | | | | | | Certifications | Album |
| Title | Year | US | AUS | BEL (FL) | CAN | FRA | GER | IRL | NZ | SWI | UK | Certifications | Album |
|---|---|---|---|---|---|---|---|---|---|---|---|---|---|
| "Bitch Better Have My Money" (Rihanna) | 2015 | 15 | 14 | 27 | 11 | 3 | 17 | 39 | 10 | 7 | 27 | ARIA: Platinum; RIAA: 4× Platinum; RMNZ: Gold | non-album single |
| "Antidote" (Travis Scott) | 2015 | 16 | 75 | 38 | 120 | — | — | — | — | — | — | ARIA: Gold; RIAA: 7× Platinum; RMNZ: Gold | Rodeo |
| "No Limit" (Remix) (Usher featuring ASAP Ferg, Master P, Travis Scott) | 2016 | 32 | 45 | — | — | — | — | — | — | — | — | | Hard II Love |
| "Braille" (Ab-Soul featuring Bas) | 2016 | — | — | — | — | — | — | — | — | — | — | | Do What Thou Wilt. |
"—" denotes a recording that did not chart or was not released in that territory.

== Wonderchild Records ==
Wonderchild LLC
- Parent company: Red Bull Records; Red Bull GmbH
- Founded: April 14, 2020; 6 years ago
- Founder: WondaGurl
- Distributors: The Orchard (Red Bull releases; 2020–present); Vydia (Jugger releases; 2025–present); RCA Records (Rhyan Douglas releases; 2023–present)
- Genre: Hip-hop; trap; pop; R&B
- Country of origin: Canada
- Location: Toronto, Ontario

Wonderchild LLC, doing business as Wonderchild Records (formerly d/b/a as Wonderchild Music), is a Canadian record label and music publishing company founded by WondaGurl on April 14, 2020.

The label is a joint-venture with Red Bull Records for its recording entity and a joint-venture with Sony Music Publishing for its publishing entity.

=== Roster ===
==== Recording ====
| Artists | Year signed | Releases (under the label) | Notes |
|---|---|---|---|
| Jugger | 2020 | 2 (1 Red Bull & The Orchard release; 1 Vydia release) | Jointly with Vydia, formerly jointly with Red Bull and The Orchard |
| Chris LaRocca | 2023 | 1 (1 other previous independent release) | Jointly with Red Bull and The Orchard |
| Rhyan Douglas | 2024 | 1 (Extended play) | Jointly with RCA |

==== Publishing ====
===== Current =====
====== In-house producers ======
| Producer | Years under the label | Notes |
|---|---|---|
| WondaGurl | Founder | Jointly with Sony and Cactus Jack |
| Jenius Level | 2020–present | Jointly with Sony |
| Forthenight | 2020–present | Jointly with Sony |
| London Cyr | 2020–present | Jointly with Sony |
| Freakey | 2022–present | Jointly with Sony |
| Lucyclubhouse | 2022–present | Jointly with Sony |

===== Former =====
====== In-house producers ======
| Producer | Years under the label | Notes |
|---|---|---|
| Eestbound | 2015–2017 | Jointly with Sony; predates Wonderchild founding |
