= Sheck Wes =

American rapper (born 1998)

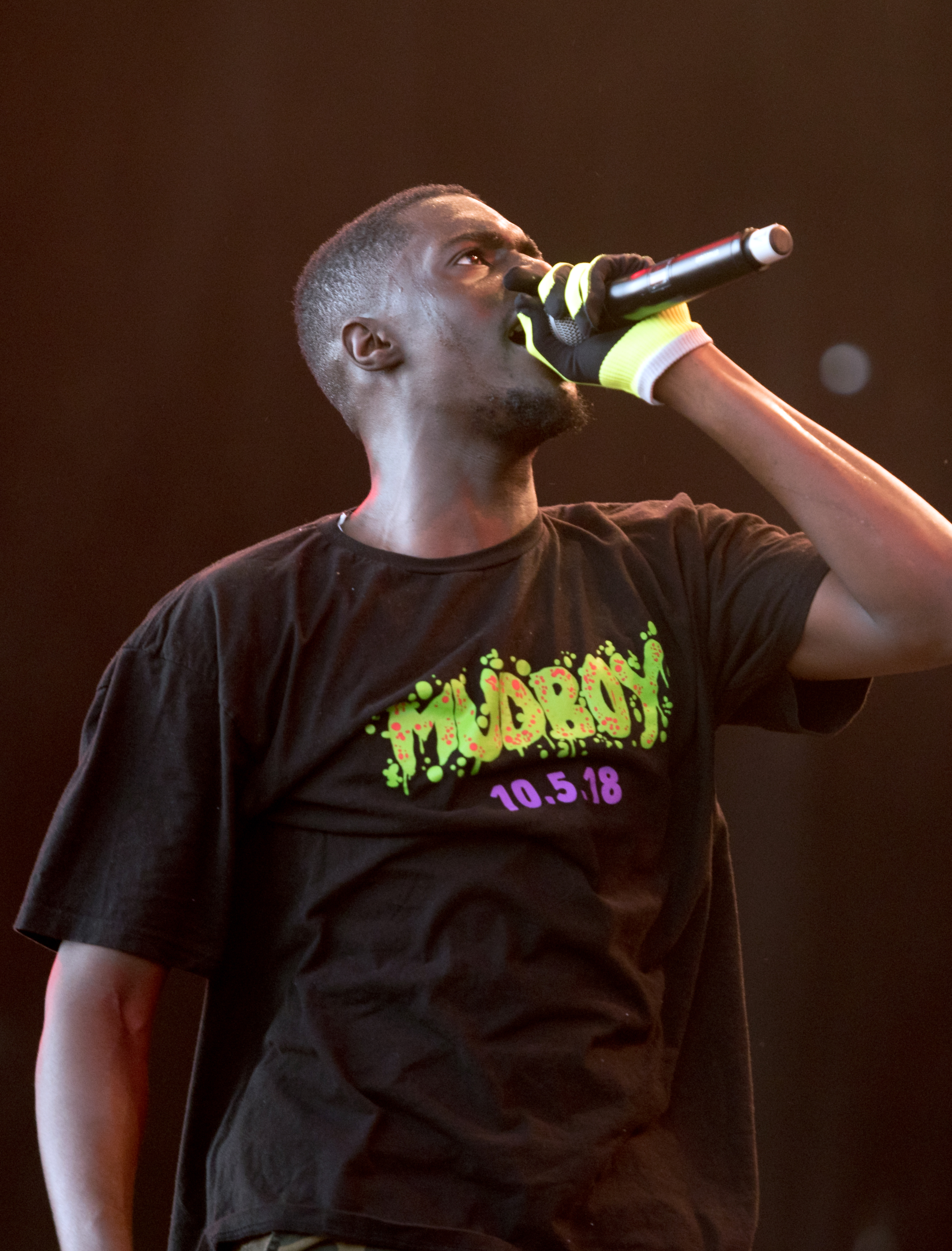
- Wes in 2019

Background information
- Also known as: Kid Khadi; Wes; Young Sheck Wes; Mudboy
- Born: Khadimou Rassoul Cheikh Fall; September 10, 1998 (age 28); New York City, U.S.
- Genres: East Coast hip-hop; trap; rap metal
- Occupations: Rapper; singer; songwriter
- Years active: 2016–present
- Labels: Cactus Jack; GOOD; Interscope
- Member of: JackBoys
- Website: sheckwes.com

Khadimou Rassoul Cheikh Fall (born September 10, 1998), known professionally as Sheck Wes, is an American rapper, singer, and songwriter. He is best known for his 2018 single "Mo Bamba", which went viral and peaked at number six on the Billboard Hot 100.

In February 2018, Wes signed a recording contract with Travis Scott's Cactus Jack and Kanye West's GOOD Music, in a joint venture with Interscope Records.

== Early life ==
Khadimou Rassoul Cheikh Fall was born on September 10, 1998, in the Harlem neighborhood of New York City to parents of Senegalese descent. Fall was raised in a Muslim household. At age five, he and his mother, Ella Kingsland, moved to Milwaukee, Wisconsin, where he lived for nine years. At 14, he moved back to New York. Fall began making music at age 11, to relieve stress due to his troubled childhood as he was raised in a hostile environment. While in high school, basketball became a major extracurricular pursuit, but he attracted interest from a fashion talent scout, leading him to skip a playoff game to participate in the Madison Square Garden unveiling of the Yeezy Season 3 collection.

== Music career ==
=== 2018–2019: Mudboy ===
On February 2, 2018, Wes signed to Kanye West's GOOD Music and Travis Scott's Cactus Jack Records label alongside Interscope. Wes made a guest appearance on Scott's third studio album Astroworld on the song "No Bystanders" alongside American rapper Juice Wrld. On October 2, Wes announced his debut studio album titled Mudboy which was released just three days after. On March 19, Wes released a new single under the Cactus Jack label called YKTS.

=== 2019–present: Hell 2 Paradise ===
Following the release of Mudboy, Wes announced that his second studio album was in the works.

In January 2019, Wes was part of the opening act for Eminem's concert in Hawaii alongside fellow American rapper Logic. On July 18, Wes released the singles "Sadio Mane", and "Losing My Mind". The following day on July 19, he appeared on Chase B and Young Thug's song "Mayday". On October 31, he released the song "YKTS" which was accompanied by a music video. On December 27, Wes made a guest appearance on the Cactus Jack compilation album JackBoys on the song "Gang Gang" also featuring Don Toliver, Travis Scott, and Luxury Tax 50.

On November 2020, Wes released the singles "Rich One Day" and "#BeenBallin".

In January 2021, Wes released the song "GFU" with record label YSL Records and American rapper Yak Gotti, featuring American rapper Yung Kayo, which serves as the second single from the label's compilation album, Slime Language 2 (2021).

In 2023, Wes had guest vocals on the original version of the song "Fein" by Travis Scott, as well as the version of the song shown in the film Circus Maximus.

== Basketball career ==
Sheck Wes
Personal information
- Listed height: 6 ft 3 in (1.91 m)
- Listed weight: 200 lb (91 kg)

Career information
- High school: Norman Thomas (New York City, New York)
- NBA draft: 2020: undrafted
- Playing career: 2020–2021
- Position: Point guard

Career history
- 2021: Paris Basketball

On November 18, 2020, Fall wrote on Instagram that he had entered the 2020 NBA draft, although he went undrafted. On November 19, 2020, he joined LNB Pro A team Paris Basketball. On May 10, 2021, Fall signed with Paris Basketball under his stage name, and made his debut on May 28, playing four minutes. Fall averaged 1.3 points in three total appearances.

=== Career statistics ===
Year	Team	GP	GS	MPG	FG%	3P%	FT%	RPG	APG	SPG	BPG	PPG
2020–21	Paris Basketball	3	0	7.0	.333	.333	.500	.7	.3	.0	.0	1.3

== Legal issues ==
On January 31, 2019, Ridge Productions claimed Fall had refused to pay for the video for his forthcoming single "Mudboy". Ridge Productions posted the original edit of the video, with substituted audio mocking Fall and his crew for reneging on their agreement.

In February 2019, Fall was caught on video stalking his former partner, singer Justine Skye. Fall was removed from an advertising campaign for Major League Soccer in response to the allegations. Skye was subsequently reported to have requested a restraining order against Fall. Fall denied the allegations, and no charges were ever brought forward. Skye's one-time boyfriend, rapper GoldLink, insulted and criticized Fall publicly over the abuse allegations.

On May 21, 2020, Fall was arrested on drug and gun charges in New York. He was later released.

== Discography ==
=== Studio albums ===
List of studio albums, with selected details
Title	Album details	Peak chart positions						Certifications
Title	Album details	US	US R&B/HH	US Rap	BEL (FL)	CAN	NLD	Certifications
Mudboy	Released: October 5, 2018; Label: Cactus Jack, GOOD, Interscope; Format: Digital download, streaming	17	11	11	115	19	121	RIAA: Gold; MC: Gold

=== Collaborative albums ===
List of collaborative albums, with selected details
Title	Album details	Peak chart positions				
Title	Album details	US	AUS	BEL (FL)	CAN	NZ
JackBoys (with Travis Scott, Don Toliver, Chase B, and Luxury Tax as JackBoys)	Released: December 27, 2019; Label: Cactus Jack, Epic; Formats: CD, LP, cassette, digital download, streaming	1	5	19	1	5
JackBoys 2 (with JackBoys)	Released: July 13, 2025; Label: Cactus Jack, Epic; Formats: CD, LP, digital download, streaming	1	3	9	4	5

=== Singles ===
==== As lead artist ====
List of singles as lead artist, with selected chart positions, showing year released and album name
Title	Year	Peak chart positions						Certifications	Album
Title	Year	US	US R&B/HH	AUS	CAN	NZ	UK	Certifications	Album
"Live Sheck Wes"	2017	—	—	—	—	—	—		Mudboy
"Mo Bamba"	2017	6	2	29	5	16	26	RIAA: 5× Platinum; MC: 3× Platinum; RMNZ: Gold; SNEP: Gold	Mudboy
"Chippi Chippi"	2018	—	—	—	—	—	—		Mudboy
"Enzo" (with DJ Snake featuring Offset, 21 Savage and Gucci Mane)	2019	—	—	—	—	— (Note: "Enzo" did not enter the NZ Top 40 Singles Chart, but peaked at number 21 on the NZ Hot Singles Chart.)	—		Carte Blanche
"Sadio Mane"	2019	—	—	—	—	—	—		Non-album singles
"Losing My Mind"	2019	—	—	—	—	—	—		Non-album singles
"YKTS"	2019	—	—	—	—	—	—		Non-album singles
"Gang Gang" (with JackBoys)	2019	48	22	63	40	— (Note: "Gang Gang" did not enter the NZ Top 40 Singles Chart, but peaked at number 2 on the NZ Hot Singles Chart.)	52	RIAA: Platinum; RMNZ: Gold	JackBoys
"Rich One Day"	2020	—	—	—	—	—	—		Non-album single
"GFU" (with Young Stoner Life and Yak Gotti featuring Yung Kayo)	2021	—	—	—	—	—	—		Slime Language 2
"MVP"	2022	—	—	—	—	—	—		Non-album singles
"LFG!"	2022	—	—	—	—	—	—		Non-album singles
"Pain!"	2022	—	—	—	—	—	—		Non-album singles
"Beast"	2024	—	—	—	—	—	—		Non-album singles
"ILMB" (with Travis Scott)	2025	—	—	—	—	— (Note: "ILMB" did not enter the NZ Top 40 Singles Chart, but peaked at number 29 on the NZ Hot Singles Chart.)	—		JackBoys 2
"2000 Excursion" (with Travis Scott and Don Toliver)	2025	72	24	—	78	— (Note: "2000 Excursion" did not enter the NZ Top 40 Singles Chart, but peaked at number nine on the NZ Hot Singles Chart.)	—		JackBoys 2
"—" denotes a recording that did not chart or was not released in that territory.

==== As featured artist ====
Title	Year	Album
"Shopping Spree" (Murda Beatz featuring Lil Pump and Sheck Wes)	2019	Non-album singles
"Mayday" (Chase B featuring Sheck Wes and Young Thug)	2019	Non-album singles

=== Other charted songs ===
Title	Year	Peak chart positions					Certifications	Album
Title	Year	US	US R&B/HH	CAN	FRA	SWE Heat.	Certifications	Album
"No Bystanders" (Travis Scott featuring Juice Wrld and Sheck Wes)	2018	31	22	34	105	2	RIAA: 2× Platinum; ARIA: Gold; MC: 2× Platinum	Astroworld
"Stick" (JID and J. Cole featuring Kenny Mason and Sheck Wes)	2022	71	20	81	—	—		D-Day: A Gangsta Grillz Mixtape
"Velour" (with Don Toliver)	2025	— (Note: "Velour" did not enter the US Billboard Hot 100, but peaked at number 12 on the Bubbling Under Hot 100 chart.)	45	—	—	—		JackBoys 2

== Filmography ==
In 2024, Sheck Wes appeared in the psychological thriller Lake George, in a supporting role. The film was released to American theatres on January 31, 2025.

=== Film ===
Year	Title	Role
2019	Travis Scott: Look Mom I Can Fly	Himself
2023	Circus Maximus	Himself
2024	Lake George	Inmate 1

== See also ==
- List of one-hit wonders in the United States
- List of people from Harlem
