= Cactus Jack Records =

American record label

- Founded: January 10, 2017; 9 years ago
- Founder: Travis Scott
- Distributor: Various
- Genre: Hip hop; trap; R&B
- Country of origin: United States
- Location: Houston, Texas

Cactus Jack Records is an American record label and music publishing company founded by American rapper Travis Scott on January 10, 2017. As of 2025, current acts include Scott himself, Sheck Wes, Don Toliver, Luxury Tax 50, SoFaygo and Wallie the Sensei, while former acts include Smokepurpp and Malu Trevejo. The label's artists are collectively known as the hip-hop group JackBoys.

The label also has its own publishing entity, Cactus Jack Publishing, to whom they signed DJ Chase B on the recording side, and Canadian record producer WondaGurl and rapper and songwriter Dougie F on the publishing side.

== History ==
In March 2017, Travis Scott announced he would be launching an imprint, under the name of Cactus Jack Records. During an interview, Scott said, "I'm not doing it to have financial control over my music. First, I want to help other artists, launch new names, and provide opportunities. I want to do what happened to me for them, but better." In December 2017, hip-hop duo Huncho Jack, consisting of Scott and Quavo of the hip-hop trio Migos, released their debut album Huncho Jack, Jack Huncho under the label. It peaked at number three on the Billboard 200.

In February 2018, the label signed Sheck Wes in a joint venture with Interscope Records and Kanye West's label, GOOD Music. On March 10, Wes announced his debut studio album titled Mudboy, which was released on October 5. On August 3, Scott released his third studio album Astroworld, containing a feature on "No Bystanders" from Wes. That same month, Don Toliver, who guest performed on "Can't Say", signed to the label. Astroworld debuted atop the Billboard 200, while Mudboy reached number 17.

On November 29, 2019, Scott announced the label's first compilation album, JackBoys, which was released on December 27 and debuted atop the Billboard 200.

On March 13, 2020, Toliver released his debut studio album, Heaven or Hell, under the label, which was supported by three singles: "No Idea", "Can't Feel My Legs" and "Had Enough". The album peaked at number seven on the Billboard 200. On April 24, Scott and Kid Cudi, as the duo the Scotts, released their namesake track. On July 21, Canadian record producer and close collaborator WondaGurl signed a worldwide publishing deal with Cactus Jack's publishing division, Cactus Jack Publishing and Sony/ATV Music Publishing, in conjunction with her own record label and publishing company, Wonderchild Music.

In February 2021, SoFaygo had signed to Cactus Jack, around the same time his hit song "Knock Knock" began to gain traction. In July, Scott opened up a new cannabis farm known as Cactus Farm. On June 24, 2021, Scott announced a collaboration between Cactus Jack and the fashion brand Dior which its menswear collection was revealed the following day on a live stream that also showcased snippets of Scott's upcoming fourth studio album, Utopia. In late September 2021, Toliver and Chase B announced they would be releasing their own solo projects titled Life of a Don and Escapism respectively in October. Toliver later released Life of a Don on the 8th of that month, with the album charting at number two on the Billboard 200.

On October 19, 2022, SoFaygo announced the release date of his debut studio album, Pink Heartz, for November 11 as well as releasing 4 singles from the album. In January 2023, it was announced that Cactus Jack would host the NBA All-Stars Weekend event at Salt Lake City, Utah with YSL Entertainment Group. In February 2023, Toliver released his third album, Love Sick, which peaked at number eight on the Billboard 200. In July of that year, Scott released his fourth album Utopia, which debuted at number one on the Billboard 100—where it remained for five weeks—and was nominated for Best Rap Album at the 66th Annual Grammy Awards.

On June 14, 2024, Toliver released his fourth studio album, Hardstone Psycho, which was supported by three singles: "Bandit", "Deep in the Water" and "Attitude". The album peaked at number three on the Billboard 200 and earned 76,500 album-equivalent units in its first week, becoming his fastest-selling album.

In March 2025, Scott announced the label's second compilation album JackBoys 2. Later in April, he released official merch and box sets, along with a musical short film directed by filmmaker Harmony Korine as the album's trailer. The same day, Wallie the Sensei, who had recently featured on "Dodger Blue" from Kendrick Lamar's GNX (2024), was announced as the label's newest signing as well as his participation on the album.

Scott performed a one-off concert in the city of Barcelona performing 2 unreleased JackBoys 2 songs on May 10, one day before the El Clásico match between Spanish La Liga clubs Barcelona and Real Madrid on May 11, 2025. In a collaboration with Spotify, Cactus Jack sponsored Barcelona on their kit as a special edition for the game, as well as Barcelona Femení on their last match of the season on May 18.

Scott announced JackBoys 2 would be released on July 13, 2025. The album's release was supported by two singles, "ILMB" and "2000 Excursion", and debuted at #1 on the Billboard 200.

On Halloween, October 31, 2025, SoFaygo announced that his second studio album, Mania, would be released on November 21. The album would release that day to all platforms.

On September 5, 2025, Toliver released the lead single to his upcoming fifth studio album, titled "Tiramisu". The name of the album would later be revealed as Octane through merchandise that was given to fans at his pop-up event at ComplexCon on October 25, with the album serving as a follow-up to Hardstone Psycho. On January 22, 2026, Toliver revealed the album's release date of January 30 and shared its cover art. The album was supported by three additional singles, "ATM", "Body", and "E85", and debuted at number one on the US Billboard 200 at release, becoming Toliver's first album to do so.

== Notable artists ==
=== Recording ===
==== Current ====
Artists	Year signed	Releases under the label	Notes
Travis Scott	Founder	5	Jointly with Epic, formerly Grand Hustle
Sheck Wes	2018	1	Jointly with GOOD and Interscope
Don Toliver	2018	5	Jointly with Atlantic
SoFaygo	2021	3	—N/a
Wallie the Sensei	2025	1	—N/a

==== Former ====
Artists	Years on the label	Releases under the label
Smokepurpp	2017–2019	—N/a
Malu Trevejo	2021	—N/a

=== Publishing ===
==== In-house producers ====
Producer	Year signed	Notes
As part of Cactus Jack Records (Recording)
Chase B	2019	Jointly with Columbia
As part of Cactus Jack Publishing (Publishing)
WondaGurl	2020	Jointly with Sony Music Publishing

== Discography ==
The label has officially released thirteen studio albums and two compilation albums.

=== Studio albums ===
Artist	Album	Details
Huncho Jack	Huncho Jack, Jack Huncho (released with Grand Hustle, Epic, Quality Control, Capitol and Motown)	Released: December 21, 2017; Chart position: #3 U.S.; RIAA certification: –
Travis Scott	Astroworld (released with Grand Hustle and Epic)	Released: August 3, 2018; Chart position: #1 U.S.; RIAA certification: 6× Platinum
Sheck Wes	Mudboy (released with GOOD and Interscope)	Released: October 5, 2018; Chart position: #17 U.S.; RIAA Certification: Gold
Don Toliver	Heaven or Hell (released with Atlantic)	Released: March 13, 2020; Chart position: #7 U.S.; RIAA Certification: Platinum
Don Toliver	Life of a Don (released with Atlantic)	Released: October 8, 2021; Chart position: #2 U.S.; RIAA certification: –
SoFaygo	Pink Heartz	Released: November 11, 2022; Chart position: –; RIAA certification: –
Don Toliver	Love Sick (released with Atlantic)	Released: February 24, 2023; Chart position: #8 U.S.; RIAA certification: Gold
SoFaygo	Go+	Released: June 14, 2023; Chart position: –; RIAA certification: –
Travis Scott	Utopia (released with Epic)	Released: July 28, 2023; Chart position: #1 U.S.; RIAA certification: 2× Platinum
Don Toliver	Hardstone Psycho (released with Atlantic)	Released: June 14, 2024; Chart position: #3 U.S.; RIAA certification: Gold
SoFaygo	MANIA	Released: November 21, 2025; Chart position: –; RIAA certification: –
Don Toliver	OCTANE (released with Atlantic)	Released: January 30, 2026; Chart position: #1 U.S.; RIAA certification: -
Chase B	Be Very Afraid	Released: February 27, 2026; Chart position: –; RIAA certification: –

=== Compilation albums ===
Artist	Album	Details
JackBoys and Travis Scott	JackBoys (released with Epic)	Released: December 27, 2019; Chart position: #1 U.S.; RIAA certification: –
JackBoys and Travis Scott	JackBoys 2 (released with Epic)	Released: July 13, 2025; Chart position: #1 U.S.; RIAA certification: –

=== Other charted songs ===
List of songs, with selected chart positions, showing year released and album name
Title	Year	Peak chart positions					Certifications	Album
Title	Year	US	US R&B/HH	AUS	CAN	UK	Certifications	Album
"Gang Gang" (with Sheck Wes)	2019	48	22	63	40	52	RIAA: Gold	JackBoys
"Out West" (with Travis Scott and Young Thug)	2019	38	15	79	29	—	RIAA: 3× Platinum; BPI: Silver	JackBoys
"What to Do?" (with Travis Scott and Don Toliver)	2019	56	26	86	38	57	RIAA: Platinum	JackBoys
"Gatti" (with Travis Scott and Pop Smoke)	2019	69	33	—	61	59	RIAA: 2× Platinum; BPI: Silver	JackBoys

== See also ==
- Opium (record label)
