= Don Toliver discography =

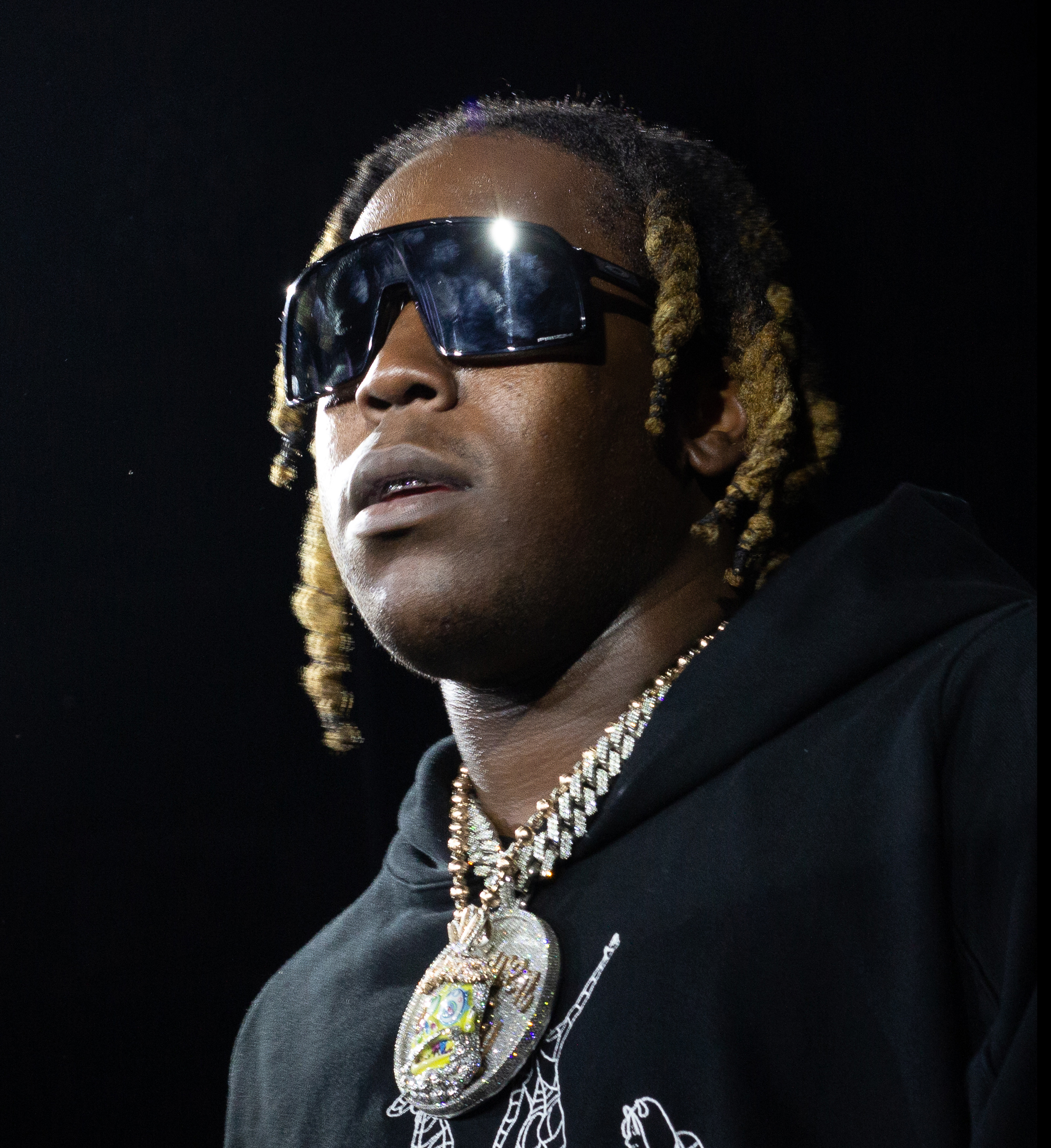
- Toliver in 2021
- Studio albums: 5
- Singles: 49
- Mixtapes: 1
- Collaborative mixtapes: 1
- Music videos: 17

The American rapper and singer Don Toliver has released five studio albums, one collaborative album, two mixtapes, and 49 singles (including eleven as a featured artist). In 2018, he was featured on his Cactus Jack Records label boss, Travis Scott's song, "Can't Say", which debuted and peaked at number 38 on the Billboard Hot 100, marking his first entrance to the charts. Toliver released his debut studio album, Heaven or Hell, on March 13, 2020. The album debuted and peaked at number seven on the Billboard 200. Later that year, he released a collaboration with Internet Money and Gunna titled "Lemonade", which features Nav and reached number six on the Hot 100, giving him his highest-charting song. In 2021, he was featured alongside Kid Cudi on Kanye West's song, "Moon", which debuted and peaked at number 17 on the Hot 100.

Toliver released his second studio album, Life of a Don, on October 8, 2021. The album debuted and peaked at number two on the Billboard 200. In 2022, he was featured on the songs "Too Many Nights" by Metro Boomin and Future and "Used" by SZA, which debuted and peaked at numbers 22 and 30 on the Billboard Hot 100, respectively. Toliver released his third studio album, Love Sick, on February 24, 2023. The album debuted and peaked at number eight on the Billboard 200. He released his fourth studio album, Hardstone Psycho, on June 14, 2024. The album debuted and peaked at number three on the Billboard 200. It produced the top-40 single "Bandit", which debuted and peaked at number 38 on the Billboard Hot 100. Toliver released his fifth studio album, Octane, on January 30, 2026. The album debuted and peaked atop the Billboard 200, giving him his first number-one album. The album debuted and peaked atop the Billboard 200, giving him his first number-one album. It produced the top-20 singles "Body" and "E85" (which peaked at numbers 14 and 15, respectively), and the top-40 singles "Tiramisu" and "ATM" (which peaked at numbers 35 and 25, respectively).

== Albums ==
=== Studio albums ===
List of studio albums, with selected details
Title	Details	Peak chart positions										Certifications
Title	Details	US	US R&B/HH	US Rap	AUS	CAN	DEN	NLD	NOR	NZ	UK	Certifications
Heaven or Hell	Released: March 13, 2020; Label: Cactus Jack, Atlantic, We Run It; Format: Streaming, digital download, vinyl	7	5	4	20	7	20	31	7	14	17	RIAA: Platinum; RMNZ: Platinum
Life of a Don	Released: October 8, 2021; Label: Cactus Jack, Atlantic, We Run It; Format: Streaming, digital download	2	2	2	17	6	13	16	9	13	26	RIAA: Gold; RMNZ: Gold
Love Sick	Released: February 24, 2023; Label: Cactus Jack, Atlantic; Format: Streaming, digital download, CD, vinyl	8	4	3	61	10	—	40	—	28	36	RIAA: Gold; MC: Platinum; RMNZ: Gold
Hardstone Psycho	Released: June 14, 2024; Label: Cactus Jack, Atlantic; Format: Streaming, digital download, CD, vinyl	3	1	1	16	7	19	14	7	6	27	RIAA: Gold; MC: Platinum; RMNZ: Gold
Octane	Released: January 30, 2026; Label: Cactus Jack, Atlantic; Format: Streaming, digital download, CD, vinyl	1	1	1	4	1	5	4	4	3	4	BPI: Silver; MC: Platinum; RMNZ: Gold
Nitrous	Scheduled: December 4, 2026; Label: Cactus Jack, Atlantic; Format: Streaming, digital download, CD, vinyl	To be released										
"—" denotes a recording that did not chart or was not released in that territory.

=== Collaborative albums ===
List of collaborative albums, with selected details
Title	Album details	Peak chart positions				
Title	Album details	US	AUS	BEL (FL)	CAN	NZ
JackBoys (as part of JackBoys)	Released: December 27, 2019; Label: Cactus Jack, Epic; Formats: CD, LP, cassette, digital download, streaming	1	5	19	1	5
JackBoys 2 (as part of JackBoys)	Released: July 13, 2025; Label: Cactus Jack, Epic; Formats: CD, LP, digital download, streaming	1	3	9	4	5

=== Remix albums ===
List of remix albums, with selected details
Title	Details
Heaven or Hell (Chopnotslop Remix)	Released: April 17, 2020; Label: Cactus Jack, Atlantic, We Run It; Formats: Streaming, digital download, vinyl

== Mixtapes ==
List of mixtapes, with selected details
Title	Details
Playa Familia (with YungJosh93)	Released: May 17, 2017; Label: Self-released; Formats: Digital download
Donny Womack	Released: August 2, 2018; Label: Self-released; Formats: Digital download

== Extended plays ==
List of extended plays, with selected details
Title	Details
Choptane (with DJ Candlestick)	Released: April 3, 2026; Label: Cactus Jack, Atlantic; Formats: Digital download

== Singles ==
=== As lead artist ===
List of singles, showing year released and album name
Title	Year	Peak chart positions										Certifications	Album
Title	Year	US	US R&B /HH	US Rap	AUS	CAN	IRE	NZ	SWE	UK	WW	Certifications	Album
"I Gotta"	2017	—	—	—	—	—	—	—	—	—	—		Non-album single
"Diva"	2017	—	—	—	—	—	—	—	—	—	—		Donny Womack
"Make Sumn"	2018	—	—	—	—	—	—	—	—	—	—		Non-album singles
"Situation"	2018	—	—	—	—	—	—	—	—	—	—		Non-album singles
"Backend"	2018	—	—	—	—	—	—	—	—	—	—		Donny Womack
"Holdin' Steel" (featuring Dice Soho)	2018	—	—	—	—	—	—	—	—	—	—		Donny Womack
"Run Up"	2018	—	—	—	—	—	—	—	—	—	—		Donny Womack
"Best You Had"	2019	—	—	—	—	—	—	—	—	—	—	MC: Gold	Non-album singles
"Back Up" (featuring Wiz Khalifa)	2019	—	—	—	—	—	—	—	—	—	—		Non-album singles
"No Idea"	2019	43	16	13	43	19	38	32	87	39	—	RIAA: 3× Platinum; ARIA: Platinum; BPI: Platinum; MC: 5× Platinum; RMNZ: 2× Platinum	Heaven or Hell (Note: "Had Enough" also appears on JackBoys.)
"Can't Feel My Legs"	2019	—	—	—	—	—	—	—	—	—	—		Heaven or Hell
"Had Enough" (featuring Quavo and Offset)	2019	52	23	19	—	42	—	—	— (Note: "Had Enough" did not enter the Swedish Singellista Chart, but peaked at number 14 on the Swedish Heatseeker Chart.)	60	—	RIAA: Gold; MC: Platinum; RMNZ: Gold	Heaven or Hell
"De La Hoya" (with Gianni)	2020	—	—	—	—	—	—	—	—	—	—		Non-album single
"After Party"	2020	57	23	20	34	35	24	38	— (Note: "After Party" did not enter the Swedish Singellista Chart, but peaked at number 15 on the Swedish Heatseeker Chart.)	47	—	RIAA: 3× Platinum; MC: 4× Platinum; BPI: Gold; RMNZ: 2× Platinum	Heaven or Hell
"Cafeteria" (with Chase B featuring Gunna)	2020	—	—	—	—	—	—	—	—	—	—		Escapism
"Clap"	2020	—	—	—	—	—	—	—	—	—	—		Road to Fast 9 Mixtape
"Lemonade" (with Internet Money and Gunna featuring Nav)	2020	6	3	3	5	3	3	2	3	1	4	RIAA: 4× Platinum; ARIA: 3× Platinum; MC: 4× Platinum; BPI: Platinum; RMNZ: 4× Platinum	B4 the Storm
"Mystery Lady" (with Masego)	2020	—	—	—	—	—	—	—	—	—	—	RIAA: Gold; MC: Gold; RMNZ: Platinum	Studying Abroad
"What You Need"	2021	82	34	—	—	87	—	— (Note: "What You Need" did not enter the NZ Top 40 Singles Chart, but peaked at number 26 on the NZ Hot Singles Chart.)	—	—	123	RIAA: Platinum; MC: Gold	Life of a Don
"Fast Lane" (with Lil Durk and Latto)	2021	—	—	—	—	—	—	—	—	—	—		F9: The Fast Saga (Original Motion Picture Soundtrack)
"Drugs n Hella Melodies" (featuring Kali Uchis)	2021	— (Note: "Drugs n Hella Melodies" did not enter the US Billboard Hot 100, but peaked at number 12 on the Bubbling Under Hot 100 chart.)	—	—	—	—	—	— (Note: "Drugs n Hella Melodies" did not enter the NZ Top 40 Singles Chart, but peaked at number 13 on the NZ Hot Singles Chart.)	—	—	—	RIAA: Platinum; MC: Gold	Life of a Don
"Don't Go" (with Skrillex and Justin Bieber)	2021	69	—	—	43	32	43	— (Note: "Don't Go" did not enter the NZ Top 40 Singles Chart, but peaked at number seven on the NZ Hot Singles Chart.)	67	56	38		Don't Get Too Close
"Way Bigger"	2021	— (Note: "Way Bigger" did not enter the US Billboard Hot 100, but peaked at number one on the Bubbling Under Hot 100 chart.)	39	—	—	—	—	—	—	—	198	RIAA: Gold; MC: Gold	Life of a Don
"Flocky Flocky" (featuring Travis Scott)	2021	53	15	11	—	44	99	— (Note: "Flocky Flocky" did not enter the NZ Top 40 Singles Chart, but peaked at number five on the NZ Hot Singles Chart.)	—	99	46	RIAA: Gold; MC: Gold	Life of a Don
"One Time" (with Nav featuring Future)	2022	— (Note: "One Time" did not enter the US Billboard Hot 100, but peaked at number five on the Bubbling Under Hot 100 chart.)	37	—	—	55	—	—	—	—	—		Demons Protected by Angels
"Do It Right"	2022	—	—	—	—	—	—	— (Note: "Do It Right" did not enter the NZ Top 40 Singles Chart, but peaked at number 16 on the NZ Hot Singles Chart.)	—	—	—		Love Sick
"4 Me" (featuring Kali Uchis)	2023	—	—	—	—	—	—	—	—	—	—		Love Sick
"Leave the Club" (featuring Lil Durk and GloRilla)	2023	— (Note: "Leave the Club" did not enter the US Billboard Hot 100, but peaked at number five on the Bubbling Under Hot 100 chart.)	43	—	—	—	—	—	—	—	—		Love Sick
"Private Landing" (featuring Justin Bieber and Future)	2023	72	25	14	—	58	78	— (Note: "Private Landing" did not enter the NZ Top 40 Singles Chart, but peaked at number nine on the NZ Hot Singles Chart.)	—	74	115	RIAA: Platinum; MC: 2× Platinum; RMNZ: Platinum	Love Sick
"Worth It" (with Offset)	2023	92	29	—	—	74	—	— (Note: "Worth It" did not enter the NZ Top 40 Singles Chart, but peaked at number four on the NZ Hot Singles Chart.)	—	52	128	RIAA: Gold	Set It Off
"Bandit"	2024	38	13	9	—	42	89	— (Note: "Bandit" did not enter the NZ Top 40 Singles Chart, but peaked at number 13 on the NZ Hot Singles Chart.)	—	63	61	RIAA: Platinum; MC: 2× Platinum; RMNZ: Gold	Hardstone Psycho
"Deep in the Water"	2024	— (Note: "Deep in the Water" did not enter the US Billboard Hot 100, but peaked at number six on the Bubbling Under Hot 100 chart.)	35	—	—	—	—	— (Note: "Deep in the Water" did not enter the NZ Top 40 Singles Chart, but peaked at number 11 on the NZ Hot Singles Chart.)	—	—	—		Hardstone Psycho
"Heavy Stunts" (with Yeat)	2024	—	47	—	—	—	—	— (Note: "Heavy Stunts" did not enter the NZ Top 40 Singles Chart, but peaked at number 21 on the NZ Hot Singles Chart.)	—	—	—		Non-album single
"Attitude" (featuring Charlie Wilson and Cash Cobain)	2024	58	16	14	—	82	—	— (Note: "Attitude" did not enter the NZ Top 40 Singles Chart, but peaked at number 20 on the NZ Hot Singles Chart.)	—	—	163	MC: Platinum	Hardstone Psycho
"Brother Stone" (featuring Kodak Black)	2024	61	18	16	—	59	—	— (Note: "Brother Stone" did not enter the NZ Top 40 Singles Chart, but peaked at number seven on the NZ Hot Singles Chart.)	—	—	121	MC: Gold	Hardstone Psycho
"New Drop"	2024	81	22	17	98	49	64	— (Note: "New Drop" did not enter the NZ Top 40 Singles Chart, but peaked at number 30 on the NZ Hot Singles Chart.)	—	64	131	ARIA: Platinum; MC: Platinum; RMNZ: Platinum	Hardstone Psycho
"No Pole"	2025	66	11	8	88	53	75	—	—	69	106	RIAA: 2× Platinum; ARIA: 2× Platinum; MC: 2× Platinum; RMNZ: 2× Platinum	Love Sick (Deluxe)
"LV Bag" (with Speedy and J-Hope featuring Pharrell Williams)	2025	83	27	15	—	95	—	— (Note: " LV Bag" did not enter the NZ Top 40 Singles Chart, but peaked at number eight on the NZ Hot Singles Chart.)	—	93	48		Non-album single
"Tore Up"	2025	78	23	20	—	70	—	— (Note: "Tore Up" did not enter the NZ Top 40 Singles Chart, but peaked at number nine on the NZ Hot Singles Chart.)	—	—	180	MC: Platinum	Hardstone Psycho
"Lose My Mind" (featuring Doja Cat)	2025	— (Note: "Lose My Mind" did not enter the US Billboard Hot 100, but peaked at number 11 on the Bubbling Under Hot 100 chart.)	—	—	—	62	73	— (Note: "Lose My Mind" did not enter the NZ Top 40 Singles Chart, but peaked at number 8 on the NZ Hot Singles Chart.)	—	85	38	MC: Gold; RMNZ: Gold	F1 the Album
"FWU" (with Mustard)	2025	82	19	12	—	82	—	— (Note: "FWU" did not enter the NZ Top 40 Singles Chart, but peaked at number 13 on the NZ Hot Singles Chart.)	—	—	176		Non-album single
"2000 Excursion" (with Travis Scott and Sheck Wes)	2025	72	24	12	—	78	—	— (Note: "2000 Excursion" did not enter the NZ Top 40 Singles Chart, but peaked at number nine on the NZ Hot Singles Chart.)	—	—	101		JackBoys 2
"Cannonball" (with Lithe)	2025	—	—	—	—	—	—	— (Note: "Cannonball" did not enter the NZ Top 40 Singles Chart, but peaked at number 11 on the NZ Hot Singles Chart.)	—	—	—		Euphoria
"No Comments"	2025	— (Note: "No Comments" did not enter the US Billboard Hot 100, but peaked at number 15 on the Bubbling Under Hot 100 chart.)	49	—	—	—	—	—	—	—	—		JackBoys 2
"Something Wrong" (with DJ Snake)	2025	—	—	—	—	—	—	— (Note: "Something Wrong" did not enter the NZ Top 40 Singles Chart, but peaked at number 10 on the NZ Hot Singles Chart.)	—	—	—		Nomad
"Tiramisu"	2025	35	12	6	—	47	—	— (Note: "Tiramisu" did not enter the NZ Top 40 Singles Chart, but peaked at number eight on the NZ Hot Singles Chart.)	—	—	62	MC: Platinum	Octane
"3am" (with Loe Shimmy)	2025	71	14	9	—	—	—	— (Note: "3am" did not enter the NZ Top 40 Singles Chart, but peaked at number 39 on the NZ Hot Singles Chart.)	—	—	—		Rockstar Junkie
"Satellite" (with Chase B and SoFaygo)	2025	—	—	—	—	—	—	— (Note: "Satellite" did not enter the NZ Top 40 Singles Chart, but peaked at number 13 on the NZ Hot Singles Chart.)	—	—	—		Be Very Afraid (Vol. 1)
"ATM"	2026	25	8	4	79	29	—	— (Note: "ATM" did not enter the NZ Top 40 Singles Chart, but peaked at number three on the NZ Hot Singles Chart.)	—	—	36	MC: Gold	Octane
"Body"	2026	14	3	1	—	21	58	— (Note: "Body" did not enter the NZ Top 40 Singles Chart, but peaked at number three on the NZ Hot Singles Chart.)	—	45	20	MC: Platinum; RMNZ: Gold	Octane
"Creepin"	2026	—	—	—	—	—	—	—	—	—	—		Scream 7 (soundtrack)
"E85"	2026	15	3	1	—	18	55	31	—	44	29	MC: 2× Platinum; RMNZ: Gold	Octane
"Tuition" (solo or remix with Lil Baby)	2026	60	22	18	—	—	—	—	—	—	—		Octane
"Party with the Boys"	2026	—	—	—	—	—	73	— (Note: "Party with the Boys" did not enter the NZ Top 40 Singles Chart, but peaked at number 3 on the NZ Hot Singles Chart.)	—	94	—		Nitrous
"—" denotes a recording that did not chart or was not released in that territory.

=== As featured artist ===
List of singles, showing year released and album name
Title	Year	Peak chart positions								Certifications	Album
Title	Year	US	US R&B /HH	US Rap	CAN	CRI Ang. Air.	NZ Hot	UK	WW	Certifications	Album
"My Love" (Jack Gilinsky featuring Don Toliver)	2020	—	—	—	—	—	—	—	—		Non-album single
"Don't Like Me" (Rico Nasty featuring Gucci Mane and Don Toliver)	2020	—	—	—	—	—	—	—	—		Nightmare Vacation
"His & Hers" (Internet Money and Gunna featuring Don Toliver and Lil Uzi Vert)	2021	67	34	—	53	—	9	—	74	RIAA: Gold; RMNZ: Gold	Non-album single
"Honest" (Justin Bieber featuring Don Toliver)	2022	44	—	—	21	—	4	54	24		Non-album single
"Scrape It Off" (Pusha T featuring Lil Uzi Vert and Don Toliver)	2022	59	17	14	41	—	7	—	80		It's Almost Dry
"Ain't Safe" (Trippie Redd featuring Don Toliver)	2022	92	25	17	—	—	10	—	—		Non-album singles
"Hardcore" (Zack Bia featuring Don Toliver)	2023	—	—	—	—	—	—	—	—		Non-album singles
"Soweto" (Victony, Rema, and Tempoe featuring Don Toliver)	2023	—	—	—	76	—	—	65	—	BPI: Gold	Non-album singles
"Ring Ring" (Chase B featuring Travis Scott, Don Toliver, Quavo, and Ty Dolla Sign)	2023	—	—	—	—	—	11	—	—		Non-album singles
"Precision" (SoFaygo featuring Don Toliver)	2024	—	—	—	—	—	—	—	—		Non-album singles
"Hide It" (Wiz Khalifa featuring Don Toliver)	2024	—	—	—	—	—	29	—	—		Kush & Orange Juice 2
"Every Night" (Offset featuring Don Toliver)	2026	—	32	23	—	14	35	—	—		GMFU
"Cold Shoulder" (Drake featuring Don Toliver and Yebba)	2026	18	4	2	7	—	3	36	22		Habibti (FOMO)
"—" denotes a recording that did not chart or was not released in that territory.

== Other charted songs ==
List of other charted songs, showing year released and album name
Title	Year	Peak chart positions										Certifications	Album
Title	Year	US	US R&B /HH	US Rap	AUS	CAN	FRA	IRE	NZ	UK	WW	Certifications	Album
"Can't Say" (Travis Scott featuring Don Toliver)	2018	38	24	21	—	35	128	—	—	—	—	RIAA: 4× Platinum; ARIA: Platinum; BPI: Gold; MC: 3× Platinum	Astroworld
"What to Do?" (JackBoys and Travis Scott featuring Don Toliver)	2019	56	26	20	86	38	102	64	—	57	—	RIAA: Platinum; MC: Gold	JackBoys
"No Regrets" (Eminem featuring Don Toliver)	2020	84	43	—	—	53	—	—	—	—	—		Music to Be Murdered By
"Euphoria" (featuring Travis Scott and Kaash Paige)	2020	— (Note: "Euphoria" did not enter the US Billboard Hot 100, but peaked at number three on the Bubbling Under Hot 100 chart.)	—	—	—	—	—	—	— (Note: "Euphoria" did not enter the NZ Top 40 Singles Chart, but peaked at number 15 on the NZ Hot Singles Chart.)	—	—	RIAA: Gold	Heaven or Hell
"Cardigan"	2020	90	—	—	—	—	—	91	— (Note: "Cardigan" did not enter the NZ Top 40 Singles Chart, but peaked at number 12 on the NZ Hot Singles Chart.)	—	—	RIAA: Platinum; MC: 2× Platinum; RMNZ: Platinum	Heaven or Hell
"Wasted"	2020	—	—	—	—	—	—	—	— (Note: "Wasted" did not enter the NZ Top 40 Singles Chart, but peaked at number 12 on the NZ Hot Singles Chart.)	—	—		Heaven or Hell
"Recap" (Nav featuring Don Toliver)	2020	—	—	—	—	76	—	—	— (Note: "Recap" did not enter the NZ Top 40 Singles Chart, but peaked at number 26 on the NZ Hot Singles Chart.)	—	—		Good Intentions
"Moon" (Kanye West featuring Don Toliver and Kid Cudi)	2021	17	7	7	15	21	103	36	9	83	20	RIAA: Platinum; MC: Gold	Donda
"Cocoa" (Baby Keem featuring Don Toliver)	2021	—	—	—	—	—	—	—	— (Note: "Cocoa" did not enter the NZ Top 40 Singles Chart, but peaked at number 29 on the NZ Hot Singles Chart.)	—	—		The Melodic Blue
"Xscape"	2021	— (Note: "Xscape" did not enter the US Billboard Hot 100, but peaked at number 10 on the Bubbling Under Hot 100 chart.)	—	—	—	—	—	—	— (Note: "Xscape" did not enter the NZ Top 40 Singles Chart, but peaked at number 17 on the NZ Hot Singles Chart.)	—	—		Life of a Don
"5X"	2021	— (Note: "5X" did not enter the US Billboard Hot 100, but peaked at number nine on the Bubbling Under Hot 100 chart.)	—	—	—	—	—	—	— (Note: "5X" did not enter the NZ Top 40 Singles Chart, but peaked at number 20 on the NZ Hot Singles Chart.)	—	—		Life of a Don
"Swangin' on Westheimer"	2021	— (Note: "Swangin' on Westheimer" did not enter the US Billboard Hot 100, but peaked at number 25 on the Bubbling Under Hot 100 chart.)	—	—	—	—	—	—	—	—	—	RIAA: Gold	Life of a Don
"You" (featuring Travis Scott)	2021	— (Note: "You" did not enter the US Billboard Hot 100, but peaked at number 17 on the Bubbling Under Hot 100 chart.)	—	—	—	—	—	—	— (Note: "You" did not enter the NZ Top 40 Singles Chart, but peaked at number 14 on the NZ Hot Singles Chart.)	—	—	RIAA: Platinum; MC: Gold	Life of a Don
"Let's Pray" (DJ Khaled featuring Don Toliver and Travis Scott)	2022	86	28	—	—	75	—	—	—	—	—		God Did
"Somewhere to Fly" (with Kid Cudi)	2022	—	—	—	—	—	—	—	— (Note: "Somewhere to Fly" did not enter the NZ Top 40 Singles Chart, but peaked at number 29 on the NZ Hot Singles Chart.)	—	—		Entergalactic
"Killstreaks" (Baby Keem featuring Don Toliver and PinkPantheress)	2022	—	—	—	—	—	—	—	— (Note: "Killstreaks" did not enter the NZ Top 40 Singles Chart, but peaked at number 40 on the NZ Hot Singles Chart.)	—	—		The Melodic Blue (Deluxe)
"Too Many Nights" (Metro Boomin and Future featuring Don Toliver)	2022	22	6	5	55	12	107	59	28	84	23	RIAA: 3× Platinum; ARIA: 2× Platinum; BPI: Platinum; MC: Platinum; RMNZ: Platinum	Heroes & Villains
"Around Me" (Metro Boomin featuring Don Toliver)	2022	53	20	13	—	35	180	—	—	—	56	ARIA: Gold; MC: Gold; RMNZ: Gold	Heroes & Villains
"I Can't Save You (Interlude)" (Metro Boomin and Future featuring Don Toliver)	2022	55	21	15	—	45	—	—	—	—	69		Heroes & Villains
"Used" (SZA featuring Don Toliver)	2022	30	12	—	50	35	—	—	—	—	34	RIAA: Platinum; MC: Platinum; RMNZ: Gold	SOS
"Embarrassed" (featuring Travis Scott)	2023	— (Note: "Embarrassed" did not enter the US Billboard Hot 100, but peaked at number 11 on the Bubbling Under Hot 100 chart.)	40	24	—	—	—	—	— (Note: "Embarrassed" did not enter the NZ Top 40 Singles Chart, but peaked at number 18 on the NZ Hot Singles Chart.)	—	—	MC: Platinum	Love Sick (Deluxe)
"Fantasy" (Kali Uchis featuring Don Toliver)	2023	—	—	—	—	—	—	—	— (Note: "Fantasy" did not enter the NZ Top 40 Singles Chart, but peaked at number 28 on the NZ Hot Singles Chart.)	—	—		Red Moon in Venus
"Link Up" (with Metro Boomin and Wizkid featuring Beam and Toian)	2023	— (Note: "Link Up" did not enter the US Billboard Hot 100, but peaked at number three on the Bubbling Under Hot 100 chart.)	—	—	—	69	—	—	—	—	167		Spider-Man: Across the Spider-Verse (Soundtrack from and Inspired by the Motion Picture)
"Home" (with Metro Boomin and Lil Uzi Vert)	2023	— (Note: "Home" did not enter the US Billboard Hot 100, but peaked at number one on the Bubbling Under Hot 100 chart.)	39	—	—	79	—	—	—	—	195		Spider-Man: Across the Spider-Verse (Soundtrack from and Inspired by the Motion Picture)
"Givin' Up (Not the One)" (with 21 Savage and 2 Chainz)	2023	— (Note: "Givin' Up (Not the One)" did not enter the US Billboard Hot 100, but peaked at number seven on the Bubbling Under Hot 100 chart.)	45	—	—	87	—	—	—	—	—		Spider-Man: Across the Spider-Verse (Soundtrack from and Inspired by the Motion Picture)
"Patience" (Lil Uzi Vert featuring Don Toliver)	2023	70	28	23	—	—	—	—	—	—	—		Pink Tape
"Feel a Way" (Kaytranada featuring Don Toliver)	2024	—	—	—	—	—	—	—	— (Note: "Feel a Way" did not enter the NZ Top 40 Singles Chart, but peaked at number 31 on the NZ Hot Singles Chart.)	—	—		Timeless
"Kryptonite"	2024	98	29	25	—	96	—	—	— (Note: "Kryptonite" did not enter the NZ Top 40 Singles Chart, but peaked at number 14 on the NZ Hot Singles Chart.)	—	—	MC: Gold	Hardstone Psycho
"Glock"	2024	— (Note: "Glock" did not enter the US Billboard Hot 100, but peaked at number 16 on the Bubbling Under Hot 100 chart.)	39	—	—	—	—	—	—	—	—		Hardstone Psycho
"Ice Age" (featuring Travis Scott)	2024	92	28	24	—	—	—	—	— (Note: "Ice Age" did not enter the NZ Top 40 Singles Chart, but peaked at number 16 on the NZ Hot Singles Chart.)	—	—		Hardstone Psycho
"4x4"	2024	— (Note: "4x4" did not enter the US Billboard Hot 100, but peaked at number 24 on the Bubbling Under Hot 100 chart.)	42	—	—	—	—	—	—	—	—		Hardstone Psycho
"Purple Rain" (featuring Future and Metro Boomin)	2024	— (Note: "Purple Rain" did not enter the US Billboard Hot 100, but peaked at number nine on the Bubbling Under Hot 100 chart.)	34	—	—	—	—	—	—	—	—		Hardstone Psycho
"Backstreets" (featuring Teezo Touchdown)	2024	—	49	—	—	—	—	—	—	—	—		Hardstone Psycho
"Field Trip" (with Kanye West and Ty Dolla Sign as ¥$ and Playboi Carti featuring Kodak Black)	2024	48	10	8	88	41	—	—	— (Note: "Field Trip" did not enter the NZ Top 40 Singles Chart, but peaked at number three on the NZ Hot Singles Chart.)	65	33		Vultures 2
"I Can't Let Go" (with Lil Tecca)	2024	— (Note: "I Can't Let Go" did not enter the US Billboard Hot 100, but peaked at number 18 on the Bubbling Under Hot 100 chart.)	50	—	—	—	—	—	— (Note: "I Can't Let Go" did not enter the NZ Top 40 Singles Chart, but peaked at number nine on the NZ Hot Singles Chart.)	—	—		Plan A
"Joni" (SZA featuring Don Toliver)	2025	—	—	—	—	—	—	—	— (Note: "Joni" did not enter the NZ Top 40 Singles Chart, but peaked at number 35 on the NZ Hot Singles Chart.)	—	—		Lana
"Champain & Vacay" (with Travis Scott)	2025	53	13	7	78	55	—	94	— (Note: "Champain & Vacay" did not enter the NZ Top 40 Singles Chart, but peaked at number seven on the NZ Hot Singles Chart.)	60	49		JackBoys 2
"Velour" (with Sheck Wes)	2025	— (Note: "Velour" did not enter the US Billboard Hot 100, but peaked at number 12 on the Bubbling Under Hot 100 chart.)	45	—	—	—	—	—	—	—	—		JackBoys 2
"2Tone" (with Yeat)	2025	—	—	—	—	—	—	—	— (Note: "2Tone" did not enter the NZ Top 40 Singles Chart, but peaked at number 24 on the NZ Hot Singles Chart.)	—	—		Dangerous Summer
"FaceTime" (with Lithe)	2025	—	—	—	—	—	—	—	— (Note: "2Tone" did not enter the NZ Top 40 Singles Chart, but peaked at number 30 on the NZ Hot Singles Chart.)	—	—		Euphoria
"Rendezvous" (featuring Yeat)	2026	30	10	6	—	40	—	—	—	—	49	MC: Gold	Octane
"Secondhand" (featuring Rema)	2026	29	9	5	—	32	—	65	— (Note: "Secondhand" did not enter the NZ Top 40 Singles Chart, but peaked at number five on the NZ Hot Singles Chart.)	51	39	MC: Gold	Octane
"Long Way to Calabasas"	2026	63	23	—	—	77	—	—	—	—	185		Octane
"Rosary" (featuring Travis Scott)	2026	36	13	9	—	45	—	—	— (Note: "Rosary" did not enter the NZ Top 40 Singles Chart, but peaked at number six on the NZ Hot Singles Chart.)	—	65		Octane
"All the Signs" (featuring Teezo Touchdown)	2026	59	21	17	—	—	—	—	—	—	—		Octane
"Call Back"	2026	41	15	10	—	53	—	—	—	—	74	MC: Gold	Octane
"K9" (featuring SahBabii)	2026	64	24	19	—	84	—	—	—	—	—		Octane
"Excavator"	2026	48	17	12	—	64	—	—	—	—	123	MC: Gold	Octane
"Gemstone"	2026	44	16	11	—	65	—	—	—	—	103	MC: Gold	Octane
"Opposite"	2026	49	18	13	—	62	—	—	—	—	131		Octane
"TMU"	2026	70	27	22	—	90	—	—	—	—	—		Octane
"Pleasure's Mine"	2026	82	31	25	—	—	—	—	—	—	—		Octane
"Sweet Home"	2026	78	29	24	—	—	—	—	—	—	—		Octane
"Griddle" (with Yeat)	2026	97	27	21	—	89	—	—	— (Note: "Griddle" did not enter the NZ Top 40 Singles Chart, but peaked at number 12 on the NZ Hot Singles Chart.)	—	—		ADL
"OK" (Kanye West featuring Don Toliver)	2026	— (Note: "OK" did not enter the Billboard Hot 100, but peaked at number four on the Bubbling Under Hot 100 chart.)	32	21	—	—	—	—	— (Note: "OK" did not enter the NZ Top 40 Singles chart, but peaked at 3 on the NZ Hot Singles Chart.)	—	—		Bully - Deluxe
"Solar Eclipse" (Drake featuring Don Toliver)	2026	5	1	—	48	—	—	48	36	22	8		Habibti (FOMO)
"—" denotes a recording that did not chart or was not released in that territory.

== Guest appearances ==
List of non-single guest appearances, with other performing artists, showing year released and album name
Title	Year	Other artist	Album
"Can't Say"	2018	Travis Scott	Astroworld
"What to Do?"	2019	JackBoys, Travis Scott	JackBoys
"No Regrets"	2020	Eminem	Music to Be Murdered By
"Recap"	2020	Nav	Good Intentions
"Grammy Week"	2020	Kaash Paige	Teenage Fever
"Replace Me"	2020	Nas, Big Sean	King's Disease
"For You"	2020	IV Jay	5th Element
"That Bag"	2020	Greedy Macc, Silk the Prince	Mouth Piece
"Dawn Toliver"	2021	Drakeo the Ruler, Ketchy the Great	The Truth Hurts
"No Surprise"	2021	YSL Records, Young Thug, BSlime	Slime Language 2
"Won't Stop"	2021	—N/a	Gully Soundtrack
"Moon"	2021	Kanye West, Kid Cudi	Donda
"Cocoa"	2021	Baby Keem	The Melodic Blue
"Believe"	2021	Maxo Kream	Weight of the World
"Let's Pray"	2022	DJ Khaled, Travis Scott	God Did
"Psane"	2022	Pi'erre Bourne	Good Movie
"Somewhere to Fly"	2022	Kid Cudi	Entergalactic
"Burrow"	2022	Kid Cudi, Steve Aoki, Dot da Genius	Entergalactic
"Killstreaks"	2022	Baby Keem, PinkPantheress	The Melodic Blue (Deluxe)
"Slip"	2022	SoFaygo	Pink Heartz
"Special"	2022	Wizkid	More Love, Less Ego
"Too Many Nights"	2022	Metro Boomin, Future	Heroes & Villains
"Around Me"	2022	Metro Boomin	Heroes & Villains
"I Can't Save You (Interlude)"	2022	Metro Boomin, Future	Heroes & Villains
"Used"	2022	SZA	SOS
"Fantasy"	2023	Kali Uchis	Red Moon in Venus
"Temporary"	2023	6lack	Since I Have a Lover
"Link Up"	2023	Metro Boomin, Wizkid, Beam, Toian	Spider-Man: Across the Spider-Verse (Soundtrack from and Inspired by the Motion Picture)
"Home"	2023	Metro Boomin, Lil Uzi Vert	Spider-Man: Across the Spider-Verse (Soundtrack from and Inspired by the Motion Picture)
"Givin' Up (Not the One)"	2023	21 Savage, 2 Chainz	Spider-Man: Across the Spider-Verse (Soundtrack from and Inspired by the Motion Picture)
"Deep End"	2023	Doe Boy	Beezy
"Patience"	2023	Lil Uzi Vert	Pink Tape
"Purple Heart"	2023	Odetari	Door to Dusk
"Coming Home"	2023	Currensy, Trauma Tone	Highway 600
"Feel a Way"	2024	Kaytranada	Timeless
"Field Trip"	2024	¥$ (Kanye West, Ty Dolla Sign), Playboi Carti, Kodak Black	Vultures 2
"SlizzyHunchoDon"	2024	Cash Cobain, Quavo	Play Cash Cobain
"Madonna"	2024	Toro y Moi	Hole Erth
"Undercurrent"	2024	Toro y Moi, Porches	Hole Erth
"I Can't Let Go"	2024	Lil Tecca	Plan A
"New High"	2024	Yeat	Lyfestyle
"Love Letter"	2024	TisaKorean	In Silly We Trust
"Confused"	2024	Hunxho	Thank God
"Joni"	2025	SZA	Lana
"You"	2025	Nav	OMW2 Rexdale
"Flames of Fortune"	2025	Ludwig Göransson	Sinners (Original Motion Picture Soundtrack)
"100 Bags"	2025	Larry June, Cardo	Until Night Comes
"Champain & Vacay"	2025	Travis Scott	JackBoys 2
"Velour"	2025	Sheck Wes	JackBoys 2
"Cant Stop"	2025	Future, Wallie the Sensei	JackBoys 2
"2tone"	2025	Yeat	Dangerous Summer
"What We On"	2025	JID	God Does Like Ugly
"Who You Seeing Tonight"	2025	Kodak Black	Just Getting Started
"Facetime"	2025	Lithe	Euphoria
"Fragments"	2026	Joji	Piss in the Wind
"Griddle"	2026	Yeat	ADL
"Circles" (Note: Don Toliver's vocals would be removed after an update.)	2026	Kanye West	Bully
"OK"	2026	Kanye West	Bully (Deluxe)
