= Octane World Tour =

2026 concert tour by Don Toliver

- Tour by Don Toliver
- Location: North America, Europe
- Associated album: Octane
- Start date: May 8, 2026
- End date: November 24, 2026
- Legs: 2
- No. of shows: 70 in total
- Supporting acts: SahBabii; SoFaygo; Chase B
- Producer: Live Nation

Don Toliver concert chronology
- Psycho Tour (2024-2025); Octane World Tour (2026)

The Octane World Tour is the ongoing fourth concert tour and second arena tour by American rapper and singer Don Toliver, in support of his fifth studio album, Octane (2026). Announced on February 3, 2026, via Instagram, the tour is promoted by Live Nation and is set to visit major cities across North America and Europe.

Marketed as "Phase 1", the original part of the tour focuses on North America, running from May to July 2026. This first leg comprises 33 shows, beginning on May 8, 2026, at Rolling Loud in Orlando, Florida, and concluding in Denver, Colorado on July 5, 2026.

On June 22, 2026, Don Toliver announced an additional 37 dates for the tour, including 18 in Europe, extending the run across the Atlantic. "Leg 2" will start in Sacramento, California on August 4, 2026 and will conclude on November 24, 2026 in London, United Kingdom.

== Setlist ==
1. "E85"
2. "Opposite"
3. "Secondhand"
4. "Rendezvous"
5. "ATM"
6. "Call Back"
7. "Cardigan"
8. "No Idea"
9. "You"
10. "Body"
11. "Gemstone"
12. "Excavator"
13. "Tore Up"
14. "New Drop"
15. "K9"
16. "Private Landing"
17. "FWU"
18. "Lemonade
19. "Bus Stop"
20. "Slow Motion"
21. "3am"
22. "Swangin' On Westheimer"
23. "TMU"
24. "Pleasure's Mine"
25. "Tiramisu"
26. "Tuition"
27. "No Pole"
28. "Too Many Nights"
29. "Can't Say"
30. "Bandit"
31. "After Party"
32. "E85"

=== Additional notes ===
- June 1, 2026 - New York City: "K9" with SahBabii, "Used" with SZA, "That's My Baby" with Peso Pluma, "Mo Bamba" and "Gang Gang" with Sheck Wes, "Chest Pain (I Love)" and "E85" with Malcolm Todd.

== Tour dates ==
List of 2026 concerts
Date (2026)	City	Country	Venue	Opening act	Attendance	Revenue
Phase 1
May 8 (Note: Part of the Rolling Loud)	Orlando	United States	Camping World Stadium	—N/a	—N/a	—N/a
May 12	Tulsa	United States	BOK Center	SahBabii; SoFaygo; Chase B	—	—
May 14	Houston	United States	Toyota Center	SahBabii; SoFaygo; Chase B	—	—
May 17	Columbia	United States	Colonial Life Arena	SahBabii; SoFaygo; Chase B	—	—
May 19	Atlanta	United States	State Farm Arena	SahBabii; SoFaygo; Chase B	—	—
May 21	Charlotte	United States	Spectrum Center	SahBabii; SoFaygo; Chase B	—	—
May 23	Pittsburgh	United States	PPG Paints Arena	SahBabii; SoFaygo; Chase B	—	—
May 24	Philadelphia	United States	Xfinity Mobile Arena	SahBabii; SoFaygo; Chase B	—	—
May 26	Belmont Park	United States	UBS Arena	SahBabii; SoFaygo; Chase B	—	—
May 27	Newark	United States	Prudential Center	SahBabii; SoFaygo; Chase B	—	—
May 29	Hartford	United States	PeoplesBank Arena	SahBabii; SoFaygo; Chase B	—	—
May 30	Boston	United States	TD Garden	SahBabii; SoFaygo; Chase B	—	—
June 1	New York	United States	Madison Square Garden	SahBabii; SoFaygo; Chase B	—	—
June 2	Baltimore	United States	CFG Bank Arena	SahBabii; SoFaygo; Chase B	—	—
June 4	Detroit	United States	Little Caesars Arena	SahBabii; SoFaygo; Chase B	—	—
June 5	Toronto	Canada	Scotiabank Arena	SahBabii; SoFaygo; Chase B	—	—
June 7	Montreal	Canada	Centre Bell	SahBabii; SoFaygo; Chase B	—	—
June 9	Columbus	United States	Nationwide Arena	SahBabii; SoFaygo; Chase B	—	—
June 11	Chicago	United States	United Center	SahBabii; SoFaygo; Chase B	—	—
June 13	Dallas	United States	American Airlines Center	SahBabii; SoFaygo; Chase B	—	—
June 14	San Antonio	United States	Frost Bank Center	SahBabii; SoFaygo; Chase B	—	—
June 17	Kansas City	United States	T-Mobile Center	SahBabii; SoFaygo; Chase B	—	—
June 19 (Note: Part of the Summerfest)	Milwaukee	United States	American Family Insurance Amphitheater	—N/a	—N/a	—N/a
June 20	Minneapolis	United States	Target Center	SahBabii; SoFaygo; Chase B	—	—
June 24	Seattle	United States	Climate Pledge Arena	SahBabii; SoFaygo; Chase B	—	—
June 25	Vancouver	Canada	Rogers Arena	SahBabii; SoFaygo; Chase B	—	—
June 27	Oakland	United States	Oakland Arena	SahBabii; SoFaygo; Chase B	—	—
June 28	Los Angeles	United States	Crypto.com Arena	SahBabii	—	—
June 29	Los Angeles	United States	Crypto.com Arena	SahBabii; SoFaygo; Chase B	—	—
June 30	San Diego	United States	Pechanga Arena	SahBabii; SoFaygo; Chase B	—	—
July 1	Phoenix	United States	Mortgage Matchup Center	SahBabii; SoFaygo; Chase B	—	—
July 3	Las Vegas	United States	MGM Grand Garden Arena	SahBabii; SoFaygo; Chase B	—	—
July 5	Denver	United States	Ball Arena	SahBabii; SoFaygo; Chase B	—	—
Phase 2
August 4	Sacramento	United States	Golden 1 Center		—	—
August 6	Glendale	United States	Desert Diamond Arena		—	—
August 9	Austin	United States	Moody Center		—	—
August 11	Houston	United States	Toyota Center		—	—
August 13	Dallas	United States	American Airlines Center		—	—
August 15	Birmingham	United States	Legacy Arena		—	—
August 18	Atlanta	United States	State Farm Arena		—	—
August 19	Nashville	United States	Bridgestone Arena		—	—
August 21	Orlando	United States	Kia Center		—	—
August 22	Miami	United States	Kaseya Center		—	—
August 24	Greensboro	United States	First Horizon Coliseum		—	—
August 26	Indianapolis	United States	Gainbridge Fieldhouse		—	—
August 28	Rosemont	United States	Allstate Arena		—	—
August 31	Toronto	United States	Scotiabank Arena		—	—
August 29	Cleveland	United States	Rocket Arena		—	—
September 2	University Park	United States	Bryce Jordan Center		—	—
September 3	Philadelphia	United States	Xfinity Mobile Arena		—	—
September 5	Boston	United States	TD Garden		—	—
September 6	Brooklyn	United States	Barclays Center		—	—
October 25	Paris	France	Accor Arena	Victony	—	—
October 26	Zurich	Switzerland	Hallenstadion	Victony	—	—
October 27	Assago (Note: Labeled as Milan in promotional material)	Italy	Unipol Forum	Victony	—	—
October 29	Munich	Germany	Olympiahalle	Victony	—	—
October 30	Prague	Czech Republic	O_{2} Arena	Victony	—	—
October 31	Frankfurt	Germany	Festhalle	Victony	—	—
November 2	Berlin	Germany	Uber Arena	Victony	—	—
November 3	Łódź	Poland	Atlas Arena	Victony	—	—
November 5	Amsterdam	Netherlands	Ziggo Dome	Victony	—	—
November 6	Hamburg	Germany	Barclays Arena	Victony	—	—
November 8	Bærum (Note: Labeled as Oslo in promotional material)	Norway	Unity Arena	Victony	—	—
November 10	Stockholm	Sweden	Avicii Arena	Victony	—	—
November 12	Düsseldorf	Germany	PSD Bank Dome	Victony	—	—
November 16	Dublin	Ireland	3Arena	Victony	—	—
November 18	Leeds	England	First Direct Arena	Victony	—	—
November 19	Birmingham	England	Utilita Arena	Victony	—	—
November 22	Manchester	England	Co-op Live	Victony	—	—
November 24	London	England	The O_{2} Arena	Victony	—	—
