= Love Sick Tour =

2023 concert tour by Don Toliver

- Tour by Don Toliver
- Location: North America; Europe
- Associated album: Love Sick
- Start date: June 18, 2023
- End date: October 22, 2023
- Legs: 2
- No. of shows: 33
- Supporting act: Pi'erre Bourne
- Producer: Live Nation

Don Toliver concert chronology
- Life of a Don Tour (2021); Love Sick Tour (2023); Psycho Tour (2024-2025)

The Love Sick Tour was the second concert tour by American rapper and singer Don Toliver, launched in support of his third studio album, Love Sick (2023). The tour was officially announced on April 4, 2023, via the artist’s Instagram account and was promoted by Live Nation.

Spanning two continents, the tour visited North America and Europe, comprising 33 shows across two legs. It began on June 18, 2023, at the Fillmore Auditorium in Denver and concluded on October 22, 2023, at Amager Bio in Copenhagen.

== Setlist ==
1. "Geronimo"
2. "I Can't Save You"
3. "Cardigan"
4. "Embarrassed"
5. "Had Enough"
6. "Let Her Go"
7. "What You Need"
8. "What to Do?"
9. "Do It Right"
10. "5X"
11. "Way Bigger"
12. "Backend"
13. "Honeymoon"
14. "Luckily I'm Having"
15. "Company Pt. 3"
16. "Swangin' On Westheimer"
17. "Used"
18. "No Pole"
19. "Psane"
20. "Best You Had"
21. "Can't Say"
22. "Bus Stop"
23. "Smoke"
24. "Gang Gang"
25. "Lemonade"
26. "Around Me"
27. "Too Many Nights"
28. "Go Down"
29. "Private Landing"
30. "No Idea"
31. "If I Had"
32. "After Party"
33. "Can't Feel My Legs"

== Tour dates ==
List of 2023 concerts
Date	City	Country	Venue	Opening act	Attendance	Revenue
Leg 1 — North America
June 18, 2023	Denver	United States	Fillmore Auditorium	Pi'erre Bourne	—	—
June 20, 2023	Chicago	United States	Aragon Ballroom	Pi'erre Bourne	—	—
June 22, 2023	Toronto	Canada	RBC Echo Beach	Pi'erre Bourne	—	—
June 23, 2023	Sterling Heights	United States	Michigan Lottery Amphitheatre	Pi'erre Bourne	—	—
June 25, 2023	Boston	United States	MGM Music Hall at Fenway	Pi'erre Bourne	—	—
June 27, 2023	New York City	United States	The Rooftop at Pier 17	Pi'erre Bourne	—	—
June 28, 2023	Philadelphia	United States	Skyline Stage at the Mann Center	Pi'erre Bourne	—	—
June 29, 2023	New York City	United States	The Theater at Madison Square Garden	Pi'erre Bourne	—	—
July 1, 2023	Washington, D.C.	United States	The Anthem	Pi'erre Bourne	—	—
July 2, 2023	Raleigh	United States	Red Hat Amphitheater	Pi'erre Bourne	—	—
July 4, 2023	Charlotte	United States	Skyla Credit Union Amphitheatre	Pi'erre Bourne	—	—
July 5, 2023	Atlanta	United States	Coca-Cola Roxy	Pi'erre Bourne	—	—
July 6, 2023	New Orleans	United States	The Fillmore	Pi'erre Bourne	—	—
July 8, 2023	Houston	United States	713 Music Hall	Pi'erre Bourne	—	—
July 9, 2023	Irving	United States	Toyota Music Factory	Pi'erre Bourne	—	—
July 11, 2023	Austin	United States	Moody Amphitheater	Pi'erre Bourne	—	—
July 13, 2023	Phoenix	United States	Arizona Financial Theatre	Pi'erre Bourne	—	—
July 14, 2023	Inglewood (Note: Labeled as Los Angeles in promotional material)	United States	YouTube Theater	Pi'erre Bourne	—	—
July 16, 2023	San Francisco	United States	Masonic Auditorium	Pi'erre Bourne	—	—
July 23, 2023 (Note: Part of the Rolling Loud)	Miami Gardens	United States	Hard Rock Stadium	—N/a	—N/a	—N/a
Leg 2 — Europe
October 6, 2023	Bristol	England	O2 Academy Bristol	—	—	—
October 7, 2023	London	England	OVO Arena Wembley	—	—	—
October 9, 2023	Glasgow	Scotland	O2 Academy Glasgow	—	—	—
October 10, 2023	Dublin	Ireland	3Olympia Theatre	—	—	—
October 12, 2023	Birmingham	England	O2 Academy Birmingham	—	—	—
October 13, 2023	Manchester	England	O2 Victoria Warehouse	—	—	—
October 15, 2023	Paris	France	Bataclan	—	—	—
October 16, 2023	Brussels	Belgium	La Madeleine	—	—	—
October 17, 2023	Zurich	Switzerland	X-Tra	—	—	—
October 19, 2023	Berlin	Germany	Tempodrom	—	—	—
October 20, 2023	Cologne	Germany	Carlswerk Victoria	—	—	—
October 21, 2023	Tilburg	Netherlands	Poppodium 013	—	—	—
October 22, 2023	Copenhagen	Denmark	Amager Bio	—	—	—
Total

== Cancelled shows ==
List of cancelled concerts, showing date, city, country, venue and reason for cancellation
Date	City	Country	Venue	Reason
October 26, 2023	Stockholm	Sweden	Fryshuset	Unknown
