= Champain & Vacay =

Song by Travis Scott and Don Toliver

from the album JackBoys 2
- Released: July 13, 2025
- Length: 3:04
- Label: Cactus Jack; Epic
- Songwriters: Jacques Webster II; Caleb Toliver; Juaquin Malphurs; Kobe Hood; Cole Morie; Keshav Balaji
- Producers: Bbykobe; Mcevoy; Kesh

"Champain & Vacay" is a song by American rappers and singers and Cactus Jack Records labelmates Travis Scott and Don Toliver. It was released through Cactus Jack and Epic Records as the second track from JackBoys (the artist name for Cactus Jack) and Scott's collaborative compilation album, JackBoys 2, on July 13, 2025. The two artists wrote the song with producers Bbykobe, Mcevoy, and Kesh. Travis Scott’s verse is a response to Pusha T’s diss in “So Be It”.

== Composition and lyrics ==
On "Champain & Vacay", Scott kicks off the chorus by singing about a girl who does not care too much for living a fancy lifestyle. The song received attention due to Scott responding to fellow American rapper Pusha T, who targeted him on "So Be It", his single with his older brother and fellow rapper No Malice as part of the hip-hop duo Clipse. In the verse, Scott raps: "Yeah, man, I swear these old niggas kill me / Know my YNs feel me / They just want the real me, yeah / Blue Bugatti, I'm dodgin' TMZ / Made a hundred off pushin' T's / Now my phone on DND, yeah". The lines received mixed reviews from hip-hop fans online, with some praising them and some saying that it was a weak response from Scott. Despite this, Toliver appears near the end of the verse and then sings the chorus, while fellow American rapper Waka Flocka Flame provides adlibs throughout. The song received generally positive reviews, with particular praise for its production and vocals from Toliver and Scott. In a ranking of all songs from the album, Billboard's Michael Saponara saw "Champain & Vacay" as the third best song, praising the latter's adlibs and summarizing that "the true project intro finds a peaceful wave".

== Charts ==
Chart performance for "Champain & Vacay"
| Chart (2025) | Peak position |
|---|---|
| Australia (ARIA) | 78 |
| Australia Hip Hop/R&B (ARIA) | 7 |
| Canada Hot 100 (Billboard) | 55 |
| Global 200 (Billboard) | 49 |
| Ireland (IRMA) | 94 |
| New Zealand Hot Singles (RMNZ) | 7 |
| Poland (Polish Streaming Top 100) | 86 |
| South Africa Streaming (TOSAC) | 39 |
| Switzerland (Schweizer Hitparade) | 53 |
| UK Singles (OCC) | 60 |
| UK Hip Hop/R&B (OCC) | 14 |
| US Billboard Hot 100 | 53 |
| US Hot R&B/Hip-Hop Songs (Billboard) | 13 |
