= Psycho Tour (Don Toliver) =

2024–2025 concert tour by Don Toliver

- Tour by Don Toliver
- Location: Europe; North America
- Associated album: Hardstone Psycho
- Start date: October 12, 2024
- End date: June 13, 2025
- Legs: 2
- No. of shows: 43
- Producer: Live Nation

Don Toliver concert chronology
- Love Sick Tour (2023); Psycho Tour (2024–2025); Octane World Tour (2026)

The Psycho Tour was the third concert tour and first arena tour by American rapper and singer Don Toliver, staged in support of his fourth studio album, Hardstone Psycho. Produced and promoted by Live Nation, the tour marked Toliver’s most expansive global outing to date, spanning North America and Europe across 43 shows.

Announced on February 24, 2024, via Toliver’s official Instagram account, the tour commenced on October 12, 2024, at Rogers Arena in Vancouver, Canada, and concluded on June 13, 2025, at Carroponte in the Milan metropolitan area. The tour consisted of two legs and represented Toliver’s transition from mid-size venues to full-scale arenas, underscoring his commercial growth following the release of Hardstone Psycho.

== Tour dates ==
List of 2024 concerts
Date (2024)	City	Country	Venue	Attendance	Revenue
October 12	Vancouver	Canada	Rogers Arena	—	—
October 13	Seattle	United States	WaMu Theater	—	—
October 15	San Francisco	United States	Bill Graham Civic Auditorium	—	—
October 18	Phoenix	United States	Footprint Center	—	—
October 19	Los Angeles	United States	Crypto.com Arena	—	—
October 20	San Diego	United States	Viejas Arena	—	—
October 23	Austin	United States	Moody Center	—	—
October 24	Rogers	United States	Walmart Arkansas Music Pavilion	—	—
October 26	Houston	United States	Toyota Center	—	—
October 27	Dallas	United States	American Airlines Center	—	—
October 29	Atlanta	United States	State Farm Arena	—	—
October 31	Charlotte	United States	Spectrum Center	—	—
November 2	Columbus	United States	Nationwide Arena	—	—
November 3	Pittsburgh	United States	PPG Paints Arena	—	—
November 6	Philadelphia	United States	Liacouras Center	—	—
November 8	Fairfax	United States	EagleBank Arena	—	—
November 10	Boston	United States	Agganis Arena	—	—
November 11	Brooklyn	United States	Barclays Center	—	—
November 13	Montreal	Canada	Centre Bell	—	—
November 14	Toronto	Canada	Scotiabank Arena	—	—
November 15	Detroit	United States	Little Caesars Arena	—	—
November 18	Chicago	United States	Credit Union 1 Arena	—	—
November 19	St. Louis	United States	Chaifetz Arena	—	—
November 21	Denver	United States	Ball Arena	—	—

List of 2025 concerts
Date (2025)	City	Country	Venue	Attendance	Revenue
May 13	Oslo	Norway	Oslo Spektrum	—	—
May 15	Copenhagen	Denmark	K.B. Hallen	—	—
May 17	Frankfurt	Germany	Festhalle	—	—
May 18	Prague	Czechia	O2 Universum	—	—
May 19	Dübendorf	Switzerland	The Hall	—	—
May 20	Dübendorf	Switzerland	The Hall	—	—
May 22	Berlin	Germany	Velodrom	—	—
May 23	Düsseldorf	Germany	Mitsubishi Electric Halle	—	—
May 24	Paris	France	Adidas Arena	—	—
May 26	Amsterdam	Netherlands	AFAS Live	—	—
May 27	Brussels	Belgium	Forest National	—	—
May 30	Dublin	Ireland	3Arena	—	—
June 1	Manchester	England	Co-op Live	—	—
June 2	Glasgow	Scotland	OVO Hydro	—	—
June 4	London	England	The O_{2} Arena	—	—
June 6	Amsterdam	Netherlands	AFAS Dome	—	—
June 7	Hamburg	Germany	Barclays Arena	—	—
June 10	Warsaw	Poland	Arena COS Torwar	—	—
June 13	Milan	Italy	Carroponte	—	—
Total
