= Nitrous (album) =

Studio album by Don Toliver
- Released: December 4, 2026
- Recorded: 2026
- Labels: Donnway & Co; Cactus Jack; Atlantic
- Producer: Don Toliver

Don Toliver chronology
Octane (2026)	Nitrous (2026)

Singles from Nitrous
- 1. "Party with the Boys" Released: November 13, 2026

Nitrous is the upcoming sixth studio album by American rapper and singer Don Toliver. It is scheduled for release on December 4, 2026, through Donnway & Co, Cactus Jack Records, and Atlantic Records. The album follows Toliver's fifth studio album, Octane (2026), and marks his second studio album released within a year.

== Background and recording ==
Following the release of Octane in January 2026, Toliver revealed in a June 2026 interview with Boardroom that he had already recorded "more music", less than five months after the album's release. Explaining his creative process, he said that he felt obligated to continue making music as he lived his "real life" in order to "capture the moment". He also expressed that he was "ready to go crazy" again, adding that he would "damn near call [the next album] Nitrous".

On July 18, 2026, Toliver and musician J Young MDK revealed via an Instagram video that the album was titled Nitrous and was "on the way". During the video, J Young MDK also stated that he had heard the completed album. The album is set to serve as a sequel to Octane, continuing its fuel- and engine-inspired branding. The album title also serves as the name of the second leg of the 2026 Octane World Tour by Toliver, which runs from August 4 to November 24, 2026, and comprises 37 dates.

== Promotion ==
On August 2, 2026, Toliver initiated the album rollout ahead of the start of his tour two days later. He changed his Instagram username from @octanemountain to @activate_nitrous and announced the beginning of a new era with the phrase "no better time than now". During a tour stop in early September 2026, Toliver confirmed that the album was still scheduled for release later that year but did not provide a specific date.

"Party with the Boys" was released as the lead single from the album on November 13, 2026. On November 17, following the announcement of the 69th Annual Grammy Awards nominations the previous day, he announced the album's release date and a scheduled performance on Saturday Night Live for the day after the album's release. Alongside the announcement, Toliver released a promotional trailer set in an all-white environment in Stuttgart, Germany. In the trailer, he transforms the space into a recording studio and portrays a "mad scientist" behind the concept. The visual aesthetic continues the style established for Octane earlier that year. The teaser caption credits Toliver as the sole recording engineer and producer of the album.
