= Home (Metro Boomin, Don Toliver and Lil Uzi Vert song) =

2023 song by Metro Boomin, Don Toliver And Lil Uzi Vert

Song by Metro Boomin, Don Toliver and Lil Uzi Vert

from the album Metro Boomin Presents Spider-Man: Across the Spider-Verse (Soundtrack from & Inspired by the Motion Picture)
- Released: June 2, 2023
- Recorded: 2021
- Genre: R&B; trap
- Length: 3:15
- Label: Boominati; Republic
- Songwriters: Leland Wayne; Caleb Toliver; Symere Woods; Christopher Townsend; Stephen Feigenbaum
- Producers: Metro Boomin; Chris Townsend; Johan Lenox

"Home" is a song by American record producer Metro Boomin & American rappers Don Toliver and Lil Uzi Vert. It was released through Boominati Worldwide and Republic Records as the tenth track from Metro's first soundtrack album, which was for the film Spider-Man: Across the Spider-Verse.

== Background ==
It was first previewed via Metro Boomin's social media accounts on May 25, 2023.

== Composition and lyrics ==
"Home" is an emo synth-filled where Don Toliver and Lil Uzi Vert touch upon ideas of homesickness and self-battles. while Lil Uzi Vert sings from the perspective of both themselves and Miles Morales from the film Spider-Man: Across the Spider-Verse: "Shoot my web, swing from these buildings and I'm finally free, And I can't help that everyone looks like I'm some kind of freak My shadow's the only one that follows me". and also reference to themselves "I’ve been fightin' ground, hidin' my identity" in 2022 Uzi came out as non-binary. which was later confirmed by their spokesperson in a statement to Pitchfork. In 2023 Woods confirmed that they identify as gender-nonconforming.

== Reception ==
Dylan Green of Pitchfork wrote that the artists' "best work" happens when they "broaden their horizons with some experiments", as when they "warp guitar strings" on the song, while Peter A. Barry of HipHopDX referred to Toliver's chorus as "symbolic and melodically rich enough to be engaging".

== Charts ==
Chart performance for "Home"
Chart (2023)	Peak position
Canada Hot 100 (Billboard)	79
Global 200 (Billboard)	195
US Hot R&B/Hip-Hop Songs (Billboard)	39
