= Rosary (song) =

2026 song by Don Toliver featuring Travis Scott

Song by Don Toliver featuring Travis Scott

from the album Octane
- Released: January 30, 2026
- Length: 3:14
- Label: Cactus Jack; Donnway & Co; Atlantic
- Songwriters: Caleb Toliver; Jacques Webster II; Wesley Glass; Sean Momberger
- Producers: Wheezy; Momberger

"Rosary" is a song by American rapper Don Toliver featuring American rapper Travis Scott, from the former's fifth studio album, Octane (2026). It was produced by Wheezy and Sean Momberger.

== Composition ==
The production of the song include strings. The lyrics revolve around a woman, whom Don Toliver mentions looks at him "like Superman".

== Critical reception ==
The song received generally positive reviews. Michael Saponara of Billboard ranked it as the fifth best song from Octane, writing "'Rosary' melts on the tongue rather than the typical fireworks from the Cactus Jack brothers, but their latest addition to the collaboration history is another win for Houston and ranks near the top of OCTANE." Alexander Cole of HotNewHipHop called it "a sugary sweet collaboration that has both artists delivering stripped back versions of themselves", adding that "One could even describe this song as a ballad of sorts. The instrumental is quite gorgeous, and Toliver's performance is great. Not to mention, Scott is just as melodic and sounds focused." Kayla Torres of Exclaim! commented "as expected, he and Travis Scott never miss — 'Rosary' is sure to be on everyone's late-night driving playlists." Matthew Ritchie of Pitchfork responded negatively to Scott's feature, regarding it as "basically a less interesting copy-and-paste of his feature on 'Love Galore.'"

== Charts ==
Chart performance for "Rosary"
Chart (2026)	Peak position
Canada Hot 100 (Billboard)	45
Global 200 (Billboard)	65
Greece International (IFPI)	60
New Zealand Hot Singles (RMNZ)	6
Portugal (AFP)	77
US Billboard Hot 100	36
US Hot R&B/Hip-Hop Songs (Billboard)	13
