= BB Publications =

British publisher

- Headquarters location: London, Dubai
- Distribution: Worldwide
- Publication types: Philanthropy, Books, Art, Culture
- Imprints: B Beyond
- Official website: linveco.com, bbpublications.org, bbeyondmagazine.com

BB Publications is a publisher of books and periodicals that profile philanthropists and thinkers. The company also reports on philanthropic work via social media. It is owned by the Linveco Media Group. and is headquartered in London, with offices in Dubai, Hong Kong, and Dallas.

== Imprints ==
BB Publications has a number of publishing imprints:

=== B Beyond Magazine ===
B Beyond profiles philanthropists, art collectors and entrepreneurs in a series of interviews, accompanied by photography. Content is supplied in the form of interviews with industrialists, financiers, philanthropist, and intellectuals. Interviewees have included David Rockefeller, T. Boone Pickens, Nicolas Berggruen, David Richards, John Caudwell and Jon Moulton. The magazine also runs a "BB Inner Circle", which regularly sponsors philanthropic, fundraising, charity and art foundations events.

=== Fault ===
Fault magazine collaborates with artists in the fashion, film and music industry. It operates its own non-profit magazine as a platform for identifying young creative people of merit (writers, musicians and artists in different disciplines, i.e. visual arts and film, architecture, design). Fault Magazine also invests in new and emerging talent in the areas of art and design, literature, music, film and photography.

=== Beyond Black Book Series ===
Beyond Black is a coffee table book series. Publications are distributed to high-net-worth individuals who are engaged in and actively support philanthropic projects. Previous publications include "Wealth: Most Exclusive Private Banks and Financial Institutions", "Jets: Conversations with the World's Top Players in Aviation", "Grand Prix Circuits: Conversations with the World's Top Figures in Motorsport", "Superyacths and Privileged Lifestyles" and "Plastic Surgery: The World's Top Surgeons and Clinics".
