= FWU =

2025 single by Don Toliver

Single by Don Toliver and Mustard
- Released: June 27, 2025
- Length: 2:51
- Label: Cactus Jack; Atlantic; Donnway & Co
- Songwriters: Caleb Toliver; Dijon McFarlane; Shah Rukh Zaman Khan
- Producer: Mustard

Don Toliver singles chronology
"Lose My Mind" (2025)	"FWU" (2025)	"2000 Excursion" (2025)

Mustard singles chronology
"Pray for Me" (2024)	"FWU" (2025)

Music video
- "FWU" on YouTube

"FWU" is a song by American rapper and singer Don Toliver and American record producer Mustard. It was released as a single through Cactus Jack, Atlantic Records, and Donnway & Co on June 27, 2025. The song was produced by Mustard and co-produced by Gylttryp, both of whom wrote it with Toliver.

== Background and composition ==
Toliver released a teaser of "FWU" through a video on June 12, 2025, his 31st birthday. The official music video was released on the same day as the single and sees him coasting through Miami, Florida, showing off his jewelry and collection of cars as he raps: "My diamonds pavé, they be doin' sign language / I'm down with your friends and the hoes that you came with (Yeah) / Okay, I'm outside, wrap my baby in a blanket / Okay, I'm outside, you can meet me at the banquet". A bass-heavy song, he raps about living the fast-paced life of a celebrity, his love life, and partying with his melodic vocals.

== Charts ==
Chart performance for "FWU"
Chart (2025)	Peak position
Canada Hot 100 (Billboard)	82
Global 200 (Billboard)	176
New Zealand Hot Singles (RMNZ)	13
US Billboard Hot 100	82
US Hot R&B/Hip-Hop Songs (Billboard)	19
