= 3am (Loe Shimmy and Don Toliver song) =

2025 single by Loe Shimmy and Don Toliver

Single by Loe Shimmy and Don Toliver

from the album Rockstar Junkie
- Released: July 19, 2025
- Recorded: 2025
- Length: 2:16
- Label: Rebel; Gamma
- Songwriters: Shamar Cox; Caleb Toliver
- Producers: King Nathan; Jacasikk

Loe Shimmy singles chronology
"Tubi Movie" (2025)	"3am" (2025)	"Crank Up Da Jet" (2025)

Don Toliver singles chronology
"Tiramisu" (2025)	"3am" (2025)	"Satellite" (2025)

Music video
- "3am" on YouTube

"3am" is a song by American rappers Loe Shimmy and Don Toliver. It was released on July 19, 2025 as the fourth single from the former's eighth studio album, Rockstar Junkie, which was released a day earlier. It is his highest-charting song, peaking at number 71 on the Billboard Hot 100.

== Background ==
Loe Shimmy and Don Toliver met up in Los Angeles during the 2025 Rolling Loud weekend and recorded four songs together, including "3am". The song was finished in a matter of hours. Shimmy stated that they predicted it would be a hit and they had "amazing chemistry".

== Critical reception ==
In a review of Rockstar Junkie for HotNewHipHop, Bryson "Boom" Paul cited "3am" as among the songs that "highlight his ability to switch between grit and introspection. His delivery balances vulnerability and swagger, adding new texture to the Southern 'pain rap' tradition."

== Charts ==
Chart performance for "3am"
Chart (2025–2026)	Peak position
New Zealand Hot Singles (RMNZ)	39
US Billboard Hot 100	71
US Hot R&B/Hip-Hop Songs (Billboard)	14
US Rhythmic Airplay (Billboard)	21
