= Octane (Don Toliver album) =

Studio album by Don Toliver
- Released: January 30, 2026
- Recorded: December 2024 – January 2026
- Studios: Mount Wilson Observatory, Mount Wilson, California
- Genres: Alternative hip-hop; trap
- Length: 49:52
- Labels: Donnway & Co; Cactus Jack; Atlantic
- Producers: Don Toliver; 206Derek; 30 Roc; Aaron Paris; Autrioly; Roark Bailey; Bangs; Bbykobe; Ben10k; Bnyx; Cardo; Da Honorable C.N.O.T.E.; Mike Dean; Fendii; FnZ; Frankieontheguitar; Ghost; Jaasu; J Hux; Sean Momberger; Money Jesus; Oh Ross; Tommy Parker; Polo Boy Shawty; Prince85; Rio Leyva; Gabe Shaddow; Sharkboy; SkipOnDaBeat; Synthetic; Jahaan Sweet; Travis Scott; Vendr; Wheezy; Dylan Wiggins

Don Toliver chronology
Hardstone Psycho (2024)	Octane (2026)	Nitrous (2026)

Singles from Octane
- 1. "Tiramisu" Released: September 5, 2025; 2. "ATM" Released: January 23, 2026; 3. "Body" Released: February 17, 2026; 4. "E85" Released: March 17, 2026; 5. "Tuition" Released: April 3, 2026

Octane is the fifth studio album by American rapper and singer Don Toliver. It was released through Donnway & Co and Cactus Jack under license to Atlantic Records on January 30, 2026. The album features guest appearances from Yeat, Rema, Travis Scott, Teezo Touchdown, and SahBabii. Production was handled by Toliver and Scott themselves, alongside past collaborators including 206Derek, Bnyx, Da Honorable C.N.O.T.E., FnZ, Jahaan Sweet, and Dylan Wiggins, among others. Octane serves as the follow-up to Toliver's previous album, Hardstone Psycho (2024).

Octane received generally favorable reviews from music critics. The album debuted atop on the US Billboard 200, becoming Toliver's first number-one album. It spawned six top-40 songs on the Billboard Hot 100, the highest amount out of all of his albums. The album was supported by five singles: "Tiramisu", "ATM", "Body", "E85", and "Tuition", released as a remix with rapper Lil Baby. A remix EP with DJ Candlestick titled Choptane was released on April 3.

== Release and promotion ==
On March 14, 2025, during Toliver's performance at the Time Nightclub in Costa Mesa, California, he teased that he would be releasing a new album later in the year: "I don't wanna stop, I might drop this year, fuck it," he said to an excited crowd. "Might say, 'Fuck it' and drop a whole 'nother album on these niggas. I might say fuck it and drop a whole 'nother beautiful project on these niggas". He then confirmed that he will be releasing a new album later in the year in an interview with Fault Magazine on July 25, which was postponed to the next year for unknown reasons. The title of the album was revealed through merchandise that was given to fans at his pop-up event at ComplexCon on October 25, where he debuted his new sneaker line in collaboration with Reebok and Billionaire Boys Club called the Ice Cream Board Flips. On January 22, 2026, Toliver revealed the album's release date and shared its cover art. Toliver performed "E85" and "Long Way to Calabasas" from the album on The Tonight Show Starring Jimmy Fallon on January 26.

=== Singles ===
Toliver released the lead single of the album, "Tiramisu", on September 5. "ATM" was surprise-released as the second single on January 23, 2026. "Body" was sent to US rhythmic radio as the album's third single on February 17, followed by "E85" receiving the same radio treatment and becoming its fourth single exactly a month later. "Tuition" was released as the album's fifth and final single on April 3, following a remix of the song in collaboration with fellow American rapper Lil Baby.

== Critical reception ==
Professional ratings
Aggregate scores
Source	Rating
Metacritic	72/100
Review scores
Source	Rating
AllMusic	3.5/5 stars
Clash	8/10
Exclaim!	7/10
Pitchfork	6.5/10

According to the review aggregator Metacritic, Octane received "generally favorable reviews" based on a weighted average score of 72 out of 100 from 4 critic scores. Reviewing Octane for Clash magazine, Robin Murray felt that the album "represents his [Toliver's] most cohesive and consistent work yet, tapping into his core creative characteristics while boosting him further into the stratosphere". In his review for Pitchfork, Matthew Ritchie concluded that Toliver "manages to buoy even the most underwhelming stretches of his fifth album with sparks of personality and timely features".

== Commercial performance ==
Octane debuted at number one on the US Billboard 200 chart, earning 162,000 album-equivalent units (including 31,000 copies in pure album sales) in its first week, giving Toliver his first number-one album. The album also accumulated a total of 138.98 million on-demand streams of the album's songs.

== Track listing ==
Octane track listing
No.	Title	Writer(s)	Producer(s)	Length
1.	"E85"	Caleb Toliver; Jacques Webster II; Aaron Cheung; Derek Anderson; Jaasu Mallory; Malcolm Hobert; Charles Ziman; Jonah Cochran	Travis Scott; Aaron Paris; 206Derek; Jaasu	2:33
2.	"Body"	Toliver; Justin Timberlake; Pharrell Williams; Charles Hugo; J. Webster; Mallory	Travis Scott; Jaasu; Bnyx; Jahaan Sweet	2:35
3.	"Rendezvous" (featuring Yeat)	Toliver; Noah Smith; Anderson; Rio Leyva; Kobe Hood; Bennett Pepple	Don Toliver; 206Derek; Leyva; Bbykobe; Bangs	2:26
4.	"Secondhand" (featuring Rema)	Toliver; Divine Ikubor; Anderson; Roark Bailey; Gabe Shaddow	206Derek; Bailey; Shaddow	3:46
5.	"Tiramisu"	Toliver; Ronald LaTour Jr.; Damon Hendricks Jr.; Hood	Cardo; Polo Boy Shawty	2:19
6.	"ATM"	Toliver; Carlton Mays Jr.; Anderson; Cole Wainwright	Don Toliver; Da Honorable C.N.O.T.E.; 206Derek; Oh Ross; Prince85	3:00
7.	"Long Way to Calabasas"	Toliver; Tharusha Mudiyanselage; Theodore Ravhanza; Javier Mercado; Joel Huckle; Joey Fenderson; Francisco Gualter; Edgard Herrera	Autrioly; Synthetic; J Hux; Fendii; Frankieontheguitar	1:39
8.	"Rosary" (featuring Travis Scott)	Toliver; J. Webster; Wesley Glass; Sean Momberger	Wheezy; Momberger	3:14
9.	"All the Signs" (featuring Teezo Touchdown)	Toliver; Harvey Jay Mason; Damon Thomas; Durrell Babbs; Antonio Dixon; Steven L. Russell; Anderson; Mallory; Thomas Lumpkins; Dylan Wiggins; Edgar Ferrera	206Derek; Jaasu; Tommy Parker; Wiggins; Chaileah; SkipOnDaBeat^{[a]}	3:20
10.	"Call Back"	Toliver; Sweet; Anderson; Bailey	Don Toliver; Sweet; 206Derek; Bailey	2:03
11.	"Tuition"	Toliver; Anderson; Leyva	206Derek; Leyva; Bnyx; Ghost	2:49
12.	"K9" (featuring SahBabii)	Toliver; Saaheem Valdery; Garrison Webster; Anderson; Leyva	Vendr; 206Derek; Leyva	2:34
13.	"Excavator"	Toliver; Benjamin Saint Fort; Sweet; Anderson; Desmond Rasberry; Jess Jackson	Bnyx; Sweet; 206Derek; Money Jesus; Jackson^{[a]}	3:31
14.	"Gemstone"	Toliver; Michael Mulé; Isaac De Boni; Samuel Gloade; Anderson; Mallory; Jackson	FnZ; 30 Roc; 206Derek; Jaasu; Jackson^{[a]}	2:01
15.	"Opposite"	Toliver; Anderson; Leyva; Ferrera	206Derek; Leyva; SkipOnDaBeat	2:37
16.	"TMU"	Toliver; Mule; De Boni; Anderson; Leyva; Mercado; Etham Basden; Siviwe Mngaza; Kaleem Taylor-Decouteau; Alexandra Veltri	FnZ; 206Derek; Leyva; Synthetic; Sharkboy	3:00
17.	"Pleasure's Mine"	Toliver; Anderson; Mallory; Benjamin Wilson; Jackson; Thea Gustafsson	206Derek; Jaasu; Ben10k; Jackson^{[a]}; Gustafsson^{[a]}	2:57
18.	"Sweet Home"	Toliver; Robert Ritchie; Matthew Shafer; Ronnie Van Zant; Gary Rossington; Edward King; Robert Wachtel; Warren Zevon; Leroy Marinell; Anderson; Sweet; Wiggins; Michael Dean	206Derek; Sweet; Wiggins; Mike Dean	3:20
Total length:				49:00

Digital deluxe version 1 bonus track
No.	Title	Writer(s)	Producer(s)	Length
19.	"Ease Your Mind"	Toliver	Project X; Daniel Moras; Williskeating	1:40

Digital deluxe version 2 bonus track
No.	Title	Writer(s)	Length
19.	"Rocket Power"	Toliver; Charlotte Aitchison; Alexander Guy Cook	4:04

Digital deluxe version 3 bonus track
No.	Title	Writer(s)	Length
19.	"Falling Asleep"	Toliver	3:19

=== Notes ===
- ^{^[a]} denotes an additional producer.
- "E85" contains a sample of "Chest Pain (I Love)", written by Malcolm Todd, Jonah Cochran and Charles Ziman, and performed by Malcolm Todd.
- "Body" contains a sample of "Rock Your Body", written by Justin Timberlake, Pharrell Williams, and Charles Hugo, and performed by Timberlake.
- "Sweet Home" contains an interpolation of "All Summer Long", written by Robert Richie, Matthew Shafer, Ronnie Van Zant, Gary Rossington, Edward King, Robert Wachtel, Warren Zevon, and Leroy Marinell, and performed by Kid Rock. (Note: "All Summer Long" itself contains samples of "Sweet Home Alabama" by Lynyrd Skynyrd and "Werewolves of London" by Warren Zevon.)
- "Rocket Power" contains a sample of "Party 4 U", written by Charlotte Aitchison and Alexander Guy Cook, and performed by Charli XCX.
- "All The Signs" contains an interpolation of "Naked", written by Durrell Babbs, Antonio Dixon , Steven L. Russell, Harvey Mason Jr. and Damon Thomas , and performed by Marques Houston.

== Personnel ==
Credits are adapted from Tidal.

- Don Toliver – vocals (all tracks), synthesizer (track 10)
- Jess Jackson – mixing, mastering (all tracks); arrangement (14, 17)
- 206Derek – mixing (all tracks), engineering (3–9, 13–17); drum programming, keyboards (4, 10)
- Dillon Brophy – mixing assistance
- Rob Schaer – orchestration (1, 4, 8, 13, 16–18)
- David Hughes – bass (1, 13)
- Jake Reed – drums (1, 13)
- Will Brahm – guitar (1, 13)
- Aretha Scruggs – choir vocals (1, 16)
- Dedrick Bonner – choir vocals (1, 16)
- Eran Scoggins – choir vocals (1, 16)
- Joslynn James – choir vocals (1, 16)
- Krystle Simmons – choir vocals (1, 16)
- Lydia René – choir vocals (1, 16)
- Olivia Maye – choir vocals (1, 16)
- Suzanne Waters – choir vocals (1, 16)
- Tio Simone – choir vocals (1, 16)
- Tym Brown – choir vocals (1, 16)
- Aaron Paris – synthesizer, violin (1)
- Edgard Herrera – engineering (2, 6, 7, 10–12, 14, 16)
- Yeat – vocals (3)
- Roark Bailey – drum programming, keyboards (4, 10)
- Cameron Stone – cello (4, 17, 18)
- Drew Forde – viola (4, 17, 18)
- Katie Sloan – violin (4, 17, 18)
- Luanne Homzy – violin (4, 17, 18)
- Gabe Lucas – background vocals, keyboards (4)
- Rema – vocals (4)
- Essosa – additional vocals (7)
- Xavier Daniel – engineering (7)
- Tristan Cappell – tenor saxophone (8)
- Ido Meshulam – trombone (8)
- Aaron Janik – trumpet (8)
- Travis Scott – vocals (8)
- Mike Dean – co-mixing (8)
- Teezo Touchdown – vocals (9)
- Jahaan Sweet – additional synthesizer (10)
- SahBabii – vocals (12)
- Alexandra Veltri – background vocals (16)
- Sassy 009 – background vocals (17)

== Charts ==
Chart performance for Octane
Chart (2026)	Peak position
Australian Albums (ARIA)	4
Australian Hip Hop/R&B Albums (ARIA)	1
Austrian Albums (Ö3 Austria)	3
Belgian Albums (Ultratop Flanders)	18
Belgian Albums (Ultratop Wallonia)	13
Canadian Albums (Billboard)	1
Czech Albums (ČNS IFPI)	92
Danish Albums (Hitlisten)	5
Dutch Albums (Album Top 100)	4
Finnish Albums (Suomen virallinen lista)	31
French Albums (SNEP)	35
German Albums (Offizielle Top 100)	10
German Hip-Hop Albums (Offizielle Top 100)	1
Hungarian Albums (MAHASZ)	2
Irish Albums (Official Charts)	7
Italian Albums (FIMI)	15
Lithuanian Albums (AGATA)	5
New Zealand Albums (RMNZ)	3
Nigerian Albums (TurnTable)	11
Norwegian Albums (IFPI Norge)	4
Polish Albums (ZPAV)	3
Portuguese Albums (AFP)	1
Scottish Albums (Official Charts)	46
Spanish Albums (Promusicae)	38
Swedish Albums (Sverigetopplistan)	36
Swiss Albums (Schweizer Hitparade)	1
UK Albums (Official Charts)	4
UK R&B Albums (Official Charts)	2
US Billboard 200	1
US Top R&B/Hip-Hop Albums (Billboard)	1

== Certifications ==
Certifications for Octane
Region	Certification	Certified units/sales
Canada (Music Canada)	Platinum	80,000^{‡}
New Zealand (RMNZ)	Gold	7,500^{‡}
Portugal (AFP)	Gold	3,500^{‡}
United Kingdom (BPI)	Silver	60,000^{‡}
^{‡} Sales+streaming figures based on certification alone.
