= What to Do? =

2019 song by JackBoys and Travis Scott featuring Don Toliver

Song by JackBoys and Travis Scott featuring Don Toliver

from the album JackBoys
- Released: December 27, 2019
- Recorded: 2019
- Genre: Hip hop; trap
- Length: 4:10
- Label: Epic; Cactus Jack
- Songwriters: Jacques Webster; Caleb Toliver; Khadimou Fall; Mike Dean; James Cyr; Julius-Alexander Brown; Niv Kalisky; Sarah Schachner
- Producers: Dean; London Cyr; Jenius; Earlyyellow (misc.); Schachner (misc.)

"What to Do?" (stylized in all caps) is a song by American record label Cactus Jack Records under the name JackBoys, and their label leader American rapper Travis Scott featuring fellow American rapper and labelmate Don Toliver. It was released from the lead artists' compilation album JackBoys (2019). The song was written by rappers alongside Sheck Wes, who has additional vocals on the track, and producers Mike Dean, London Cyr, Jenius, Early Yellow, and Sarah Schachner.

== Composition ==
The song revolves around Travis Scott and Don Toliver each having a blackout from drunkenness, still being intoxicated, and trying to recollect the events of the night before. Production in the song includes synth, a guitar solo, and violin in the outro.

== Critical reception ==
The song received generally positive reviews; critics have regarded Don Toliver's performance in particular as standing out. Noah C. of HotNewHipHop commented, "It's the kind of grandiose ode to banal events that Travis thrives at making and Don Toliver proves to be a perfect companion for that endeavour. There's an ominous synth breakdown and washed-out guitar solo that takes a page out of the Mike Dean playbook (unless he's responsible for it) to render 'WHAT TO DO?' a drug rap masterpiece." Sputnikmusic called it a "redeeming psychedelia tinged 'wavy' track that definitely picks the momentum back up" and described it as "fantastic, a taut and trademark Travis Scott track, complete with reverb, echo, and a surprisingly good guitar solo". Sheldon Pearce of Pitchfork praised Toliver's style of using Auto-Tune ("he works in a higher octave range than Scott and is simply a more lifelike upgrade of his prototype"), commenting that this is best expressed in the song and adding, "It's Toliver who sounds like he's rallying, his voice less like a piece of software and more an instrument of feeling. His singsong verse is one of the few moments on JACKBOYS that isn't just product." Ryan Feyre of RapReviews wrote, "It's basically become a meme to say Scott's music is all about the vibe, but when his brand of auto-crooning works, things turn magical. 'What to Do?' finds Jack at his most heavenly. By the time the violin outro reaches its apex of insanity, everyone's already high off atmosphere."

Kevin Cortez of HipHopDX gave a negative review of the song, writing, "Don Toliver, as talented as his crooning may be, flails alone on the bloated 'WHAT TO DO?' through flat Auto-Tune melodies and generic 'I'm still not sober' late-night songwriting."

== Charts ==
Chart (2019–20)	Peak position
Australia (ARIA)	86
Austria (Ö3 Austria Top 40)	68
Canada Hot 100 (Billboard)	38
France (SNEP)	102
Switzerland (Schweizer Hitparade)	32
UK Singles (Official Charts)	57
US Billboard Hot 100	56
US Hot R&B/Hip-Hop Songs (Billboard)	26

== Certifications ==
Region	Certification	Certified units/sales
Canada (Music Canada)	Gold	40,000^{‡}
United States (RIAA)	Platinum	1,000,000^{‡}
^{‡} Sales+streaming figures based on certification alone.
