= Secondhand (song) =

2026 song by Don Toliver featuring Rema

Song by Don Toliver featuring Rema

from the album Octane
- Released: January 30, 2026
- Genre: Afrobeats
- Length: 3:46
- Label: Cactus Jack; Donnway & Co; Atlantic
- Songwriters: Caleb Toliver; Divine Ikubor; Derek Anderson; Roark Bailey; Gabe Shaddow
- Producers: 206Derek; Bailey; Shaddow

"Secondhand" is a song by American rapper Don Toliver featuring Nigerian musician Rema, from the former's fifth studio album, Octane (2026). It was produced by 206Derek, Roark Bailey and Gabe Shaddow.

== Composition ==
The song contains elements of Afrobeats. In an introspective, desperate tone, Don Toliver attempts to convince his lover that they are meant for each other and is willing to do anything to maintain their relationship.

== Critical reception ==
Michael Saponara of Billboard placed "Secondhand" at number 12 in his ranking of the songs from Octane, praising Don Toliver's versatility.

== Charts ==
Chart performance for "Secondhand"
Chart (2026)	Peak position
Austria (Ö3 Austria Top 40)	68
Canada Hot 100 (Billboard)	32
Germany (GfK)	80
Global 200 (Billboard)	39
Greece International (IFPI)	18
Ireland (IRMA)	65
Netherlands (Single Top 100)	10
New Zealand Hot Singles (RMNZ)	5
Nigeria (TurnTable Top 100)	54
Portugal (AFP)	40
South Africa Streaming (TOSAC)	65
Switzerland (Schweizer Hitparade)	33
UK Singles (Official Charts)	51
UK Hip Hop/R&B (Official Charts)	21
US Billboard Hot 100	29
US Hot R&B/Hip-Hop Songs (Billboard)	9

== Certifications ==
Certifications for "Secondhand"
Region	Certification	Certified units/sales
Australia (ARIA)	Gold	35,000^{‡}
Canada (Music Canada)	Platinum	80,000^{‡}
Portugal (AFP)	Gold	12,000^{‡}
^{‡} Sales+streaming figures based on certification alone.
