= New Drop =

2024 song by Don Toliver

Song by Don Toliver

from the album Hardstone Psycho
- Released: June 14, 2024
- Genre: Hip house; alternative R&B
- Length: 3:37
- Label: Cactus Jack; Atlantic
- Songwriters: Caleb Toliver; Wesley Glass; Simon Christensen; Ruby Mitchell; Dylan Cleary-Krell; Scotty Coleman
- Producers: Wheezy; Psymun; Dez Wright; Coleman

Music video
- "New Drop" on YouTube

"New Drop" is a song by American rapper and singer Don Toliver. It was released through Cactus Jack and Atlantic Records as a track from his fourth studio album, Hardstone Psycho, on June 14, 2024. Toliver wrote the song with producers Wheezy, Psymun, Dez Wright, and Coleman. The song gained mainstream popularity a few months after its release due to it being played in the background of a lot of videos on the online video platform TikTok.

== Charts ==
=== Weekly charts ===
Weekly chart performance for "New Drop"
Chart (2024)	Peak position
Australia (ARIA)	98
Australia Hip Hop/R&B (ARIA)	14
Canada Hot 100 (Billboard)	49
Global 200 (Billboard)	131
Greece International (IFPI)	54
Ireland (IRMA)	64
Lithuania (AGATA)	31
New Zealand Hot Singles (RMNZ)	30
Poland (Polish Streaming Top 100)	99
Switzerland (Schweizer Hitparade)	87
UK Singles (Official Charts)	64
UK Hip Hop/R&B (Official Charts)	26
US Billboard Hot 100	81
US Hot R&B/Hip-Hop Songs (Billboard)	22

=== Year-end charts ===
Year-end chart performance for "New Drop"
Chart (2025)	Position
US Hot R&B/Hip-Hop Songs (Billboard)	65

== Certifications ==
Certifications for "New Drop"
Region	Certification	Certified units/sales
Australia (ARIA)	Platinum	70,000^{‡}
Canada (Music Canada)	Platinum	80,000^{‡}
France (SNEP)	Gold	100,000^{‡}
Poland (ZPAV)	Gold	62,500^{‡}
New Zealand (RMNZ)	Platinum	30,000^{‡}
United Kingdom (BPI)	Silver	200,000^{‡}
^{‡} Sales+streaming figures based on certification alone.
