= Chase B =

American DJ (born 1990)

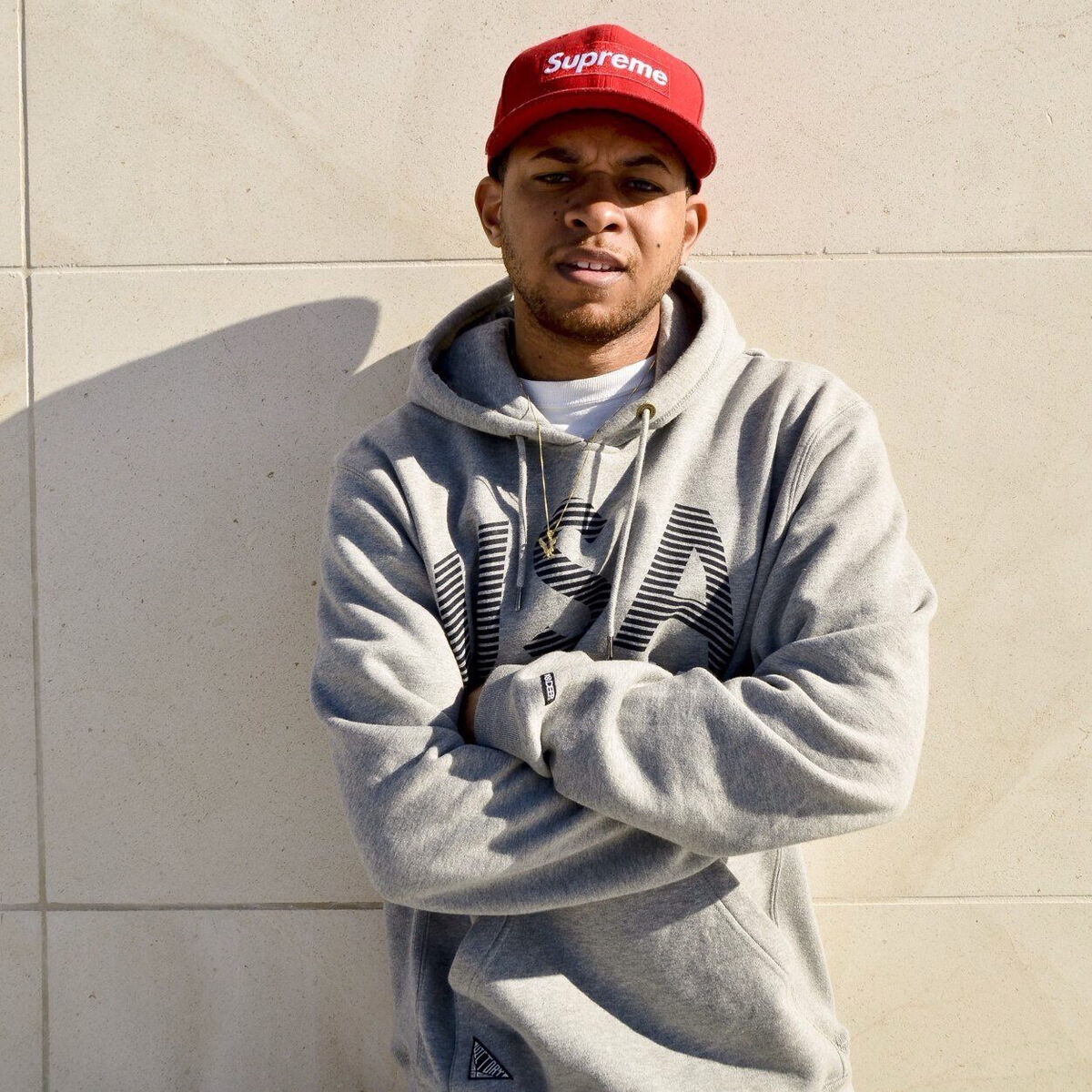

Background information
- Born: Chase Benjamin; May 11, 1990 (age 35); Houston, Texas, U.S.
- Genres: Hip-hop; trap
- Occupations: Disc jockey; record producer; songwriter
- Years active: 2013–present
- Labels: Cactus Jack; APG (current); Columbia (former)

Chase Benjamin (born May 11, 1990), known professionally as Chase B (stylized in all caps), is an American DJ and record producer. He is currently signed to fellow Houston native Travis Scott's record label, Cactus Jack Records and Artist Partner Group, and serves as a live DJ for him. He has also produced multiple songs for Scott and fellow Houston native and Cactus Jack signee Don Toliver. He has also collaborated with other notable artists, such as fellow rapper Sheck Wes, and rappers Young Thug, Gunna, Quavo, and Ty Dolla Sign, among others. Chase B has produced all his singles, and in addition to that, he has also produced "Franchise" by Scott featuring Young Thug and M.I.A. and "Xscape" by Toliver. He also runs a radio show with Scott called .WAV Radio, where the two play some of their favorite songs as well as unreleased music by both Cactus Jack artists and other artists.

== Career ==
Chase B first started DJing when he attended Howard University in Washington, D.C., and took it seriously after he moved to New York. He is a live DJ for Cactus Jack Records signees, specifically Travis Scott, Don Toliver, and Sheck Wes. Chase B has also acted as a producer on a few songs by them.

== Discography ==
=== Studio albums ===
List of studio albums, with selected details
Title	Album details
Be Very Afraid (Vol. 1)	Released: February 27, 2026; Label: Cactus Jack Records; Format: Digital download, streaming

=== Singles ===
List of singles; all singles are non-album singles
Title	Year	Peak chart positions
Title	Year	NZ Hot
"Mayday" (featuring Sheck Wes and Young Thug)	2019	—
"Casino" (with Ashton Travis)	2020	—
"Cafeteria" (with Don Toliver featuring Gunna)	2020	—
"For Me" (with OMB Bloodbath and KenTheMan)	2020	—
"365" (featuring Babyface Ray, Zona Man, and GT)	2021	—
"Lights Please" (with Khi Infinite and Pusha T)	2023	—
"Ring Ring" (featuring Travis Scott, Don Toliver, Quavo, and Ty Dolla Sign)	2023	11
"Street Sweeper" (with Swae Lee)	2023	—
"Satellite" (with Don Toliver and SoFaygo)	2025	—
