= Tore Up (song) =

2024 song by Don Toliver

Song by Don Toliver

from the album Hardstone Psycho
- Released: June 14, 2024
- Length: 2:07
- Label: Cactus Jack; Atlantic
- Songwriters: Caleb Toliver; Kobe Hood; Spikes; Bryan Donovan; Brian Nyberg; Derek Lamonica; Donny Moore; Justin Valliere
- Producers: Bbykobe; Spikes

"Tore Up" is a song by American rapper Don Toliver from his fourth studio album, Hardstone Psycho (2024). It was produced by Bbykobe and Spikes.

== Composition and critical reception ==
Robin Murray of Clash commented the "brash" hair metal guitar in the song "feels clumsy". In a review of Hardstone Psycho, Danilo Castro of HotNewHipHop stated that Don Toliver has "never sounded better on solo cuts", mentioning "Tore Up" as an example. Gabriel Bras Nevares of HotNewHipHop described the song to be a "hard-rocking adrenaline rush of boisterous riffs and chants."

== Charts ==
Chart performance for "Tore Up"
Chart (2024)	Peak position
Canada Hot 100 (Billboard)	70
Global 200 (Billboard)	180
New Zealand Hot Singles (RMNZ)	9
US Billboard Hot 100	78
US Hot R&B/Hip-Hop Songs (Billboard)	23

== Certifications ==
Certifications for "Tore Up"
Region	Certification	Certified units/sales
Canada (Music Canada)	Platinum	80,000^{‡}
^{‡} Sales+streaming figures based on certification alone.
