= Body (Don Toliver song) =

2026 single by Don Toliver

Single by Don Toliver

from the album Octane
- Released: February 17, 2026
- Genre: Trap
- Length: 2:35
- Label: Cactus Jack; Donnway & Co; Atlantic
- Songwriters: Caleb Toliver; Justin Timberlake; Pharrell Williams; Charles Hugo; Jacques Webster II; Jaasu Mallory
- Producers: Travis Scott; Jaasu; Bnyx; Jahaan Sweet

Don Toliver singles chronology
"ATM" (2026)	"Body" (2026)	"Creepin" (2026)

"Body" is a song by American rapper and singer Don Toliver. It was initially released on January 30, 2026, as the second track on his fifth studio album, Octane, and was sent to US rhythmic contemporary radio on February 17 as the album's third single. It was produced by Travis Scott, Jaasu, Bnyx and Jahaan Sweet. The song contains a sample of "Rock Your Body" by Justin Timberlake and has been described as an "electronic-trap melting pot".

== Critical reception ==
Michael Saponara of Billboard ranked it as the eighth best song from Octane, stating "Jaasu's production allows Don to push the envelope here with a tectonic plate-shattering beat". Kayla Torres of Exclaim! wrote that the song's sample "doesn't really land — the production feels awkward, and the melodies forced." Matthew Ritchie of Pitchfork commented "You want to bottle up the odd way he yelps 'Geeker!' on 'Body,'" and "The hyper-repetitive, end-rhyming structure on "Body" is compounded by uninspired writing."

== Charts ==
Chart performance
Chart (2026)	Peak position
Austria (Ö3 Austria Top 40)	62
Canada Hot 100 (Billboard)	21
Germany (GfK)	84
Global 200 (Billboard)	20
Greece International (IFPI)	28
Ireland (IRMA)	58
New Zealand Hot Singles (RMNZ)	3
Nigeria (TurnTable Top 100)	65
Nigeria Airplay (TurnTable)	38
Portugal (AFP)	57
South Africa Streaming (TOSAC)	62
Switzerland (Schweizer Hitparade)	44
UK Hip Hop/R&B (Official Charts)	13
UK Singles (Official Charts)	45
US Billboard Hot 100	14
US Hot R&B/Hip-Hop Songs (Billboard)	3
US Rhythmic Airplay (Billboard)	1

== Certifications ==
Certifications for "Body"
Region	Certification	Certified units/sales
Canada (Music Canada)	Platinum	80,000^{‡}
New Zealand (RMNZ)	Gold	15,000^{‡}
^{‡} Sales+streaming figures based on certification alone.
