= Tiramisu (song) =

2025 single by Don Toliver

Single by Don Toliver

from the album Octane
- Released: September 5, 2025
- Genre: R&B
- Length: 2:18
- Label: Cactus Jack; Donnway & Co; Atlantic
- Songwriters: Caleb Toliver; Kobe Hood; Ronald LaTour Jr.; Damon Hendricks Jr.
- Producers: Cardo; Polo Boy Shawty

Don Toliver singles chronology
"Something Wrong" (2025)	"Tiramisu" (2025)	"3am" (2025)

Music video
- "Tiramisu" on YouTube

"Tiramisu" is a song by American rapper Don Toliver, released on September 5, 2025 as the lead single from his fifth studio album, Octane. It was produced by Cardo and Polo Boy Shawty.

== Composition ==
The song leans toward an R&B sound. Don Toliver performs melodically and also uses a "chirpy, clipped" delivery similar to that of rapper 645AR. The lyrics find him seducing a romantic interest, depicting an intimate relationship that involves sex. He uses the word "tiramisu" as a metaphor in that regard, during the chorus.

== Critical reception ==
The song received generally positive reviews. Bryson "Boom" Paul of HotNewHipHop stated "Ultimately, 'Tiramisu' transcends being a polished R&B single; it's an atmospheric exploration of contradictions—combining romance, intimacy, and melancholy. With this track, Toliver continues to define his space in contemporary hip-hop and R&B through ambiguity and emotional depth." Aaron Williams believed that the song "benefits greatly from Cardo's laid-back but propulsive production, which brings a new dimension out of Toliver's sing-song flow", and Toliver's vocal delivery "works pretty well here". Robin Murray of Clash described it as a "wavey dose of top tier American rap" and "Perhaps the best rap song to be named after an Italian coffee-based dessert this year".

== Music video ==
The music video was released alongside the single. It features obscured shots of Don Toliver, with visuals primarily focusing on women, who appear to be on a nighttime camping trip. The clip also includes driving sequences with burnout, as well as a silhouette figure dancing.

== Charts ==
Chart performance for "Tiramisu"
Chart (2025–2026)	Peak position
Australia Hip Hop/R&B (ARIA)	14
Canada Hot 100 (Billboard)	47
Global 200 (Billboard)	62
Greece International (IFPI)	40
New Zealand Hot Singles (RMNZ)	8
Portugal (AFP)	69
US Billboard Hot 100	35
US Hot R&B/Hip-Hop Songs (Billboard)	12

== Certifications ==
Certifications for "Tiramisu"
Region	Certification	Certified units/sales
Canada (Music Canada)	Platinum	80,000^{‡}
^{‡} Sales+streaming figures based on certification alone.
