= E85 (song) =

2026 single by Don Toliver

Single by Don Toliver

from the album Octane
- Released: March 17, 2026
- Recorded: 2024
- Genre: Rap rock; trap
- Length: 2:33
- Label: Donnway & Co.; Cactus Jack; Atlantic
- Songwriters: Caleb Toliver; Jacques Webster II; Aaron Cheung; Derek Anderson; Jaasu Mallory; Malcolm Hobert; Charles Ziman; Jonah Cochran
- Producers: Travis Scott; Aaron Paris; 206Derek; Jaasu

Don Toliver singles chronology
"Creepin'" (2026)	"E85" (2026)	"Tuition" (2026)

"E85" is a song by American rapper and singer Don Toliver. It was initially released on January 30, 2026, as the opening track on his fifth studio album, Octane, and was sent to US rhythmic contemporary radio on March 17 as the album's fourth single. It was produced by Travis Scott, Aaron Paris, 206Derek and Jaasu. The song contains a sample of "Chest Pain (I Love)" by Malcolm Todd.

== Composition ==
"E85" is a trap song. It is composed of synthesizers, a string arrangement, and guitar. Don Toliver gives a melodic, crooning performance; lyrically, he fantasizes about a trip with his lover on a desert highway.

== Critical reception ==
The song received generally positive reviews. Michael Saponara of Billboard ranked it as the second best song from Octane, comparing the sampling to Kanye West's musical style and commenting that it "leads to a melodic trap mix that sounds foreign to the ear for listeners, but it's addictive to the point you want more." He added, "His elastic vocals change the song's texture, but his ability to surround all of that chaos with a catchy Dumb & Dumber-referencing chorus is what gives 'E85' a chance to be a hit." Robin Murray of Clash wrote "Crushing opener 'E85' is all thick layers of syrupy synths and bold rhymes, a stadium-worthy introduction." Kayla Torres of Exclaim! considered the song to be one of the strongest moments on Octane, writing that the sample "fully transcends you into Toliver's world, bringing back some of that Hardstone Psycho rock instrumentation, with gritty guitar textures cutting through the haze." Amy Haskour of Pitchfork called the song a contender for 2026 song of the summer, describing it as an "effortless collage of genres".

== Music video ==
Don Toliver performed a medley of the song and "Long Way to Calabasas" on The Tonight Show Starring Jimmy Fallon on January 27, 2026.

The full music video was later released on May 13, 2026, with a cameo appearance by Toliver's girlfriend, Kali Uchis.

== Charts ==
Chart performance for "E85"
Chart (2026)	Peak position
Canada Hot 100 (Billboard)	18
Global 200 (Billboard)	29
Greece International (IFPI)	43
Ireland (IRMA)	55
New Zealand (Recorded Music NZ)	31
Portugal (AFP)	74
Slovakia Singles Digital (ČNS IFPI)	84
South Africa Streaming (TOSAC)	80
Switzerland (Schweizer Hitparade)	87
UK Singles (Official Charts)	44
UK Hip Hop/R&B (Official Charts)	5
US Billboard Hot 100	15
US Hot R&B/Hip-Hop Songs (Billboard)	3
US Pop Airplay (Billboard)	34
US R&B/Hip-Hop Airplay (Billboard)	20
US Rhythmic Airplay (Billboard)	2

== Certifications ==
Certifications for "E85"
Region	Certification	Certified units/sales
Canada (Music Canada)	2× Platinum	160,000^{‡}
New Zealand (RMNZ)	Gold	15,000^{‡}
^{‡} Sales+streaming figures based on certification alone.
