= Around Me =

2022 song by Metro Boomin featuring Don Toliver

Song by Metro Boomin featuring Don Toliver

from the album Heroes & Villains
- Released: December 2, 2022
- Length: 3:11
- Label: Boominati; Republic
- Songwriters: Leland Wayne; Caleb Toliver; Prince85; Simon Park
- Producers: Metro Boomin; Prince85

"Around Me" is a song by American record producer Metro Boomin featuring American rapper Don Toliver from the former's second studio album Heroes & Villains (2022). It was written alongside Simon Park and Prince85, the latter producing it with Metro.

== Composition ==
Charles Lyons-Burt of Slant Magazine cited "Around Me" as an example of the "mournful songs about accepting one's true nature or succumbing to vices" which make up a large part of the album. Peter A. Berry of Complex considered it one of the tracks from Heroes & Villains which "make up a sleek, surrealistic vision of trap guided by the expert hand of its director."

== Critical reception ==
The song was generally positively received. Brady Brickner-Wood of Pitchfork wrote, "Few artists melodically thrive over a Metro beat like Don Toliver, who delivers two of the album's more magnetic vocal performances on 'Too Many Nights' and 'Around Me.'" Robert Blair of HotNewHipHop wrote, "Among the typically exhilarating turns from his tried-and-tested platoon of talent, Don Toliver is one man who seizes every moment that he has on the project. So, when it came time to take the lead on the mesmeric, spacious world of 'Around Me,' it's no surprise that he brought his A-game and continued to steadily switch up as the beat evolved."

== Charts ==
Chart performance for "Around Me"
Chart (2022)	Peak position
Canada Hot 100 (Billboard)	35
France (SNEP)	180
Global 200 (Billboard)	56
US Billboard Hot 100	53
US Hot R&B/Hip-Hop Songs (Billboard)	20

== Certifications ==
Certifications for "Around Me"
Region	Certification	Certified units/sales
Australia (ARIA)	Gold	35,000^{‡}
Canada (Music Canada)	Gold	40,000^{‡}
New Zealand (RMNZ)	Platinum	30,000^{‡}
United Kingdom (BPI)	Silver	200,000^{‡}
Streaming
Greece (IFPI Greece)	Platinum	2,000,000^{†}
^{‡} Sales+streaming figures based on certification alone.^{†} Streaming-only figures based on certification alone.
