= Rendezvous (Don Toliver song) =

2026 song by Don Toliver featuring Yeat

Song by Don Toliver featuring Yeat

from the album Octane
- Released: January 30, 2026
- Length: 2:26
- Label: Cactus Jack; Donnway & Co; Atlantic
- Songwriters: Caleb Toliver; Noah Smith; Derek Anderson; Rio Leyva; Kobe Hood; Bennett Pepple
- Producers: Don Toliver; 206Derek; Leyva; Bbykobe; Bangs

Music video
- "Rendezvous" on YouTube

"Rendezvous" is a song by American rapper Don Toliver featuring American rapper Yeat, from the former's fifth studio album, Octane (2026). The song was produced by Don Toliver, 206Derek, Rio Leyva, Bbykobe and Bangs.

== Composition ==
The track draws on R&B-inflected elements and sees Don Toliver delivering a melodic performance. Lyrically, Yeat fixates on a subject to whom he’s profoundly drawn.

== Critical reception ==
The song received generally positive reviews. Billboard's Michael Saponara ranked it as the sixth best song from Octane, remarking "Yeat slithers while ruminating about an intoxicating lover and Toliver finds his own melodic pocket floating high above the ether." Alexander Cole of HotNewHipHop also considered it one of the album's best songs, stating that the two rappers "work wonderfully together. It's clear that they are firing on all cylinders, and this is a song we will be running back quite a bit." Robin Murray of Clash called it "an earworm-packed bumper that splices Millennial production gloss with 2k26 attitude." Kayla Torres of Exclaim! wrote that the song "in particular stands out, with Yeat delivering a surprisingly smooth, glitchy vocal performance that meshes well with Toliver's style." Pitchfork's Matthew Ritchie commented "The inane, rambling 'Rendezvous,' with Yeat, feels destined for the hottest party at the Texas A&M sophomore dorm."

== Charts ==
Chart performance for "Rendezvous"
| Chart (2026) | Peak position |
|---|---|
| Canada Hot 100 (Billboard) | 40 |
| Global 200 (Billboard) | 49 |
| Greece International (IFPI) | 51 |
| Portugal (AFP) | 82 |
| South Africa Streaming (TOSAC) | 92 |
| US Billboard Hot 100 | 30 |
| US Hot R&B/Hip-Hop Songs (Billboard) | 10 |

== Certifications ==
Certifications for "Rendezvous"
| Region | Certification | Certified units/sales |
|---|---|---|
| Canada (Music Canada) | Gold | 40,000^{‡} |
^{‡} Sales+streaming figures based on certification alone.
