= ATM (Don Toliver song) =

2026 single by Don Toliver

Single by Don Toliver

from the album Octane
- Released: January 23, 2026
- Genre: Trap
- Length: 3:00
- Label: Cactus Jack; Donnway & Co; Atlantic
- Songwriters: Caleb Toliver; Carlton Mays Jr.; Derek Anderson; Cole Wainwright; John Mitchell
- Producers: Don Toliver; Honorable C.N.O.T.E.; 206Derek; Oh Ross; Prince85

Don Toliver singles chronology
"Satellite" (2025)	"ATM" (2026)	"Body" (2026)

Music video
- "ATM" on YouTube

"ATM" is a song by American rapper Don Toliver, released on January 23, 2026, as the second single from his fifth studio album, Octane (2026). It was produced by Toliver himself, Honorable C.N.O.T.E., 206Derek, Oh Ross and Prince85.

== Composition ==
The song uses trap melodies and synthesizers. It has been described as reminiscent of the "futuristic soundscapes" of N.E.R.D.'s music.

== Critical reception ==
Michael Saponara of Billboard placed "ATM" at number 14 in his ranking of the tracks from Octane, commenting Don Toliver "shrewdly uses his voice as a shifting instrument, ping-ponging off the wall with a punchier flow."

== Music video ==
The music video was filmed at Mount Wilson Observatory and released alongside the single.

== Charts ==
Chart performance for "ATM"
Chart (2026)	Peak position
Australia (ARIA)	79
Canada Hot 100 (Billboard)	29
Global 200 (Billboard)	36
Greece International (IFPI)	29
New Zealand Hot Singles (RMNZ)	3
Portugal (AFP)	65
Romania (Billboard)	13
South Africa Streaming (TOSAC)	79
US Billboard Hot 100	25
US Hot R&B/Hip-Hop Songs (Billboard)	8

== Certifications ==
Certifications for "ATM"
Region	Certification	Certified units/sales
Canada (Music Canada)	Gold	40,000^{‡}
^{‡} Sales+streaming figures based on certification alone.
