= What You Need (Don Toliver song) =

2021 single by Don Toliver

Single by Don Toliver

from the album Life of a Don
- Released: May 4, 2021
- Length: 3:38
- Label: Cactus Jack; Atlantic; We Run It
- Songwriters: Caleb Toliver; Chauncey Hollis Jr.; Dustin Corbett; Dylan Wiggins
- Producers: Hit-Boy; Corbett; Sir Dylan

Don Toliver singles chronology
"Mystery Lady" (2020)	"What You Need" (2021)	"His & Hers" (2021)

Music video
- "What You Need" on YouTube

"What You Need" is a song by American rapper and singer Don Toliver. It was released through Cactus Jack, Atlantic Records, and We Run It Entertainment as the lead single from his second studio album, Life of a Don, on May 4, 2021. Toliver wrote the song with producers Hit-Boy, Corbett, and Sir Dylan.

== Background ==
A snippet of the song was teased on social media in April 2021. The song leaked on to the internet a few hours before its official release on May 4, 2021, after it was accidentally released on Apple Music by his label.

== Music video ==
The music video was also released on YouTube on May 4, 2021. Kali Uchis makes a cameo appearance in the beginning of the video.

== Charts ==
Chart performance for "What You Need"
Chart (2021)	Peak position
Canada (Canadian Hot 100)	87
Global 200 (Billboard)	123
New Zealand Hot Singles (RMNZ)	26
South Africa (RISA)	63
US Billboard Hot 100	82
US Hot R&B/Hip-Hop Songs (Billboard)	34
US Rhythmic Airplay (Billboard)	22

== Certifications ==
Certifications for "What You Need"
Region	Certification	Certified units/sales
Canada (Music Canada)	Gold	40,000^{‡}
United States (RIAA)	Gold	500,000^{‡}
^{‡} Sales+streaming figures based on certification alone.
