= No Pole =

2023 song by Don Toliver

Single by Don Toliver

from the album Love Sick (Deluxe)
- Released: February 28, 2023
- Length: 3:07
- Label: Cactus Jack; Atlantic
- Songwriters: Caleb Toliver; Ronald LaTour, Jr.; Marqus Brown; Douglas Ford
- Producers: Cardo; DJ Fresh

Don Toliver singles chronology
"Hide It" (2024)	"No Pole" (2023)	"LV Bag" (2025)

Music video
- "No Pole" on YouTube

"No Pole" is a song by American rapper and singer Don Toliver. It was released through Cactus Jack and Atlantic Records as the first track from the deluxe edition of his third studio album, Love Sick, on February 28, 2023. Toliver wrote the song with producers Cardo and DJ Fresh, alongside Dougie F. The song gained mainstream popularity over a year and a half after its release due to its use on the online video platform TikTok.

== Composition and critical reception ==
Maximilian Diehl of HotNewHipHop felt that Toliver's "as the opening track on the record, one would hope for a good introduction", but "this certainly fails at that point, and it also serves as a good signpost for the rest of the album". In an opposite review, Regina Cho of Revolt opined that "finds Toliver in his comfort zone with a moody instrumental for his descriptive lyrics". While performing the song live, Toliver sings new vocals over the live instrumental at the end instead of singing the second verse.

== Charts ==
=== Weekly charts ===
Weekly chart performance for "No Pole"
Chart (2024–2025)	Peak position
Australia (ARIA)	88
Australia Hip Hop/R&B (ARIA)	14
Canada Hot 100 (Billboard)	53
Global 200 (Billboard)	106
Greece International (IFPI)	32
Ireland (IRMA)	75
Latvia (LaIPA)	16
Lithuania (AGATA)	43
UK Singles (Official Charts)	69
UK Hip Hop/R&B (Official Charts)	31
US Billboard Hot 100	66
US Hot R&B/Hip-Hop Songs (Billboard)	11
US Rhythmic Airplay (Billboard)	14

=== Year-end charts ===
Year-end chart performance for "No Pole"
Chart (2025)	Position
Global 200 (Billboard)	182
US Billboard Hot 100	97
US Hot R&B/Hip-Hop Songs (Billboard)	22

== Certifications ==
Certifications for "No Pole"
Region	Certification	Certified units/sales
Australia (ARIA)	2× Platinum	140,000^{‡}
Canada (Music Canada)	Platinum	80,000^{‡}
France (SNEP)	Gold	100,000^{‡}
New Zealand (RMNZ)	2× Platinum	60,000^{‡}
Poland (ZPAV)	Gold	62,500^{‡}
Portugal (AFP)	Gold	5,000^{‡}
United Kingdom (BPI)	Silver	200,000^{‡}
United States (RIAA)	2× Platinum	2,000,000^{‡}
Streaming
Greece (IFPI Greece)	Platinum	2,000,000^{†}
^{‡} Sales+streaming figures based on certification alone.^{†} Streaming-only figures based on certification alone.
