= Too Many Nights =

2022 song by Metro Boomin and Future featuring Don Toliver

Song by Metro Boomin and Future featuring Don Toliver

from the album Heroes & Villains
- Released: December 2, 2022
- Genre: Trap
- Length: 3:19
- Label: Boominati; Republic
- Songwriters: Leland Wayne; Nayvadius Wilburn; Caleb Toliver; Carlton Mays, Jr.; Allen Ritter
- Producers: Metro Boomin; Honorable C.N.O.T.E.; Ritter (co.)

Music video
- "Too Many Nights" on YouTube

"Too Many Nights" is a song by American record producer Metro Boomin and American rapper Future featuring fellow American rapper Don Toliver, from Metro's second studio album Heroes & Villains (2022). It was written by the artists alongside Honorable C.N.O.T.E. and Allen Ritter, who produced it with Metro.

== Critical reception ==
The song was met with generally positive reviews from music critics. Robin Murray of Clash wrote, "Indeed, Don provides one of the early highlights, with his epic verse on Future team-up 'Too Many Nights'." Peter A. Berry of Complex described the song "piles elastic Don Toliver melodies for a track that feels a little like an acid trip—the opiate effect of sounds that become their own experiences." Brady Brickner-Wood of Pitchfork wrote, "Few artists melodically thrive over a Metro beat like Don Toliver, who delivers two of the album's more magnetic vocal performances on 'Too Many Nights' and 'Around Me'."

== Charts ==
=== Weekly charts ===
Weekly chart performance for "Too Many Nights"
Chart (2022–2023)	Peak position
Australia (ARIA)	55
Canada Hot 100 (Billboard)	12
Global 200 (Billboard)	23
Greece (Billboard)	18
Iceland (Billboard)	20
Ireland (IRMA)	59
Latvia (LAIPA)	12
Lithuania (AGATA)	28
MENA (IFPI)	19
New Zealand (Recorded Music NZ)	27
Portugal (Billboard)	22
Romania (Billboard)	21
South Africa (Billboard)	18
UK Singles (OCC)	68
US Billboard Hot 100	22
US Hot R&B/Hip-Hop Songs (Billboard)	6

=== Year-end charts ===
Year-end chart performance for "Too Many Nights"
Chart (2023)	Position
Canada (Canadian Hot 100)	83
Global 200 (Billboard)	139
US Hot R&B/Hip-Hop Songs (Billboard)	40

== Certifications ==
Certifications for "Too Many Nights"
Region	Certification	Certified units/sales
Australia (ARIA)	2× Platinum	140,000^{‡}
Canada (Music Canada)	Platinum	80,000^{‡}
Denmark (IFPI Danmark)	Gold	45,000^{‡}
France (SNEP)	Platinum	200,000^{‡}
Germany (BVMI)	Gold	300,000^{‡}
Italy (FIMI)	Gold	50,000^{‡}
New Zealand (RMNZ)	Platinum	30,000^{‡}
Poland (ZPAV)	Platinum	50,000^{‡}
Portugal (AFP)	Platinum	10,000^{‡}
Spain (PROMUSICAE)	Gold	30,000^{‡}
Switzerland (IFPI Switzerland)	Gold	10,000^{‡}
United Kingdom (BPI)	Platinum	600,000^{‡}
United States (RIAA)	3× Platinum	3,000,000^{‡}
Streaming
Greece (IFPI Greece)	3× Platinum	6,000,000^{†}
^{‡} Sales+streaming figures based on certification alone.^{†} Streaming-only figures based on certification alone.
