= Can't Say =

2018 song by Travis Scott featuring Don Toliver

Song by Travis Scott featuring Don Toliver

from the album Astroworld
- Released: August 3, 2018
- Genre: Trap
- Length: 3:18
- Label: Grand Hustle; Epic; Cactus Jack
- Songwriters: Jacques Webster; Caleb Toliver; Mike Dean; Ebony Oshunrinde; James Cyr
- Producers: WondaGurl; London Cyr (co.); Dean (co.)

Music video
- "Can't Say" on YouTube

"Can't Say" (stylized in all caps) is a song by American rapper and singer Travis Scott from his third studio album Astroworld (2018). The song features fellow American rapper and singer Don Toliver, and is the song that broke him into the mainstream. The song was written alongside producers WondaGurl, Mike Dean, and London Cyr, and samples "25 Lighters" by DJ DMD featuring Fat Pat and Lil' Keke. In the song, the artists rap about taking drugs and seducing women.

== Critical reception ==
Kiana Fitzgerald gave the song a positive review in a Complex article, praising the switching of beats as well as the sample. She wrote, "Alongside Scott's Auto-Tune'd crooning and Fat Pat's deepened voice, Toliver's vocals stand out, thin and vibrant, like an oboe letting loose in a solo."

== Music video ==
The music video was released on February 5, 2019. Directed by Nathalie Canguilhem and produced by Yves Saint Laurent, it features a purple hue and CGI. In the video, Travis Scott leads a group of dirt bike riders, all dressed in Saint Laurent suits and pulling stunts on a futuristic highway. Scott stands on a moving motorcycle while the cyclists behind him "pop wheelies". In one scene, a nude woman is crucified on a neon-lit cross with speakers. At another point in the video, a herd of horses run through an empty tunnel while clones of Travis Scott ride in glowing go-karts.

== Personnel ==
Credits adapted from Qobuz.

Performers

- Travis Scott – vocals
- Don Toliver – vocals
- John Mayer – guitar

Production

- Frank Dukes – producer
- Wondagurl – producer
- Mike Dean – mastering engineer, mixer, assistant producer
- London Cyr – co-producer
- Zach Steele – recording engineer
- Jimmy Cash – assistant engineer, recording engineer
- Sean Solymor – assistant engineer
- Skyler McLean – assistant engineer

== Charts ==
Chart (2018)	Peak position
Canada Hot 100 (Billboard)	35
France (SNEP)	128
Portugal (AFP)	63
Sweden Heatseeker (Sverigetopplistan)	9
US Billboard Hot 100	38
US Hot R&B/Hip-Hop Songs (Billboard)	24

== Certifications ==
Region	Certification	Certified units/sales
Australia (ARIA)	Platinum	70,000^{‡}
Brazil (Pro-Música Brasil)	3× Platinum	120,000^{‡}
Canada (Music Canada)	3× Platinum	240,000^{‡}
Denmark (IFPI Danmark)	Gold	45,000^{‡}
France (SNEP)	Gold	100,000^{‡}
Italy (FIMI)	Gold	35,000^{‡}
New Zealand (RMNZ)	2× Platinum	60,000^{‡}
Poland (ZPAV)	Platinum	50,000^{‡}
United Kingdom (BPI)	Platinum	600,000^{‡}
United States (RIAA)	4× Platinum	4,000,000^{‡}
^{‡} Sales+streaming figures based on certification alone.
