= Don Toliver =

American rapper and singer-songwriter (born 1994)

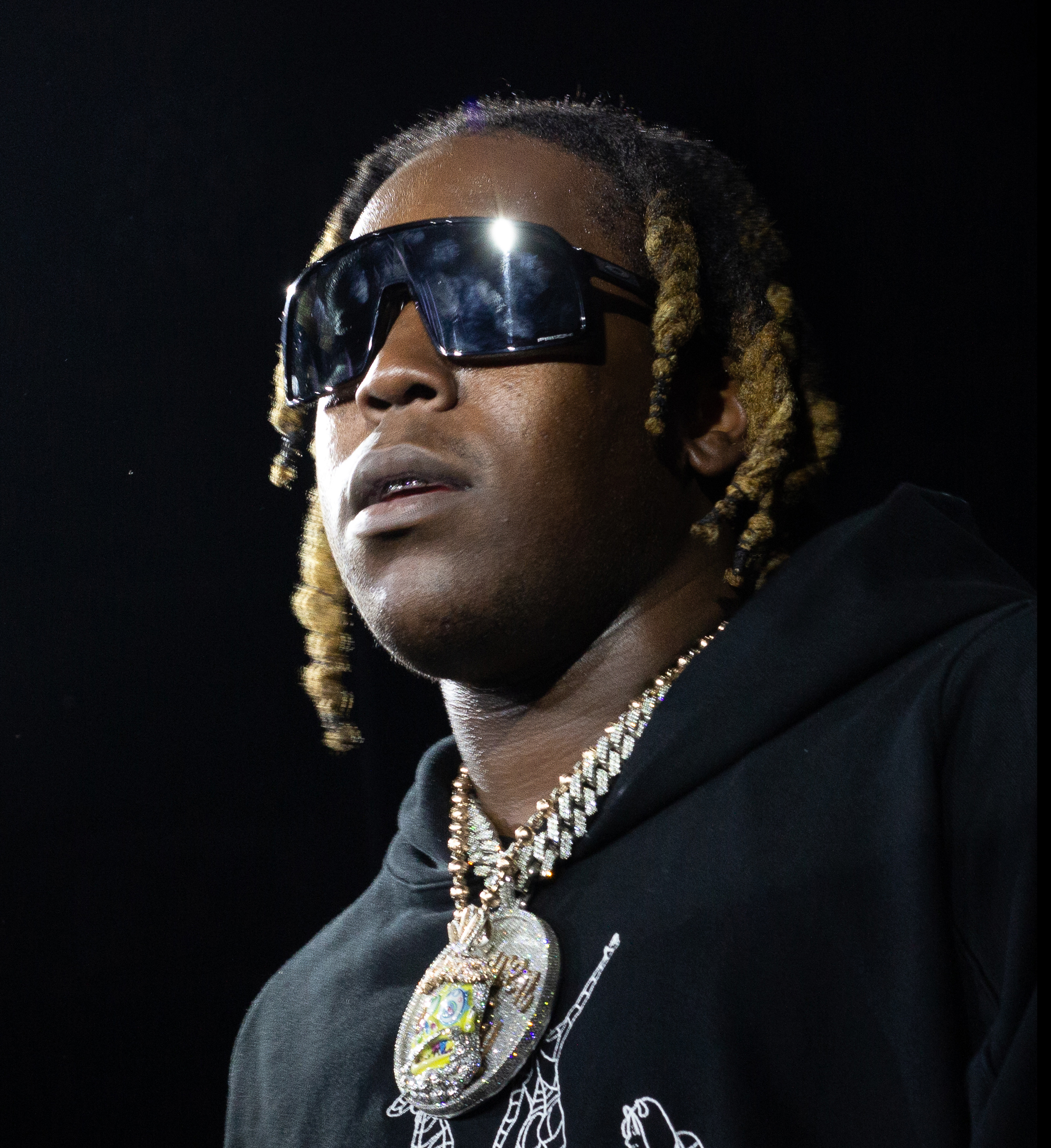
- Toliver in 2021

Background information
- Born: Caleb Zackery Toliver; June 12, 1994 (age 32); Houston, Texas, U.S.
- Genres: Hip-hop; trap; psychedelic rap; R&B
- Occupations: Rapper; singer; songwriter
- Works: Discography
- Years active: 2015–present
- Labels: Cactus Jack; Atlantic; APG; Donnway & Co; We Run It
- Partner: Kali Uchis (2020–present)
- Children: 1
- Website: dontolivermusic.com

Logo
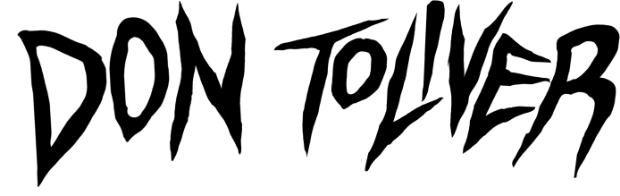

Caleb Zackery "Don" Toliver (/ˈtɒləvər/ TOL-ə-vər; born June 12, 1994) is an American rapper, singer and songwriter. His debut mixtape, Donny Womack (2018), was released one day prior to fellow Houston rapper Travis Scott's album Astroworld, on which Toliver made a guest appearance. In the following week, he signed with Scott's record label, Cactus Jack Records, in a joint venture with Atlantic Records.

As a lead artist, he gained stronger recognition with his 2019 single, "No Idea" and his 2020 single "After Party", both of which entered the Billboard Hot 100 and received triple platinum certifications by the Recording Industry Association of America (RIAA). Both songs first gained viral popularity on the video-hosting service TikTok, and preceded his debut studio album, Heaven or Hell (2020). A critical and commercial success, it peaked within the top ten of the Billboard 200 along with his second and third albums, Life of a Don (2021) and Love Sick (2023). He guest appeared alongside Nav and Gunna on Internet Money's 2020 single "Lemonade", which peaked within the top ten of the Billboard Hot 100.

His trap-centered fourth studio album, Hardstone Psycho (2024) peaked at number three on the Billboard 200 and was led by the top 40 single, "Bandit". His fifth studio album, Octane (2026) became his first number-one album and was supported by the singles "Tiramisu" and "ATM". His sixth album, Nitrous (2026) is set to release on December 4.

== Early life ==
Toliver was raised in the Alief neighborhood of Houston, Texas. Alief is sometimes known as S.W.A.T. (South West Alief Texas). Performers such as Beyonce and Lizzo also came from this area. He attended Alief Hastings High School. His father was a singer and rapper associated with independent Houston record label Swishahouse, and would commonly play music around him growing up. Don grew up listening to Michael Jackson and Usher. He was also influenced by listening to Swishahouse Classics.

== Career ==
=== 2017–2019: Playa Familia and singles ===
Toliver's first release was a 2017 collaborative mixtape with Yungjosh93 titled Playa Familia. In late 2017, Toliver released the solo singles, "I Gotta" and "Diva". In March 2018, he signed to Atlantic Records and rapper Chedda Da Connect's record label We Run It Entertainment, in conjunction with Artist Partner Group. Also in early 2018, Toliver released "Make Sumn" and "Checks", each accompanied with music videos. In July 2018, Toliver released the single "Holdin' Steel" featuring Dice Soho. The song was also accompanied by a music video. On August 2, Toliver released his major label debut mixtape, Donny Womack, along with a music video for the song "Diamonds". Travis Scott became aware of Toliver and invited him to many sessions. Toliver later called Scott "the OG, my CEO".

The following day, on August 3, 2018, Travis Scott released his third studio album, Astroworld, on which Toliver was featured on the 13th track, "Can't Say". The single was later accompanied by a video that was sponsored by Yves Saint Laurent. On August 6, it was announced that Toliver had signed to Scott's Cactus Jack imprint label. Toliver appeared alongside Scott, Nav, Sheck Wes and Gunna in the music video for Nav's single "Champion", which Scott was featured on. In September, his single "Diva" was later remixed by rapper Kevin Gates.

After his appearance on Astroworld, Toliver released several singles under the Cactus Jack label throughout 2019 including: "Back Up" featuring Wiz Khalifa, "Best You Had", "Can't Feel My Legs", and "No Idea". The song "No Idea" eventually became a viral sensation on social media/video sharing platform TikTok. In November 2019, Toliver accompanied Scott during the second Astroworld Festival. On December 13, Toliver released the music video for "Can't Feel My Legs". Toliver featured on the December 2019 Cactus Jack compilation album JackBoys.

He is featured on American rapper Eminem's January 2020 album, Music to Be Murdered By, on the song "No Regrets". In February 2020, The Weeknd announced Toliver as an opener for his After Hours til Dawn Tour alongside Sabrina Claudio and 88Glam, however due to the COVID-19 pandemic, the tour was postponed and rescheduled without Toliver.

=== 2020–2022: Heaven or Hell and Life of a Don ===
Toliver released his debut studio album, Heaven or Hell, on March 13, 2020, with guest appearances from Travis Scott, Kaash Paige, Quavo, Offset, and Sheck Wes. On May 8, 2020, Toliver was featured on Nav's song "Recap", from the latter's third studio album, Good Intentions. On July 24, 2020, Toliver and his DJ Chase B released a collaborative single titled "Cafeteria", featuring Gunna, from their upcoming collaborative project, Escapism. Exactly one week later, on July 31, he released a song titled "Clap", for the soundtrack of the film F9, in which the soundtrack was released on the same day, and the song became the seventh single. On August 14, 2020, Toliver was featured alongside Nav on "Lemonade" by Internet Money and Gunna, his first top 10 song on the Billboard Hot 100 chart. On the same day, he was featured on Kaash Paige's song "Grammy Week", from her debut studio album, Teenage Fever. Exactly one week later, on August 21, he was featured alongside Big Sean on Nas' song "Replace Me", from his thirteenth studio album, King's Disease. On October 22, he was featured alongside Gucci Mane on Rico Nasty's single "Don't Like Me", from the latter's debut studio album, Nightmare Vacation.

In February 2021, Toliver teased his next project, titled Life of a Don, on Twitter. On May 4, Toliver released the lead single, "What You Need". One month later on June 18, Toliver released the second single from the album, "Drugs N Hella Melodies", featuring his girlfriend, American singer Kali Uchis. On August 20, 2021, Toliver released the single "Don't Go", a collaboration with American record producer Skrillex and Canadian singer Justin Bieber. On August 29, Toliver appeared on Kanye West's album Donda on the track "Moon", alongside Kid Cudi.

On September 28, Toliver revealed the release date and cover art for Life of a Don. Life of a Don was released on October 8, 2021. The album included features from Travis Scott, Kali Uchis, SoFaygo, Baby Keem, and HVN. On February 24, 2022, Toliver appeared on a second track with West, "Broken Road" on West's album, Donda 2. On April 22, he appeared on Pusha T's song "Scrape It Off" from his album It's Almost Dry alongside Lil Uzi Vert. Exactly one week later, on April 29, he was featured on the single "Honest" by Justin Bieber, and the two artists performed it live for the Justice World Tour in Houston the same day and two days later in Dallas. On August 26, 2022, he was featured on DJ Khaled's album God Did on the track "Lets Pray" along with Travis Scott. On September 9, he collaborated with Nav on the song "One Time" from his album Demons Protected by Angels featuring Future. On November 18, he released the single "Do It Right". On December 2, he was featured numerous times on Metro Boomin's album Heroes & Villains on the tracks "Too Many Nights" (with Future), "Around Me", and "I Can't Save You (Interlude) (with Future)".

=== 2023–present: Love Sick, Hardstone Psycho, and Octane ===
On February 14, 2023, Toliver announced his third studio album, Love Sick. Following this announcement, the single "4 Me", featuring Kali Uchis, was released on February 15. On February 17, Toliver released the single "Leave the Club", featuring Lil Durk and GloRilla, and confirmed that Love Sick would be released on February 24. The deluxe version of Love Sick was released on February 28, 2023, including four additional tracks. Among these tracks were "Luckily I'm Having", featuring Teezo Touchdown, "Embarrassed", with labelmate Travis Scott, and "No Pole", the latter of which went viral on TikTok.

He was also featured on Kali Uchis' song "Fantasy", released on March 3 as part of her album, Red Moon in Venus. On March 12, 2024, Toliver announced his fourth studio album, Hardstone Psycho. The album's promotion began with the release of the single "Bandit" on February 1. Following this, another single, "Deep in the Water", was released on March 15. On May 3, Toliver was featured on Yeat's single "Heavy Stunts". Later that month, on May 22, he released "Attitude" featuring Charlie Wilson and Cash Cobain, and announced the album release date the same day. Hardstone Psycho was released on June 14.

On July 13, 2025, Toliver, along with the other members of Jackboys, released the collaborative album, JackBoys 2. On September 5, 2025, Toliver released "Tiramisu" as the lead single for his new album, Octane. On January 22, 2026, Toliver released a trailer for the album on all social media platforms with a release date of January 30. On January 30, Toliver released Octane, with 18 songs, such as "E85", "Rendezvous", featuring Yeat, "TMU", "Rosary", featuring Travis Scott, and "Body".

== Artistry ==
Toliver has cited his father, Sade, Dom Kennedy, Teddy Pendergrass, Paul Wall, Mike Jones, and Travis Scott as influences on his music.

== Personal life ==
He has been dating American singer Kali Uchis since 2020. In January 2024, he announced he was expecting his first child with Uchis; two months later, she gave birth to their son. On March 14, Toliver released the music video for his song "Deep in the Water", which was dedicated to Kali Uchis and their son.

== Discography ==
- Heaven or Hell (2020)
- Life of a Don (2021)
- Love Sick (2023)
- Hardstone Psycho (2024)
- Octane (2026)
- Nitrous (2026)

== Concert tours ==
Headlining

- Life of a Don Tour (2021)
- Love Sick Tour (2023)
- Psycho Tour (2024–2025)
- Octane World Tour (2026)
- Nitrous: Octane World Tour Leg 2 (2026)

Supporting

- Future - One Big Party Tour (2023)
- Travis Scott - Circus Maximus Tour (2024)
- Post Malone - Big Ass Stadium Tour (2026)

== Awards and nominations ==
=== American Music Awards ===
The American Music Awards is an annual American music awards show that awards outstanding achievements in the music industry.

| Year | Nominated work | Award | Result | Ref. |
|---|---|---|---|---|
| 2021 | "Lemonade" | Favorite Hip-Hop Song | Nominated | |
| 2026 | Himself | Best Male Hip-Hop Artist | Nominated | |
| 2026 | Octane | Best Hip-Hop album | Nominated | |

=== Berlin Music Video Awards ===
The Berlin Music Video Awards is an international festival that promotes the art of music videos.

| Year | Nominated work | Award | Result | Ref. |
|---|---|---|---|---|
| 2025 | "Tore Up" | Best AI | Nominated | |
| 2026 | "SOMETHING WRONG" (ft. DJ SNAKE) | Best AI | Nominated | |

=== BET Awards ===
The BET Awards are an annual American award show established in 2001 by the Black Entertainment Television network to celebrate African Americans and other minorities in music, acting, sports, and philanthropy.

| Year | Nominated work | Award | Result | Ref. |
|---|---|---|---|---|
| 2026 | Himself | Best Male Hip Hop Artist | Nominated | |

=== BET Hiphop Awards ===
The BET hiphop awards are an award show hosted by BET focussed on HipHop Music

| Year | Nominated work | Award | Result | Ref. |
|---|---|---|---|---|
| 2021 | Himself | Best New Hiphop Artist | Nominated | |

=== Billboard Music Awards ===
Award show hosted by billboard

| Year | Nominated work | Award | Result | Ref. |
|---|---|---|---|---|
| 2023 | "Soweto" | Top Afrobeats Song | Nominated | |

=== Grammy Awards ===
The Grammy's are the biggest and most prestigious award show in music.

| Year | Nominated work | Award | Result | Ref. |
|---|---|---|---|---|
| 2022 | Donda | Album Of The Year | Nominated | |
| 2027 | Himself | Best New Artist | Pending | |
| 2027 | Octane | Best Rap Album | Pending | |
| 2027 | "Body" | Best Rap Performance | Pending | |
| 2027 | "E85" | Best Rap Song | Pending | |
| 2027 | "E85" | Best Melodic Rap Performance | Pending | |

=== Hollywood Music In Media Awards ===
| Year | Nominated work | Award | Result | Ref. |
|---|---|---|---|---|
| 2025 | "Lose My Mind" | Best Original Song in A Feature Film | Nominated | |

=== MTV Video Music Awards ===
The VMA's are an award show that recognize music videos.

| Year | Nominated work | Award | Result | Ref. |
|---|---|---|---|---|
| 2026 | "E85" | Best Hip-Hop | Nominated | |
