= Life of a Don Tour =

2021 concert tour by Don Toliver

- Tour by Don Toliver
- Location: North America
- Associated album: Life of a Don
- Start date: September 18, 2021
- End date: December 12, 2021
- No. of shows: 28
- Producer: Live Nation

Don Toliver concert chronology
- Life of a Don Tour (2021); Love Sick Tour (2023)

The Life of a Don Tour was the debut headlining concert tour by Don Toliver, staged in support of his second studio album, Life of a Don (2021). The tour marked Toliver’s first official headlining run and took place across North America between September and December 2021.

Announced on August 23, 2021, via Toliver’s Instagram account, the tour accompanied the rollout of Life of a Don, which expanded the artist’s melodic trap sound and solidified his position within contemporary hip-hop and R&B.

== Setlist ==
1. "After Party"
2. "2 Lil Shorty"
3. "Backend"
4. "Cardigan"
5. "What You Need"
6. "Can't Say"
7. "Recap"
8. "Gang Gang"
9. "Had Enough"
10. "His & Hers"
11. "Company"
12. "Drugs N Hella Melodies"
13. "Euphoria"
14. "Moon"
15. "Don't"
16. "Cafeteria"
17. "What to Do?"
18. "No Photos"
19. "Lemonade"
20. "No Idea"
21. "BOGUS"

== Tour dates ==
List of 2021 concerts
Date	City	Country	Venue	Opening act	Attendance	Revenue
September 18, 2021 (Note: Part of the Life Is Beautiful Music & Art Festival)	Las Vegas	United States	Las Vegas Festival Grounds	—N/a	—N/a	—N/a
September 19, 2021	Tempe (Note: Labeled as Phoenix)	United States	Marquee Theatre	Bia	—	—
September 20, 2021	Austin	United States	Stubb’s Waller Creek Amphitheater	Bia	—	—
September 21, 2021	Oklahoma City	United States	The Criterion	Bia	—	—
September 22, 2021	St Louis	United States	The Factory	Bia	—	—
September 24, 2021	Milwaukee	United States	The Rave/Eagles Club	Bia	—	—
September 25, 2021	Chicago	United States	Aragon Ballroom	Bia	—	—
September 28, 2021	Cleveland	United States	Temple Live	Bia	—	—
September 29, 2021	Detroit	United States	The Fillmore Detroit	Bia	—	—
September 30, 2021	Pittsburgh	United States	Stage AE	Bia	—	—
October 2, 2021	New York City	United States	The Rooftop at Pier 17	Bia	—	—
October 3, 2021	Montclair	United States	Wellmont Theater	Bia	—	—
October 4, 2021	Boston	United States	House of Blues	Bia	—	—
October 6, 2021	Wallingford	United States	Toyota Oakdale Theatre	Bia	—	—
October 7, 2021	Philadelphia	United States	The Fillmore	Bia	—	—
October 10, 2021	Washington, D.C.	United States	Echostage	Bia	—	—
October 12, 2021	Raleigh	United States	The Ritz	Bia	—	—
October 13, 2021	Charlotte	United States	The Fillmore	Bia	—	—
October 15, 2021	Miami	United States	The Oasis	Bia	—	—
October 17, 2021	Atlanta	United States	Coca-Cola Roxy	Bia	—	—
October 20, 2021	Houston	United States	Bayou Music Center	Bia	—	—
October 22, 2021	Dallas	United States	The Bomb Factory	Bia	—	—
October 24, 2021	Denver	United States	Fillmore Auditorium	Bia	—	—
October 25, 2021	Salt Lake City	United States	The Complex	Bia	—	—
October 30, 2021	Los Angeles	United States	Hollywood Palladium	Bia	—	—
November 5, 2021 (Note: Part of the Astroworld Festival)	Houston	United States	NRG Park	—N/a	—N/a	—N/a
November 14, 2021 (Note: Part of the Day N Vegas)	Las Vegas	United States	Las Vegas Festival Grounds	—N/a	—N/a	—N/a
December 12, 2021 (Note: Part of the Rolling Loud)	San Bernardino	United States	NOS Events Center	—N/a	—N/a	—N/a
Total
