= Never Sleep Tour =

2023 concert tour by Nav

- Tour by Nav
- Associated album: Demons Protected by Angels
- Start date: February 14, 2023
- End date: April 11, 2023
- Legs: 1
- No. of shows: 22

Nav concert chronology
- Bad Habits Tour (2019); Never Sleep Tour (2023); ...

The Never Sleep Tour was the third concert tour by Canadian rapper Nav, in promotion of his fourth studio album, Demons Protected by Angels (2022). The tour began on February 14, 2023, at the Fillmore in Minneapolis, Minnesota, and ended on April 11, 2023, at the Scotiabank Arena in his hometown of Toronto, Canada. Canadian singer RealestK and American rapper SoFaygo served as the opening acts for the tour. American singer Bryson Tiller was supposed to make an appearance at the show in Toronto but pulled out due to his right eardrum being damaged. The tour is named after "Never Sleep", the lead single from the album.

== Setlist ==
This set list is representative of the show in Minneapolis, Minnesota on February 14, 2023. It is not representative of all concerts for the duration of the tour.

1. "Never Sleep"
2. "To My Grave"
3. "Baby"
4. "Know Me"
5. "Dead Shot"
6. "ASAP Ferg"
7. "Minute"
8. "Did You See Nav?"
9. "Wanted You"
10. "One Time"
11. "Last of the Mohicans"
12. "Beibs in the Trap" (originally performed by Travis Scott)
13. "Demons in My Cup"
14. "Up"
15. "Good for It"
16. "TTD"
17. "Myself"
18. "Tap"
19. "No Debate"
20. "Baguettes in the Face" (originally performed by Mustard)
21. "Taking Chances"
22. "Recap"
23. "Lost Me" (with RealestK)
24. "Interstellar"
25. "Tension"
26. "Held Me Down"
27. "Call Me"
28. "Champion"
29. "Lemonade" (originally performed by Internet Money, Gunna, and Don Toliver)
30. "Turks"

=== Additional notes ===
- Starting from the show in Chicago on February 15, "Taking Chances" was removed from the set list.
- During the show in Detroit on February 18, Nav brought Babyface Ray out to perform "Mismatch" with him and "Paperwork Party" after "Recap", which replaced "Lost Me".
- Starting from the show in New York on February 25, "Last of the Mohicans", "Lost Me", and "Tension" were removed from the set list and Nav did not perform "Demons in My Cup". He performed "Wolves" (originally performed by Pop Smoke) and "Jesse Owens" (originally performed by Rowdy Rebel) after "Held Me Down" and moved "Interstellar" and "Tap" to after them.
- Starting from the show in Raleigh on February 28, Nav performed "Friends & Family" after "Recap". "Tap" was moved to the song after the former and "Interstellar" was moved to the next song.
- During the show in Atlanta on March 1, Nav brought Lil Gotit out to perform "Burnt n Turnt" (a collaboration with him) with him and played "Nameless" (originally performed by the latter's late older brother, Lil Keed) after "Friends & Family". He also performed "Interstellar" and brought Meek Mill out to perform "Tap" after.
- Starting from the show in Austin on March 3, "Demons in My Cup" was removed from the set list.
- Starting from the show in Vancouver on March 12, "Friends & Family" was removed from the set list.
- During the show in San Francisco on March 16, "Interstellar" was performed after "Recap". Nav brought 22nd Jim out to perform "No Pressure" and performed "Tap" after.
- During the show in Los Angeles on March 21, Nav performed "Some Way" and brought G Herbo out to perform "Who Want Smoke??" (originally performed by Nardo Wick) after "Recap". He also replaced "Interstellar" with "Fell in Love".
- During the show in his hometown of Toronto on April 11, Nav adjusted the set list by moving the order of songs, as well as adding and removing songs to accommodate performing songs with special guests. Before bringing anyone out, he started off with the first nine songs from the regular setlist and "Up". He then brought Meek Mill out to perform "Tap" with him and "Dreams and Nightmares", and then brought Lola Brooke out to perform "Don't Play with It". Nav then performed "Lemonade", "Good for It", "TTD", "Myself", "No Debate", "Baguettes in the Face", "Held Me Down", and "Call Me". He then brought Travis Scott out to perform "Beibs in the Trap" and "Champion" with him and then went backstage for a short break as the latter performed his own hit singles, "Antidote" and "Sicko Mode". Nav then came back onstage and finished the show with "Turks".

== Tour dates ==
Date	City	Country	Venue
North America
February 14, 2023	Minneapolis	United States	The Fillmore Minneapolis
February 15, 2023	Chicago	United States	Byline Bank Aragon Ballroom
February 17, 2023	Indianapolis	United States	Old National Centre
February 18, 2023	Detroit	United States	The Fillmore Detroit
February 21, 2023	Philadelphia	United States	The Met Philadelphia
February 22, 2023	Washington, D.C.	United States	Echostage
February 24, 2023	Boston	United States	MGM Music Hall at Fenway
February 25, 2023	New York City	United States	Hammerstein Ballroom
February 28, 2023	Raleigh	United States	The Ritz
March 1, 2023	Atlanta	United States	Coca-Cola Roxy
March 3, 2023	Austin	United States	Emo's
March 4, 2023	Houston	United States	Bayou Music Center
March 6, 2023	Dallas	United States	South Side Ballroom
March 9, 2023	Denver	United States	The Fillmore Denver
March 12, 2023	Vancouver	Canada	Thunderbird Sports Centre
March 13, 2023	Portland	United States	McMenamins Crystal Ballroom
March 14, 2023	Seattle	United States	Paramount Theatre
March 16, 2023	San Francisco	United States	SF Masonic Auditorium
March 18, 2023	San Diego	United States	Soma
March 20, 2023	Phoenix	United States	The Van Buren
March 21, 2023	Los Angeles	United States	Hollywood Palladium
April 11, 2023	Toronto	Canada	Scotiabank Arena

=== Postponed shows ===
List of postponed concerts, showing date, city, country, venue, and reason for cancellation
Date	City	Country	Venue	Reason
March 10, 2023	Salt Lake City	United States	The Complex	Unknown
