= Down in Atlanta =

2022 single by Pharrell Williams and Travis Scott

Single by Pharrell Williams and Travis Scott

from the album Phriends, Vol. 1
- Released: November 18, 2022
- Genre: Synthwave; funk
- Length: 2:45
- Label: Columbia
- Songwriters: Pharrell Williams; Jacques Webster
- Producer: Pharrell Williams

Pharrell Williams singles chronology
| "Stay with Me" (2022) | "Down in Atlanta" (2022) | "4Eva" (2023) |

Travis Scott singles chronology
| "Never Sleep" (2022) | "Down in Atlanta" (2022) | "Krzy Train" (2023) |

Lyric video
- "Down in Atlanta" on YouTube

"Down in Atlanta" is a song produced by Pharrell Williams and performed by American rapper Travis Scott. Written by the two, it was released as a single through Columbia Records on November 18, 2022. It is Scott's first official release as a lead artist since "Escape Plan" and "Mafia". The artists previously collaborated on the 2018 song, "Skeletons".

== Background and promotion ==
In late August 2022, Williams and Scott were spotted together in a recording studio. The song was first teased a few weeks later and then kept on being teased, and Scott also performed a portion of it live at his "Road to Utopia" residency in Las Vegas. On October 31, 2022, Williams announced that the song would be released four days later, which was however delayed by two weeks for unknown reasons.

== Composition and lyrics ==
Over funk-led production from Williams, Scott sings: "I told shawty to bring the wave / You know life's a beach / She said, 'Life's a bitch' / Let’s hit Magic City". The "spooky production" includes "sly, retro synths", Scott name-drops celebrities from the city of Atlanta in the state of Georgia, while he also boasts about the expensive cars he owns. Jason Lipshutz of Billboard felt that Scott "mixes zonked-out warbling with tales of luxury and fills each line with his larger-than-life persona – while the multi-hyphenate focuses on making each drum-and-synth interaction tingle the listener's senses".

== Credits and personnel ==
- Pharrell Williams – production, songwriting
- Travis Scott – vocals, songwriting
- Manny Marroquin – mixing
- Emerson Mancini – mastering
- Mike Larson – recording
- Anthony Vilchis – engineering assistance
- Trey Station – engineering assistance
- Zach Pereyra – engineering assistance

== Charts ==
Chart performance for "Down in Atlanta"
| Chart (2022) | Peak position |
|---|---|
| Australia (ARIA) | 68 |
| Canada Hot 100 (Billboard) | 56 |
| France (SNEP) | 186 |
| Germany (GfK) | 82 |
| Global 200 (Billboard) | 82 |
| Ireland (IRMA) | 61 |
| Lithuania (AGATA) | 59 |
| Netherlands (Single Top 100) | 69 |
| New Zealand Hot Singles (RMNZ) | 1 |
| Portugal (AFP) | 79 |
| San Marino (SMRRTV Top 50) | 30 |
| Sweden (Sverigetopplistan) | 63 |
| Switzerland (Schweizer Hitparade) | 25 |
| UK Singles (OCC) | 81 |
| US Billboard Hot 100 | 88 |
| US Hot R&B/Hip-Hop Songs (Billboard) | 28 |
