= No Idea =

No Idea may refer to:

- No Idea Records, an American independent record label based in Gainesville, Florida that focuses on punk rock
- "No Idea" (song), a 2019 song by Don Toliver
- "No Idea", a song by Big Time Rush from Elevate, 2011
- "No Idea", a song by Muna from their self-titled album, 2022
- "No Idea", a song by Mary J. Blige from Good Morning Gorgeous, 2022
