= Punk (Young Thug album) =

Studio album by Young Thug
- Released: October 15, 2021
- Recorded: 2018–2021
- Genre: Hip-hop
- Length: 62:50
- Labels: YSL; 300; Atlantic
- Producers: Alec; Ayo Deni; Baby Plugg; Cardo; Charlie Handsome; Crater; DecayOnTheBeat; Dez Wright; Don; Ghetto Guitar; Hitmaka Millz; Jeff Bhasker; Johnny Juliano; K-Notes; Kacey Khaliel; Kanye West; Kuttabeatz; Lee Major; Louis Bell; Metro Boomin; Mu Lean; Nate Ruess; Nuki; Oz; Pi'erre Bourne; Pro Logic; Reske; Rex Kudo; Sean Momberger; Smo; T-Minus; TaeBeast; Taurus; Tommy Parker; Turbo; Verzache; Watt; Wheezy; Wu10; Yo Benji; Yung Exclusive

Young Thug chronology
Slime Language 2 (2021)	Punk (2021)	Business Is Business (2023)

Singles from Punk
- 1. "Bubbly" Released: November 2, 2021

Punk is the second studio album by American rapper Young Thug. It was released on October 15, 2021, through YSL Records and is distributed by Atlantic Records and 300 Entertainment. The album contains guest appearances from Strick, J. Cole, T-Shyne, Gunna, Future, BSlime, Post Malone, ASAP Rocky, Lil Double 0, Drake, Travis Scott, Doja Cat, Nate Ruess, Jeff Bhasker, alongside the late Juice Wrld and Mac Miller. The production on the album was handled by a variety of record producers, including T-Minus, Metro Boomin, Kanye West, Pi'erre Bourne, Wheezy, Oz, Louis Bell, and Watt, among others.

Punk received generally positive reviews from music critics and was a commercial success. The album was supported by the single "Bubbly". It debuted at number one on the US Billboard 200 chart, earning 90,000 album-equivalent units in its first week.

== Background and release ==
In an interview about recording his debut studio album, So Much Fun (2019), Young Thug told The Fader that he wanted to release a follow-up album in the "upcoming weeks". In contrast to his debut, which he described as a "lighthearted work", Punk would be more personal and introspective. He implied that the new album was "touching" and interpreted the meaning of Punk as "brave, not self centered, conscious, very, very neglected, very misunderstood, very patient, very authentic". He said the album would reflect "real rap".

On July 27, 2021, Thug featured on an NPR Tiny Desk home concert, where he performed four new songs and teased an October 15 release date for the album, as seen on the back of his t-shirt. More promotion for Punk is a video published on October 13, 2021, of Thug smashing a $320,000 Rolls-Royce with the word "punk" painted on it in pink.

Following Punk’s release, Thug stated during his appearance on The Breakfast Club that his track "Day Before" with Mac Miller was recorded on the day before Miller's death on September 7, 2018.

== Singles ==
"Bubbly", a collaboration with fellow rappers Drake and Travis Scott, which was sent to US rhythmic radio on November 2, 2021. The song peaked at number 20 on the US Billboard Hot 100.

== Critical reception ==
Professional ratings
Aggregate scores
Source	Rating
Metacritic	78/100
Review scores
Source	Rating
AllMusic	3.5/5 stars
The Arts Desk	3/5 stars
Clash	8/10
HipHopDX	4.0/5
The Line of Best Fit	6/10
NME	5/5 stars
Pitchfork	7.1/10
Rolling Stone	3.5/5 stars

Punk was met with generally positive reviews. At Metacritic, which assigns a normalized rating out of 100 to reviews from professional publications, the album received an average score of 78, based on six reviews.

Kyann-Sian Williams of NME praised the album, stating, "Featuring a masterpiece of a collaboration with the late, great Mac Miller, this hugely inventive second studio album proves Thugger's all-time greatness". Paul A. Thompson from Pitchfork enjoyed the album, saying, "While Young Thug's creative choices after about 2015 have had little sway over emerging trends, Punk suggests that the space he now occupies is one that allows him more room to experiment". Robin Murray of Clash said, "Impactful and often unexpected, PUNK breaks new ground within Young Thug's identity". Rolling Stone critic Jeff Ihaza said, "With his latest album, you get the feeling that these are songs Thug needed to get off of his chest. While not a dazzling record, it opens a door to exciting opportunities". Reviewing the album for AllMusic, Fred Thomas stated, "Punk is relatively odd for an album that debuted at number one on the charts, sneaking some of Young Thug's inherent eccentricity in among its more commercially viable moments".

Armon Sadler of HipHopDX said, "With Punk, Thugger continues to expand his game to the point of reaching true limitlessness; he's like a young, athletic slasher in basketball who expands his repertoire to become well-rounded and achieve longevity in the sport". In a lukewarm review, The Line of Best Fit's Leo Culp wrote, "Punk will likely not be remembered as a great Young Thug album, but we should appreciate that we get to hear him tinker with his sound for when he finally puts it all together again". Writing for The Arts Desk, Harry Thorfinn-George stated, "There are countless rappers who use a similar melodic flow, but none that can so effortlessly find hidden melodies in every beat".

=== Year-end lists ===
Select year-end rankings of Punk
Publication	List	Rank	Ref.
Complex	The Best Albums of 2021	31	
Crack Magazine	The Top 50 Albums of the Year	46	
NME	The 50 Best Albums of 2021	45	
Rolling Stone	The 50 Best Albums of 2021	29	
Rolling Stone	The 20 Best Hip-Hop Albums of 2021	12	

== Commercial performance ==
Punk debuted at number one on the US Billboard 200 chart, earning 90,000 album-equivalent units (including 12,000 copies in pure album sales) in its first week. This became Thug's third US number one debut on the chart. The album also accumulated a total of 102 million on-demand streams of the album's songs. In its second week, the album dropped to number seven on the chart, earning an additional 34,000 units.

In South Africa, nine songs from the album debuted within the top 100 on The Official Charts South Africa (TOSAC), in the week ending October 28, 2021. This became a new record on the chart.

== Track listing ==
Punk track listing
No.	Title	Writer(s)	Producer(s)	Length
1.	"Die Slow" (with Strick)	Jeffery Williams; Tauren Strickland; Ryan Vojtesak	Charlie Handsome	3:57
2.	"Stressed" (with J. Cole and T-Shyne)	J. Williams; Jermaine Cole; Tafa Peters; Tyler Williams; Thomas Lumpkins; Kelvin Wooten; Zairyus Jackson	T-Minus; Tommy Parker; Wu10; Kacey Khaliel	3:40
3.	"Stupid/Asking"	J. Williams; Leland Wayne; Vojtesak; Taurus Currie, Jr.; Benjamin Ibrahimovic; Crater; Alexander Izquierdo; Rocky Block	Metro Boomin; Charlie Handsome; Taurus; Yo Benji; Crater	5:33
4.	"Recognize Real" (with Gunna)	J. Williams; Sergio Kitchens; Vojtesak	Charlie Handsome	2:51
5.	"Contagious"	J. Williams; Ozan Yildirim; Jacob Reske	Oz; Reske	2:30
6.	"Peepin Out the Window" (with Future and BSlime)	J. Williams; Nayvadius Wilburn; Jaborious Grier; Baby Plugg; Ayo Deni; Jordan Edon	Baby Plugg; Ayo Deni; Don	3:57
7.	"Rich Nigga Shit" (with Juice Wrld)	J. Williams; Jarad Higgins; Kanye West; Jordan Jenks	West; Pi'erre Bourne	2:57
8.	"Livin It Up" (with Post Malone and ASAP Rocky)	J. Williams; Austin Post; Rakim Mayers; Vojtesak	Charlie Handsome; ASAP Rocky	3:30
9.	"Yea Yea Yea"	J. Williams; Wesley Glass; Vojtesak; Masamune Kudo; Christopher Miller	Wheezy; Charlie Handsome; Rex Kudo; Hitmaka Millz	2:24
10.	"Insure My Wrist" (with Gunna)	J. Williams; Kitchens; Currie; DecayOnTheBeat; Alec	Taurus; DecayOnTheBeat; Alec	2:48
11.	"Scoliosis" (with Lil Double 0)	J. Williams; Tyreke Rogers; Konstatinos Latos; Zachary Mullett	Nuki; Kuttabeatz	2:50
12.	"Bubbly" (with Drake and Travis Scott)	J. Williams; Aubrey Graham; Jacques Webster II; Glass; Ronald LaTour, Jr.; Dylan Cleary-Krell; Daveon Jackson; Johnny Juliano; Ciaran Mullan	Wheezy; Cardo; Dez Wright; Yung Exclusive; Juliano; Mu Lean	2:45
13.	"Road Rage"	J. Williams; Currie; Ismo Kari	Taurus; Smo	2:32
14.	"Faces"	J. Williams; Glass; Sean Momberger; Leigh Elliott	Wheezy; Momberger; Lee Major	2:12
15.	"Droppin Jewels"	J. Williams; Chandler Durham; Andrew Franklin; K-Notes; Matthew Charles	Turbo; Pro Logic; K-Notes; Ghetto Guitar	3:38
16.	"Fifth Day Dead"	J. Williams; Louis Bell; Andrew Wotman	Bell; Watt	2:30
17.	"Icy Hot" (with Doja Cat)	J. Williams; Amala Dlamini; Glass	Wheezy	3:36
18.	"Love You More" (with Nate Ruess, Gunna, and Jeff Bhasker)	J. Williams; Nathaniel Ruess; Kitchens; Jeff Bhasker; Wayne	Ruess; Bhasker; Metro Boomin	3:41
19.	"Hate the Game"	J. Williams; Bell; Wotman	Bell; Watt	2:44
20.	"Day Before" (with Mac Miller)	J. Williams; Malcolm McCormick; Zach Farache; Donte Perkins	Verzache; TaeBeast	2:15
Total length:				62:50

== Charts ==
=== Weekly charts ===
Weekly chart performance for Punk
Chart (2021)	Peak position
Australian Albums (ARIA)	26
Austrian Albums (Ö3 Austria)	17
Belgian Albums (Ultratop Flanders)	29
Belgian Albums (Ultratop Wallonia)	47
Canadian Albums (Billboard)	3
Danish Albums (Hitlisten)	21
Dutch Albums (Album Top 100)	18
French Albums (SNEP)	37
German Albums (Offizielle Top 100)	55
Irish Albums (Official Charts)	38
Italian Albums (FIMI)	47
Lithuanian Albums (AGATA)	25
New Zealand Albums (RMNZ)	15
Norwegian Albums (VG-lista)	11
Spanish Albums (Promusicae)	92
Swedish Albums (Sverigetopplistan)	41
Swiss Albums (Schweizer Hitparade)	10
UK Albums (Official Charts)	22
UK R&B Albums (Official Charts)	40
US Billboard 200	1
US Top R&B/Hip-Hop Albums (Billboard)	1

=== Year-end charts ===
Year-end chart performance for Punk
Chart (2021)	Position
US Top R&B/Hip-Hop Albums (Billboard)	78
