= Honest (Justin Bieber song) =

Single by Justin Bieber featuring Don Toliver
- Released: April 29, 2022
- Genre: R&B; hip hop
- Length: 3:13
- Label: Def Jam
- Songwriters: Justin Bieber; Caleb Toliver; Tyshane Thompson; Sony de Sousa Ramos; Azul Wynter; Donny Flores; Simon Plummer; Alecia Gibson
- Producers: Beam; Sonni; Wynter

Justin Bieber singles chronology
"Up at Night" (2022)	"Honest" (2022)	"Private Landing" (2023)

Don Toliver singles chronology
"Flocky Flocky" (2021)	"Honest" (2022)	"Scrape It Off" (2022)

Music video
- "Honest" on YouTube

"Honest" is a song by Canadian singer Justin Bieber featuring American rapper and singer Don Toliver. It was released as a single through Def Jam Recordings on April 29, 2022. The song was written alongside Donny Flores, Simon Plummer, Alecia Gibson, and producers Beam, Sonni, and Azul Wynter. It marks the second collaboration between the two artists, following their 2021 joint collaborative single with American record producer Skrillex titled "Don't Go".

== Background ==
"Honest" serves as Bieber's first official single since "Ghost" from his sixth studio album, Justice (2021), although he had released a few collaborations with other artists that were all singles after that. In an interview with SiriusXM, Bieber said that he was trying to make something more lighter and upbeat as "Ghost" sees him singing about the death of a loved one and other sensitive topics, adding that he could connect with the drum patterns of the song as he plays the drums. On May 3, 2022, Bieber was interviewed by Ebro Darden from Apple Music. Bieber discussed Jamaican-American rapper and singer Beam's involvement in the production and songwriting of "Honest", in which he said that Beam "helped write this song and yeah, once again, his little pockets are crazy and I love experimenting with new pockets, new rhythms", specifically because "I'm a drummer, so for me being able to experiment with those little pockets is it's fun". About Toliver, Bieber admitted that "I just love his melodies these are honestly insane. He has a really amazing cadence to his songs and his music. And I'm just a genuine fan. He's very unique."

== Music video ==
The official music video for "Honest", directed by Cole Bennett of Lyrical Lemonade, premiered on Lyrical Lemonade's YouTube channel alongside the song on April 29, 2022. It has a winter vibe to it and sees Bieber and Toliver riding on jet skis.

=== Plot ===
As the video for "Honest" begins, Bieber sports an orange ski mask, which only shows his eyes and mouth uncovered. He then appears in a ski lodge, now dressed up in all-white winter clothing, watching the snow fall out through the window. Toliver later joins Bieber and the two artists ride through the woods in snowmobiles. Bieber and Toliver sit around a fireplace with loved ones, but as enemies show up, the duo grab guns and start shooting at them.

=== "I Feel Funny" music video ===
Bieber and Bennett shot the music video for the former's single, "I Feel Funny", which was released two days before the song and video for "Honest". They worked on the visuals for "I Feel Funny" when Bieber was goofing off in between different sets while shooting the visuals for "Honest", with the intention to make a silly comedy song and video to promote "Honest". Bennett added that "Justin randomly texted me this song one day and said 'should we do a visual to this? song straight to number 1.' We joked around about doing a video for it but never did. A few weeks later we were doing a pick up day for a video we had recently shot, but never finished (Honest). We had a bit of time switching over from scene to scene. So, I went into his trailer and said 'Remember that song you sent me? Let's shoot a video for it on my phone in between takes of the actual video.'"

== Charts ==
Chart performance for "Honest"
Chart (2022)	Peak position
Australia (ARIA)	28
Canada (Canadian Hot 100)	21
Canada CHR/Top 40 (Billboard)	25
Canada Hot AC (Billboard)	44
France (SNEP)	183
Germany (GfK)	98
Global 200 (Billboard)	24
Greece International (IFPI)	42
Ireland (IRMA)	36
Japan Hot Overseas (Billboard)	19
Lithuania (AGATA)	58
Netherlands (Single Tip)	2
New Zealand Hot Singles (RMNZ)	4
Portugal (AFP)	78
South Africa Streaming (TOSAC)	84
Sweden Heatseeker (Sverigetopplistan)	15
Switzerland (Schweizer Hitparade)	54
UK Singles (OCC)	54
US Billboard Hot 100	44
US Pop Airplay (Billboard)	31
US Rhythmic Airplay (Billboard)	6
Vietnam (Vietnam Hot 100)	44

== Certifications ==
Certifications for "Honest"
Region	Certification	Certified units/sales
Brazil (Pro-Música Brasil)	Platinum	40,000^{‡}
^{‡} Sales+streaming figures based on certification alone.

== Release history ==
Release history for "Honest"
Region	Date	Format(s)	Label(s)	Ref.
Various	April 29, 2022	Digital download; streaming	Def Jam	
Italy	April 29, 2022	Radio airplay	UMG	
United States	May 17, 2022	Urban radio	Def Jam; UMG	
