= TisaKorean =

American rapper

- Born: Domonic Patten; Houston, Texas, U.S.
- Genres: Dance rap, Snap music
- Occupations: Rapper; record producer; dancer
- Instrument: Vocals
- Years active: 2017–present
- Label: Nice Life

Domonic Patten, known professionally as TisaKorean, is an American rapper, record producer, and dancer. He released his breakout single, "Dip", in 2018.

== Early life ==
Domonic Patten was born in Southwest Houston, Texas. In middle school, he moved to Missouri City, Texas. Throughout high school, which TisaKorean has called "the most crazy [sic] moment of my life", he DJed at parties and was voted "best dressed" by his classmates in his senior year. He attended Prairie View A&M University as a nursing student with intentions of DJing more. His grades suffered due to his frequent partying and he dropped out by his freshman year. Soon after, he learned how to produce music on Logic Pro, and would send beats of his to friends, most of whom turned them down.

== Career ==
TisaKorean released his debut mixtape, Stupid Dumb Geek, in 2017. He released his breakout single, "Dip", in 2018, which went viral on Instagram and other social media platforms and was later released through Atlantic Records. He released his second mixtape, A Guide to Being a Partying Freshman, in March 2019, and a second mixtape, Soapy Club, in July 2019. In May 2019, he was featured on Chance the Rapper's single "Groceries". Also in 2019, he released his single "The Mop". His album, Wasteland, containing his single "The Mop", was released on December 4, 2020 through Ultra Records via Sony Music and signed by A&R Leigha Healy. In October 2021, he released his single "Silly Dude". TisaKorean's mixtape, Mr. Sillyflow, was also released in October 2021.

== Artistry ==
TisaKorean's music has been described as dance rap. He primarily uses Logic Pro to produce his music, which he does at his mother's house. He has stated that he is mostly inspired by Pharrell Williams, also comparing his own beats to those of Soulja Boy. Ben Dandridge-Lemco of The Fader described TisaKorean's beats as "sparse and dissonant".

== Discography ==
=== Singles ===
==== As lead artist ====
List of singles as lead artist with title, year, and album
Title	Year	Album
"Werkkk"	2018	Non-album singles
"Tryna Beat"	2018	Non-album singles
"Willowridge"	2018	Non-album singles
"Dip"	2018	Non-album singles
"Brush My Teeth"	2018	Non-album singles
"Rock Climbing Swag"	2018	Non-album singles
"Gabby"	2018	Non-album singles
"Watch Out"	2019	Non-album singles
"Double Dare (Soapy Anthem)"	2019	Soapy Club
"Spongy"	2019	Soapy Club
"Aero (Blow the Whistle)"	2019	Non-album single
"The Mop" (solo or featuring Kblast and Huncho Da Rockstar)	2020	Wasteland
"Wurk"	2020	Non-album single
"Bate Onna Bo"	2020	Wasteland
"iPhone Update"	2020	Non-album singles
"iRock (Sippin on Dat Ciroc)" (with Kblast)	2020	Wasteland
"Rocky Road" (featuring Father and YehMe2)	2020	Wasteland
"Did You Know (Wifi Password)"	2020	Wasteland
"Gabby (Remix)" (with Vino24k)	2020	Non-album singles
"Drift" (featuring Mighty Bay and Number9ok)	2021	Non-album singles
"Watermelon Hero"	2021	Mr. Sillyflow
"Dirty Laundry"	2021	Non-album single
"Why Would I" (featuring Fancy)	2021	Non-album single
"Housetop (Shake Dat)"	2021	Non-album single
"Roll Ya Boat" (with Voochie P)	2022	Non-album single
"Silly Rabbit Remix"	2022	Non-album single
"So Silly (Remix)" (with Koto.)	2022	Non-album single
"Jazzzy Black" (with Hurrxcane)	2022	Non-album single
"Tahoe"	2022	Non-album single
"Pasta" (with Mighty Bay)	2022	Non-album single
"Shawty Wassup 2.0" (with Yung Nation)	2022	Non-album single
"Baggy"	2022	Non-album single
"Static" (featuring Sprite from McDonald's)	2022	Non-album single
"Bagel Chips"	2022	Non-album single
"Foolie Dee"	2022	Non-album single
"Rando"	2023	Non-album single
"1500 Shawty"	2023	Non-album single

==== As featured artist ====
List of singles as featured artist with title, year, chart positions, and album
Title	Year	Peak chart positions	Album
Title	Year	US Bub.	Album
"Get Down on That Flo" (The Outfit, TX featuring TisaKorean)	2018	—	Non-album singles
"Groceries" (Chance the Rapper featuring TisaKorean and Murda Beatz)	2019	9	Non-album singles
"Jason X" (Number9ok featuring TisaKorean and Ugly God)	2019	—	Death at a Party
"Sun's Out, Buns Out" (Lex Andretti featuring TisaKorean and Tadoe)	2019	—	Non-album singles
"Let Go My Eggo" (Iamlilnacho featuring TisaKorean and Mighty Bay)	2019	—	Non-album singles
"At The Door" (ZaeHD & CEO featuring TisaKorean)	2020	—	Non-album singles
"Less Talk Run It Up" (Mighty Bay featuring TisaKorean)	2020	—	Non-album singles
"Just Water" (Bryansanon featuring TisaKorean)	2021	—	Non-album singles
"Noticed It!" (Autumn! featuring TisaKorean)	2021	—	Non-album singles
"So Hot" (Outlaw Mel and The Outfit, TX featuring TisaKorean)	2021	—	Non-album singles
"Stomp Em Out" (Yoshi the Plug featuring TisaKorean)	2021	—	Non-album singles
"Go Down" (Don Toliver featuring TisaKorean)	2023	—	Love Sick
