= Life of a Don =

Studio album by Don Toliver
- Released: October 8, 2021
- Recorded: 2020–2021
- Genres: Hip-hop; R&B
- Length: 51:30
- Labels: We Run It; Cactus Jack; Atlantic
- Producers: 1Mind; Allen Ritter; Baby Keem; Blair Taylor; Broadday; Bryvn; Cardo; Chase B; Corbett; David x Eli; Dez Wright; DJ Dahi; FKi 1st; Fabefocused; Frankie XY; Go Grizzly; Hit-Boy; Jahaan Sweet; London Cyr; Los Hendrix; the Loud Pack; Mario Winans; Metro Boomin; Mike Dean; Moonraccoon; Motif Alumni; Mustard; Mirela; Mu Lean; Omar Grand; Oracles; Pas Beatz; Peter Lee Johnson; Saint Mino; Sam-E Lee Jones; Sonny Digital; Sir Dylan; Sool Got Hits; Travis Scott

Don Toliver chronology
Heaven or Hell (2020)	Life of a Don (2021)	Love Sick (2023)

Singles from Life of a Don
- 1. "What You Need" Released: May 4, 2021; 2. "Drugs n Hella Melodies" Released: June 18, 2021; 3. "Way Bigger" Released: October 8, 2021; 4. "Flocky Flocky" Released: October 11, 2021

Life of a Don (also abbreviated to L.O.A.D.) is the second studio album by American rapper and singer Don Toliver. It was released on October 8, 2021, through Cactus Jack Records, Atlantic Records, and We Run It Entertainment. The production on the album was handled by multiple producers, including Mike Dean, Mustard, Metro Boomin, Allen Ritter, Hit-Boy, Cardo, and Sonny Digital, among others. The album also features guest appearances from Travis Scott, Kali Uchis, Baby Keem, HVN, and SoFaygo.

Life of a Don was preceded by two singles: "What You Need" and "Drugs n Hella Melodies", followed by "Way Bigger" and "Flocky Flocky" after the album's release. The album received generally positive reviews from music critics and was a commercial success. It debuted at number two on the US Billboard 200 chart, earning 68,000 album-equivalent units in its first week.

== Release and promotion ==
On February 2, 2021, Don Toliver cryptically announced Life of a Don via Twitter. Toliver's Cactus Jack Records label boss, American rapper and singer Travis Scott, teased his excitement and involvement in the album in a tweet on April 9. Toliver had previously planned to release the album in July 2021. On September 28, Toliver announced the release date of the album and revealed its cover art a few hours later. He also teased the opening track, "Xscape", in a trailer video of the album. To support the album, Toliver went on tour with American rapper Bia, serving as a special guest.

=== Singles ===
Two singles preceded the release of the album. The lead single, "What You Need", was released on May 4, 2021. The second single, "Drugs n Hella Melodies", featuring Toliver's girlfriend, Colombian-American singer Kali Uchis, was released on June 18, 2021. Both music videos were filmed in Colombia and released alongside the songs on their respective release dates. The songs "Way Bigger" and "Flocky Flocky", released October 8 and 11 respectively, were released as singles alongside music videos after the album's release.

== Critical reception ==
Professional ratings
Aggregate scores
Source	Rating
Metacritic	72/100
Review scores
Source	Rating
AllMusic	3.5/5 stars
Clash	8/10
HipHopDX	3.2/5
NME	4/5 stars
Pitchfork	7.2/10
Rolling Stone	3/5 stars

According to the review aggregator Metacritic, Life of a Don received "generally favorable reviews" based on a weighted average score of 72 out of 100 from 6 critic scores.

== Commercial performance ==
Life of a Don debuted at number two on the US Billboard 200 chart, earning 68,000 album-equivalent units, (including 18,000 copies in pure album sales) in its first week. This became Toliver's second US top-ten debut on the chart and highest-charting album until Octane, which released in 2026, debuting at number one. The album also accumulated a total of 64.13 million on-demand streams from the album's songs.

== Track listing ==
Life of a Don track listing
No.	Title	Writer(s)	Producer(s)	Length
1.	"Xscape"	Caleb Toliver; Chase Benjamin; Michael Dean; Shivam Barot; Patrick Rosario; Simon Kirechely; Douglas Ford	Chase B; Mike Dean; the Loud Pack; Mirela	2:36
2.	"5x"	Toliver; Ronald LaTour Jr.; Mino Drerup; Ford	Cardo; Saint Mino	2:12
3.	"Way Bigger"	Toliver; Sonny Uwaezuoke; Bryan Yepes; Francisco Bejar; Dylan Wiggins	Sonny Digital; Bryvn; Frankie XY; Sir Dylan	3:16
4.	"Flocky Flocky" (featuring Travis Scott)	Toliver; Jacques Webster II; LaTour; Dylan Cleary-Krell; Ciaran Mullan	Cardo; Dez Wright; Mu Lean	3:03
5.	"What You Need"	Toliver; Chauncey Hollis Jr.; Dustin Corbett; Wiggins	Hit-Boy; Corbett; Sir Dylan	3:38
6.	"Double Standards"	Toliver; Kevin Price; Rasool Diaz; Dean; Wiggins; Fabian Johnson; Jocelyn Donald	Go Grizzly; Sool Got Hits; Dean; Sir Dylan; Fabefocused	3:11
7.	"Swangin' on Westheimer"	Toliver; Leland Wayne; Peter Lee Johnson; Mario Winans	Metro Boomin; Johnson; Winans	4:48
8.	"Drugs n Hella Melodies" (featuring Kali Uchis)	Toliver; Karly-Marina Loaiza; Dacoury Natche; Carlos Muñoz; Wiggins	DJ Dahi; Loshendrix; Sir Dylan	3:19
9.	"2AM"	Toliver; Jahaan Sweet	Sweet	2:45
10.	"Get Throwed"	Toliver; Dijon McFarlane; Omar Perrin	Mustard; Omar Grand	2:35
11.	"Company, Pt 2"	Toliver; Wayne; David Ruoff; Elias Klughammer; Josh Gottmanns; Dennis Jüngel	Metro Boomin; David x Eli; Oracles	3:31
12.	"Outerspace" (featuring Baby Keem)	Toliver; Hykeem Carter Jr.; Cleary-Krell; James Cyr; Dean; Sweet; Linda Kopera	Baby Keem; Dez Wright; London Cyr; Dean; Sweet; Moonraccoon	3:46
13.	"Smoke" (featuring HVN and SoFaygo)	Toliver; Giovon Edwards; Andre Burt Jr.; Sebastian Lopez; Duprie Monroe; Samm Niingungo	1Mind; Broadday; Sam-E Lee Jones	3:19
14.	"You" (featuring Travis Scott)	Toliver; Webster; Allen Ritter; Dean	Ritter; Dean; Travis Scott	3:33
15.	"Crossfaded"	Toliver; Trocon Roberts Jr.; Dean; Blair Lavigne	FKi 1st; Dean; Blair Taylor	2:39
16.	"Bogus"	Toliver; LaTour; Marcus Rucker; Pascal Leroy	Cardo; Motif Alumni; Pas Beatz	3:19
Total length:				51:30

Notes

- "Xscape", "Outerspace", and "Bogus" are stylized in all caps.

== Charts ==
=== Weekly charts ===
Weekly chart performance for Life of a Don
Chart (2021)	Peak position
Australian Albums (ARIA)	17
Belgian Albums (Ultratop Flanders)	21
Belgian Albums (Ultratop Wallonia)	16
Canadian Albums (Billboard)	6
Danish Albums (Hitlisten)	13
Dutch Albums (Album Top 100)	16
Finnish Albums (Suomen virallinen lista)	40
German Albums (Offizielle Top 100)	32
Irish Albums (Official Charts)	29
Italian Albums (FIMI)	53
Lithuanian Albums (AGATA)	10
New Zealand Albums (RMNZ)	13
Norwegian Albums (VG-lista)	9
Spanish Albums (PROMUSICAE)	77
Swedish Albums (Sverigetopplistan)	46
Swiss Albums (Schweizer Hitparade)	3
UK Albums (Official Charts)	26
US Billboard 200	2
US Top R&B/Hip-Hop Albums (Billboard)	2

=== Year-end charts ===
Year-end chart performance for Life of a Don
Chart (2021)	Position
US Top R&B/Hip-Hop Albums (Billboard)	82

== Certifications ==
Certifications for Life of a Don
Region	Certification	Certified units/sales
New Zealand (RMNZ)	Gold	7,500^{‡}
^{‡} Sales+streaming figures based on certification alone.
