= Hold That Heat =

2022 single by Southside and Future featuring Travis Scott

Single by Southside and Future featuring Travis Scott
- Released: April 22, 2022
- Genre: Trap
- Length: 3:41
- Label: Epic
- Songwriters: Joshua Luellen; Nayvadius Wilburn; Jacques Webster II; Mike Dean
- Producers: Southside; Dean

Southside singles chronology
"Stay with Me" (2022)	"Hold That Heat" (2022)	"Save Me" (2022)

Future singles chronology
"Worst Day" (2022)	"Hold That Heat" (2022)	"Wait for U" (2022)

Travis Scott singles chronology
"Escape Plan" / "Mafia" (2021)	"Hold That Heat" (2022)	"Never Sleep" (2022)

Music video
- "Hold That Heat" on YouTube

"Hold That Heat" is a song by American record producer Southside and American rapper Future featuring fellow American rapper Travis Scott. It was released on April 22, 2022 with an accompanying music video. The song was written by the artists alongside Mike Dean, who produced it with Southside.

== Background ==
Southside and Travis Scott created the song about eight months before it was released. Months later, Scott recruited Future on the track.

"Hold That Heat" is the first song that Scott has released since the Astroworld Festival crowd crush in November 2021.

== Composition ==
The song features a trap beat. Both rappers perform the hook in a repetitive style as well as "lengthy verses". Scott performs the opening verse, celebrating his success as a rapper, while Future sings the closing verse.

== Music video ==
The music video was directed by Philip Andelman. It opens with Southside smoking marijuana and staring at himself in a mirror, and takes place in a dark motel filled with flashing lasers. Travis Scott walks a domesticated crocodile with a chain leash as he raps, while Future performs his verse in a red room. The rappers are accompanied by a stripper dancing on a pole.

== Charts ==
Chart performance for "Hold That Heat"
Chart (2022)	Peak position
Canada Hot 100 (Billboard)	43
Global 200 (Billboard)	73
New Zealand Hot Singles (RMNZ)	9
South Africa (RISA)	82
US Billboard Hot 100	57
US Hot R&B/Hip-Hop Songs (Billboard)	16
US Rhythmic Airplay (Billboard)	30
