= Flocky Flocky =

2021 song by Don Toliver featuring Travis Scott

Single by Don Toliver featuring Travis Scott

from the album Life of a Don
- Released: October 11, 2021
- Recorded: 2020
- Genre: Trap
- Length: 3:03
- Label: We Run It; Cactus Jack; 300
- Songwriters: Caleb Toliver; Jacques Webster; Ronald LaTour Jr.; Dylan Cleary-Krell; Ciaran Mullan
- Producers: Cardo; Dez Wright; Mu Lean

Don Toliver singles chronology
"Way Bigger" (2021)	"Flocky Flocky" (2021)	"Honest" (2022)

Travis Scott singles chronology
"Durag Activity" (2021)	"Flocky Flocky" (2021)	"Bubbly" (2021)

Music video
- "Flocky Flocky" on YouTube

"Flocky Flocky" is a song by American rapper Don Toliver, released on October 8, 2021 from his second studio album Life of a Don and released as a single with a music video on October 11, 2021. It features American rapper Travis Scott. The song was produced by Cardo, Dez Wright and Mu Lean.

== Background ==
A snippet of the song surfaced online in October 2020.

Following the release of Life of a Don, Don Toliver told Ebro Darden on Apple Music 1:

"Flocky Flocky" was one regular studio recording day I had and [Travis Scott] randomly […] came to my session and just pulled up on me. I already had that record, I just did that record before he walked in. He pulled up and instantly laid his verse down. I was just happy man, I was just happy he pulled up to the session, period. Seeing him get on the mic and doing that verse was exciting.

In December 2021, Mu Lean released a video in which he walks through the production process of the song.

== Composition ==
The song focuses on the rappers' "rockstar lifestyle" which includes drug usage, and is performed with vocals in Auto-Tune.

== Critical reception ==
Aron A. of HotNewHipHop called the song a "trancey banger", while Robin Murray of Clash called it "an addictive Travis Scott burner". Kyann-Sian Williams of NME gave a negative review, commenting that "the duo court that moody sound but also add the tinny melodies popular in pop-rap nowadays. It feels chaotic and rushed, never mind Travis Scott's mostly nonsensical lines: 'I keep a place to bait, to tune your brain up / She stuffs her face in cake, no way it's safe'."

== Music video ==
An official music video was released on October 11, 2021. Shot through fisheye lens with grainy, night vision-like footage, it starts with the rappers racing in their Lamborghinis on a highway at night, before fueling up and boarding a private jet to New Orleans. They hang out in the studio, dine on wings and throw money at a strip club, visit a mural of Lil Wayne in his neighborhood of Hollygrove and ride in a limousine.

== Charts ==
Chart performance for "Flocky Flocky"
Chart (2021)	Peak position
Canada Hot 100 (Billboard)	44
France (SNEP)	174
Global 200 (Billboard)	46
Ireland (IRMA)	99
New Zealand Hot Singles (RMNZ)	5
UK Singles (OCC)	99
US Billboard Hot 100	53
US Hot R&B/Hip-Hop Songs (Billboard)	15

== Certifications ==
Certifications for "Flocky Flocky"
Region	Certification	Certified units/sales
Canada (Music Canada)	Gold	40,000^{‡}
^{‡} Sales+streaming figures based on certification alone.
