= Bubbly (Young Thug, Drake and Travis Scott song) =

2021 single by Young Thug, Drake, and Travis Scott

Single by Young Thug, Drake and Travis Scott

from the album Punk
- Released: November 2, 2021
- Genre: Trap
- Length: 2:45
- Label: YSL; 300
- Songwriters: Jeffery Williams; Aubrey Graham; Jacques Webster II; Wesley Glass; Ronald LaTour, Jr.; Dylan Cleary-Krell; Daveon Jackson; Johnny Juliano; Ciaran Mullan
- Producers: Wheezy; Cardo; Kela; Yung Exclusive; Johnny Juliano; Mu Lean

Young Thug singles chronology
"Private Phones" (2021)	"Bubbly" (2021)	"Potion" (2022)

Drake singles chronology
"Girls Want Girls" (2021)	"Bubbly" (2021)	"Knife Talk" (2021)

Travis Scott singles chronology
"Flocky Flocky" (2021)	"Bubbly" (2021)	"Escape Plan" / "Mafia" (2021)

Lyric video
- "Bubbly" on YouTube

"Bubbly" is a song by American rappers Young Thug and Travis Scott and Canadian rapper Drake. It was sent to US rhythmic radio through YSL Records and 300 Entertainment as the lead and only single from the former's second studio album, Punk, on November 2, 2021. The three artists wrote the song with producers Wheezy, Cardo, Dez Wright, Yung Exclusive, Johnny Juliano, and Mu Lean.

== Background ==
On October 20, 2021, American rapper Lil Baby posted a video on TikTok, in which he revealed that he was supposed to be on the song and previewed his verse, but claimed that he forgot to send it to Young Thug.

== Composition and lyrics ==
On the song, Young Thug, Travis Scott, and Drake go in order verse-to-verse. The former starts off the song, boasting about his expensive clothing and jewelry and about women. Travis Scott then comes in, rapping about the same thing. The beat switches as Drake slows down and finishes off the song by continuing with the theme.

== Critical reception ==
Erika Marie from HotNewHipHop felt that "this trio makes perfect sense as they are three leading moguls in the Rap industry with their own labels, clothing lines, and partnerships". Sarah Osei of Highsnobiety placed "Bubbly" at the top of her 60 Songs of the Week chart, claiming the song proves that Young Thug is a "rockstar" as he "drops delirious bars about the dark and twisted realities of fame".

== Charts ==
Chart performance for "Bubbly"
Chart (2021)	Peak position
Australia (ARIA)	88
Canada Hot 100 (Billboard)	22
Global 200 (Billboard)	25
Ireland (IRMA)	64
New Zealand Hot Singles (RMNZ)	5
Portugal (AFP)	148
South Africa (RISA)	19
Switzerland (Schweizer Hitparade)	94
UK Singles (Official Charts)	60
UK Indie (Official Charts)	19
UK Hip Hop/R&B (Official Charts)	20
US Billboard Hot 100	20
US Hot R&B/Hip-Hop Songs (Billboard)	7
US Rhythmic Airplay (Billboard)	24
