= Private Landing =

2023 single by Don Toliver featuring Justin Bieber and Future

Single by Don Toliver featuring Justin Bieber and Future

from the album Love Sick
- Released: March 14, 2023
- Length: 3:58
- Label: Cactus Jack; Atlantic
- Songwriters: Caleb Toliver; Justin Bieber; Nayvadius Wilburn; Rob Bisel; Ronald LaTour, Jr.; Omar Guetfa; Derek Anderson
- Producers: Bisel; Cardo; Guetfa; 206Derek

Don Toliver singles chronology
"Leave the Club" (2023)	"Private Landing" (2023)	"Soweto" (2023)

Justin Bieber singles chronology
"Honest" (2022)	"Private Landing" (2023)	"Snooze" (Acoustic) (2023)

Future singles chronology
"Mbappé" (Remix) (2023)	"Private Landing" (2023)	"Transformer" (2023)

Visualizer video
- "Private Landing" on YouTube

"Private Landing" is a song by American rapper and singer Don Toliver featuring Canadian singer Justin Bieber and fellow American rapper Future. It was sent to rhythmic contemporary radio through Cactus Jack and Atlantic Records as the fourth single from Toliver's third studio album, Love Sick, on March 14, 2023. The three artists wrote the song with producers Rob Bisel, Cardo, Omar Guetfa, and 206Derek.

== Composition ==
The song begins with Don Toliver performing the chorus and first verse, with lyrics about "poppin' at the Ritz" and being in bed with a "super soaker". He is followed by Future's verse, while Justin Bieber performs the bridge and last verse.

== Critical reception ==
Clayton Purdom of Rolling Stone regarded the song as a track from Love Sick that "follow[s] the template perfectly". Hayley Hynes of HotNewHipHop praised Justin Bieber's feature, writing that "he mostly shows off his coveted vocal skills on the bridge with Toliver before reminding listeners that he's got some rap skills in his arsenal as well".

== Visualizer ==
A visualizer of the song was released alongside Love Sick. It sees a special package being delivered to a restaurant where a beautiful woman is putting away stacks of cash, with two armed guards standing by, while the chef is cooking.

== Charts ==
=== Weekly charts ===
Weekly chart performance for "Private Landing"
Chart (2023)	Peak position
Canada Hot 100 (Billboard)	58
Global 200 (Billboard)	115
Ireland (IRMA)	78
Netherlands (Single Tip)	29
New Zealand Hot Singles (RMNZ)	9
Portugal (AFP)	178
UK Singles (Official Charts)	74
US Billboard Hot 100	72
US Hot R&B/Hip-Hop Songs (Billboard)	24
US Rhythmic Airplay (Billboard)	8

=== Year-end charts ===
Year-end chart performance for "Private Landing"
Chart (2023)	Position
US Hot R&B/Hip-Hop Songs (Billboard)	68
US Rhythmic (Billboard)	41

== Certifications ==
Certifications for "Private Landing"
Region	Certification	Certified units/sales
Canada (Music Canada)	2× Platinum	160,000^{‡}
New Zealand (RMNZ)	Platinum	30,000^{‡}
Poland (ZPAV)	Gold	25,000^{‡}
United Kingdom (BPI)	Silver	200,000^{‡}
United States (RIAA)	Platinum	1,000,000^{‡}
^{‡} Sales+streaming figures based on certification alone.
