= Heaven or Hell (album) =

Studio album by Don Toliver
- Released: March 13, 2020
- Recorded: 2018–2019
- Studio: Cactus (Honolulu, Hawaii)
- Genre: Hip-hop; R&B; trap
- Length: 36:30
- Label: We Run It; Cactus Jack; Atlantic
- Producer: Cash Passion; Cássio; Cvre; Cubeatz; El Michels; Frank Dukes; Forthenight; Freakey; Mido; Mike Dean; Nils; Nkenge 1x; Sonic Major; Sonny Digital; TM88; Travis Scott; WondaGurl

Don Toliver chronology
Donny Womack (2018)	Heaven or Hell (2020)	Life of a Don (2021)

Singles from Heaven or Hell
- 1. "No Idea" Released: May 29, 2019; 2. "Can't Feel My Legs" Released: December 13, 2019; 3. "Had Enough" Released: December 27, 2019; 4. "After Party" Released: June 23, 2020

Heaven or Hell is the debut studio album by American rapper and singer Don Toliver. It was released through Cactus Jack, Atlantic Records and We Run It Entertainment on March 13, 2020. The album features guest appearances from Travis Scott, Kaash Paige, Quavo and Offset from the now-defunct hip-hop trio Migos and Sheck Wes. Production was handled by Travis Scott himself, WondaGurl, Mike Dean, Sonic Major, Sonny Digital, Frank Dukes, Cvre, Mido Cubeatz, Nils, Cássio, Freakey!, Forthenight, Cash Passion, Nkenge 1x, TM88, and El Michels. A remix version of the album subtitled "Chopnotslop" was released on April 17, 2020.

Heaven or Hell was supported by four singles: "No Idea", "Can't Feel My Legs", "Had Enough", and "After Party". The album received generally positive reviews from music critics and was a commercial success. It debuted at number seven on the US Billboard 200 chart, earning 44,000 album-equivalent units in its first week.

== Background ==
In 2018, after guest appearing on Travis Scott's third studio album Astroworld, Toliver signed onto the former's record label Cactus Jack Records, along with Atlantic Records and We Run It Entertainment.

In May 2019, Toliver stated the album's original title as "Resurrection".

In December 2019, Toliver was featured on the Cactus Jack compilation album JackBoys.

On March 10, 2020, Toliver announced Heaven or Hell on social media alongside the album's artwork which was created by illustrator Matthew McCormick.

== Recording ==
In March 2020, American record producer Sonny Digital said on Twitter that he was part of the project, while also confirming songs "Cardigan" and "After Party", both which he co-produced. Other producers include Canadian record producer WondaGurl, who co-produced "Can't Feel My Legs" and American record producer TM88, who co-produced "Had Enough".

== Promotion ==
A snippet of the song "After Party" was previously featured on Scott's Netflix documentary Look Mom I Can Fly, which spread hype around the song. It originally featured a verse from Travis Scott which did not make it to the final version. He later performed a portion of the song at the 2019 Astroworld Festival. Another version of the song, without Scott, was leaked featuring a different beat and outro.

== Singles ==
On May 29, 2019, the album's lead single "No Idea" was released and was accompanied by a music video. On December 13, Toliver released the album's second single "Can't Feel My Legs", which was also accompanied by a music video. On December 27, Toliver released the third single "Had Enough" featuring American rappers Quavo and Offset from the hip-hop trio Migos, which was also on the Cactus Jack compilation album JackBoys, released on the same day, as the second single of that project. On June 23, 2020, "After Party" was released to urban contemporary radio in the United States, making it the fourth single.

== Critical reception ==
Professional ratings
Review scores
Source	Rating
Clash	7/10
HipHopDX	4.2/5
Pitchfork	6.1/10
Rolling Stone	3/5 stars

Heaven or Hell was met with generally positive reviews from music critics.

== Commercial performance ==
Heaven or Hell debuted at number seven on the US Billboard 200 chart, earning 44,000 album-equivalent units (including 3,000 copies as pure album sales) in its first week. This became Toliver's first US top-ten debut on the chart. On February 22, 2023, the album was certified platinum by the Recording Industry Association of America (RIAA) for combined sales and album-equivalent units of over 1,000,000 units in the United States.

== Track listing ==
Heaven or Hell track listing
No.	Title	Writer(s)	Producer(s)	Length
1.	"Heaven or Hell"	Caleb Toliver; Ebony Oshunrinde; Michael Dean	WondaGurl; Mike Dean^{[a]}	3:03
2.	"Euphoria" (featuring Travis Scott and Kaash Paige)	Toliver; Jacques Webster II; D'Kyla Woolen; Oluwatoroti Oke; Dean	Sonic Major; Dean^{[a]}	3:36
3.	"Cardigan"	Toliver; Dean; Sonny Uwaezuoke; Adam Feeney; Jun Ha Kim; Mohamed Elkhalifa	Sonny Digital; Frank Dukes; Cvre^{[a]}; Mido^{[a]}; Dean^{[a]}	2:39
4.	"After Party"	Toliver; Uwaezuoke; Kevin Gomringer; Tim Gomringer; Nils Noehden; Dean; Webster	Sonny Digital; Cubeatz^{[a]}; Nils^{[a]}; Dean^{[a]}; Travis Scott^{[b]}	2:48
5.	"Wasted"	Toliver; Cassio Lopes; Jocelyn Donald; Simon Plummer; Donny Flores	Cássio	2:51
6.	"Can't Feel My Legs"	Toliver; Charles Ocansey; Hans-Michael Dary-Nereus; Oshunrinde; Dean	Forthenight; Freakey; WondaGurl; Dean^{[a]}	3:01
7.	"Candy"	Toliver; Oshunrinde; Dean; Webster	WondaGurl; Dean^{[a]}; Travis Scott^{[b]}; Cash Passion^{[b]}; Nkenge 1x^{[b]}	3:56
8.	"Company"	Toliver; Oshunrinde; Feeney; Dean	WondaGurl; Frank Dukes; Dean^{[a]}; Cash Passion^{[a]}	3:25
9.	"Had Enough" (featuring Quavo and Offset)	Toliver; Quavious Marshall; Kiari Cephus; Dean; Bryan Simmons; Leon Michels	TM88; El Michels; Dean; Cash Passion^{[d]}	2:37
10.	"Spaceship" (featuring Sheck Wes)	Toliver; Khadimou Fall; Uwaezuoke; Feeney; Dean	Sonny Digital; Frank Dukes; Dean^{[a]}	3:05
11.	"No Photos"	Toliver; Oshunrinde; Tim Gomringer; Kevin Gomringer	WondaGurl; Cubeatz^{[a]}	2:55
12.	"No Idea"	Toliver; Oshunrinde; T. Gomringer; K. Gomringer	WondaGurl; Cubeatz^{[a]}	2:34
Total length:				36:30

Notes

- ^{^[a]} signifies a co-producer
- ^{^[b]} signifies an additional producer
- "Heaven or Hell" was originally released as "Heaven or Hell Intro".

== Personnel ==
Musicians

- Nkenge 1x – additional keyboards (track 7)

Technical

- Jimmy Cash – recording (tracks 1, 2, 7), mixing assistant (tracks 1–8, 10, 11), mixing (track 12)
- Travis Scott – recording (track 2)
- Zach Steele – recording (tracks 3, 4, 10)
- Trevor Coulter – recording (tracks 5, 6, 8), engineering (track 9)
- Nate Alford – recording (track 12)
- Colton Eatmon – engineering (track 9)
- Shawn Morenberg – engineering assistant (track 9)
- Sage Skolfield – mixing assistant (tracks 1–8, 10, 11)
- Sean Solymar – mixing assistant (tracks 1–8, 10, 11)
- Mike Dean – mixing (tracks 1–11), mastering (all tracks)

== Charts ==
=== Weekly charts ===
Chart performance for Heaven or Hell
Chart (2020)	Peak position
Australian Albums (ARIA)	20
Austrian Albums (Ö3 Austria)	23
Belgian Albums (Ultratop Flanders)	29
Belgian Albums (Ultratop Wallonia)	44
Canadian Albums (Billboard)	7
Danish Albums (Hitlisten)	20
Dutch Albums (Album Top 100)	31
Finnish Albums (Suomen virallinen lista)	50
French Albums (SNEP)	43
German Albums (Offizielle Top 100)	51
Irish Albums (Official Charts)	23
Italian Albums (FIMI)	62
New Zealand Albums (RMNZ)	14
Norwegian Albums (VG-lista)	7
Swedish Albums (Sverigetopplistan)	39
Swiss Albums (Schweizer Hitparade)	22
UK Albums (Official Charts)	17
US Billboard 200	7
US Top R&B/Hip-Hop Albums (Billboard)	5

Chart (2026)	Peak position
Portuguese Albums (AFP)	196

=== Year-end charts ===
2020 year-end chart performance for Heaven or Hell
Chart (2020)	Position
US Billboard 200	119
US Top R&B/Hip-Hop Albums (Billboard)	56

== Certifications ==
Certifications for Heaven or Hell
Region	Certification	Certified units/sales
Canada (Music Canada)	Platinum	80,000^{‡}
Denmark (IFPI Danmark)	Gold	10,000^{‡}
New Zealand (RMNZ)	Platinum	15,000^{‡}
United Kingdom (BPI)	Silver	60,000^{‡}
United States (RIAA)	Platinum	1,000,000^{‡}
^{‡} Sales+streaming figures based on certification alone.
