= After Party (song) =

Single by Don Toliver

from the album Heaven or Hell
- Released: June 23, 2020
- Genre: Hip-hop
- Length: 2:47
- Label: Cactus Jack; Atlantic; We Run It
- Songwriters: Caleb Toliver; Sonny Uwaezuoke; Kevin Gomringer; Tim Gomringer; Nils Noehden; Michael Dean; Jacques Webster II
- Producers: Sonny Digital; Cubeatz; Nils; Mike Dean; Travis Scott

Don Toliver singles chronology
"De La Hoya" (2020)	"After Party" (2020)	"Cafeteria" (2020)

Music video
- "After Party" on YouTube

"After Party" is a song by American rapper and singer Don Toliver. It was sent to rhythmic contemporary radio through Cactus Jack, Atlantic Records and We Run It Entertainment as the third and final single from his debut studio album, Heaven or Hell, on June 23, 2020. Toliver wrote the song with producer Sonny Digital, producers Tim and Kevin Gomringer from the production duo Cubeatz, producer Nils, co-producer Mike Dean and additional producer Travis Scott. The song gained popularity in mid-2020 after going viral on the social media video platform TikTok after multiple famous users on the app created dances to it and multiple memes were subsequently made about capybaras relating to it.

== Promotion ==
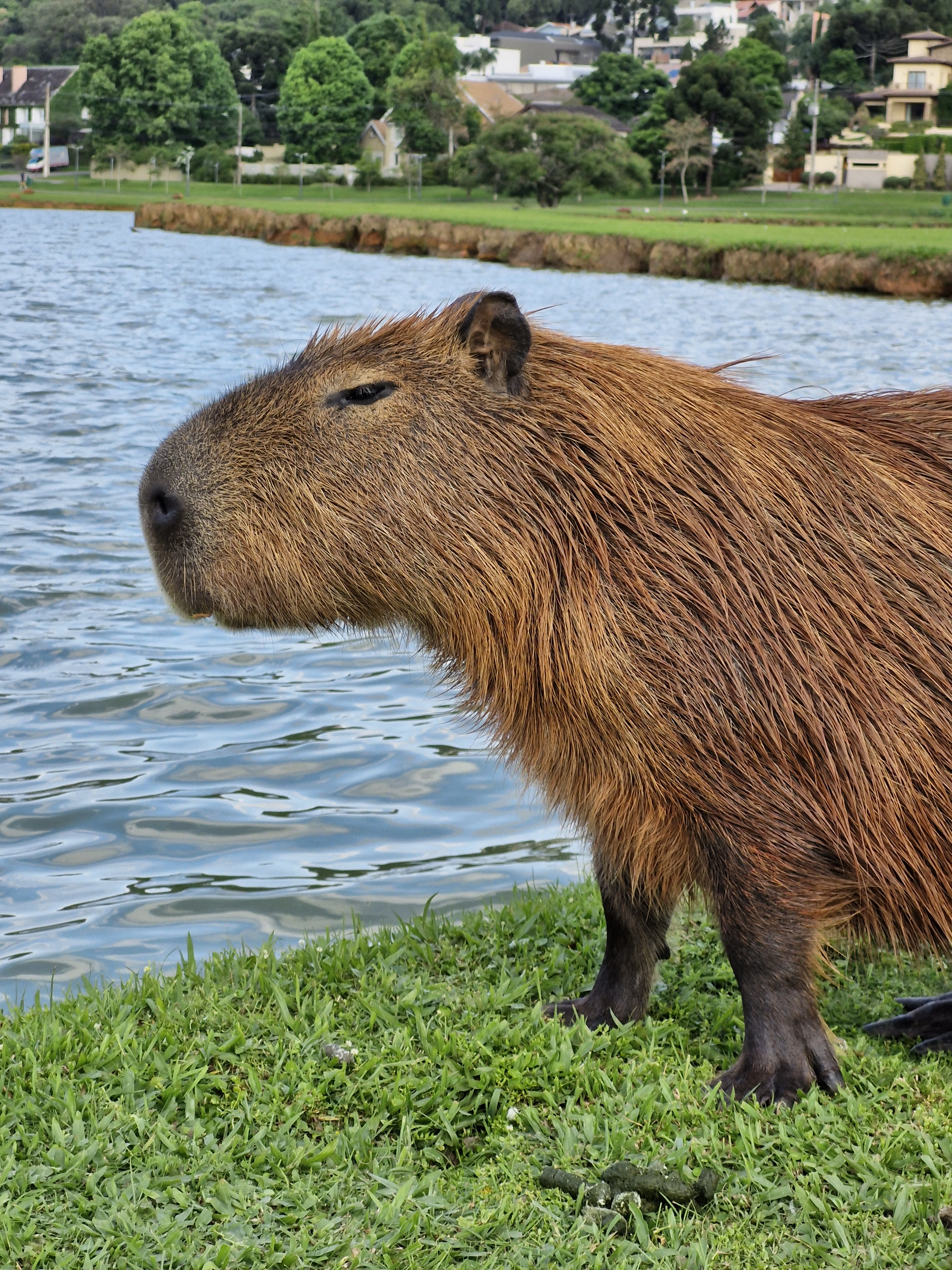
On the Internet, the song has become associated with capybaras.

The song was previewed on Travis Scott's Netflix documentary Look Mom I Can Fly. It originally featured a verse from Scott, which didn't make it to the final version. He later performed a portion of the song at the 2019 Astroworld Festival.

== Credits and personnel ==
Credits adapted from Tidal.

- Caleb Toliver – vocals, songwriting, composition
- Jacques Webster II – songwriting, composition, additional production
- Zach Steele – recording
- Sonny Unaezuoke – songwriting, composition, production
- Kevin Gomringer – songwriting, composition, production
- Tim Gomringer – songwriting, composition, production
- Nils Noehden – songwriting, composition, production
- Mike Dean – songwriting, composition, co-production, mastering, mixing
- Jimmy Cash – mixing assistance
- Sage Skolfield – mixing assistance
- Sean Solymar – mixing assistance

== Charts ==
=== Weekly charts ===
Chart (2020)	Peak position
Australia (ARIA)	34
Belgium (Ultratip Bubbling Under Flanders)	26
Canada Hot 100 (Billboard)	35
Greece (IFPI)	21
Iceland (Tónlistinn)	38
Ireland (IRMA)	24
Lithuania (AGATA)	38
New Zealand (RMNZ)	38
Portugal (AFP)	80
Sweden Heatseeker (Sverigetopplistan)	15
UK Singles (Official Charts)	47
UK Hip Hop/R&B (Official Charts)	26
US Billboard Hot 100	57
US Hot R&B/Hip-Hop Songs (Billboard)	23
US Rhythmic Airplay (Billboard)	10
US Rolling Stone Top 100	31

=== Year-end charts ===
Chart (2020)	Position
US Hot R&B/Hip-Hop Songs (Billboard)	60
US Rhythmic (Billboard)	46

== Certifications ==
Region	Certification	Certified units/sales
Brazil (Pro-Música Brasil)	Gold	20,000^{‡}
Canada (Music Canada)	4× Platinum	320,000^{‡}
Denmark (IFPI Danmark)	Gold	45,000^{‡}
France (SNEP)	Gold	100,000^{‡}
New Zealand (RMNZ)	2× Platinum	60,000^{‡}
Poland (ZPAV)	Platinum	50,000^{‡}
Portugal (AFP)	Gold	5,000^{‡}
United Kingdom (BPI)	Gold	400,000^{‡}
United States (RIAA)	3× Platinum	3,000,000^{‡}
^{‡} Sales+streaming figures based on certification alone.
