= Leave the Club =

2023 single by Don Toliver featuring Lil Durk and GloRilla

Single by Don Toliver featuring Lil Durk and GloRilla

from the album Love Sick
- Released: February 17, 2023
- Length: 3:42
- Label: Cactus Jack; Atlantic
- Songwriters: Caleb Toliver; Durk Banks; Gloria Woods; Ozan Yildirim; James Blake; Dylan Cleary-Krell; Anthony Holmes, Jr.; Ciaran Mullan
- Producers: Oz; James Blake; Dez Wright; Hitkidd; Mu Lean

Don Toliver singles chronology
"4 Me" (2023)	"Leave the Club" (2023)	"Private Landing" (2023)

Lil Durk singles chronology
"Hanging with Wolves" (2022)	"Leave the Club" (2023)	"Shoot Who" (2023)

GloRilla singles chronology
"Internet Trolls" (2023)	"Leave the Club" (2023)	"Ex's" (Phatnall Remix) (2023)

"Leave the Club" is a song by American rapper and singer Don Toliver featuring fellow American rappers Lil Durk and GloRilla. It was released through Cactus Jack and Atlantic Records as the third single from Toliver's third studio album, Love Sick, on February 17, 2023. The three artists wrote the song with producers Oz, James Blake, Dez Wright, Hitkidd, and Mu Lean.

== Composition ==
The song features a "spacey, trap-centric" beat and is split into two parts, the first of which lyrically finds Don Toliver requesting a woman to "bust it open" for him and wanting to leave the club with her as he would rather spend the night at home, which he tries to convince her. Meanwhile, Lil Durk is also at the club when his partner remotely tells him to come home; although he is interested in a few women at the club, he leaves via Uber. During the transition to the second part, the beat changes to a more "downtempo, menacing canvas", over which GloRilla raps in a "gritty" flow, taking on the role of the woman telling the man to leave the club.

== Visualizer ==
The single was released with an accompanying visualizer which draws inspiration from culture in the 1970s and disco.

== Charts ==
Chart performance for "Leave the Club"
Chart (2023)	Peak position
US Bubbling Under Hot 100 (Billboard)	5
US Hot R&B/Hip-Hop Songs (Billboard)	43
