= Had Enough (Don Toliver song) =

2019 single by Don Toliver

Single by Don Toliver featuring Quavo and Offset

from the album JackBoys and Heaven or Hell
- Released: December 27, 2019
- Length: 2:37
- Label: Cactus Jack; Epic
- Songwriters: Caleb Toliver; Quavious Marshall; Kiari Cephus; Beyoncé Knowles; Shawn Carter; Marcello Valenzano; Andre Lyon; Homer Steinweiss; Thomas Brenneck; Mike Herard; James Fauntleroy II; Bryan Simmons; Leon Michels; Michael Dean
- Producers: TM88; El Michels; Dean

Don Toliver singles chronology
"Can't Feel My Legs" (2019)	"Had Enough" (2019)	"De La Hoya" (2020)

Quavo singles chronology
"Too Much Shaft" (2019)	"Had Enough" (2019)	"Intentions" (2020)

Offset singles chronology
"Up The Smoke" (2019)	"Had Enough" (2019)	"2 Seater" (2020)

"Had Enough" is a song by American rapper and singer Don Toliver featuring fellow American rappers Quavo and Offset. It was released through Cactus Jack Records and Epic Records as the lead single from JackBoys, a compilation album by Cactus Jack (under the name JackBoys) and the label's founder, fellow American rapper and singer Travis Scott, on December 27, 2019, along with the album. The song was produced by TM88 and El Michels, co-produced by Mike Dean, and additionally produced by Cash Passion without being credited, with the former three writing it with the three artists. Beyoncé, Jay-Z, Marcello Valenzano, Andre Lyon, Homer Steinweiss, Thomas Brenneck, Mike Herard, and James Fauntleroy II are also credited as songwriters due to the song sampling "Summer" by the Carters (the group name of Beyoncé and Jay-Z) from their collaborative studio album, Everything Is Love (2018). The song also appeared on Toliver's debut studio album, Heaven or Hell (2020).

== Background and release ==
Following the success of the Don Toliver's "No Idea" via the popularity it gained through the video sharing app TikTok in late 2019, an unfinished version of "Had Enough", which leaked in May of that year, began to receive attention and was speculated to be a part of the JackBoys compilation album and his forthcoming debut studio album at the time, Heaven or Hell. The song was then officially released on December 27 as a standalone single and as a track off the Cactus Jack Records compilation project JackBoys.

== Lyrics ==
Offset's verse in the song references his relationship with American rapper Cardi B and the strain that the relationship endured during his infidelity scandal in 2018.

== Commercial performance ==
The song is Toliver's second highest-charting single on the Billboard Hot 100, where it peaked at number 52 following the release of the JackBoys compilation project. It also reached number 23 on the Billboard Hot R&B/Hip-Hop Songs chart. Internationally, the song peaked at number 42 in Canada, number 44 in Switzerland, number 60 in the United Kingdom, and number 14 on Sweden's Heatseekers chart.

== Charts ==
Chart (2020)	Peak position
Canada Hot 100 (Billboard)	42
Sweden Heatseekers (Sverigetopplistan)	14
Switzerland (Schweizer Hitparade)	44
UK Singles (Official Charts)	60
US Billboard Hot 100	52
US Hot R&B/Hip-Hop Songs (Billboard)	23
US Rolling Stone Top 100	11

== Certifications ==
Region	Certification	Certified units/sales
Canada (Music Canada)	Platinum	80,000^{‡}
New Zealand (RMNZ)	Gold	15,000^{‡}
United States (RIAA)	Gold	500,000^{‡}
^{‡} Sales+streaming figures based on certification alone.
