= Flicka Da Wrist =

2015 single by Chedda da Connect

"Flicka da Wrist"

Single by Chedda da Connect

from the album Chedda World: The Album
- Released: March 3, 2015
- Recorded: 2014
- Genre: Hip hop; trap
- Length: 3:41
- Label: eOne
- Songwriter: Courtney Allen Milburn
- Producer: Fred On Em

"Flicka da Wrist" is the only single by American rapper Chedda da Connect. It peaked at number 94 on the US Billboard Hot 100.

== Breakthrough ==
The single, released on 3 March 2015, has been remixed by numerous rappers, including Fetty Wap, 2 Chainz, Migos, Soulja Boy, T.I., Rick Ross, and Kevin Gates.

The song became a popular meme on Vine, with characters such as Spider-Man and Squidward dancing to the song in short clips. The dance has been supported on social media by numerous celebrities. In the National Basketball Association, it was used by players such as James Harden and LeBron James as a celebratory move.

== Music video ==
"Flicka Da Wrist" was uploaded on WorldstarHipHop's YouTube channel on March 4, 2015. The video consists of Chedda dancing around and flicking his wrist with his friends.

== Remix ==
The official remix features Fetty Wap, Boosie Badazz, Yo Gotti & Boston George

== Chart performance ==
On the week of May 16, 2015, "Flicka Da Wrist" debuted and peaked at number 94 on the Billboard Hot 100, dropped four spots to number 98 the next week before leaving the chart. The song made two reappearances on the chart before leaving the next week: number 100 the week of June 13 and number 98 the week of July 4.

Chart (2015)	Peak position
US Billboard Hot 100	94
US Hot R&B/Hip-Hop Songs (Billboard)	29
