= Love Sick (album) =

Studio album by Don Toliver
- Released: February 24, 2023
- Genre: R&B
- Length: 52:32
- Label: Cactus Jack; Atlantic
- Producer: 206Derek; Allen Ritter; Boi-1da; Brent Faiyaz; Bryvn; Cardo; Chef9thegod; Corbett; DJ Burn One; DJ Dahi; DJ Fresh; Dez Wright; Dpat; Hit-Boy; Hitkidd; Jahaan Sweet; James Blake; Kaytranada; Los Hendrix; Matty Spats; Mu Lean; Nez; Omar Guetfa; Oz; Rob Bisel; Rodaidh McDonald; Ronny J; Sean Momberger; Sevn Thomas; The Five Points Bakery; TisaKorean; Wheezy; Yung Exclusive

Don Toliver chronology
Life of a Don (2021)	Love Sick (2023)	Hardstone Psycho (2024)

Singles from Love Sick
- 1. "Do It Right" Released: November 18, 2022; 2. "4 Me" Released: February 15, 2023; 3. "Leave the Club" Released: February 17, 2023; 4. "Private Landing" Released: March 14, 2023; 5. "No Pole" Released: February 12, 2025

Love Sick is the third studio album by American rapper and singer Don Toliver. It was released through Cactus Jack and Atlantic Records on February 24, 2023.

The album features guest appearances from James Blake, Lil Durk, GloRilla, Kali Uchis, TisaKorean, Justin Bieber, Future, Wizkid, Charlie Wilson, Brent Faiyaz, and Toro y Moi. The deluxe version of the album was released four days later and features additional guest appearances from Travis Scott and Teezo Touchdown.

Production was handled by multiple producers, including Blake and TisaKorean themselves, Cardo, DJ Burn One, Oz, Wheezy, Hit-Boy, Nez, Rodaidh McDonald, Kaytranada, Sevn Thomas, Boi-1da, DJ Dahi, Ronny J, and DJ Fresh, among others. Love Sick serves as the follow-up to Toliver's second studio album, Life of a Don (2021).

Love Sick was supported by five singles: "Do It Right", "4 Me", "Leave the Club", "Private Landing", and "No Pole". The album received generally favorable reviews from music critics and was a commercial success. It debuted at number eight on the US Billboard 200 chart, earning 40,500 album-equivalent units in its first week.

== Background and promotion ==
On April 3, 2022, Toliver cryptically revealed the album's title through a tweet. In an interview with GQ in September 2022, he described the genres of the album as "futuristic R&B and soul" and confirmed that his girlfriend, Colombian-American singer Kali Uchis would make a guest appearance on it.

In early 2023, Toliver continued teasing the album by posting a story on Instagram that shows a picture of a whiteboard with the album's title written on it. He revealed its release date and cover art on February 17, 2023, followed by the tracklist and featured artists being revealed six days later. On February 24, 2023, the same day that the album was released, Toliver confirmed that a deluxe edition would be released soon along with a teaser video that played a snippet of the song "Embarrassed", which features his Cactus Jack Records label boss, fellow American rapper and singer Travis Scott. Three days later, his engineer, 206Derek, confirmed that it would be released the following day.

=== Singles ===
Toliver released the lead single of the album, "Do It Right", on November 18, 2022.

On February 15, 2023, he released the second single, "4 Me", which features Kali Uchis. Two days later, he released the third single, "Leave the Club", which features fellow American rappers Lil Durk and GloRilla, and also revealed its release date and cover art. The fourth single of the album, "Private Landing", which features Canadian singer Justin Bieber and fellow American rapper Future, was sent to rhythmic contemporary radio on March 14, 2023.

The fifth and final single of the album, "No Pole", which only appears on its deluxe edition, was sent to rhythmic contemporary radio on February 12, 2025.

== Critical reception ==
Professional ratings
Aggregate scores
Source	Rating
Metacritic	68/100
Review scores
Source	Rating
AllMusic	4/5 stars
Clash	8/10
HipHopDX	2.8/5
RapReviews	5/10
Rolling Stone	3/5 stars

According to the review aggregator Metacritic, Love Sick received "generally favorable reviews" based on a weighted average score of 68 out of 100 from 5 critic scores.

Clash's Robin Murray felt that Love Sick "often thrills when Don is left on his own" and that Don uses "flows that blur the lines between rap and R&B", concluding that "amid the glitz, the hype, the online intrusion, Don Toliver still locates a space to call his own – and that's what makes 'Love Sick' so thrilling." Clayton Purdon of Rolling Stone wrote that the album felt superficial, stating: "it's worth considering his superficiality more of a feature than a bug. He's developed a reputation as a sort of Diet Travis [Scott] due to the artists’ close association, but there are worse things to be than reliable." Writing for HipHopDX, Precious Fondren concluded that "the Houston native takes a stab at what most other rap acts are avoiding right now: sing- rapping about love and all the emotions that come with it – trust, betrayal, and letting go. Unlike past work, Toliver attempts to expand his repertoire of content by diving a little deeper beneath the surface. Even with help from his in real life girlfriend [Kali] Uchis, Justin Bieber, Future, and Wilson, the LP comes up short in delivering songs that standout amongst his peers".

== Commercial performance ==
Love Sick debuted at number eight on the US Billboard 200 chart, earning 40,500 album-equivalent units (including 1,000 copies in pure album sales) in its first week. The album also accumulated a total of 51.23 million on-demand streams of the album's songs.

== Track listing ==
Love Sick track listing
No.	Title	Writer(s)	Producer(s)	Length
1.	"LoveSickness"	Caleb Toliver; Ronald LaTour; David Sweeten; Carlos Muñoz; Richard Brown; Walter Williams	Cardo; DJ Burn One; Los Hendrix; the Five Points Bakery	1:54
2.	"Let Her Go" (featuring James Blake)	Toliver; James Litherland; Dylan Cleary-Krell; Derek Anderson	James Blake; Dez Wright; 206Derek	3:12
3.	"Leave the Club" (featuring Lil Durk and GloRilla)	Toliver; Durk Banks; Gloria Woods; Ozan Yildirim; Cleary-Krell; Anthony Holmes, Jr.; Ciaran Mullan; Litherland	Oz; Dez Wright; Hitkidd; Mu Lean; James Blake^{[a]}	3:42
4.	"4 Me" (featuring Kali Uchis)	Toliver; Karly Loaiza; Wesley Glass; Moses Davis; Pharrell Williams; Charles Hugo; Cleveland Browne; Billy Walsh	Wheezy; Sean Momberger	2:40
5.	"Go Down" (featuring TisaKorean)	Toliver; Domonic Patten; Chauncey Hollis, Jr.; Dustin Corbett; Marcus Ecby	TisaKorean; Hit-Boy; Corbett	3:30
6.	"Time Heals All"	Toliver; Allen Ritter; Anderson; Bryan Yepes; Matthew Spatola	Ritter; 206Derek; Bryvn; Matty Spats	3:53
7.	"Leather Coat"	Toliver; Roderick McDonald; Nesbitt Wesonga, Jr.; Muñoz; Lisa Stansfield; Andrew Morris; Ian Devaney	Rodaidh McDonald; Nez; Los Hendrix	4:01
8.	"Honeymoon"	Toliver; Louis Celestin; Douglas Ford	Kaytranada	3:04
9.	"Private Landing" (featuring Justin Bieber and Future)	Toliver; Justin Bieber; Nayvadius Wilburn; Rob Bisel; LaTour; Omar Guetfa; Anderson	Bisel; Cardo; Guetfa; 206Derek	3:58
10.	"Slow Motion" (featuring Wizkid)	Toliver; Ayodeji Balogun; Rupert Thomas, Jr.; Litherland; Yepes	Sevn Thomas; James Blake; Bryvn	2:48
11.	"Do It Right"	Toliver; Jahaan Sweet; Matthew Samuels; Louis Bell; Walsh; Harold Clayton; Malcolm Perry; Sigidi Abdullah	Sweet; Boi-1da^{[a]}	2:54
12.	"If I Had" (featuring Charlie Wilson)	Toliver; Charles Wilson; Dacoury Natche; Jai Paul; Anthony Clemons, Jr.; John Key; Ely Rise; Danny McKinnon	DJ Dahi	3:28
13.	"Company Pt. 3"	Toliver; Wesonga; Anderson; Munoz	Nez; 206Derek; Los Hendrix	3:00
14.	"Bus Stop" (featuring Brent Faiyaz)	Toliver; Christopher Wood; Hollis; Anderson; David Patino; Edward Riley; Eric Williams; Grover Washington, Jr.; Clifton Lighty; James Simmons; Wesley Hogges	Brent Faiyaz; Hit-Boy; 206Derek; Dpat	3:56
15.	"Cinderella" (featuring Toro y Moi)	Toliver; Chaz Bear; Ronald Spence, Jr.	Ronny J	3:46
16.	"Encouragement"	Toliver; Natche; Ford; Key; Rise; McKinnon	DJ Dahi	2:56
Total length:				52:32

Love Sick deluxe edition additional tracks
No.	Title	Writer(s)	Producer(s)	Length
1.	"No Pole"	Toliver; LaTour; Daniel Stein; Ford	Cardo; DJ Fresh	3:07
2.	"Embarrassed" (featuring Travis Scott)	Toliver; Jacques Webster II; Amir Esmailian; Ford; Glass; Cleary-Krell	Wheezy; Dez Wright	3:12
3.	"Geronimo"	Toliver; Sweet	Sweet	2:03
4.	"Luckily I'm Having" (featuring Teezo Touchdown)	Toliver; Aaron Thomas; LaTour; Daveon Jackson; Gonçalo Brás	Cardo; Yung Exclusive; Chef9thegod	3:14
Total length:				64:27

Sample credits

- "4 Me" contains samples from "Girls Dem Sugar", written by Moses Davis, Pharrell Williams, Charles Hugo, and Cleveland Browne, as performed by Beenie Man.
- "Go Down" contains samples from "Backseat", written by Domonic Patten, as performed by TisaKorean.
- "Leather Coat" contains an interpolation from "All Around the World", written by Lisa Stansfield, Andrew Morris, and Ian Devaney, as performed by Stansfield.
- "Do It Right" contains interpolations from "Take Your Time (Do It Right)", written by Harold Clayton, Malcolm Perry, and Sigidi Abdullah, as performed by the S.O.S. Band.
- "If I Had" contains samples from "Do You Love Her Now", written and performed by Jai Paul.
- "Bus Stop" contains samples from "I Can't Get You (Out of My Mind)", written by Edward Riley, Eric Williams, Grover Washington, Jr., Clifton Lighty, James Simmons, and Wesley Hogges, as performed by Blackstreet.

== Personnel ==
Performers

- Don Toliver – vocals
- James Blake – vocals (2)
- Lil Durk – vocals (3)
- GloRilla – vocals (3)
- Kali Uchis – vocals (4)
- TisaKorean – vocals (5)
- Justin Bieber – vocals (9)
- Future – vocals (9)
- Wizkid – vocals (10)
- Charlie Wilson – vocals (12)
- Brent Faiyaz – vocals (14)
- Toro y Moi – vocals (15)

Technical

- Joe LaPorta – mastering
- Derek "206derek" Anderson – mixing, engineering
- Jaycen Joshua – mixing
- Austin Jux Chandler – engineering (4)
- Ryan Mellow – engineering (9)
- Leandro "Dro" Higaldo – engineering (10)
- Jimmy Cash – engineering (13)
- Damon Riggins Jr. – mixing assistance
- Jacob Richards – mixing assistance
- Mike Seaberg – mixing assistance
- Rachael Blum – mixing assistance
- Jonathan Lopez – engineering assistance (1, 3, 10, 15)
- Hayden Duncan – engineering assistance (2)
- Dominic Vicario – engineering assistance (9)
- Justin "Jusvibes" Gibson – additional vocal recording (3)
- Eric Manco – additional vocals recording (9)
- Josh Gudwin – additional vocal recording (9)
- Itai Schwartz – additional vocal recording (14)

== Charts ==
=== Weekly charts ===
Weekly chart performance for Love Sick
Chart (2023)	Peak position
Australian Albums (ARIA)	61
Austrian Albums (Ö3 Austria)	25
Belgian Albums (Ultratop Flanders)	71
Belgian Albums (Ultratop Wallonia)	76
Canadian Albums (Billboard)	10
Dutch Albums (Album Top 100)	40
French Albums (SNEP)	59
German Albums (Offizielle Top 100)	42
Irish Albums (IRMA)	72
Lithuanian Albums (AGATA)	47
New Zealand Albums (RMNZ)	28
Swiss Albums (Schweizer Hitparade)	12
UK Albums (Official Charts)	36
US Billboard 200	8
US Top R&B/Hip-Hop Albums (Billboard)	4

=== Year-end charts ===
Year-end chart performance for Love Sick
Chart (2023)	Position
US Top R&B/Hip-Hop Albums (Billboard)	71

== Certifications ==
Certifications for Love Sick
Region	Certification	Certified units/sales
Canada (Music Canada)	Platinum	80,000^{‡}
New Zealand (RMNZ)	Gold	7,500^{‡}
United States (RIAA)	Gold	500,000^{‡}
^{‡} Sales+streaming figures based on certification alone.
