= Stay with Me (Calvin Harris, Justin Timberlake, Halsey and Pharrell Williams song) =

2022 single

Single by Calvin Harris, Justin Timberlake, Halsey and Pharrell

from the album Funk Wav Bounces Vol. 2
- Released: 15 July 2022
- Genre: Disco; pop
- Length: 3:49; 5:13 (music video version)
- Label: Columbia
- Songwriters: Adam Wiles; Justin Timberlake; Ashley Frangipane; Pharrell Williams; James Fauntleroy
- Producer: Calvin Harris

Calvin Harris singles chronology
"New Money" (2022)	"Stay with Me" (2022)	"New to You" (2022)

Justin Timberlake singles chronology
"Better Days" (2020)	"Stay with Me" (2022)	"Sin Fin" (2022)

Halsey singles chronology
"So Good" (2022)	"Stay with Me" (2022)	"Die 4 Me" (2023)

Pharrell singles chronology
"No Más" (2022)	"Stay with Me" (2022)	"Down in Atlanta" (2022)

Music video
- "Stay with Me" on YouTube

"Stay with Me" is a song by the Scottish record producer Calvin Harris and the American singers Justin Timberlake, Halsey and Pharrell Williams. Produced by the former and written by the artists alongside James Fauntleroy, it was released on 15 July 2022 through Columbia Records as the third single from Harris's sixth album, Funk Wav Bounces Vol. 2.

== Background ==
On 6 July 2022, Harris announced the collaboration, song title, and release date, with a picture of the four artists at the shoot of the accompanying music video. Before the release of "Stay with Me", Williams had collaborated with both Harris and Timberlake on separate occasions. In collaboration with Harris, Williams was featured alongside American singer Katy Perry and American rapper Big Sean on the 2017 single "Feels" and, in the same year, on "Heatstroke" with American rapper Young Thug and American singer Ariana Grande. Williams and Timberlake worked together on the 2014 joint track "Brand New".

== Composition and lyrics ==
"Stay with Me" is a funk-inspired disco and pop song. It lets a psychedelic "crispy guitar and a thick-ever present bass" take the center stage for the production. Williams uses a high pitch in the pre-chorus: "The energy is flowing, it keeps us glowing / So we don't need no lights, why is it on? / I'm talking to you, girl, it's a new world". On the chorus, Halsey sings over funk-led production: "I've been waiting for you all year / Come play, make a mess right here / Do whatever, I like it weird / Okay, let 'em disappear / Say whatever you want to hear/ Just stay". She duets with Timberlake on the post-chorus: "All night / Come on and stay with me / Let's stay tight / Come on, let's stay, baby".

== Music video ==
The official music video for "Stay with Me", directed by Emil Nava, premiered on Harris' YouTube channel alongside the song's release on 15 July 2022. The video sees Harris, Timberlake, Halsey, and Williams sporting bright colors as they perform the song, with Timberlake imitating a guitar in the air with his hands and dancing on a moving walkway. The music video also adds an extended outro - this extended outro is titled "Stay With Me (Part 2)" and follows "Stay With Me" on Funk Wav Bounces Vol. 2.

The music video on YouTube has received over 30 million views as of April 2024.

== Credits and personnel ==
- Calvin Harris – production, songwriting, recording, vocal production
- Justin Timberlake – vocals, songwriting, vocal production
- Halsey – vocals, songwriting
- Pharrell Williams – vocals, songwriting, vocal production
- James Fauntleroy – songwriting
- Everton Nelson – violin
- Emil Chakalov – violin
- Hayley Pomfrett – violin
- Lucy Wilkins – violin
- Marianne Haynes – violin
- Charis Jenson – violin
- Tom Pigott-Smith – violin
- Patrick Kiernan – violin
- Ian Humphries – violin
- Perry Montague-Mason – violin
- Richard George – violin
- Warren Zielinski – violin
- Charlie Brown – violin
- John Mills – violin
- Bruce White – viola
- Andy Parker – viola
- Adrian Smith – viola
- Reiad Chibah – viola
- Sara Hajir – cello
- Nick Cooper – cello
- Ian Burdge – cello
- Chris Worsey – cello
- Manny Marroquin – mixing
- Dave Kutch – mastering
- Brandon Buttner – recording, miscellaneous production
- Damien Lewis – recording
- Chris Godbey – recording
- Mike Larson – recording
- Stephen Fitzmaurice – recording
- Anthony Vilchis – engineering assistance
- Trey Station – engineering assistance
- Zach Pereyra – engineering assistance
- Mark Goodchild – miscellaneous production
- Emma Marks – miscellaneous production
- Adele Phillips – miscellaneous production

== Charts ==
=== Weekly charts ===
Weekly chart performance for "Stay with Me"
Chart (2022)	Peak position
Australia (ARIA)	78
Belgium (Ultratop 50 Flanders)	28
Belgium (Ultratop 50 Wallonia)	21
Bulgaria Airplay (PROPHON)	5
Canada Hot 100 (Billboard)	51
Canada CHR/Top 40 (Billboard)	36
Canada Hot AC (Billboard)	49
CIS Airplay (TopHit)	66
Czech Republic Airplay (ČNS IFPI)	51
Global 200 (Billboard)	73
Iceland (Tónlistinn)	29
Ireland (IRMA)	15
Japan Hot Overseas (Billboard Japan)	4
Lithuania (AGATA)	58
Mexico Ingles Airplay (Billboard)	1
Netherlands (Dutch Top 40)	16
Netherlands (Single Top 100)	35
New Zealand Hot Singles (RMNZ)	2
Poland Airplay (ZPAV)	20
San Marino Airplay (SMRTV Top 50)	17
Slovakia Airplay (ČNS IFPI)	55
South Korea Download (Circle)	139
Sweden (Sverigetopplistan)	43
UK Singles (Official Charts)	10
US Bubbling Under Hot 100 (Billboard)	2
US Hot Dance/Electronic Songs (Billboard)	9

2026 weekly chart performance for "Stay with Me"
Chart (2026)	Peak position
Venezuela Airplay (Record Report)	95

=== Year-end charts ===
Year-end chart performance for "Stay with Me"
Chart (2022)	Position
Belgium (Ultratop 50 Flanders)	189
Belgium (Ultratop 50 Wallonia)	115
US Hot Dance/Electronic Songs (Billboard)	51

== Certifications ==
Certifications and sales for "Stay with Me"
Region	Certification	Certified units/sales
Australia (ARIA)	Gold	35,000^{‡}
Brazil (Pro-Música Brasil)	Gold	20,000^{‡}
United Kingdom (BPI)	Silver	200,000^{‡}
^{‡} Sales+streaming figures based on certification alone.
