= Ain't Safe =

2022 single by Trippie Redd and Don Toliver

Single by Trippie Redd featuring Don Toliver
- Released: October 28, 2022
- Genre: Trap
- Length: 2:48
- Label: TenThousand Projects
- Songwriters: Michael White IV; Caleb Toliver; 2one2; Quincy Riley; Tariq Beats; Dave-O
- Producers: 2one2; Quincy Riley; Tariq Beats; Dave-O

Trippie Redd singles chronology
"Late 2" (2022)	"Ain't Safe" (2022)	"Panic Attack" (2022)

Don Toliver singles chronology
"One Time" (2022)	"Ain't Safe" (2022)	"Do It Right" (2022)

Music video
- "Ain't Safe" on YouTube

"Ain't Safe" is a song by American rappers and singer Trippie Redd featuring fellow American rapper and singer Don Toliver. It was released on October 28, 2022. The song peaked at number 92 on the Billboard Hot 100.

== Composition ==
In regard to production, the song borrows "psychedelic trap and melodic song structures and verses" which is reminiscent of Don Toliver's music. Lyrically, the song focuses on the rappers keeping their guards up and emphasizes that their enemies are not safe from them. Toliver sings about being strapped with .40 S&W and taking OxyContin.

== Critical reception ==
The song received generally positive reviews. Lexi Lane of Uproxx wrote that "the catchy production compliments each of the rapper's verses" and "By the song's outro instrumental, it feels reminiscent of floating through space." Gabriel Bras Nevares of HotNewHipHop wrote of the production, "It's nothing new at this point, but the graceful piano melodies and dense ad-libs make for a fun atmosphere to match the percussion. It's the type of beat that isn't hot on impact, with its bouncy bass hits and understated hi-hats and snares, but it works engagingly as a dreamy combo." In addition, he praised the collaboration of Trippie Redd and Don Toliver. In regard to Toliver's vocals, he wrote, "His voice is always a winner for tracks like these, especially when it's paired with a dynamic flow", while regarding Redd he wrote, "He expands on a lot of the same flexes and mindsets that Don started the track with, but with a more powerful vocal performance."

== Music video ==
The music video premiered on November 2, 2022 and was directed by Nolan Riddle. It sees Trippie Redd and Don Toliver in a "trippy" landscape, where there are "otherworldly" plants and creatures.

== Credits and personnel ==
- Trippie Redd – vocals, songwriting
- Don Toliver – vocals, songwriting
- Dave-O – production, songwriting
- Quincy Riley – production, songwriting
- 2one2 – production, songwriting
- Tariq Beats – production, songwriting
- Igor Mamet – mastering, mixing, recording
- 206Derek - mixing
- Koen Heldens - mixing

== Charts ==
Chart (2022)	Peak position
New Zealand Hot Singles (RMNZ)	10
US Billboard Hot 100	92
US Hot R&B/Hip-Hop Songs (Billboard)	25
