= Mafia (Travis Scott song) =

2021 single by Travis Scott

- "Escape Plan"/"Mafia" single cover

Single by Travis Scott
- Released: November 5, 2021
- Genre: Trap
- Length: 4:00
- Label: Epic; Cactus Jack
- Songwriters: Jacques Webster II; Jermaine Cole; Matthew Samuels; Jahaan Sweet
- Producers: Boi-1da; Sweet

Travis Scott singles chronology
"Bubbly" (2021)	"Mafia" / "Escape Plan" (2021)	"Hold That Heat" (2022)

Music video
- "Mafia (Performance at 2022 Billboard Music Awards)" on YouTube

"Mafia" (stylized in all caps) is a song by American rapper and singer Travis Scott. It was released on November 5, 2021, concurrently with another single, "Escape Plan", which are both a part of a conjoined single titled Escape Plan / Mafia. The song was written by Travis Scott alongside producers Boi-1da and Jahaan Sweet; with additional writing credits going to J. Cole, who provides additional vocals throughout the song.

== Credits and personnel ==
Credits adapted from Tidal.

- Travis Scott – vocals, songwriting, recording
- J. Cole – additional vocals, songwriting
- Boi-1da – production, songwriting
- Jahaan Sweet – production, songwriting, piano
- Mike Dean – mixing, mastering
- Derek "206Derek" Anderson – recording, assistant engineering

== Charts ==
Chart performance for "Mafia"
Chart (2021)	Peak position
Australia (ARIA)	47
Austria (Ö3 Austria Top 40)	44
Canada Hot 100 (Billboard)	16
Czech Republic Singles Digital (ČNS IFPI)	50
Germany (GfK)	60
Global 200 (Billboard)	19
Ireland (IRMA)	40
Italy (FIMI)	67
Lithuania (AGATA)	39
Netherlands (Single Top 100)	81
New Zealand Hot Singles (RMNZ)	4
Portugal (AFP)	34
Slovakia (Singles Digitál Top 100)	24
South Africa (TOSAC)	6
Sweden Heatseeker (Sverigetopplistan)	6
Switzerland (Schweizer Hitparade)	16
UK Singles (OCC)	41
UK Hip Hop/R&B (OCC)	18
US Billboard Hot 100	26
US Hot R&B/Hip-Hop Songs (Billboard)	10

== Certifications ==
Certifications for "Mafia"
Region	Certification	Certified units/sales
Brazil (Pro-Música Brasil)	Platinum	40,000^{‡}
United States (RIAA)	Gold	500,000^{‡}
^{‡} Sales+streaming figures based on certification alone.
