= One Time (Nav and Don Toliver song) =

Song by Nav and Don Toliver featuring Future

Single by Nav and Don Toliver featuring Future

from the album Demons Protected by Angels
- Released: September 13, 2022
- Length: 3:09
- Label: XO; Republic
- Songwriters: Navraj Goraya; Caleb Toliver; Nayvadius Wilburn; Amir Esmailian; Wesley Glass; Dylan Cleary-Krell
- Producers: Wheezy; Dez Wright (co.)

Nav singles chronology
"Wrong Decisions" (2022)	"One Time" (2022)	"Fenty" (2022)

Don Toliver singles chronology
"Scrape It Off" (2022)	"One Time" (2022)	"Ain't Safe" (2022)

Future singles chronology
"Love You Better" (2022)	"One Time" (2022)	"Good On Love" (2022)

Music video
- "One Time" on YouTube

"One Time" is a song by Canadian rapper Nav and American rapper Don Toliver featuring fellow American rapper Future. Written alongside Cash XO, producer Wheezy, and co-producer Dez Wright, it was released as the third single from the former's fourth studio album Demons Protected by Angels (2022) on September 13, 2022.

== Composition ==
In the song, Nav details his lifestyle of riches and women as a result of his fame, as well as the positive and negative aspects of it. The chorus is sung by Don Toliver.

== Music video ==
The official music video was released on September 13, 2022 along with the music video of Nav and Lil Baby's song "Never Sleep". Directed by Spike Jordan, it finds Nav, Don Toliver and Future checking in a motel where supernatural events occur, located in the middle of a desert. The clip opens with Toliver sitting on the roof of a Buick in the desert and singing, while women walk past him and enter a bar. Then, the scene shifts to Nav sitting in a motel room, seducing a woman with a severed hand laying on the bed next to him. Future appears on television from a set inspired by the Poltergeist film franchise, performing his verse in a bathroom in the company of two women. Toliver appears throughout different locations outside the motel.

== Live performances ==
Nav and Don Toliver performed the song on Jimmy Kimmel Live! on October 4, 2022.

== Charts ==
Chart performance for "One Time"
Chart (2022)	Peak position
Canada Hot 100 (Billboard)	55
US Bubbling Under Hot 100 (Billboard)	5
US Hot R&B/Hip-Hop Songs (Billboard)	37
US Rhythmic Airplay (Billboard)	29
