= Demons Protected by Angels =

Studio album by Nav
- Released: September 9, 2022
- Length: 55:18
- Labels: XO; Republic
- Producers: Nav; Aaron Paris; Alawais; BenjiCold; Bodi; Boi-1da; Carlton McDowell; Cash; Chanelbigs; Darko; Dez Wright; Fabio Aguilar; Frost; Ghostrage; Grayson; Honeywoods; Jacobsen; Keanu Beats; London Cyr; Mike Dean; Millaire; Money Musik; Oscar Zulu; Piscot; Prodbyace; Pro Logic; Reece; Rex Kudo; Smplgtwy; Tay Keith; Wheezy; Yeeshy; Zubnid

Nav chronology
Emergency Tsunami (2020)	Demons Protected by Angels (2022)	OMW2 Rexdale (2025)

Singles from Demons Protected by Angels
- 1. "Never Sleep" Released: July 29, 2022; 2. "Wrong Decisions" Released: August 23, 2022; 3. "One Time" Released: September 13, 2022

Demons Protected by Angels is the fourth studio album by Canadian rapper Nav. It was released through XO and Republic Records on September 9, 2022. The album contains guest appearances from Lil Uzi Vert, Lil Baby, Travis Scott, Don Toliver, Future, Gunna, Lil Durk, RealestK, Bryson Tiller, and Babyface Ray. The bonus version was released on September 14, 2022. It includes an additional guest appearance from Internet Money for the previously released 2020 single, "Lemonade", their collaboration alongside Gunna and Don Toliver, which features Nav. Production on the album was handled by Nav himself, Tay Keith, Boi-1da, Money Musik, Pro Logic, Grayson, Mike Dean, and Wheezy, among others. The album was nominated for Album of the Year and Rap Album/EP of the Year, and "Wrong Decisions" for Rap Single of the Year, at the Juno Awards of 2023.

== Background and promotion ==
On June 27, 2022, Nav took to Twitter to announce the title of the album and shared a screenshot of the tweet on social media. On July 29, 2022, he released the lead single, "Never Sleep", a collaboration with American rapper Lil Baby, which features fellow American rapper and singer Travis Scott. The same day the song was released, he was interviewed by Complex, in which he spoke about the album and how it was named:

The album title was inspired by a sweater that my friend had made. And I've begged him to get the sweater. I was like, "Yo, I wanna wear your shit and support my friend's stuff." So he brought it out and it had that on the back of the sweater. And it was very meaningful to me, because he came up with that himself when his mom passed away about a year ago. So I was like, "Wow, that's even better." Like, it actually has a good meeting [sic]. So that's why we came up with it. [...] Someone close to me had pointed my eyes toward the sweater. They're like, "Oh, that's fire, can you make an album called that?" But the whole quote on this sweater was "fighting demons protected by angels." We thought it was too long. Then one of my producers had mentioned, "Maybe we should take the 'fighting' out." We thought about it, and called our friends to ask them their opinion. We all said it's kind of dope. Then one day we were playing dominoes in the studio, and I just randomly asked him, 'How'd you come up with that?' He found that on Google, and then he told me where it's from. It was even more meaningful.

On August 23, 2022, Nav released the second single of the album, "Wrong Decisions". Exactly one week later, he revealed the release date, along with a trailer video that revealed the guest artists, which did not include American rapper Gunna on the list at the time. On September 5, 2022, Nav shared the cover art for the album. He revealed the tracklist in collaboration with Spotify hip hop playlist RapCaviar the following day. On September 8, 2022, the day before the album was released, Nav was interviewed by Canadian-American YouTube channel Nelk's Full Send Podcast, in which he revealed that he recorded a song with fellow Canadian rapper and singer Drake, but he decided to not include it on the album because he felt that they "could've done a better song and the timeframe was just not good" and along with the latter is "such a big artist" that he did not want the song to "take away from anything else on the album". On September 13, 2022, "One Time", a collaboration with American rapper and singer Don Toliver, which features fellow American rapper Future, was released as the third and final single of the album.

== Critical reception ==
Professional ratings
Aggregate scores
Source	Rating
Metacritic	59/100
Review scores
Source	Rating
AllMusic	3/5 stars
Pitchfork	6.2/10
Slant Magazine	2/5 stars

Demons Protected by Angels was met with generally mixed reviews. At Metacritic, which assigns a normalized rating out of 100 to reviews from professional publications, the album received an average score of 59 based on 4 reviews, indicating "mixed or average reviews". Writing for Pitchfork, Matthew Ritchie felt that Nav "attempts to shift focus away from the beats and features, finally treating the songs like they're his own" and "Nav lets extended moments of true self-awareness break through his manicured shell, momentarily deviating from the soulless bars that often fill his albums", but conversely added that "ceding too much room to guests undermines Nav's individuality and causes the star-powered tracks to veer toward the generic".

=== Accolades ===
Accolades for Demons Protected by Angels
Year	Body	Award	For	Result	Ref.
2023	Juno Awards	Album of the Year	Demons Protected by Angels	Nominated	
2023	Juno Awards	Rap Album/EP of the Year	Demons Protected by Angels	Nominated	
2023	Juno Awards	Rap Single of the Year	"Wrong Decisions"	Nominated	

== Commercial performance ==
Demons Protected by Angels debuted at number two on the US Billboard 200 chart, earning 67,000 album-equivalent units, of which 26,000 were in pure album sales in its first week. It serves as Nav's fifth consecutive top-ten album in the country. The album also accumulated a total of 60.13 million on-demand streams of the album's songs during the tracking week.

== Track listing ==
Demons Protected by Angels track listing
No.	Title	Writer(s)	Producer(s)	Length
1.	"Count on Me (Intro)"	Navraj Goraya; Masamune Kudo; Aaron Cheung; Carlton McDowell, Jr.; Reece Weinberg; Michael Dean	Nav; Rex Kudo; Aaron Paris; McDowell; Reece; Mike Dean^{[a]}	2:06
2.	"Baby"	Goraya; Matthew Samuels; Mohkom Bhangal; Julius Herold; Emile Hilaire	Nav; Boi-1da; Money Musik; Millaire; Darko; Smplgtwy; Zubnid	2:42
3.	"Dead Shot" (with Lil Uzi Vert)	Goraya; Symere Woods; Amir Esmailian; Andrew Franklin	Pro Logic	3:01
4.	"Never Sleep" (with Lil Baby featuring Travis Scott)	Goraya; Dominique Jones; Jacques Webster II; Brytavious Chambers; Grayson Serio; Dean	Tay Keith; Grayson; Dean^{[a]}	3:05
5.	"Last of the Mohicans"	Goraya; Bhangal; Joe Talamo	Nav; Money Musik; Oscar Zulu	2:50
6.	"One Time" (with Don Toliver featuring Future)	Goraya; Caleb Toliver; Nayvadius Wilburn; Esmailian; Wesley Glass; Dylan Cleary-Krell	Wheezy; Dez Wright^{[a]}	3:09
7.	"Demons in My Cup"	Goraya; James Addison	BenjiCold	2:42
8.	"Playa" (with Gunna)	Goraya; Sergio Kitchens; Franklin; Andrea de Bernardi	Pro Logic; Alawais; Prodbyace^{[a]}	2:19
9.	"Weirdo"	Goraya; Esmailian; Glass; Chandler Ingram	Wheezy; Ghostrage^{[a]}	2:00
10.	"My Dawg" (with Lil Durk)	Goraya; Durk Banks; Esmailian; Franklin; Keanu Torres; Fabio Aguilar	Nav; Pro Logic; Keanu Beats; Aguilar	3:17
11.	"Don't Compare"	Goraya; McDowell	Nav; McDowell	2:41
12.	"Interstellar" (with Lil Uzi Vert)	Goraya; Woods; Esmailian; Franklin; Patrick Piscot; Jeppe Jacobsen	Nav; Pro Logic; Piscot; Jacobsen^{[a]}	2:44
13.	"Loaded"	Goraya; Franklin; Bhangal; James Cyr; Yan Cortequisse	Nav; Money Musik; London Cyr; Yeeshy	2:48
14.	"Lost Me" (with RealestK)	Goraya; Rony Kordab; Esmailian; Luke Honeywood; Patrick Bodi	Nav; Money Musik; Honeywoods; Bodi	3:06
15.	"Reset" (with Bryson Tiller)	Goraya; Bryson Tiller; Esmailian; Franklin	Nav; Cash; Pro Logic	3:00
16.	"Mismatch" (with Babyface Ray)	Goraya; Marcellus Register; Esmailian; Glass; Bhangal	Wheezy; Money Musik	2:07
17.	"Wrong Decisions"	Goraya; Kudo; Cheung; McDowell	Nav	2:59
18.	"Destiny"	Goraya; Sugar-Ray Henry; Andreas Bigum	Frost; Chanelbigs	1:52
19.	"Ball in Peace (Outro)"	Goraya; Dean	Nav; Dean^{[a]}	3:37
Total length:				52:03

Bonus track
No.	Title	Writer(s)	Producer(s)	Length
20.	"Lemonade" (performed by Internet Money, Gunna, and Don Toliver featuring Nav)	Danny Snodgrass, Jr.; Nicholas Mira; Alec Wigdahl; Henry Nichols; Elias Latrou; Kitchens; Toliver; Goraya; Jonathan Mitchell; Jocelyn Donald; Donny Flores	Taz Taylor; Nick Mira; Wigdahl; E-Trou; Pharaoh Vice	3:15
Total length:				55:18

Notes

- ^{^[a]} signifies a co-producer

== Charts ==
=== Weekly charts ===
Weekly chart performance for Demons Protected by Angels
Chart (2022)	Peak position
Canadian Albums (Billboard)	2
French Albums (SNEP)	167
Swiss Albums (Schweizer Hitparade)	92
UK Albums (Official Charts)	55
US Billboard 200	2
US Top R&B/Hip-Hop Albums (Billboard)	1

=== Year-end charts ===
Year-end chart performance for Demons Protected by Angels
Chart (2022)	Position
US Top R&B/Hip-Hop Albums (Billboard)	93

== Certifications ==
Certifications
Region	Certification	Certified units/sales
Canada (Music Canada)	Platinum	80,000^{‡}
^{‡} Sales+streaming figures based on certification alone.
