= Escape Plan (song) =

2021 single by Travis Scott

- "Escape Plan"/"Mafia" single cover

Single by Travis Scott
- Released: November 5, 2021
- Genre: Trap
- Length: 2:30
- Label: Epic; Cactus Jack
- Songwriters: Jacques Webster II; Ozan Yildirim; Nik Frascona
- Producers: Oz; Nik D

Travis Scott singles chronology
"Bubbly" (2021)	"Escape Plan" / "Mafia" (2021)	"Hold That Heat" (2022)

Music video
- "Escape Plan" on YouTube

"Escape Plan" is a song by American rapper and singer Travis Scott. It was released on November 5, 2021, concurrently with another single, "Mafia", which are both a part of a conjoined single titled Escape Plan / Mafia. The song was produced by Oz and Nik D. The album's cover parodies the character Bat Boy from the Weekly World News tabloid.

== Background ==
On June 24, 2021, Spotify previewed a snippet of "Escape Plan" in an advertisement for the company. Exactly one month later, on July 24, 2021, Scott previewed a snippet of the song and its music video and performed a portion of it at Rolling Loud in Miami, Florida, that same night. On October 30, 2021, Scott performed the song again at Rolling Loud, this time in Brooklyn, New York, also previewing a new and extended verse. Scott announced the release of new music on November 4, 2021, the day before "Escape Plan" and "Mafia" were released.

== Music video ==
A music video for "Escape Plan" premiered on November 5, 2021, twelve hours after the release of the song. It was directed by Scott himself alongside Tyler Ross and Eliel Ford. The video starts with Scott listening to the song in his car. He then raps the song from the top of a hill with a security team and guard dogs surrounding him. The next scene sees him taking a Louis Vuitton briefcase and going on a jet before riding an ATV and a motorboat. Finally, he goes with his friends to a party.

== Credits and personnel ==
Credits adapted from Tidal.

- Travis Scott – vocals, songwriting, recording
- Oz – production, songwriting
- Nik D – production, songwriting
- Mike Dean – mixing, mastering
- Derek "206Derek" Anderson – recording

== Charts ==
Chart performance for "Escape Plan"
Chart (2021)	Peak position
Australia (ARIA)	22
Austria (Ö3 Austria Top 40)	25
Canada Hot 100 (Billboard)	9
Czech Republic Singles Digital (ČNS IFPI)	19
Denmark (Tracklisten)	26
Germany (GfK)	35
Global 200 (Billboard)	10
Hungary (Stream Top 40)	22
India International Singles (IMI)	20
Ireland (IRMA)	24
Italy (FIMI)	58
Lithuania (AGATA)	13
Netherlands (Single Top 100)	61
New Zealand (Recorded Music NZ)	25
Norway (VG-lista)	25
Portugal (AFP)	17
Slovakia (Singles Digitál Top 100)	14
South Africa (TOSAC)	8
Sweden (Sverigetopplistan)	67
Switzerland (Schweizer Hitparade)	13
UK Singles (OCC)	23
UK Hip Hop/R&B (OCC)	5
US Billboard Hot 100	11
US Hot R&B/Hip-Hop Songs (Billboard)	3

== Certifications ==
Certifications for "Escape Plan"
Region	Certification	Certified units/sales
Brazil (Pro-Música Brasil)	Gold	20,000^{‡}
United States (RIAA)	Platinum	1,000,000^{‡}
^{‡} Sales+streaming figures based on certification alone.
