= RealestK =

Canadian singer (born 2004)

- Born: Rony Kordab; June 5, 2004 (age 22); Toronto, Canada U.S.
- Genres: R&B; soul
- Occupations: Singer; songwriter
- Instrument: Vocals
- Years active: 2021–present
- Labels: Columbia; D2R

Rony Kordab (born June 5, 2004), known professionally as RealestK, is a Canadian singer and songwriter. His popularity started on the social media platform on TikTok and he rose to fame in 2021 with his breakout single "WFM", which reached number 67 on the Billboard Hot 100. He then received co-signs from fellow Canadian musicians Nav and Drake, and collaborated with the former in late 2022 on the song "Lost Me" from his fourth studio album, Demons Protected by Angels. RealestK released his debut studio album, Dreams 2 Reality, that same year. He has since released two more albums, Real World in 2023, and Forgive to Forget in 2026, as well as several singles.

== Early life ==
Rony Kordab was born on June 5, 2004, in Toronto, Canada, specifically in Scarborough. Both his parents were born and raised in Beirut, Lebanon, later moving to Canada to raise Rony.

== Career ==
On October 6, 2021, RealestK released the single "WFM", alongside its music video. The singer recalled editing the video during a business class, in which his teacher lectured him, but he still continued to do it. The song debuted at number 73 on the Billboard Hot 100 and reached number 67 the following week.

On September 9, 2022, RealestK released a collaboration with Canadian rapper Nav titled "Lost Me", which appeared as the fourteenth track from the latter's fourth studio album, Demons Protected by Angels. The music video for the song premiered the following day. The song serves as his first time working with another artist and Nav also brought him out at Rolling Loud in their hometown of Toronto to perform the song. After releasing some more singles, RealestK released his debut studio album, Dreams 2 Reality, on October 28, 2022.

RealestK released his second studio album, Real World, on October 20, 2023. He followed it with a series of standalone singles through 2024 and 2025, including "Let Me Go," "Selfie," "All You," "Deja Vu," "With You," and "Breathe." In January 2026, he released "Save Me" as the lead single from his third studio album, Forgive to Forget, which arrived on March 20, 2026 via Standard Projects and ADA. the album traces an emotional arc from grief through to acceptance. RealestK supported the release with a spring 2026 tour alongside Bryant Barnes, with dates in Toronto, Montreal, Philadelphia, Brooklyn, and Atlanta.

== Artistry ==
Alex Nino Gheciu of Complex, who interviewed RealestK in February 2022 felt that "RealestK's songs are full of raw candour and vulnerability—he yearns for something real amid an increasingly soulless and nihilistic age" and added that "he's got the lived-in, heart-wrecked conviction of someone twice his age, and one of the most captivating new voices in Canadian R&B".

With the release of Forgive to Forget in 2026, RealestK's music was described as moving further into atmospheric, mood-driven alt-R&B, prioritizing feeling over strict genre conventions. Coverage of the album highlighted his falsetto against cinematic, sweeping production, alongside more stripped-back, instrumentally minimal tracks, and framed the record as a continuation of the introspective, emotionally direct songwriting style he was known for earlier in his career.

== Discography ==
=== Studio albums ===
Studio album
Title	Album details
Dreams 2 Reality	Released: October 28, 2022; Format: Digital download; Label: Columbia, D2R
Real World	Released: October 20, 2023; Format: Digital download; Label: Columbia, D2R
Forgive To Forget	Released: March 20, 2026; Format: Digital download; Label: D2R

=== Singles ===
Title	Year	Peak chart positions					Album
Title	Year	CAN	US	US R&B/HH	US R&B	WW	Album
"Only You"	2021	—	—	—	—	—	Non-album singles
"Swm"	2021	—	—	—	—	—	Non-album singles
"Confessions"	2021	—	—	—	—	—	Non-album singles
"Miss Me"	2021	—	—	—	—	—	Non-album singles
"WFM"	2021	53	67	24	7	56	Dreams 2 Reality
"Patience"	2021	—	—	—	—	—	Non-album single
"Toxic"	2021	—	—	—	—	—	Dreams 2 Reality
"Love Me"	2022	—	—	—	—	—	Dreams 2 Reality
"Don't Walk Away"	2022	—	—	—	—	—	Non-album single
"Leave Me Alone"	2022	—	—	—	—	—	Dreams 2 Reality
"One 4 U"	2022	—	—	—	—	—	Non-album single
"Bruce Wayne"	2022	—	—	—	—	—	Dreams 2 Reality
"Trust"	2022	—	—	—	—	—	Dreams 2 Reality
"I Think I Do"	2022	—	—	—	—	—	Dreams 2 Reality
"Wish You Well"	2023	—	—	—	—	—	Non-album single
"You & I"	2023	—	—	—	—	—	Non-album single
"Stranger"	2023	—	—	—	—	—	Real World
"Better"	2023	—	—	—	—	—	Real World
"It's You"	2023	—	—	—	—	—	Real World
"Let Me Go"	2024	—	—	—	—	—	Non-album single
"Selfie"	2024	—	—	—	—	—	Non-album single
"All You"	2024	—	—	—	—	—	Non-album single
"Deja Vu"	2025	—	—	—	—	—	Non-album single
"Breathe"	2025	—	—	—	—	—	Forgive To Forget
"Save Me"	2026	—	—	—	—	—	Forgive To Forget
"Angels"	2026	—	—	—	—	—	Forgive To Forget
"Dream Girl"	2026	—	—	—	—	—	Non-album single
"Bad"	2026	—	—	—	—	—	Non-album single
"—" denotes a recording that did not chart in that territory.

=== Guest appearance ===
Title	Year	Album
"Lost Me" (with Nav)	2022	Demons Protected by Angels
