= Verzache =

- Born: December 11, 1997 (age 28); Singapore
- Origin: Toronto, Ontario, Canada
- Genres: Alternative; Indie; Bedroom Pop
- Years active: 2014–present

Zachary Farache (born December 11, 1997), professionally known as Verzache (stylized as verzache), is a Canadian singer, songwriter, producer and instrumentalist.

== Biography ==
Farache began with producing electronic music in his teens, and started to create his own music in late 2014. In an interview with Elevator Magazine, he reported that he started with digital music software FL Studio and Logic Pro X, but now uses Ableton Live 9. His first EP, D97, was released in 2017. The EP featured the song "Waiting For You" with musician Swell, which ended up being his most successful track to date. In 2018, and 2019, he started to gain attention with singles "Losing My Love," "Needs," and "No More." In March 2020, one of Farache's upcoming shows in Brooklyn was featured as one of the "12 Pop, Rock and Jazz Concerts to Check Out in N.Y.C. This Weekend" in The New York Times.

== Discography ==
=== Albums ===
- Hypocrite (2025)
- My Head is a Moshpit (2021)
- Thought Pool (2018)

=== EPs ===
- abcdef (2023)
- D97 (2017)

=== Singles ===
- Crash (2025)
- Change (2025)
- Mouth Full of Dirt (2023)
- Call My Own (2023)
- Never Gets Old (2023)
- ur the devil and i've seen the truth (feat. Versache) (2023)
- Feels Like (2022)
- Caffeine (2022)
- Broke Mine (2022)
- All I Need (2021)
- Look Away (2020)
- Calling (2020)
- Messed Up (2020)
- Life Inside (2020)
- Talk (2020)
- I Don't Wanna Be Nothin' (2019)
- Feeling That Feel (2019)
- Cable (2019)
- January (2019)
- No More (2018)
- Needs (2018)
- Losing My Love (2018)
- Attached (2017)
- Fix Me (2017)
- Conscious (2017)
- Juvenescence (2017)
- Prudent (2017)
- Ice Cream (2017)
- Hiccup (2017)
- The Loser (2016)
- French (2016)
