= Never Sleep =

2022 single by Nav and Lil Baby featuring Travis Scott

Single by Nav and Lil Baby featuring Travis Scott

from the album Demons Protected by Angels
- Released: July 29, 2022
- Recorded: May 2022
- Genre: Trap
- Length: 3:05
- Label: XO; Republic
- Songwriters: Navraj Goraya; Dominique Jones; Jacques Webster II; Brytavious Chambers; Grayson Serio; Mike Dean
- Producers: Tay Keith; Grayson; Mike Dean

Nav singles chronology
"Do Not Disturb" (2022)	"Never Sleep" (2022)	"Wrong Decisions" (2022)

Lil Baby singles chronology
"All Dz Chainz" (2022)	"Never Sleep" (2022)	"Staying Alive" (2022)

Travis Scott singles chronology
"Hold That Heat" (2022)	"Never Sleep" (2022)	"Down in Atlanta" (2022)

Music video
- "Never Sleep" on YouTube

"Never Sleep" is a song by Canadian rapper Nav and American rapper Lil Baby featuring fellow American rapper Travis Scott, released on July 29, 2022 as the lead single on the former's fourth studio album, Demons Protected by Angels. The song was written by the artists alongside producers Tay Keith, Grayson, and Mike Dean.

== Background ==
In an interview with Complex, Nav stated that he began as a producer and engineer when composing the song, and that it was recorded two months before it was released. In that interview, he also revealed that he was so focused on mixing the album Demons Protected by Angels that he forgot to announce the song, until his assistant angrily reminded him. Nav teased the song on July 25, 2022, before releasing it on July 29.

== Composition ==
The song finds the three rappers describing their increasing income and rich lifestyles, using "colorful" metaphors that highlight them.

== Music video ==
The official music video was released on September 13, 2022, along with the music video of Nav and Don Toliver's song "One Time". Directed by Evan Larsen, it finds the three artists in a Las Vegas casino. While performing his portion, Travis Scott appears on the backs of pennies from a slot machine, on a jumbotron and playing cards. Nav becomes small in size and raps atop a card table with poker chips scattered around him, while Lil Baby, also shrunk down in size, raps on top of a stack of chips. The clip also features a cameo from fellow Canadian singer and XO label boss The Weeknd, who is seen laughing with Nav as they play blackjack.

== Charts ==
Weekly chart performance for "Never Sleep"
Chart (2022)	Peak position
Canada Hot 100 (Billboard)	23
Global 200 (Billboard)	71
New Zealand Hot Singles (RMNZ)	7
South Africa Streaming (TOSAC)	87
UK Singles (Official Charts)	95
US Billboard Hot 100	50
US Hot R&B/Hip-Hop Songs (Billboard)	19

== Certifications ==
Certifications for "Never Sleep"
Region	Certification	Certified units/sales
Canada (Music Canada)	Platinum	80,000^{‡}
^{‡} Sales+streaming figures based on certification alone.
