= No Idea (song) =

2019 single by Don Toliver

Single by Don Toliver

from the album Heaven or Hell
- Released: May 29, 2019
- Genre: Pop rap; alternative R&B
- Length: 2:33
- Label: Cactus Jack; Atlantic; We Run It
- Songwriters: Caleb Toliver; Ebony Oshunrinde; Tim Gomringer; Kevin Gomringer
- Producers: WondaGurl; Cubeatz

Don Toliver singles chronology
"Back Up" (2019)	"No Idea" (2019)	"Can't Feel My Legs" (2019)

Music video
- "No Idea" on YouTube

"No Idea" is a song by American rapper and singer Don Toliver. It was released through Cactus Jack, Atlantic Records and We Run It Entertainment on May 29, 2019, as the lead single from Toliver's debut studio album, Heaven or Hell (2020). Toliver wrote the song with producers WondaGurl and Cubeatz duo members Tim and Kevin Gomringer. The song gained popularity in December 2019 after going viral on the social media video platform TikTok after multiple famous users on the app created dances to it.

== Background ==
Don Toliver first gained prominence in 2018, after being featured on Travis Scott's Astroworld album, on the track "Can't Say". The song was later certified platinum and Toliver appeared as a supporting act on both legs of the Astroworld tour. He released his second mixtape Donny Womack (named after his alter-ego) the same month as the release of Astroworld, August 2018. He returned with "No Idea" in May 2019. The song gained popularity on the video-sharing app TikTok and rapidly started climbing charts thereafter. Toliver described the song as "the first chapter, the introduction, the real introduction to the chapter [of a new project]".

== Composition ==
"No Idea" sees Don Toliver reference his alter-ego, Donny Womack (inspired by late R&B artist Bobby Womack). Heran Mamo of Billboard magazine described Toliver's vocals as "soulful, gaseous moans", noting the lyrics for containing "the roots of Southern rap". The song consists of a "dark, slinking beat", with Toliver delivering a "refreshing falsetto" during the chorus.

Toliver spoke to Complex about the concept of the song:

"'No Idea' is just basically like another universe for Womack, you know what I'm saying? Coming straight off of the Astroworld trip and Donny Womack, it especially feels like another universe. Just me kind of expressing my thoughts on where I'm at right now and touching back on events in the past, as well."

== Critical reception ==
Frazier Tharpe of Complex magazine said the song is "everything you want from a Don Toliver song", complimenting the "earworm melodies" and Toliver's ability to showcase his growing talents as a writer. Nada Mesh of HotNewHipHop noted how the "dark trappy vibes of the beat" complement Toliver's rapping, described as "effortless flows".

== Music video ==
The music video was also released on May 29, 2019, and directed by Grant Singer. Toliver described the theme of the video: "I'm basically going back down a memory lane type situation, and it kind of fast forwards to right now [2019]. When you listen to the song, and as you get deep into it, you start to figure out. I'm kind of ranting on what's going on right now, you know?"

== TikTok dance ==
Over 8 million videos have been made on TikTok using the song, with over 6 billion plays as of June 2020. Popular TikTok users like Charli D'Amelio, who was the most-followed individual on the platform at the time, helped to popularize the song on the platform. These videos usually consist of users dancing to a snippet of the song. It was the top TikTok song for December 2019.

== Charts ==
=== Weekly charts ===
Chart (2019–2020)	Peak position
Argentina Hot 100 (Billboard)	91
Australia (ARIA)	43
Belgium (Ultratip Bubbling Under Flanders)	4
Belgium (Ultratip Bubbling Under Wallonia)	5
Canada Hot 100 (Billboard)	19
Czech Republic Singles Digital (ČNS IFPI) DJ Purpberry Chopped and Screwed version	55
France (SNEP)	96
Germany (GfK)	86
Hungary (Stream Top 40)	34
Iceland (Tónlistinn)	27
Ireland (IRMA)	38
Latvia (LAIPA)	20
Netherlands (Single Top 100)	75
New Zealand (Recorded Music NZ)	32
Norway (VG-lista)	30
Portugal (AFP)	29
Romania (Airplay 100)	97
Slovakia Singles Digital (ČNS IFPI) DJ Purpberry Chopped and Screwed version	42
Sweden (Sverigetopplistan)	87
Switzerland (Schweizer Hitparade)	41
UK Singles (OCC)	39
US Billboard Hot 100	43
US Hot R&B/Hip-Hop Songs (Billboard)	16
US Rhythmic Airplay (Billboard)	37
US Rolling Stone Top 100	27

=== Year-end charts ===
Chart (2020)	Position
Canada (Canadian Hot 100)	44
US Hot R&B/Hip-Hop Songs (Billboard)	73

== Certifications ==
Region	Certification	Certified units/sales
Australia (ARIA)	Platinum	70,000^{‡}
Brazil (Pro-Música Brasil)	2× Platinum	80,000^{‡}
Canada (Music Canada)	5× Platinum	400,000^{‡}
Denmark (IFPI Danmark)	Gold	45,000^{‡}
France (SNEP)	Platinum	200,000^{‡}
Italy (FIMI)	Gold	50,000^{‡}
New Zealand (RMNZ)	2× Platinum	60,000^{‡}
Poland (ZPAV)	Platinum	20,000^{‡}
Portugal (AFP)	Platinum	10,000^{‡}
Spain (Promusicae)	Gold	30,000^{‡}
United Kingdom (BPI)	Platinum	600,000^{‡}
United States (RIAA)	3× Platinum	3,000,000^{‡}
^{‡} Sales+streaming figures based on certification alone.

== Release history ==
Country	Date	Format	Label	Ref.
Various	May 29, 2019	Digital download; streaming	Cactus Jack; Atlantic	
United States	February 4, 2020	Rhythmic contemporary radio	Cactus Jack; Atlantic	
