= Chedda Da Connect =

American rapper (born 1986)

Chedda da Connect
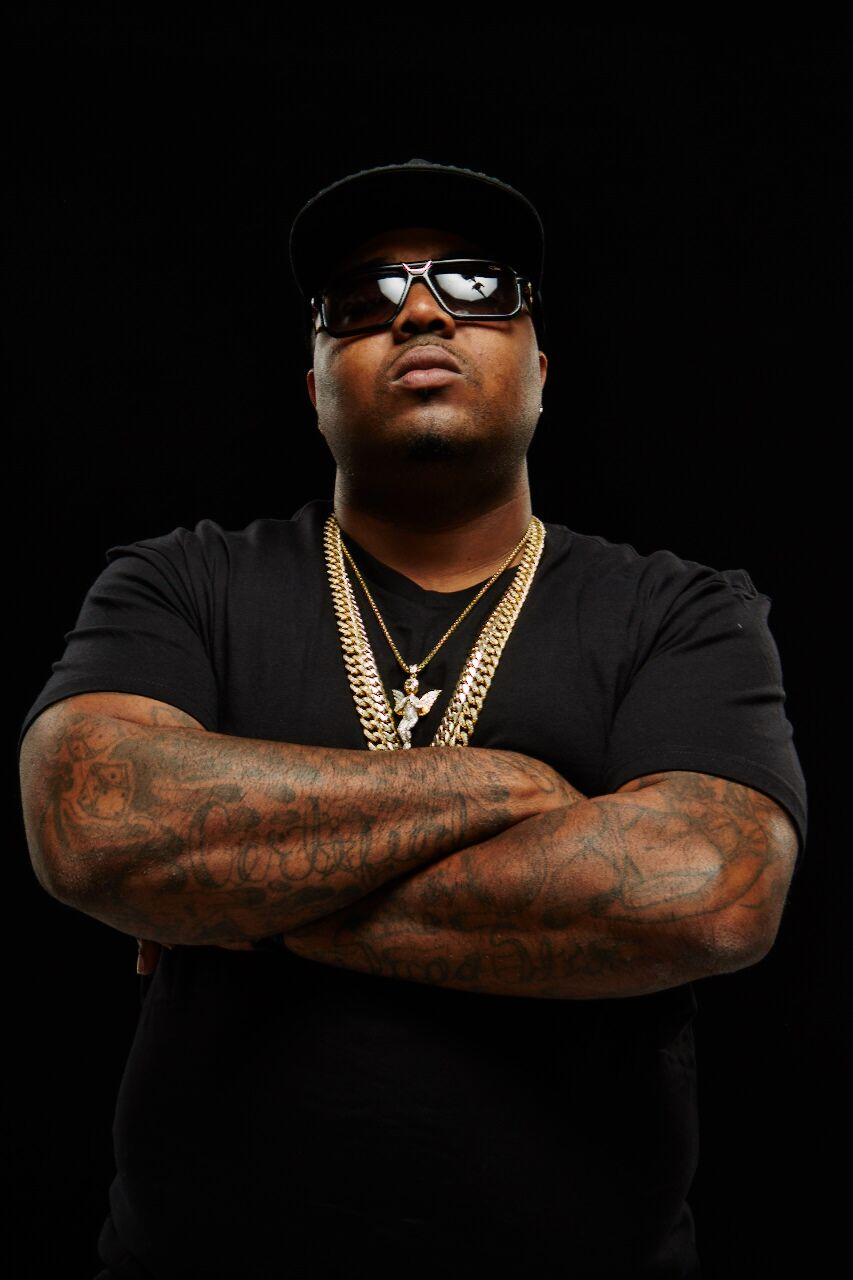
- Chedda Da Connect in 2015

Background information
- Also known as: Chedda da Connect; Mr. Flicka Da Wrist
- Born: Courtney Allen Milburn; January 18, 1986 (age 40); Houston, Texas, U.S.
- Genres: Southern hip-hop; trap
- Occupations: Rapper; singer; songwriter
- Years active: 2015–present
- Labels: We Run It; E1

Courtney Allen Milburn (born January 18, 1986), better known by his stage name Chedda da Connect, is an American rapper, singer, and record executive from Houston, Texas. He is best known for his 2015 single "Flicka da Wrist", which peaked at number 94 on the Billboard Hot 100 after gaining virality on the now-defunct social media platform Vine. Since then, Milburn has founded the Houston-based record label We Run It, through which he signed then-unknown hometown native, rapper Don Toliver in 2017.

== Career ==
In 2015, Chedda Da Connect's single "Flicka Da Wrist" which went viral online. The single, which was released March 3, 2015, has been remixed by numerous rap artists such as Fetty Wap, 2 Chainz, Migos, Soulja Boy, T.I., Rick Ross, Kevin Gates and many more. The song became a popular meme on Vine, with characters such as Spider-Man and Squidward (from 'SpongeBob SquarePants') "dancing" to the song in short clips. It has been supported on social media by numerous celebrities; Tyga posted a Snapchat of he and Justin Bieber dancing to it at Rihanna's Met Ball party in May, Rihanna herself uploaded a video vine singing the song and doing the songs dance, LeBron James and his Cleveland Cavaliers who in a YouTube video was seen celebrating after a win to the song, Justin Bieber who uploaded a video of himself cooking to the song, and Drake taught his mother how to do the "Flicka Da Wrist" dance. The song entered the Billboard chart's weeks after gaining online popularity, largely on the strength of its streaming activity and digital download sales. An official "Flicka Da Wrist Remix" was released in June 2015 and featured Fetty Wap, Boosie Badazz, Yo Gotti and Boston George.

Chedda Da Connect signed with eOne Entertainment in 2015. He founded the record label We Run It Entertainment the same year, signing himself and fellow Houston rappers T-Wayne and Don Toliver.

== Projects ==
Chedda Da Connect released his debut mixtape, Chedda World in May 2015. It features appearances from T-Wayne and Kirko Bangz, with production from Zaytoven, Sy Ari Da Kid, and Fred On Em.

== Discography ==
=== Albums ===
- Chedda World (2014)
- Catchin' Playz (2014)
- Catchin' Playz 2 (2014)
- Chedda World: The Album (2015)

=== Singles ===
| Title | Year | Peak chart positions | | Album |
| Title | Year | US | US R&B | Album |
|---|---|---|---|---|
| "Flicka Da Wrist" | 2015 | 94 | 29 | Chedda World: The Album |
