= Offset discography =

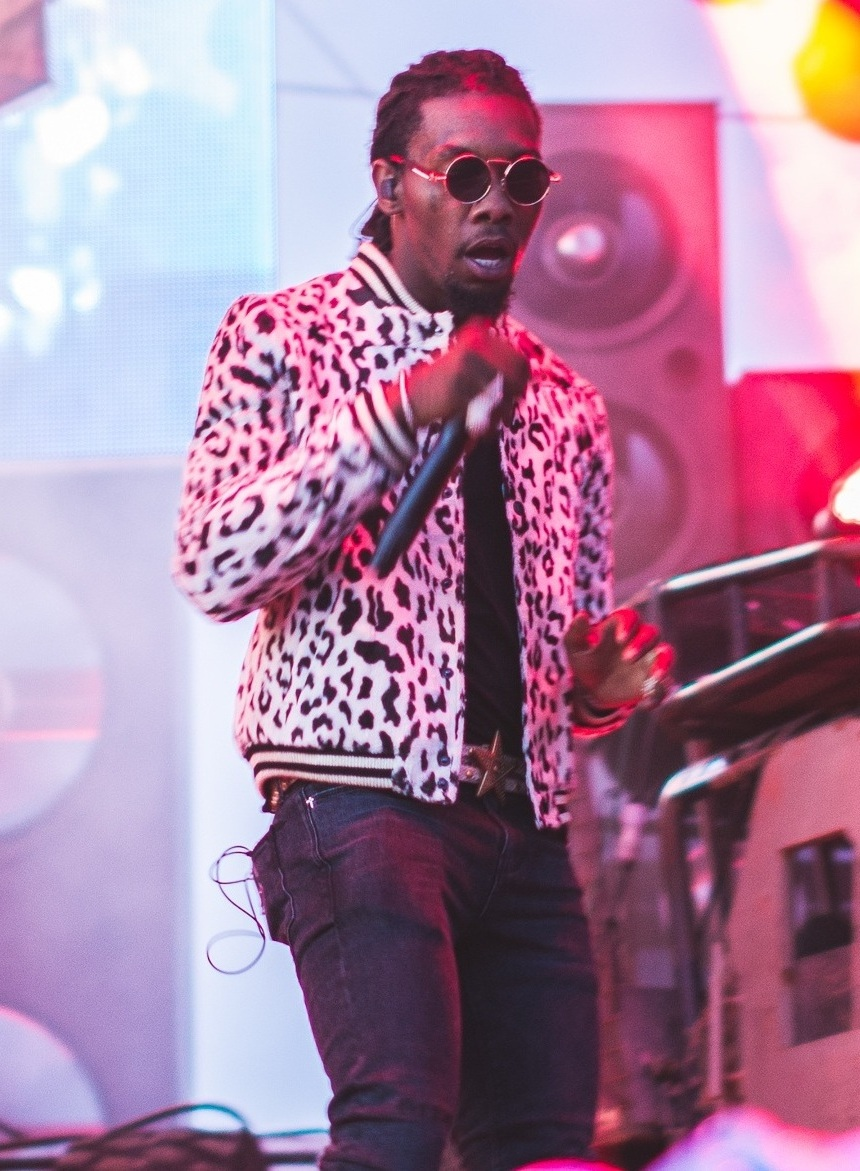
- Offset in 2017
- Studio albums: 3
- EPs: 2
- Mixtapes: 1
- Singles: 26
- Collaborative albums: 1

American rapper Offset has released three studio albums, one collaborative album, one mixtape, two compilation albums, two extended plays, and 26 singles (including 24 as a featured artist). In 2017, he released his collaborative studio album, Without Warning, in collaboration with fellow Atlanta-based rapper 21 Savage and American record producer Metro Boomin. The album entered at number four on the US Billboard 200. The album spawned the single, "Ric Flair Drip", which has been certified six-times platinum by the Recording Industry Association of America (RIAA).

== Albums ==
=== Studio albums ===
List of studio albums, with selected chart positions, and certifications
Title	Album details	Peak chart positions										Certifications
Title	Album details	US	US R&B/ HH	US Rap	AUS	CAN	DEN	FRA	IRE	NZ	UK	Certifications
Father of 4	Released: February 22, 2019; Label: Quality Control, Motown; Format: CD, LP, digital download, streaming	4	2	2	18	3	12	35	20	19	19	RIAA: Gold
Set It Off	Released: October 13, 2023; Label: Motown; Format: CD, LP, digital download, streaming	5	2	2	58	10	22	24	—	17	62	
Kiari	Released: August 22, 2025; Label: Motown; Format: CD, LP, digital download, streaming	16	5	4	88	53	—	—	—	—	—	
GMFU	Scheduled: November 13, 2026; Label: TBA; Format: TBA	TBA										
"—" denotes a recording that did not chart or was not released in that territory.

=== Collaborative albums ===
List of collaborative studio albums, with selected chart positions, and certifications
Title	Album details	Peak chart positions									Certifications
Title	Album details	US	US R&B/ HH	US Rap	AUS	CAN	DEN	FRA	NZ	UK	Certifications
Without Warning (with 21 Savage and Metro Boomin)	Released: October 31, 2017; Label: Slaughter Gang, Epic, Quality Control, Motown, Capitol, Boominati Worldwide, Republic; Format: Digital download, streaming	4	2	1	39	5	8	76	15	41	BPI: Silver; IFPI DEN: Platinum

=== Compilation albums ===
Title	Album details
Quality Control: Control the Streets, Volume 1 (as part of Quality Control)	Released: December 8, 2017; Label: Quality Control, Capitol, Motown; Formats: CD, digital download, streaming
Quality Control: Control the Streets, Volume 2 (as part of Quality Control)	Released: August 16, 2019; Label: Quality Control, Motown; Formats: CD, digital download, streaming

== Mixtapes ==
Title	Mixtape details
Haunted by Fame	Released: October 31, 2025; Label: Motown; Format: Digital download, streaming

== Extended plays ==
Title	EP details
$uave	Released: 2017; Label: Self-released; Format: Digital download
Culture III (Offset's Way)	Released: June 14, 2021; Label: YRN the Label, Quality Control, Capitol, Motown; Format: Digital download, streaming

== Singles ==
=== As lead artist ===
List of singles as a solo artist, showing year released and album name
Title	Year	Peak chart positions								Certifications	Album
Title	Year	US	US R&B/HH	US Rap	AUS	CAN	NZ Hot	UK	WW	Certifications	Album
"Alive" (with Lil Jon and 2 Chainz)	2018	—	—	—	—	—	—	—	—	RIAA: Gold	Non-album single
"Ric Flair Drip" (with Metro Boomin)	2018	13	9	6	61	13	—	67	—	RIAA: 6× Platinum; BPI: Platinum; MC: 4× Platinum; RMNZ: 5× Platinum	Without Warning
"Red Room"	2019	49	22	21	—	12	42	98	—	RIAA: Platinum	Father of 4
"Power Moves" (with Lost God)	2019	—	—	—	—	—	—	—	—		Non-album single
"Clout" (featuring Cardi B)	2019	39	25	24	—	22	41	64	—	RIAA: 3× Platinum; BPI: Silver; RMNZ: Platinum	Father of 4
"Soakin Wet" (with Quality Control and Marlo featuring City Girls)	2019	—	—	—	—	—	—	—	—		Control the Streets, Volume 2
"Up the Smoke" (with Stunna 4 Vegas)	2019	—	—	—	—	—	—	—	—		Rich Youngin
"Shoot My Shot" (with IDK)	2021	—	—	—	—	—	—	—	—		USee4Yourself
"Como Tu (Dirty)" (with Chesca and De La Ghetto)	2021	—	—	—	—	—	—	—	—		Non-album single
"New to You" (with Calvin Harris, Normani, and Tinashe)	2022	—	—	—	—	—	15	—	—		Funk Wav Bounces Vol. 2
"Big 14" (with Trippie Redd featuring Moneybagg Yo)	2022	96	37	—	95	—	13	—	—		Non-album singles
"54321"	2022	88	25	21	—	—	—	—	—		Non-album singles
"Code" (with Moneybagg Yo)	2022	— (Note: "Code" did not enter the Billboard Hot 100, but peaked at number 12 on the Bubbling Under Hot 100 Singles chart.)	42	—	—	—	—	—	—		Non-album singles
"2 Live" (with Hit-Boy)	2023	—	—	—	—	—	—	—	—		Non-album singles
"Jealousy" (with Cardi B)	2023	55	26	24	—	—	19	—	144		Set It Off
"Fan"	2023	— (Note: "Fan" did not enter the Billboard Hot 100, but peaked at number 10 on the Bubbling Under Hot 100 Singles chart.)	49	—	—	—	—	—	—		Set It Off
"Worth It" (with Don Toliver)	2023	90	29	—	—	74	4	52	128	RIAA: Gold	Set It Off
"Say My Grace" (featuring Travis Scott)	2023	48	13	8	—	30	3	49	63	RIAA: Gold	Set It Off
"Style Rare" (with Gunna)	2024	—	49	—	—	—	38	—	—		Non-album single
"Swing My Way"	2024	—	—	—	—	—	—	—	—		Kiari:Offset
"Ten"	2025	—	—	—	—	—	—	—	—		Non-album single
"Bodies" (with JID)	2025	72	18	11	—	99	16	—	—		Kiari
"Professional"	2025	—	—	—	—	—	39	—	—		Kiari
"Every Night" (featuring Don Toliver)	2026	—	32	23	—	—	35	—	—		Non-album single
"—" denotes a recording that did not chart or was not released in that territory.

=== As featured artist ===
List of singles as a featured artist, showing year released and album name
Title	Year	Peak chart positions					Certifications	Album
Title	Year	US	US R&B/HH	US Rap	CAN	UK	Certifications	Album
"Cash Talk" (Figg Panamera featuring Young Thug and Offset)	2014	—	—	—	—	—		The Independent Game
"Trap Back" (Johnny Cinco featuring Offset and YFN Kay)	2014	—	—	—	—	—		Non-album singles
"Know Bout Me" (Peewee Longway featuring Young Thug and Offset)	2014	—	—	—	—	—		Non-album singles
"Extortion" (Peewee Longway featuring Offset)	2015	—	—	—	—	—		Money, Pounds, Ammunition 2
"Life Line" (DJ Spinatik and Big Bank Black featuring Quavo and Offset)	2016	—	—	—	—	—		Non-album single
"Big Money" (Made Man featuring Offset)	2016	—	—	—	—	—		Made 4 It
"Large Bag" (Fly Ty featuring Offset and Jadakiss)	2016	—	—	—	—	—		My Life Your, Entertainment
"Headlock" (Cousin Stizz featuring Offset)	2017	—	—	—	—	—		One Night Only
"Water Leak" (Philthy Rich featuring Lil Uzi Vert, Sauce Walka, and Offset)	2017	—	—	—	—	—		Non-album single
"No Complaints" (Metro Boomin featuring Offset and Drake)	2017	71	31	22	51	—	RIAA: Platinum; ARIA: Gold; MC: 2× Platinum; RMNZ: Gold	Not All Heroes Wear Capes
"Wedding Crashers" (Aminé featuring Offset)	2017	—	—	—	—	—		Good for You
"Flood Watch" (Juicy J featuring Offset)	2017	—	—	—	—	—		Rubba Band Business
"No Flag" (London on da Track featuring Nicki Minaj, 21 Savage, and Offset)	2017	—	—	—	—	—		Non-album single
"With Vengeance" (Ski Mask the Slump God featuring Offset)	2017	—	—	—	—	—		Beware the Book of Eli
"Willy Wonka" (Macklemore featuring Offset)	2017	—	—	—	—	—		Gemini
"Patek Water" (Future and Young Thug featuring Offset)	2017	50	17	12	39	89	RIAA: Gold	Super Slimey
"Boss Life" (YFN Lucci featuring Offset)	2017	—	—	—	—	—		Ray Ray from Summerhill
"No Drama" (Tinashe featuring Offset)	2018	— (Note: "No Drama" did not enter the Billboard Hot 100, but peaked at number 23 on the Bubbling Under Hot 100 Singles chart.)	— (Note: "No Drama" did not enter the Hot R&B/Hip-Hop Songs chart, but peaked at number two on the Bubbling Under R&B/Hip-Hop Singles chart.)	—	—	—		Joyride
"Ahora Dice (Remix)" (Chris Jedi, J Balvin, and Ozuna featuring Cardi B, Anuel AA, Arcángel, and Offset)	2018	— (Note: "Ahora Dice (Remix)" did not enter the Billboard Hot 100, but peaked at number 4 on the Bubbling Under Hot 100 Singles chart.)	—	—	—	—		Non-album single
"Proud" (2 Chainz featuring YG and Offset)	2018	96	43	—	—	—	RIAA: Gold	The Play Don't Care Who Makes It
"Wait" (Chantel Jeffries featuring Offset and Vory)	2018	—	—	—	—	—		Non-album single
"Taste" (Tyga featuring Offset)	2018	8	7	6	9	5	RIAA: Diamond; BPI: 2× Platinum; FIMI: Platinum; RMNZ: 5× Platinum; SNEP: Gold	Legendary
"Who Want the Smoke?" (Lil Yachty featuring Cardi B and Offset)	2018	— (Note: "Who Want the Smoke?" did not enter the Billboard Hot 100, but peaked at number nine on the Bubbling Under Hot 100 Singles chart.)	— (Note: "Who Want the Smoke?" did not enter the Hot R&B/Hip-Hop Songs chart, but peaked at number five on the Bubbling Under R&B/Hip-Hop Singles chart.)	—	—	—	RIAA: Gold	Nuthin' 2 Prove
"Zeze" (Kodak Black featuring Travis Scott and Offset)	2018	2	1	1	1	7	RIAA: 6× Platinum; BPI: Platinum; RMNZ: 3× Platinum	Dying to Live
"Hurts Like Hell" (Madison Beer featuring Offset)	2018	—	—	—	—	—	RMNZ: Gold	Non-album single
"Do Not Disturb" (Smokepurpp and Murda Beatz featuring Offset and Lil Yachty)	2018	—	—	—	—	—	RIAA: Gold	Bless Yo Trap
"Enzo" (DJ Snake and Sheck Wes featuring Offset, 21 Savage, and Gucci Mane)	2019	—	—	—	—	—		Carte Blanche
"Bussdown" (Blueface featuring Offset)	2019	—	—	—	—	—		Dirt Bag
"Baby Sitter" (DaBaby featuring Offset)	2019	59	28	—	—	—	RIAA: Platinum	Baby on Baby
"Let's Get Married" (Yellow Claw featuring Offset and Era Istrefi)	2019	—	—	—	—	—		Never Dies
"Had Enough" (Don Toliver featuring Quavo and Offset)	2020	52	23	19	42	60	RIAA: Gold; RMNZ: Gold	JackBoys
"2 Seater" (YBN Nahmir featuring G-Eazy and Offset)	2020	—	—	—	—	—		Visionland
"Rocking a Cardigan in Atlanta" (Lil Shordie Scott featuring Offset)	2022	—	—	—	—	—		Non-album singles
"Step 1" (SleazyWorld Go featuring Offset)	2022	— (Note: "Step 1" did not enter the Billboard Hot 100, but peaked at number 22 on the Bubbling Under Hot 100 Singles chart.)	50	—	—	—		Non-album singles
"Sadio" (Hamza featuring Offset)	2023	—	—	—	—	—	SNEP : Gold	Sincèrement
"Prada Dem" (Gunna featuring Offset)	2024	54	20	15	60	—		One of Wun
"Away" (Quavo featuring Offset)	2026	—	—	—	—	—		Qrömelife
"—" denotes a recording that did not chart or was not released in that territory.

== Other charted and certified songs ==
List of songs, with selected chart positions, showing year released and album name
Title	Year	Peak chart positions								Certifications	Album
Title	Year	US	US R&B /HH	US Rap	AUS	CAN	NZ	UK	WW	Certifications	Album
"Guwop" (Young Thug featuring Quavo, Offset, and Young Scooter)	2016	— (Note: "Guwop" did not enter the Billboard Hot 100, but peaked at number ten on the Bubbling Under Hot 100 Singles chart.)	45	—	—	—	—	—	—	RIAA: Platinum; MC: Gold	Jeffery
"Met Gala" (Gucci Mane featuring Offset)	2017	88	37	—	—	93	—	—	—	RIAA: Platinum	Droptopwop
"Lick (Remix)" (Cardi B featuring Offset)	2017	— (Note: "Lick" did not enter the Billboard Hot 100, but peaked at number 17 on the Bubbling Under Hot 100 Singles chart.)	— (Note: "Lick" did not enter the Hot R&B/Hip-Hop Songs chart, but peaked at number one on the Bubbling Under R&B/Hip-Hop Singles chart.)	—	—	—	—	—	—		Gangsta Bitch Music, Vol. 2
"Minute" (Nav and Metro Boomin featuring Playboi Carti and Offset)	2017	— (Note: "Minute" did not enter the Billboard Hot 100, but peaked at number 21 on the Bubbling Under Hot 100 Singles chart.)	— (Note: "Minute" did not enter the Hot R&B/Hip-Hop Songs chart, but peaked at number four on the Bubbling Under R&B/Hip-Hop Singles chart.)	—	—	76	—	—	—	RIAA: Platinum; MC: Platinum	Perfect Timing
"Built My Legacy" (Kodak Black featuring Offset)	2017	— (Note: "Built My Legacy" did not enter the Billboard Hot 100, but peaked at number 11 on the Bubbling Under Hot 100 Singles chart.)	— (Note: "Built My Legacy" did not enter the Hot R&B/Hip-Hop Songs chart, but peaked at number one on the Bubbling Under R&B/Hip-Hop Singles chart.)	—	—	—	—	—	—		Project Baby 2
"Ghostface Killers" (with 21 Savage and Metro Boomin featuring Travis Scott)	2017	35	14	13	69	14	—	60	—	RIAA: Platinum; BPI: Silver; MC: Platinum; RMNZ: Gold	Without Warning
"Rap Saved Me" (with 21 Savage and Metro Boomin featuring Quavo)	2017	64	26	21	—	46	—	—	—	RIAA: Platinum	Without Warning
"Nightmare" (with Metro Boomin)	2017	100	43	—	—	72	—	—	—		Without Warning
"Mad Stalkers" (with 21 Savage and Metro Boomin)	2017	99	42	—	—	77	—	—	—	RIAA: Gold	Without Warning
"Disrespectful" (with 21 Savage and Metro Boomin)	2017	— (Note: "Disrespectful" did not enter the Billboard Hot 100, but peaked at number four on the Bubbling Under Hot 100 Singles chart.)	48	—	—	87	—	—	—		Without Warning
"Still Serving" (with 21 Savage and Metro Boomin)	2017	— (Note: "Still Serving" did not enter the Billboard Hot 100, but peaked at number 14 on the Bubbling Under Hot 100 Singles chart.)	— (Note: "Still Serving" did not enter the Hot R&B/Hip-Hop Songs chart, but peaked at number 10 on the Bubbling Under R&B/Hip-Hop Singles chart.)	—	—	—	—	—	—		Without Warning
"Dubai Shit" (Huncho Jack featuring Offset)	2017	83	35	—	—	63	—	—	—		Huncho Jack, Jack Huncho
"Mickey" (Lil Yachty featuring Offset and Lil Baby)	2018	— (Note: "Mickey" did not enter the Billboard Hot 100, but peaked at number seven on the Bubbling Under Hot 100 Singles chart.)	— (Note: "Mickey" did not enter the Hot R&B/Hip-Hop Songs chart, but peaked at number two on the Bubbling Under R&B/Hip-Hop Singles chart.)	—	—	79	—	—	—	RIAA: Gold	Lil Boat 2
"Lost It" (Rich the Kid featuring Quavo and Offset)	2018	— (Note: "Lost It" did not enter the Billboard Hot 100, but peaked at number four on the Bubbling Under Hot 100 Singles chart.)	— (Note: "Lost It" did not enter the Hot R&B/Hip-Hop Songs chart, but peaked at number two on the Bubbling Under R&B/Hip-Hop Singles chart.)	—	—	91	—	—	—	RIAA: Gold	The World Is Yours
"Startender" (A Boogie wit da Hoodie featuring Offset and Tyga)	2018	59	21	19	—	46	― (Note: "Startender" did not enter the NZ Top 40 Singles Chart, but peaked at number 16 on the NZ Hot Singles Chart.)	84	—	RIAA: Platinum; RMNZ: Gold	Hoodie SZN
"Father of 4" (featuring Big Rube)	2019	— (Note: "Father of 4" did not enter the Billboard Hot 100, but peaked at number 17 on the Bubbling Under Hot 100 Singles chart.)	—	—	—	—	—	—	—		Father of 4
"How Did I Get Here" (featuring J. Cole)	2019	65	30	—	—	72	― (Note: "How Did I Get Here" did not enter the NZ Top 40 Singles Chart, but peaked at number 17 on the NZ Hot Singles Chart.)	—	—	RIAA: Gold	Father of 4
"Lick"	2019	86	41	—	—	78	― (Note: "Lick" did not enter the NZ Top 40 Singles Chart, but peaked at number 16 on the NZ Hot Singles Chart.)	—	—		Father of 4
"Tats on My Face"	2019	— (Note: "Tats on My Face" did not enter the Billboard Hot 100, but peaked at number 21 on the Bubbling Under Hot 100 Singles chart.)	—	—	—	—	—	—	—		Father of 4
"Wild Wild West" (featuring Gunna)	2019	— (Note: "Tats on My Face" did not enter the Billboard Hot 100, but peaked at number four on the Bubbling Under Hot 100 Singles chart.)	—	—	—	—	—	—	—		Father of 4
"Don't Lose Me"	2019	— (Note: "Don't Lose Me" did not enter the Billboard Hot 100, but peaked at number 25 on the Bubbling Under Hot 100 Singles chart.)	—	—	—	—	—	—	—		Father of 4
"Legacy" (featuring Travis Scott and 21 Savage)	2019	49	22	21	—	51	― (Note: "Legacy" did not enter the NZ Top 40 Singles Chart, but peaked at number eight on the NZ Hot Singles Chart.)	—	—	RIAA: Platinum	Father of 4
"Bouncin'" (Kiana Ledé featuring Offset)	2019	—	—	—	—	—	—	—	—	RMNZ: Gold	Myself
"Rich" (The Plug featuring D-Block Europe and Offset)	2019	—	—	—	—	—	—	53	—	BPI: Silver	Plug Talk
"Pink Toes" (with Quality Control and DaBaby featuring Gunna)	2019	—	— (Note: "Pink Toes" did not enter the Hot R&B/Hip-Hop Songs chart, but peaked at number seven on the Bubbling Under R&B/Hip-Hop Singles chart.)	—	—	—	—	—	—		Control the Streets, Volume 2
"Cap" (KSI featuring Offset)	2020	—	—	—	—	—	—	24	—		Dissimulation
"Run It Up" (Lil Tjay featuring Offset and Moneybagg Yo)	2021	50	26	19	—	26	― (Note: "Run It Up" did not enter the NZ Top 40 Singles Chart, but peaked at number eight on the NZ Hot Singles Chart.)	63	51	RIAA: Platinum; BPI: Silver; RMNZ: Gold	Destined 2 Win
"Annihilate" (with Metro Boomin, Swae Lee, and Lil Wayne)	2023	44	14	9	33	23	34	59	30	ARIA: Gold	Spider-Man: Across the Spider-Verse (Soundtrack from and Inspired by the Motion Picture)
"Danger (Spider)" (with JID)	2023	95	35	25	—	80	—	—	185		Spider-Man: Across the Spider-Verse (Soundtrack from and Inspired by the Motion Picture)
"Silk & Cologne" (with Ei8ht)	2023	— (Note: "Silk & Cologne" did not enter the Billboard Hot 100, but peaked at number 18 on the Bubbling Under Hot 100 Singles chart.)	—	—	—	86	—	—	—		Spider-Man: Across the Spider-Verse (Soundtrack from and Inspired by the Motion Picture)
"On the River"	2023	— (Note: "On the River" did not enter the Billboard Hot 100, but peaked at number 24 on the Bubbling Under Hot 100 Singles chart.)	—	—	—	—	— (Note: "On the River" did not enter the NZ Top 40 Singles Chart, but peaked at number 32 on the NZ Hot Singles Chart.)	—	—		Set It Off
"Broad Day" (with Future)	2023	— (Note: "Broad Day" did not enter the Billboard Hot 100, but peaked at number eight on the Bubbling Under Hot 100 Singles chart.)	49	—	—	—	— (Note: "Broad Day" did not enter the NZ Top 40 Singles Chart, but peaked at number 23 on the NZ Hot Singles Chart.)	—	—		Set It Off
"Climate" (with BigXthaPlug)	2023	—	48	—	—	—	—	—	—		The Biggest
"Celebrate" (with Juice Wrld)	2024	— (Note: "Celebrate" did not enter the Billboard Hot 100, but peaked at number two on the Bubbling Under Hot 100 Singles chart.)	31	—	—	—	—	—	—		The Party Never Ends
"At My Purest" (Gunna featuring Offset)	2025	72	18	11	—	—	— (Note: "At My Purest" did not enter the NZ Top 40 Singles Chart, but peaked at number 20 on the NZ Hot Singles Chart.)	—	—		The Last Wun
"Pills" (with YoungBoy Never Broke Again)	2025	—	35	—	—	—	—	—	—		Kiari
"Different Species" (with Gunna)	2025	73	13	7	—	90	—	—	183		Kiari
"Run It Up" (with Key Glock)	2025	—	32	25	—	—	—	—	—		Kiari
"—" denotes a recording that did not chart or was not released in that territory.

== Guest appearances ==
List of non-single guest appearances, with other performing artists, showing year released and album name
Title	Year	Other artist(s)	Album
"I'm Havin"	2014	Skippa da Flippa	I'm Havin
"Of Course We Ghetto Flowers"	2014	Lil Uzi Vert, Playboi Carti	The Perfect Luv Tape
"Safe House"	2014	Skippa da Flippa, Rich the Kid	—N/a
"Start Dieing"	2014	21 Savage	The Slaughter Tape
"Type Of Party"	2015	Jeezy, DJ Drama, Que, Peewee Longway	Gangsta Party
"Guwop"	2016	Young Thug, Quavo, Young Scooter	Jeffery
"Bachelor"	2016	ASAP Rocky, Lil Yachty, MadeinTYO	Cozy Tapes Vol. 1: Friends
"Life Line"	2016	DJ Spinatik, Big Bank Black, Quavo	—N/a
"Scorin'"	2016	Murda Beatz, Playboi Carti	Keep God First
"M&Ms"	2016	Murda Beatz, Blac Youngsta	Keep God First
"Lick"	2017	Cardi B	Gangsta Bitch Music, Vol. 2
"Met Gala"	2017	Gucci Mane	Droptopwop
"Rain Drop"	2017	T-Wayne	—N/a
"Checc"	2017	Dave East	Karma
"Hop in da Lamb"	2017	Sauce Walka	—N/a
"Minute"	2017	Nav, Metro Boomin, Playboi Carti	Perfect Timing
"With Vengeance"	2017	Ski Mask the Slump God	—N/a
"Built My Legacy"	2017	Kodak Black	Project Baby 2
"No Flags"	2017	London On Da Track, 21 Savage, Nicki Minaj	—N/a
"Patek Water"	2017	Future, Young Thug	Super Slimey
"Dubai Shit"	2017	Huncho Jack, Yung Lean	Huncho Jack, Jack Huncho
"Attention"	2018	Rich Brian	Amen
"Gummo (Remix)"	2018	6ix9ine	Day69
"Gargoyle"	2018	Rich the Kid, Swae Lee	The World Is Yours
"Baby Daddy"	2018	Lil Yachty, Lil Pump	Lil Boat 2
"Do Not Disturb"	2018	Smokepurpp, Murda Beatz, Lil Yachty	Bless Yo Trap
"Frostbite"	2018	Preme	Light of Day
"Shot Caller"	2018	Marlo, YFN Lucci	The Real 1
"Transporter"	2018	Lil Baby	Harder Than Ever
"Back On It"	2018	Zaytoven, Young Scooter	Trapholizay
"Show It"	2018	Zaytoven, Kodak Black, T.I.	Trapholizay
"RIP"	2018	YoungBoy Never Broke Again	Until Death Call My Name Reloaded
"Balenciaga Challenge"	2018	6lack	East Atlanta Love Letter
"Break the Bank"	2018	Young Dolph	Role Model
"On the Run"	2018	Young Thug	On the Rvn
"Realest in It"	2018	Lil Baby, Gucci Mane	Street Gossip
"Startender"	2018	A Boogie wit da Hoodie, Tyga	Hoodie SZN
"Unload"	2018	Duke Deuce	Memphis Massacre
"Cash App"	2019	Dreezy	Big Dreez
"Fasho Fasho"	2019	Lil Pump	Harverd Dropout
"Move It"	2019	Lil Keed	—N/a
"Babysitter"	2019	DaBaby	Baby on Baby
"4th of July"	2019	Stunna 4 Vegas	BIG 4x
"Two Cups"	2019	Rich The Kid, Big Sean	The World Is Yours 2
"Worryin' Bout Me"	2019	BJ The Chicago Kid	—N/a
"Style Ain't Free"	2019	Moneybagg Yo	43va Heartless
"Soakin Wet"	2019	Marlo, City Girls	—N/a
"Cap"	2020	KSI	Dissimulation
"Como Tu (Dirty)"	2021	Chesca, De La Ghetto	—N/a
"Hit Em Hard"	2021	Trippie Redd, Lil Durk, Kevin Gates, King Von	F9
"Chrome Hearts"	2021	D-Block Europe	Home Alone 2
"Bouncy"	2022	Shenseea	Alpha
"Rocking a Cardigan in Atlanta"	2022	Lil Shordie Scott	—N/a
"Pain & Strife"	2022	Freddie Gibbs	$oul $old $eparately
"Bulletproof Maybach"	2022	DDG	It's Not Me It's You (Deluxe)
"How Many"	2023	Lil Keed	Keed Talk to 'Em 2
"Annihilate"	2023	Metro Boomin, Swae Lee, Lil Wayne	Spider-Man: Across the Spider-Verse (Soundtrack from and Inspired by the Motion Picture)
"Danger (Spider)"	2023	JID	Spider-Man: Across the Spider-Verse (Soundtrack from and Inspired by the Motion Picture)
"Silk & Cologne"	2023	Ei8ht	Spider-Man: Across the Spider-Verse (Soundtrack from and Inspired by the Motion Picture)
"Andale"	2023	DJ Drama, Moneybagg Yo	I'M REALLY LIKE THAT
"G63"	2024	Polo G	Hood Poet
"Celebrate"	2024	Juice Wrld	The Party Never Ends
"Not In The Mood"	2024	Rich The Kid	Life's a Gamble
"Do What You Want"	2025	DDG	Blame The Chat
"At My Purest"	2025	Gunna	The Last Wun

== See also ==
- Migos discography
- Quavo discography
- Takeoff discography
