= Step 1 (song) =

Single by SleazyWorld Go and Offset

Single by SleazyWorld Go featuring Offset
- Released: June 17, 2022
- Length: 2:17
- Label: SleazyWorld, Island
- Songwriters: Joseph Isaac; Kiari Cephus; Robert McCoy Jr.
- Producer: Rage Santana

SleazyWorld Go singles chronology
"Sleazy Flow (Remix)" (2022)	"Step 1" (2022)	"India Me" (2022)

Offset singles chronology
"Cake" (2022)	"Step 1" (2022)	"New to You" (2022)

Music video
- "Step 1" on YouTube

"Step 1" is a song by American rappers SleazyWorld Go and Offset. It was released on June 17, 2022 and was produced by Rage Santana. The song gained attention on the video-sharing app TikTok.

== Background ==
In an interview with Billboard, SleazyWorld Go spoke about his collaboration of the song: "Offset actually reached out to me. He likes my music and believes in my sound. He thinks I'm next up and I fuck with whoever fuck with me. I fuck with Offset. It was my record at first, but he liked it and heard it from a TikTok I did. He wanted to hop on there."

SleazyWorld previewed the song on social media before its release. The song gained significant traction on TikTok, where it gave rise to a trend of its own.

== Charts ==
Chart performance for "Step 1"
Chart (2022)	Peak position
US Bubbling Under Hot 100 (Billboard)	22
US Hot R&B/Hip-Hop Songs (Billboard)	50

=== Certifications ===
Region	Certification	Certified units/sales
United States (RIAA)	Gold	500,000^{‡}
^{‡} Sales+streaming figures based on certification alone.
