= SleazyWorld Go =

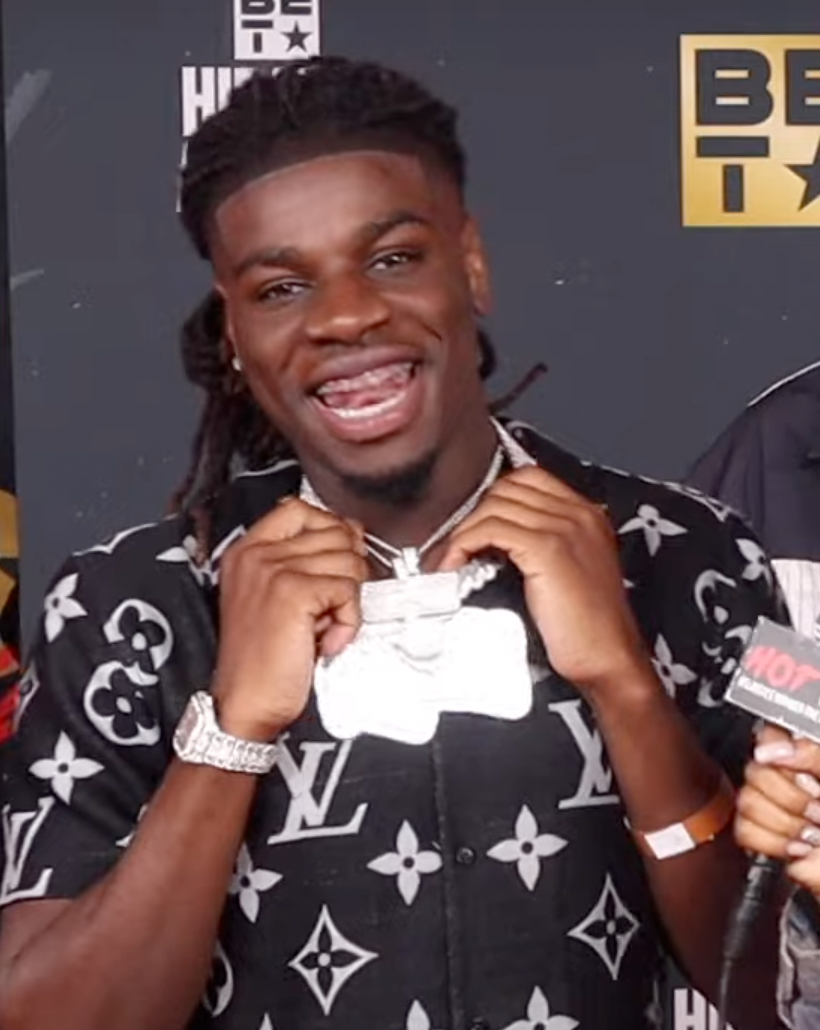
- SleazyWorld Go in October 2022

Background information
- Also known as: Sleazy
- Born: Joseph Daniel Isaac; January 17, 1998 (age 28); Grand Rapids, Michigan, U.S.
- Origin: Kansas City, Missouri, U.S.
- Genres: Midwestern hip-hop; trap; drill
- Occupations: Rapper; singer; songwriter
- Labels: Block Entertainment; Island

Joseph Daniel Isaac (born January 17, 1998), known professionally as SleazyWorld Go, is an American rapper, singer, and songwriter. He is best known for his 2022 single "Sleazy Flow", which peaked within the top 50 of the Billboard Hot 100 and spawned a remix featuring Lil Baby.

== Early life ==
SleazyWorld Go was born and raised in Grand Rapids, Michigan, and moved to Kansas City, Missouri as a teenager. His parents are from Haiti. According to the Michigan Department of Corrections, he pleaded guilty to armed robbery after an incident in 2015. In 2016, he was sentenced to four years in prison. He was released on parole in September 2019. He decided to take music seriously while incarcerated.

== Career ==
=== 2020–2022: Career beginnings ===
SleazyWorld Go first started rapping in 2020 following his release from prison. He first released "Sliding", and then started releasing more songs, such as "Baghdad Flow" and "What They Gone Do To Me".

SleazyWorld Go initially emerged following his Sleazy mixtape, which was released on September 12, 2021.

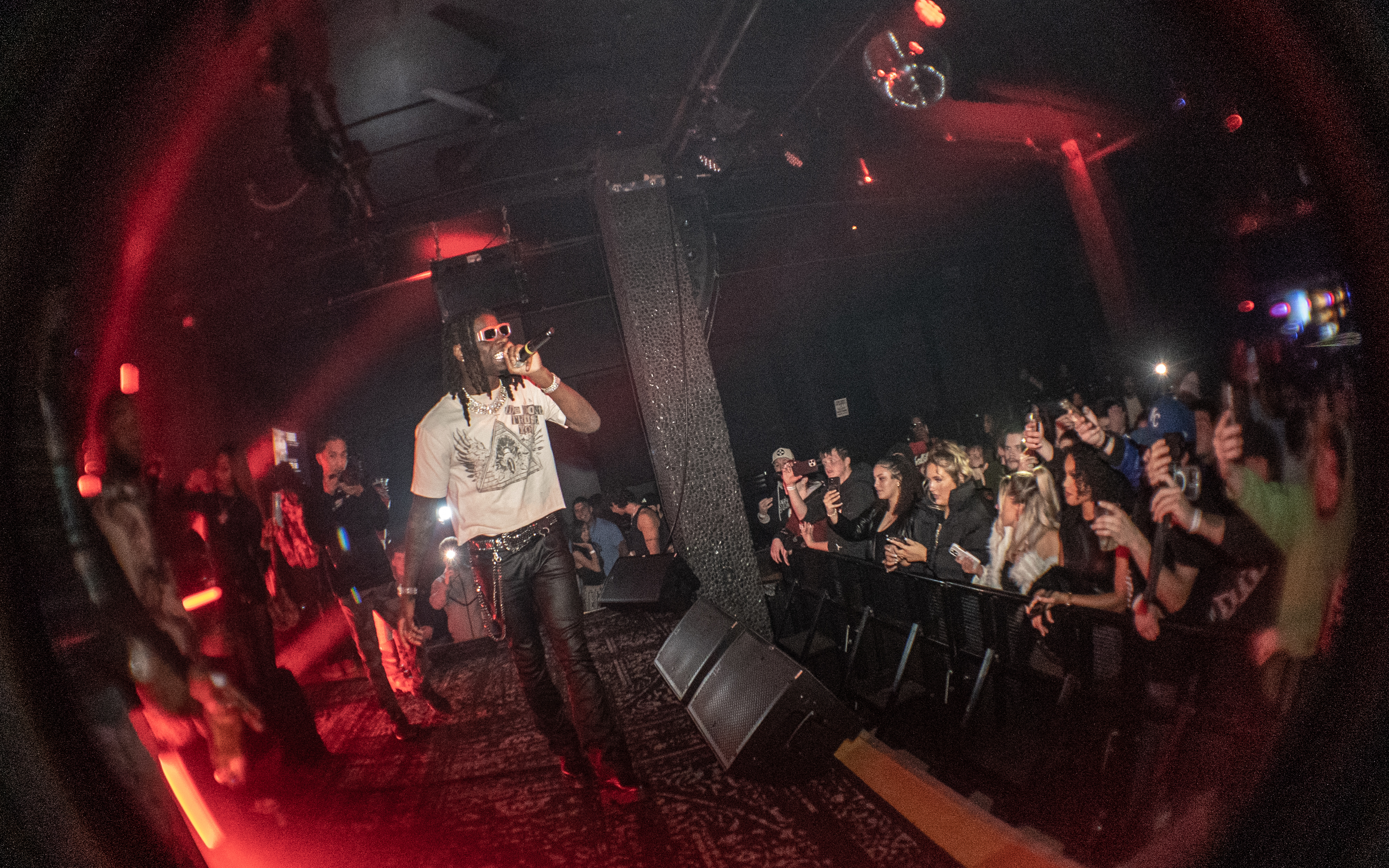
SleazyWorld Go - 1-30-26 - Performing at The Regency Live in Springfield Missouri

He released "Sleazy Flow" in 2021. It went viral in 2022, being used on the platform TikTok. It got remixed by rappers such as 30 Deep Grimeyy, Yungeen Ace, and NLE Choppa. However, an official remix with Lil Baby was released on May 26, 2022.

On June 17, 2022, he released a single called "Step 1" with rapper Offset.

=== 2022–present: Where the Shooters Be and Where the Shooters Be 2 ===
On November 11, 2022, SleazyWorld Go released his debut commercial mixtape Where the Shooters Be through SleazyWorld and Island Records. It was followed by a deluxe edition in February 2023 titled Where the Shooters Be 2. In June 2023, he was announced as part of the XXL 2023 Freshman Class.

On March 13, 2026, SleazyWorld Go was convicted of one count of a felon in possession of a firearm. He has a sentencing hearing on June 30, 2026. He faces up to 15 years in prison. That verdict was overturned and on October 28, 2026, he pleaded guilty to one count of a felon in possession of a firearm. He is set to be sentenced January 26, 2027.

== Discography ==
=== Studio albums ===
- More Than A Shooter (2024)

=== Mixtapes ===
List of mixtapes, with selected details and chart positions
Title	Details	Peak chart positions
Title	Details	US
Where the Shooters Be	Released: November 11, 2022; Label: SleazyWorld, Island; Formats: Digital download, streaming	151

=== Singles ===
List of singles as lead artist, with selected chart positions, showing year released and album name
Title	Year	Peak chart positions					Certifications	Album
Title	Year	US	US R&B/HH	CAN	NZ Hot	WW	Certifications	Album
"Sliding"	2020	—	—	—	—	—		Non-album singles
"Lit"	2020	—	—	—	—	—		Non-album singles
"Thug You"	2020	—	—	—	—	—		Non-album singles
"Sleazy Flow" (solo or featuring Lil Baby)	2021	47	9	98	35	139	RIAA: 4× Platinum; MC: Gold; RMNZ: Gold	Where the Shooters Be
"Baghad Flow"	2021	—	—	—	—	—		Non-album singles
"What They Gone Do to Me"	2022	—	—	—	—	—		Non-album singles
"Baghad Flow"	2022	—	—	—	—	—		Non-album singles
"Let Me Talk My Shit Part 3"	2022	—	—	—	—	—		Non-album singles
"Step 1" (with Offset)	2022	—	50	—	—	—	RIAA: Gold	Where the Shooters Be
"India Me	2022	—	—	—	—	—		Non-album single
"Creepers"	2022	—	—	—	—	—		Where the Shooters Be
"Glitches" (featuring G Herbo)	2022	—	—	—	—	—		Where the Shooters Be
"—" denotes a recording that did not chart or was not released in that territory.

== Awards and nominations ==
Award	Year	Nominee	Category	Result	Ref.
iHeartRadio Music Awards	2023	Himself	Best New Hip-hop Artist	Pending	
