= Big 14 =

2022 single by Trippie Redd and Offset featuring Moneybagg Yo

Single by Trippie Redd and Offset featuring Moneybagg Yo
- Released: August 5, 2022
- Recorded: 2018
- Genre: Trap; hardcore hip hop; gangsta rap
- Length: 4:07
- Label: 1400; 10K
- Songwriters: Michael White; Kiari Cephus; DeMario White Jr.; Carlton Mays, Jr.
- Producer: Honorable C.N.O.T.E.

Trippie Redd singles chronology
| "American Psycho" (2022) | "Big 14" (2022) | "Wrong Move" (2022) |

Offset singles chronology
| "New to You" (2022) | "Big 14" (2022) | "54321" (2022) |

Moneybagg Yo singles chronology
| "Supercharge" (2022) | "Big 14" (2022) | "Code" (2022) |

Music video
- "Big 14" on YouTube

"Big 14" is a song by American rappers Trippie Redd and Offset featuring fellow American rapper Moneybagg Yo. It was released on August 5, 2022, and produced by Honorable C.N.O.T.E.

== Background ==
The track was first previewed back in Trippie's LIFE’S A TRIP tour with Him stating that Lil Uzi Vert was on the song. Fast forward three years later in 2021 of March Offset would preview his in an Instagram story. A year later Trippie Redd teased the song in May 2022, by posting a video on social media of him listening to the song. Then a day after Moneybagg Yo would preview his verse during an Instagram Live.

== Composition ==
The song features "glitchy 808s" and "harrowing piano chords". In the lyrics, the three rappers brag about their wealth while also sending warnings and violent threats toward anyone who opposes them.

== Music video ==
A music video was released alongside the single. Directed by Nolan Riddle, it sees Trippie Redd, Offset and Moneybagg Yo rapping in various locations, such as near abandoned buildings, on rooftops and in front of a private jet.

== Charts ==
Chart performance for "Big 14"
| Chart (2022) | Peak position |
|---|---|
| Canada Hot 100 (Billboard) | 95 |
| New Zealand Hot Singles (RMNZ) | 13 |
| US Billboard Hot 100 | 96 |
| US Hot R&B/Hip-Hop Songs (Billboard) | 37 |
