= Point Me to the Slut's =

2022 single by FendiDa Rapper

Single by FendiDa Rappa
- Released: December 5, 2022
- Genre: Hip hop
- Length: 2:55 (original); 3:45 (remix)
- Label: Self-released (original); Giant Music (remix)
- Songwriters: Jessica Angelique Oliver; Belcalis Marlenis Almánzar Cephus (remix)
- Producer: Jordan Loud

FendiDa Rappa singles chronology
"SRT" (2022)	"Point Me to the Slut's" (2022)	"Cobain" (2023)

Remix cover
- Cover art of the remix with Cardi B

Cardi B singles chronology
"Put It on da Floor Again" (2023)	"Point Me 2" (2023)	"Jealousy" (2023)

Music video
- "Point Me 2" on YouTube

"Point Me to the Slut's" is a single by American rapper FendiDa Rappa, released on December 5, 2022. It became her breakout song through going viral on the video-sharing app TikTok. On July 7, 2023, the official remix of the song, titled "Point Me 2", with American rapper Cardi B was released. The remix became Fendi's first entry on the US Billboard Hot 100 at number 82.

== Background and release ==
In 2021, FendiDa Rappa released her debut project Str8 From da Raq. She followed this up with a series of standalone singles in 2022, including "Point Me to the Slut's", which was first released on December 5, 2022. The song went viral on the video-sharing app TikTok with over 150,000 posts as of 2023. After the success of "Point Me to the Slut's" on TikTok, the rapper signed a deal with the label Giant Music.

== Remix ==
An official remix of the song titled "Point Me 2" was released on July 7, 2023, with Cardi B, alongside an official video directed by Michelle Parker.

=== Composition ===
On the remix, Cardi B confidently boasts about her sexual prowess and ability to get a bag by any means and throws shade at her naysayers. She raps, “Like the Plan B didn't work, baby, I'm in this ho.” She references her 2020 number-one hit single "WAP" by saying "She playin' 'WAP', she throwin' cat in that Uber Black." Later, she shouts out singers Kehlani and Normani with the line, "One of my bitches like Kehlani, one look like Normani/Me and my n**** 'bout to flip 'em, we like Tip and Tiny."

=== Music video ===
An official music video directed by Michelle Parker was released simultaneously with the single's release. The video depicts FendiDa Rappa and Cardi B in a massage parlor vibing with other women, twerking, and mean-mugging through Chicago's streets. Groups of youth are shown dancing to the song, with special effects giving them glowing glasses, illuminating feet, and bullets shooting from their fingers.

=== Commercial performance ===
The remix debuted at number 82 on the Billboard Hot 100 with 7.3 million official streams and 4,000 downloads sold through July 13, according to Luminate. The track marked Fendi's first appearance on any Billboard charts.

=== Charts ===
Chart performance for "Point Me 2"
Chart (2023)	Peak position
US Billboard Hot 100	82
US Hot R&B/Hip-Hop Songs (Billboard)	20

=== Certifications ===
Certifications for "Point Me 2"
Region	Certification	Certified units/sales
United States (RIAA)	Gold	500,000^{‡}
^{‡} Sales+streaming figures based on certification alone.
