= Kiari =

Studio album by Offset
- Released: August 22, 2025
- Genre: Pop rap
- Length: 52:31
- Label: Motown
- Producers: Ayo Peeb; B100; Bodi; BoogzDaBeast; Cashmere Brown; Bryvn; Cadenza; Cassio; Cheeze Beatz; Da Honorable C.N.O.T.E.; DashOTB; DBTZ; Mike Dupree; Evrgrn; FnZ; France; Fridayy; Go Grizzly; Hendrix Smoke; HrtOnIce; Jambo; Jester; JRich Ent.; Jojokelete; K Rich; KevD; The Kii; LnK; London Jae; London on da Track; Loof; Macshooter49; Metro Boomin; Sean Momberger; Offset; Oz; Pooh Beatz; Quin with the Keys; Samuel Sanders; Shaun Lopez; Sk; Sonic; Sool Got Hits; Sucuki; Vinylz; Westen Weiss; World; X-Plosive; Ziggy

Offset chronology
Set It Off (2023)	Kiari (2025)	Haunted By Fame (2025)

Singles from Kiari
- 1. "Bodies" Released: June 20, 2025; 2. "Professional" Released: July 25, 2025

Kiari is the third studio album by American rapper Offset. It was released through Motown on August 22, 2025. The album features guest appearances from YoungBoy Never Broke Again, YFN Lucci, Gunna, JID, Key Glock, Teezo Touchdown, John Legend, and Ty Dolla Sign; its deluxe edition, Kiari: Offset, adds additional guest appearances from CeeLo Green, Drowning Pool and Bnyx. Production was handled by a variety of record producers, including London Jae, Go Grizzly, Metro Boomin, Oz and FnZ, among others. The album serves as the follow-up to Offset's previous album, Set It Off (2023).

== Videos ==
On August 27, 2025, Offset released music videos for each of the album's songs. The videos were all set in a therapist's office.

== Critical reception ==
Professional ratings
Review scores
Source	Rating
AllMusic	3.5/5 stars
Clash	7/10
Rolling Stone	4/5 stars

HotNewHipHop's review states that the album "doesn’t feel wholly liberating or conclusive" but that "it leans into his strengths—production choices, flow, and songwriting." Writing for Clash, Robin Murray described the album as a "curiously flawed, but often moving record." Will Dukes of Rolling Stone writes that the album "underscores Offset’s critical gifts, tapping into his chutzpah while demonstrating even more growth."

HotNewHipHop ranked the album as the 14th best of 2025.

== Track listing ==
Kiari track listing
No.	Title	Writer(s)	Producer(s)	Length
1.	"Enemies"	Kiari Cephus; Leland Wayne; Carlton Mays Jr.; Jaucquez Lowe; Jerel Nance	Metro Boomin; Da Honorable C.N.O.T.E.; London Jae	2:55
2.	"Pills" (featuring YoungBoy Never Broke Again)	Cephus; Kentrell Gaulden; Mathieu Gilbert; Kevin Richardson; Jordan Walker; Bennie Benjamin; Gloria Caldwell	HrtOnIce; K Rich	3:56
3.	"Professional"	Cephus; Walker; Amman Nurani; Patrick Bodi; Maximilian McFarlin; Dashiel Bryant	Offset; Evrgrn; Bodi; Macshooter49; DashOTB; JRich Ent.	2:57
4.	"Back in That Mode" (featuring YFN Lucci)	Cephus; Rayshawn Bennett; Lowe; Ladarius Byrd; Nance	London Jae; DBTZ	3:36
5.	"Different Species" (featuring Gunna)	Cephus; Sergio Kitchens; Thomas Kessler; Joseph McCue; Leon Krol; Walker; Florian Ongonga	X-Plosive; Jester; LnK; Flo^{[a]}	3:04
6.	"Bodies" (featuring JID)	Cephus; Destin Route; Anderson Hernandez; Michael Mulé; Isaac De Boni; Cashmere Brown; Jahmal Gwin; Michael Luce; Christian Pierce; David Williams; Stevie Benton	Vinylz; FnZ; Brown; BoogzDaBeast; Jwebby Muzik^{[v]}	2:58
7.	"Love You Down"	Cephus; Sean Momberger; London Holmes; Lowe; Melvin Riley, Jr.	Momberger; London on da Track; Hendrix Smoke	3:12
8.	"Run It Up" (featuring Key Glock)	Cephus; Markeyvius Cathey; Holmes; Gray Luvon; Mateen Niknam	London on da Track; Quin with the Keys; Ayo Peeb	3:14
9.	"Set It Off"	Cephus; Nance; Lowe; Kevin Price; Raul Bermejo; Samuel Martinez	London Jae; Go Grizzly; KevD; Jambo	1:40
10.	"Folgers"	Cephus; Mays; Lowe; Nance; Darryl Clemons	Da Honorable C.N.O.T.E.; London Jae	2:24
11.	"All of My Hoes"	Cephus; Nance; Lowe; Rasool Diaz; Timothy McKibbins; Morris Jones; Julius Rivera III	London Jae; Sool Got Hits; B100	2:47
12.	"Calories"	Cephus; Walker; Kessler; Johannes Kelete	X-Plosive; Jojokelete	2:42
13.	"Checkmate (Smooth)"	Cephus; Nance; Lowe; K. Price; Clemons; Oliver Rodigan	London Jae; Go Grizzly; Cadenza	3:19
14.	"Backends Fasho"	Cephus; Nance; Lowe; K. Price; Clemons; Bryan Yepes; Shaun Lopez	London Jae; Go Grizzly; Pooh Beatz; Bryvn; Lopez	2:29
15.	"Prada Myself" (featuring Teezo Touchdown)	Cephus; Aaron Thomas; Ozan Yildirim; Louis Leibfried; Michael Nowatzky; Jan Lilienthal; Tyler Cole; Tim Friedrich	Oz; Loof; Sucuki; The Kii	3:03
16.	"Never Let Go" (featuring John Legend)	Cephus; John Stephens; Francis LeBlanc; Samuel Sanders; Darryl McCorkell; Michael Dupree; Clemons; K. Price; Lowe; Nance; Walker	Fridayy; Sanders; Cheeze Beatz; Pooh Beatz; Go Grizzly; London Jae; Mike Dupree; France	2:42
17.	"Favorite Girl" (featuring Ty Dolla Sign)	Cephus; Nance; Tyrone Griffin Jr.; Westen Weiss; Cassio Lopes; Kevin Yancey; Deavon Chisolm; Eric Sandoval	Weiss; Cassio; Sonic	2:41
18.	"Move On"	Cephus; Nurani; Dustin Martin; Santiago Arias; Segrate Price; Walker	Evrgrn; Sk; World	2:44
Total length:				52:31

Kiari:Offset deluxe edition additional track listing
No.	Title	Writer(s)	Producer(s)	Length
19.	"Bodies" (Bnyx Mix; featuring JID, Drowning Pool, and Bnyx)	Cephus; Route; Hernandez; Mulé; De Boni; Brown; Gwin; Luce; Pierce; Williams; Benton; Benjamin Saint-Fort	Bnyx	3:13
20.	"Athlete"	Cephus; Walker; Nurani; Ethan Hayes	Evrgrn; Haze	2:38
21.	"History"	Cephus; Celeste Amajoyi; Terrel Dawes	Chibu Amajoyi; BatmanOnTheBeatz	2:01
22.	"How Did We Get Here?" (featuring CeeLo Green)	Cephus; Thomas Callaway; Brian Kennedy; Kingston Callaway; Sean Phelan	CeeLo Green; Kennedy; Phelan; K. Callaway	3:42
23.	"Swing My Way"	Cephus; Chandler Great	Turbo	2:59
Total length:				66:59

=== Notes ===
- ^{^[a]} indicates an additional producer.
- ^{^[v]} indicates a vocal producer.
- On Apple Music, Kiari:Offset additionally features the music videos for all standard edition songs, therefore serving as a visual album.
- "Bodies" contains samples of "Ringing Them Bells", as performed by the Spirituals, and "Bodies", written by Stevie Benton, Michael Luce, Christian Pierce and David Williams, and performed by Drowning Pool.

== Personnel ==
Credits adapted from Tidal.

=== Musicians ===
- Offset – vocals
- YoungBoy Never Broke Again – vocals (track 2)
- YFN Lucci – vocals (4)
- Gunna – vocals (5)
- JID – vocals (6, 19)
- Cassandra Webb – choir vocals (6, 19)
- Erica Elaine Webb – choir vocals (6, 19)
- Jwebby Muzik – choir vocals (6, 19)
- Ka'Mya Washington – choir vocals (6, 19)
- Khyree Hopkins – choir vocals (6, 19)
- Key Glock – vocals (8)
- Teezo Touchdown – vocals (15)
- John Legend – vocals (16)
- Ty Dolla Sign – vocals (17)

=== Technical ===
- Jrich Ent. – engineering (1–11, 13–20), additional engineering (12)
- Jason "Cheese" Goldberg – engineering (2)
- Keith Dawson – engineering (4)
- Florian "Flo" Ongonga – engineering (5, 23)
- John Kadadu – engineering (6, 19)
- Drü Oliver – engineering (12, 23)
- Andrew Keller – engineering (15)
- Tim McClain – engineering (16)
- Ty Dolla Sign – engineering (17)
- Erick Flores – engineering (21)
- Sean Phelan – engineering (22)
- Ladarius Byrd – additional engineering (1, 4, 9–11, 13, 14, 16)
- Patrizio "Teezio" Pigliapoco – mixing (1–3, 5–7, 10, 12, 13, 16–22)
- Aresh Banaji – mixing (4, 8, 9, 11, 14, 15)
- A. "Bainz" Bains – mixing (23)
- Emiliano Olocco – additional mixing (1–3, 5–7, 10, 12, 13, 16–22)
- Drew Sliger – additional mixing (4, 8, 9, 11, 14, 15)
- Jenso "JP" Plymouth – additional mixing (4, 8, 9, 11, 14, 15)
- Colin Leonard – mastering (1–19)
- Joe LaPorta – mastering (23)
- Ben Rugg – engineering assistance (23)

== Charts ==
=== Weekly charts ===
Weekly chart performance for Kiari
Chart (2025)	Peak position
Australian Albums (ARIA)	88
Australia Hip Hop/R&B Albums (ARIA)	18
Belgian Albums (Ultratop Flanders)	196
Belgian Albums (Ultratop Wallonia)	144
Canadian Albums (Billboard)	53
Dutch Albums (Album Top 100)	97
French Albums (SNEP)	86
Portuguese Albums (AFP)	82
Swiss Albums (Schweizer Hitparade)	13
US Billboard 200	16
US Top R&B/Hip-Hop Albums (Billboard)	5

=== Year-end charts ===
Year-end chart performance for Kiari
Chart (2025)	Position
US Top R&B/Hip-Hop Albums (Billboard)	83
