= GMFU (album) =

2026 studio album by Offset

Studio album by Offset
- Released: November 13, 2026
- Genres: Hip-hop; trap
- Length: 48:17
- Label: Motown
- Producers: 1st Class; Alex Lustig; Ankor; Atake; BlastyBeatz; Blazer; Chaileah; Crater; Curry; DBTZ; Elementry; Farri; FnZ; Go Grizzly; Hellrxin; IllaDaProducer; Jaasu; Jacob Turn It Up; Jester Beats; Joe Stanley; Kenny Stuntin; London on da Track; MannyVelli; Nyan; Pooh Beatz; Rxch; Shottie; SinfulYTS; Sky Rompiendo; Smatt Sertified; Southside; Spizzledow; Tommy Richman; TripleQ; Turbo; Wasa

Offset chronology
Haunted by Fame (2025)	GMFU (2026)

Singles from GMFU
- 1. "Something I Need" Released: September 18, 2026; 2. "Every Night" Released: October 8, 2026

GMFU (an initialism for Got Me Fucked Up) is the fourth studio album by American rapper Offset. It released on November 13, 2026.

== Release and promotion ==
In September 2026, Offset released the single "Something I Need". He released the single "Every Night" on October 8, 2026. The song features Don Toliver and samples Jodeci. The album was originally scheduled to release on October 23, 2026. The album did not release on the date, with HotNewHipHop noting that the album had no promotion in the days leading up to it. He then announced a new release date of November 13, 2026. On November 2, Offset shared the album's cover art. The album released on November 13, 2026.

== Artwork ==
The cover shows Offset in camouflage pants with an American flag over his head and eye black on his face. He sits on a stoop next to four ballet dancers.

== Track listing ==
GMFU track listing
No.	Title	Writer(s)	Producer(s)	Length
1.	"R4W" (with Quavo)	Kiari Cephus; Quavious Marshall; Ray Fraser	IllaDaProducer	2:59
2.	"I Did"	Cephus; Chandler Durham	Turbo	2:26
3.	"Why Not" (with Quavo and Loe Shimmy)	Cephus; Marshall; Shemar Cox; Jaasu Mallory; Alejandro Suárez	Jaasu; Sky Rompiendo	2:50
4.	"Every Night" (with Don Toliver)	Cephus; Caleb Toliver; Mallory; Donald DeGrate	Jaasu	2:44
5.	"Buy Ice"	Cephus; Joshua Luellen; Matthew-Kyle Brown; Giuseppe Vasaturo	Southside; Smatt Sertified; Wasa	2:36
6.	"Pop Shit"	Cephus; Andrew Korovin; Mark Karimov; Valery Artyomov; Terrius Robertson	Ankor; Curry; Farri; TripleQ	1:46
7.	"Misfits!" (with ApolloRed1 and OsamaSon)	Cephus; Artemus Henry; Amari Middleton; Khaleel Griffin; Yersultan Zakridinov	1st Class; Hellrxin	3:04
8.	"Back In That Mode II"	Cephus; Darryl Clemons; Kevin Price; Jerel Nance	Go Grizzly; Pooh Beatz	2:02
9.	"One Way Flight" (with Tommy Richman)	Cephus; Tommy Richman; Emmanuel Arah; Chidozie Arah; Jonathan Mack	Richman; MannyVelli; Spizzledow	2:29
10.	"5 Star"	Cephus; Robertson; Donald Childress IV; Timofey Isaev; Matvey Grishichev	Farri; BlastyBeatz; Jacob Turn It Up; SinfulYTS	3:43
11.	"Something I Need"	Cephus; Luellen; Brown; Jester McCue; Joe Stanley	Southside; Smatt Sertified; Jester Beats; Stanley	2:25
12.	"Trickin'"	Cephus; Luellen; Brown; Grant Hackett; Nikita Spirodonov	Southside; Smatt Sertified; Elementry; Rxch	1:53
13.	"She da Baddest"	Cephus; Mallory; Vladimir Vasilev; Isaac De Boni; Michael Mulé	Jaasu; Blazer; FnZ	2:23
14.	"GMFU"	Cephus; Anh-Tuan Tran; Ashot Akopian	Atake; Shottie	3:24
15.	"Spit Propane" (with Gunna)	Cephus; Sergio Kitchens; Liliane LaPlante; Kenneth Redfield	Chaileah; Kenny Stuntin	3:16
16.	"Pink Tops"	Cephus; Clemons; Price; Alex Lustig; Nyan Lieberthal	Go Grizzly; Pooh Beatz; Lustig; Nyan	2:10
17.	"My Heart"	Cephus; Jaucquez Lowe; London Holmes	DBTZ; London on da Track	3:11
18.	"Hating on Me" (with Larissa Lambert)	Cephus; Larissa Lambert; Robinson; Nathaniel Kim; Jordan Walker; Luka Berman	Farri; Crater	2:56
Total length:				48:17

== Personnel ==
These credits are adapted from Tidal.

- Offset – vocals
- Patrizio "Teezio" Pagliapoco – mixing
- Emiliano Olocco – additional mixing
- Jrich Ent. – engineering (tracks 1–4, 7–18), additional engineering (5, 6)
- Quavo – vocals (1, 3)
- Loe Shimmy – vocals (3)
- Don Toliver – vocals (4)
- DJ Durel – engineering (5, 6)
- ApolloRed1 – vocals (7)
- OsamaSon – vocals (7)
- Tommy Richman – vocals (9)
- Gunna – vocals (15)
- Flo – engineering (15)
- Larissa Lambert – vocals (18)
