= Startender =

2019 song by A Boogie wit da Hoodie featuring Offset and Tyga

Song by A Boogie wit da Hoodie featuring Offset and Tyga

from the album Hoodie SZN
- Released: December 14, 2018
- Length: 3:12
- Label: Highbridge; Atlantic
- Songwriters: Artist Dubose; Kiari Cephus; Michael Stevenson; Tyler Williams; Christian Ward; Christopher Dotson
- Producer: T-Minus

"Startender" is a song by American rapper A Boogie wit da Hoodie, released on December 14, 2018, as a track from his second studio album Hoodie SZN (2018). It features American rappers Offset and Tyga. The song was produced by T-Minus.

== Composition ==
"Startender" pays homage to women behind the bars in New York City strip clubs. In his signature melodic style, A Boogie wit da Hoodie sings about the kind of women he likes ("Ain't fuckin' with no off-brand bitch"); he also makes references to rapper Max B's diss track to fellow rapper Jim Jones ("Ooh she let me touch it in Miami / Ooh I'm feeling like I'm Biggavelli") in the chorus and a certain woman having abdominoplasty. Offset slightly speeds up in his performance, rapping about his luxuries such as Maybach and Patek Philippe. In the final verse, Tyga shouts out to Nelly, Belly, Tupac Shakur and Ray J, also mentioning the latter's song "Wait a Minute".

== Critical reception ==
The song received generally positive reviews. Tara Mahadevan of Complex and Karlton Jahmal of HotNewHipHop praised the song for its catchy chorus, with Jahmal adding, "The beat is made for dancing, and enlisting Tyga for a club banger geared towards the ladies was a smart move. That's where the former Young Money artist shines the most." Scott Glaysher of HipHopDX commented the song "demands replay after replay not only because A Boogie's chorus croons seamlessly across T-Minus toe-tapper but because Offset and Tyga also kick snappy verses that digest easier than applesauce. Dance to it, workout to it or sit in traffic with it, either way, it's hard to deny the bop." Robert Blair of HotNewHipHop gave an unfavorable response to the song, stating it "exudes a level of major label pragmatism in an attempt to boost his Billboard Hot 100 presence."

== Charts ==
Chart performance for "Startender"
Chart (2018–2019)	Peak position
Canada Hot 100 (Billboard)	46
New Zealand Hot Singles (RMNZ)	16
UK Singles (Official Charts)	84
US Billboard Hot 100	59
US Hot R&B/Hip-Hop Songs (Billboard)	21

== Certifications ==
Certifications for "Startender"
Region	Certification	Certified units/sales
Canada (Music Canada)	2× Platinum	160,000^{‡}
New Zealand (RMNZ)	Gold	15,000^{‡}
United Kingdom (BPI)	Silver	200,000^{‡}
United States (RIAA)	2× Platinum	2,000,000^{‡}
^{‡} Sales+streaming figures based on certification alone.
