= Rocking a Cardigan in Atlanta =

Single by Lil Shordie Scott

from the album The Twin Society
- Released: January 29, 2022
- Genre: Hip hop
- Length: 1:36
- Label: South Coast Music Group
- Songwriter: Lil Shordie Scott
- Producer: 3xMadeIt

Lil Shordie Scott singles chronology
"What What" (2022)	"Rocking a Cardigan in Atlanta" (2022)	"Slim Fit Polo Tee's From Lenox" (2022)

Alternative cover
- Offset remix cover

"Rocking a Cardigan in Atlanta" is a song by American rapper Lil Shordie Scott. It was released as a single on January 29, 2022 from his extended play, The Twin Society. In the song, Lil Shordie Scott raps in a high-pitched voice about wanting to take a picture with rapper Cardi B. It went viral on TikTok and peaked at number 77 on the Billboard Hot 100 in March 2022, while a remix of the song featuring Offset was released on April 27, 2022. Some critics described Lil Shordie Scott as a one-hit wonder for the song.

== Background and release ==
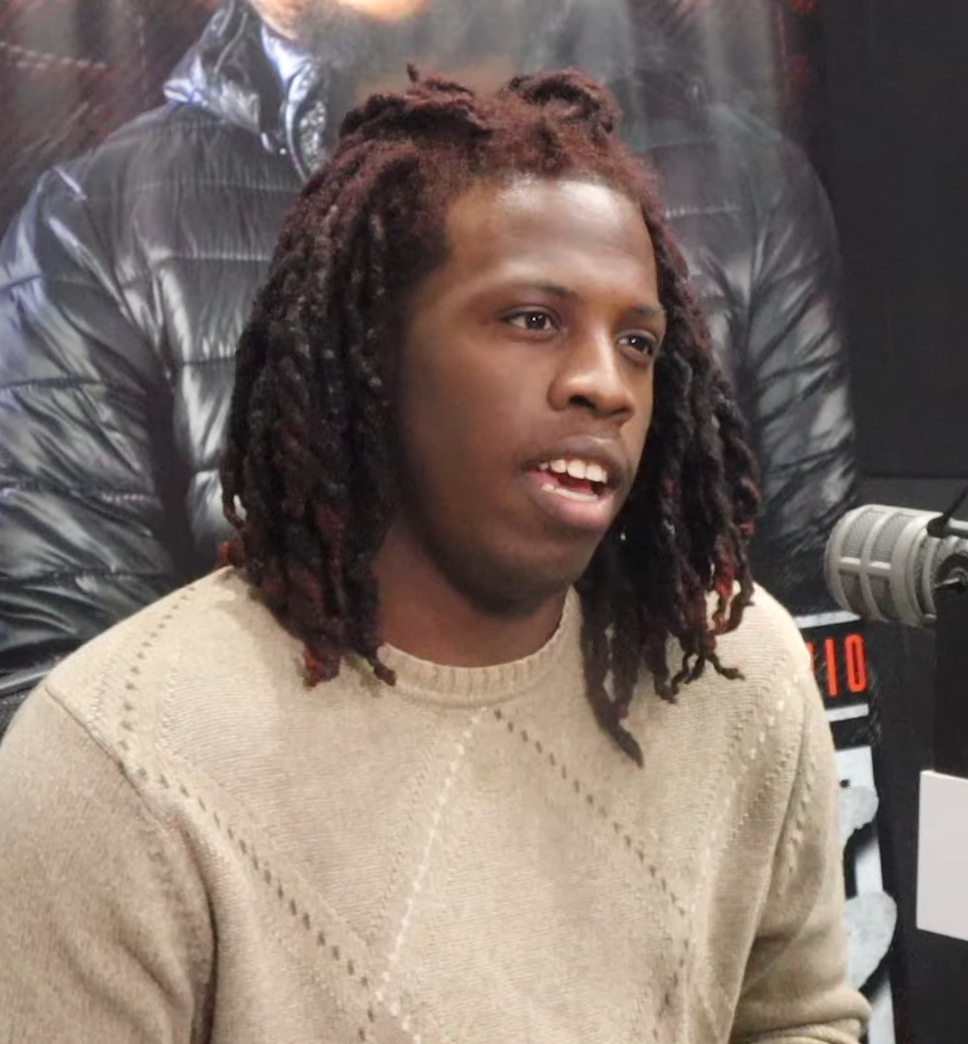
Lil Shordie Scott in 2022

Before releasing "Rocking a Cardigan in Atlanta", Atlanta-based rapper Lil Shordie Scott had signed with South Coast Music Group. Along with "Rocking a Cardigan in Atlanta", Lil Shordie Scott released the singles "Dopestar #Lifestyle", "What What", and "Slim Fit Polo Tee's From Lenox" in 2022. The music video for "Rocking a Cardigan in Atlanta" was uploaded to YouTube in January 2022. By April 2022, the video had received over two and a half million views. The song went viral on TikTok after a cover of it by @runuppercy went viral. The song entered the Billboard Hot 100 in March 2022, where it peaked at number 77. A remix of "Rocking a Cardigan in Atlanta" featuring American rapper Offset, Cardi B's then-husband, then was released on April 27, 2022 after Cardi B reposted a lyric from the song on her Twitter account the day prior. Cardi B also posted a video on TikTok using the song. "Rocking a Cardigan in Atlanta" was later included on Lil Shordie Scott's debut extended play, The Twin Society, which was released on July 29, 2022.

== Composition and reception ==
"Rocking a Cardigan in Atlanta" was produced by 3xMadeIt. It begins with an intro of three friends debating which female celebrity they would most like to take a photo with, with Lil Shordie Scott deciding on Cardi B and opening the song with the line, "I wanna take a pic with Cardi B inside my cardigan". He has stated that the line has "no meaning" but "sounded good". Paul Simpson of AllMusic described Lil Shordie Scott's voice as "distinctly helium-pitched [and] cartoonish" and Aidan C. Werder of Our Generation Music described it as a "squeaky falsetto".

For Uproxx, Caitlin White praised the song as "a pretty sharp single". In 2023, Aleia Woods of XXL called Lil Shordie Scott one of "hip-hop's biggest one-hit wonders" of the 2020s due to the song's success, writing that "the Atlanta rapper hasn't quite translated his viral stardom into chart-topping success the way many people thought". Our Generation Music's Aidan C. Werder wrote that "Rocking a Cardigan in Atlanta" led to "one-hit-wonder speculation" about Lil Shordie Scott.

== Charts ==
Weekly chart performance for "Rocking a Cardigan in Atlanta"
Chart (2022)	Peak position
Canada (Canadian Hot 100)	67
US Billboard Hot 100	77
US Hot R&B/Hip-Hop Songs (Billboard)	25
