= 54321 (song) =

2022 single by Offset

Single by Offset
- Released: August 19, 2022
- Genre: Southern hip hop
- Length: 3:02
- Label: Motown
- Songwriters: Kiari Cephus; Hykeem Carter, Jr.; Mike Dean; Jahaan Sweet; Ruchaun Akers, Jr.
- Producers: Baby Keem; Dean; Sweet; Scott Bridgeway

Offset singles chronology
"Big 14" (2022)	"54321" (2022)	"Code" (2022)

Music video
- "54321" on YouTube

"54321" is a song by American rapper Offset, released on August 19, 2022. It was produced by Baby Keem, with additional production from Mike Dean, Jahaan Sweet and Scott Bridgeway.

== Background ==
Offset began teasing the song in January 2022. He confirmed its release in August 2022 by sharing multiple sneak peeks on Instagram before releasing it.

== Composition ==
In the song, Offset raps in a rapid-fire flow, bragging about his accomplishments in life At one point, he references fellow Migos member Takeoff ("I'm outta here, five, four, three, two, one: Takeoff / Touch my brother, pull a gun").

== Music video ==
The music video was released alongside the single. In it, Offset visits an amusement park and is all dressed in Balenciaga. He is seen spinning in rides, moonwalking down a midway, and enjoying salty and sugary snacks.

== Live performances ==
On September 7, 2022, Offset performed a medley of "54321" and "Code" on The Tonight Show Starring Jimmy Fallon.

== Charts ==
Chart performance for "54321"
Chart (2022)	Peak position
US Billboard Hot 100	88
US Hot R&B/Hip-Hop Songs (Billboard)	25
