= Set It Off (Offset album) =

Studio album by Offset
- Released: October 13, 2023
- Recorded: 2021–2023
- Genre: Hip-hop; trap
- Length: 60:11
- Label: Motown
- Producer: Aaron Bow; BBP; Bobby Raps; Boi-1da; ChaseTheMoney; Daoud; Dez Wright; Don Mills; Fierce; FnZ; Heavy Mellow; IsThisShiv; Jahaan Sweet; Kutta Beats; Maneesh; Metro Boomin; Doughboy Beatz; Nick Papz; Nik D; Offset; Oscar Zulu; Oz; Peter Risk; Southside; Tay Keith; Teddy Walton; ThankYouFizzle; The Loud Pack; Thurdi; Too Dope; Vinylz; Wheezy

Offset chronology
Father of 4 (2019)	Set It Off (2023)	Kiari (2025)

Singles from Set It Off
- 1. "Jealousy" Released: July 28, 2023; 2. "Fan" Released: September 15, 2023; 3. "Worth It" Released: October 12, 2023; 4. "Say My Grace" Released: October 13, 2023

Set It Off is the second studio album by American rapper Offset. It was released on October 13, 2023, by Motown. The album contains guest appearances from Travis Scott, Don Toliver, Future, Cardi B, Mango Foo, Latto, Young Nudy, and Chlöe. Production was handled by a variety of record producers, including Offset himself, Southside, Vinylz, FnZ, Nick Papz, Daoud, Teddy Walton, Tay Keith, Oz, Ojivolta, Boi-1da, Metro Boomin, Wheezy, Doughboy Beatz, and Jahaan Sweet, among others. The album serves as the follow-up to Offset's previous album Father of 4 (2019), and is also his first project to not be released under Quality Control Music after ending his contract with the label due to its heads allegedly not giving him publishing rights for his music.

== Background ==
The album was originally speculated to be titled as Blame It on Set until Offset later said that it never was and was originally scheduled to be released on November 11, 2022, but it was postponed due to the passing of a fellow member of the Migos, Takeoff, who was shot and killed on November 1 of that same year. In May 2023, in an interview with Variety, Offset played the songs from the album that are collaborations with Travis Scott, Future, Chlöe, Latto, and Cardi B, and spoke about the album:

This is me going full-fledged into my solo career. The objective is to do it fully and smash shit and fuck the game up as a solo artist. I'm coming through, bustin' through the door. It's all set, my next chapter. It's my time.

== Promotion ==
The lead single of the album, "Jealousy", a collaboration with Offset's wife, Cardi B, was released on July 28, 2023. Offset revealed the new title, cover art, and release date of the album along with a pre-order on September 14, 2023. The second single, "Fan", was released the following day. The tracklist was revealed in collaboration with Spotify hip-hop playlist RapCaviar on October 4, 2023. The third single, "Worth It", a collaboration with American rapper and singer Don Toliver, was released on October 12, 2023, one day before the album was released. The fourth single, "Say My Grace", which features Travis Scott, was released along with the album the following day.

== Artwork ==
The artwork for Set It Off depicts an image of a burning city with Offset falling out of it, suggesting that he stands out in the burning rap industry. Rolling Stone's Mosi Reeves compared the cover art to American record producer Metro Boomin's (a producer on the album) debut studio album, Not All Heroes Wear Capes, in which Offset was a feature on.

== Critical reception ==
Professional ratings
Aggregate scores
Source	Rating
Metacritic	67/100
Review scores
Source	Rating
AllMusic	3.5/5 stars
Clash	8/10
Financial Times	3/5 stars
The Guardian	4/5 stars
HipHopDX	2.8/5
MusicOMH	3.5/5 stars
NME	3/5 stars
Pitchfork	6.3/10

Set It Off received a score of 67 out of 100 on review aggregator Metacritic based on eight critics' reviews, indicating "generally favorable" reception. Robin Murray from Clash felt that the album is a "21-track blockbuster" and is a "spark by love and grief". He noted that the album is "fuelled by braggadocio and a desire to set things right," stating that the album is Offset's "testament, and it's the closest we've come to the real Offset". Concluding the review, he stated that the album "underlines Offset's status as one of American rap's MVPs" and that "very often the finest moments on this album are its most humble". Financial Times' Ludovic Hunter-Tilney noted that the album "demonstrates the musicality of today’s rappers".

Writing for MusicOMH, Ben Devlin noted that "Set It Off is the work of a talented rapper with an interesting taste in production", but however, "Offset just needs a bit more consistency to stick the landing". Rolling Stone's Mosi Reeves stated that on the album, "Offset tries to shift the spotlight back to the music" following the drama of the split up of the Migos alongside Cardi B cheating rumors. Comparing it to Offset's debut studio album, Father of 4 (2019), Reeves wrote that "Set It Off is a much more confident solo project," noting that Offset "sounds hungry and driven to prove his relevance beyond Migos and Cardi B". Reeves concludes his review by noting that throughout the project, Offset "seems conflicted about where his current path may lead," stating that Set It Off "achieves a modest goal of being erratic yet diverting" and that "it may even establish Offset as a solo star instead of just a former Migo".

Variety's Todd Gilchrist stated that Set It Off "shows major artistic growth for the Atlanta rapper and sets a new course for him as a solo artist" while writing that "not every track is a classic, but the best moments find this fiery artist at the absolute top of his game". He concludes his review by noting that "Offset takes a lot of big swings here and while not all of them connect" while also stating that it is "exactly the place where an artist carving a new path for themselves should be".

NME's Kyann-Sian Williams called Set It Off an "melancholic-tinged turn-up", where "a more mature, reflective Offset was what was expected." They wrote, at first, the record was "tinged with dejection where lyrical maturity is scarce compared to the supercilious rhymes of the 31-year-old," and that Set It Off "doesn't reflect the legacy" the rapper has as a trap pioneer. In the conclusion, Williams referred to Offset and Metro Boomin's six-time platinum-selling 2017 single ‘Ric Flair Drip’, writing "Offset alludes that he’s in the same league as the 16-time wrestling champion – perhaps he’s more like Jeff Hardy; a beloved solo figure, but at his best with his brothers" – suggesting that the album doesn't touch his prior work with Migos.

== Commercial performance ==
Set It Off debuted at number 5 on the Billboard 200 with first week sales of 70,000 units (including 25,000 in pure sales). The album accumulated 59.1 million on-demand streams.

== Track listing ==
Set It Off track listing
No.	Title	Writer(s)	Producer(s)	Length
1.	"On the River"	Kiari Cephus; Joshua Luellen; Kirby Lauryen Dockery; Thomas Brenneck; Ashot Akopian	Southside; Shottie^{[a]}	1:36
2.	"Say My Grace" (featuring Travis Scott)	Cephus; Jacques Webster II; Anderson Hernandez; Michael Mulé; Isaac De Boni; Maneesh Bidaye; Douglas Ford	Offset; Vinylz; FnZ; Maneesh	2:53
3.	"Worth It" (with Don Toliver)	Cephus; Caleb Toliver; James Seals; Javaan Anderson; Ford; Chase Rose; Everett Romano	ChaseTheMoney; Heavy Mellow	3:08
4.	"Broad Day" (with Future)	Cephus; Nayvadius Wilburn; Nikolas Papamitrou; Daoud Anthony; Ford	Nick Papz; Daoud	2:48
5.	"Fan"	Cephus; Mulé; De Boni; Travis Walton; Joshua Goldenberg; Leon McQuay III; Aaron Booe; Ford	FnZ; Teddy Walton; Thank You Fizzle; Thurdi; Aaron Bow	2:36
6.	"Freaky" (with Cardi B)	Cephus; Belcalis Almánzar; Brytavious Chambers	Tay Keith	3:19
7.	"Hop Out the Van"	Cephus; Ozan Yıldırım; Ford	Oz	2:00
8.	"Don't You Lie"	Cephus; Luellen; Robert Richardson; Lesidney Ragland; Mark Williams; Raul Cubina	Southside; Bobby Raps; Too Dope; Offset^{[b]}; Ojivolta^{[b]}	3:11
9.	"I'm On"	Cephus; Matthew Samuels; Peter Risk	Boi-1da; Risk	3:25
10.	"Big Dawg"	Cephus; Yıldırım	Oz	1:45
11.	"Night Vision"	Cephus; Leland Wayne; Bradley Brandon	Metro Boomin; Doughboy^{[a]}	3:12
12.	"Skyami" (featuring Mango Foo)	Cephus; Michael Millhouse; Samuels	Boi-1da	3:33
13.	"Dissolve"	Cephus; Williams; Cubina; Ford; Dylan Cleary-Krell	Offset; Dez Wright	3:07
14.	"Fine as Can Be" (with Latto)	Cephus; Alyssa Stephens; Zachary Mullett	Kutta Beats	3:32
15.	"Buss My Watch"	Cephus; Wesley Glass	Wheezy	1:57
16.	"Dope Boy" (with Young Nudy)	Cephus; Quantavious Thomas; Yıldırım; Nik Frascona; Joseph Talamo	Oz; Nik D; Oscar Zulu	2:43
17.	"Princess Cut" (with Chlöe)	Cephus; Chloe Bailey; Robin Waiss	BBP	4:10
18.	"Jealousy" (with Cardi B)	Cephus; Almánzar; Yıldırım; Samuels; Jahaan Sweet; Paul Beauregard; Jordan Houston; Arthur Herzog Jr.; Billie Holiday	Oz; Boi-1da; Sweet	2:54
19.	"Blame It on Set"	Cephus; Amir Sims; Shivam Barot; Patrick Rosario; Samuels; Scotty Coleman; Ford	Fierce; The Loud Pack; Boi-1da^{[b]}; Coleman^{[b]}	3:58
20.	"Upside Down"	Cephus; Miloš Angelov; Williams; Cubina; Ford	Offset; Don Mills; Ojivolta^{[b]}	2:11
21.	"Healthy"	Cephus; Angelov; Williams; Cubina; Ford	Offset; Don Mills; Ojivolta^{[b]}	2:13
Total length:				60:11

Set It Off (versions) track listing
No.	Title	Writer(s)	Producer(s)	Length
1.	"Say My Grace" (featuring Travis Scott)	Cephus; Webster; Hernandez; Mulé; De Boni; Bidaye; Ford	Vinylz; FnZ; Maneesh	2:53
2.	"Say My Grace" (featuring Travis Scott) (sped up)	Cephus; Webster; Hernandez; Mulé; De Boni; Bidaye; Ford	Vinylz; FnZ; Maneesh	2:17
3.	"Say My Grace" (featuring Travis Scott) (slowed)	Cephus; Webster; Hernandez; Mulé; De Boni; Bidaye; Ford	Vinylz; FnZ; Maneesh	3:23
4.	"Worth It" (with Don Toliver)	Cephus; Toliver; Seals; Anderson; Ford; Rose; Romano	ChaseTheMoney; Heavy Mellow	3:08
5.	"Worth It" (with Don Toliver) (sped up)	Cephus; Toliver; Seals; Anderson; Ford; Rose; Romano	ChaseTheMoney; Heavy Mellow	2:50
6.	"Worth It" (with Don Toliver) (slowed)	Cephus; Toliver; Seals; Anderson; Ford; Rose; Romano	ChaseTheMoney; Heavy Mellow	3:40
7.	"Freaky" (with Cardi B)	Cephus; Almánzar; Chambers	Tay Keith	3:19
8.	"Freaky" (with Cardi B) (sped up)	Cephus; Almánzar; Chambers	Tay Keith	2:52
9.	"Freaky" (with Cardi B) (slowed)	Cephus; Almánzar; Chambers	Tay Keith	3:42
10.	"Fan"	Cephus; Ford; Mulé; Walton; Goldenberg; McQuay; Booe	FnZ; Teddy Walton; Thank You Fizzle; Thurdi; Aaron Bow	2:36
11.	"Fan" (sped up)	Cephus; Ford; Mulé; Walton; Goldenberg; McQuay; Booe	FnZ; Teddy Walton; Thank You Fizzle; Thurdi; Aaron Bow	2:19
12.	"Fan" (slowed)	Cephus; Ford; Mulé; Walton; Goldenberg; McQuay; Booe	FnZ; Teddy Walton; Thank You Fizzle; Thurdi; Aaron Bow	2:57
13.	"Broad Day" (with Future)	Cephus; Wilburn; Papamitrou; Anthony; Ford	Nick Papz; Daoud	2:48
14.	"Broad Day" (featuring Future) (sped up)	Cephus; Wilburn; Papamitrou; Anthony; Ford	Nick Papz; Daoud	2:33
15.	"Broad Day" (featuring Future) (slowed)	Cephus; Wilburn; Papamitrou; Anthony; Ford	Nick Papz; Daoud	3:50
Total length:				45:14

Notes

- ^{^[a]} signifies an uncredited co-producer
- ^{^[b]} signifies an additional producer

== Charts ==
=== Weekly charts ===
Weekly chart performance for Set It Off
Chart (2023)	Peak position
Australian Albums (ARIA)	58
Australian Hip Hop/R&B Albums (ARIA)	12
Austrian Albums (Ö3 Austria)	22
Belgian Albums (Ultratop Flanders)	58
Belgian Albums (Ultratop Wallonia)	49
Canadian Albums (Billboard)	10
Danish Albums (Hitlisten)	22
Dutch Albums (Album Top 100)	24
French Albums (SNEP)	24
German Albums (Offizielle Top 100)	35
Hungarian Albums (MAHASZ)	18
Icelandic Albums (Tónlistinn)	24
Italian Albums (FIMI)	21
Lithuanian Albums (AGATA)	31
New Zealand Albums (RMNZ)	17
Norwegian Albums (VG-lista)	4
Polish Albums (ZPAV)	82
Swiss Albums (Schweizer Hitparade)	6
UK Albums (OCC)	62
US Billboard 200	5
US Top R&B/Hip-Hop Albums (Billboard)	2

=== Year-end charts ===
Year-end chart performance for Set It Off
Chart (2024)	Position
US Top R&B/Hip-Hop Albums (Billboard)	78
