= FnZ =

Australian music producers

FNZ
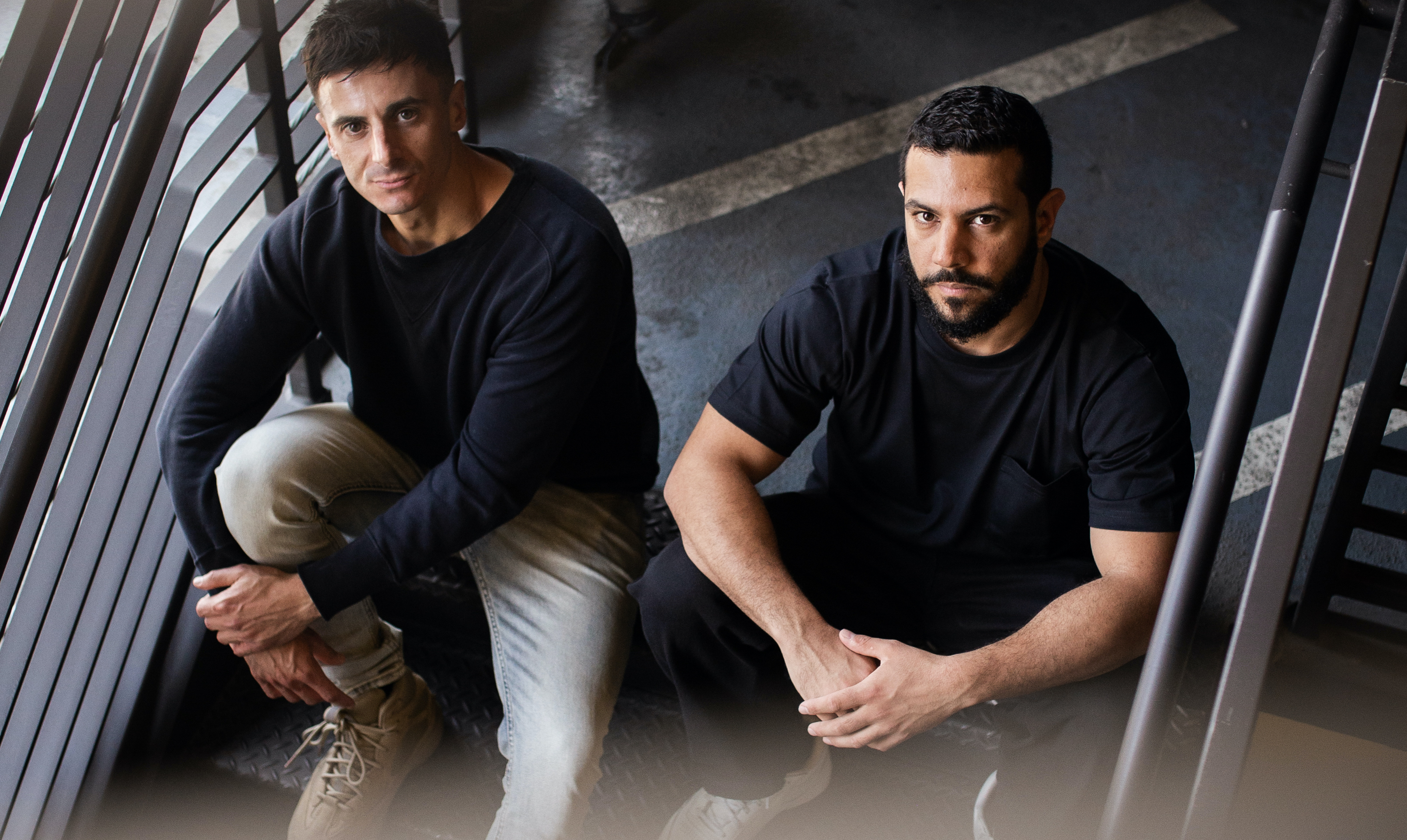
- FNZ in 2022

Background information
- Also known as: Finatik N Zac
- Origin: Perth, Australia
- Genres: Hip-hop; pop rap
- Occupations: Record producers; songwriters
- Years active: 2009–present
- Labels: Pulse; Rebel Rock
- Members: Michael "Finatik" Mulé; Isaac "Zac" De Boni

FNZ (also known as Finatik N Zac) are an Australian record production duo composed of Michael "Finatik" Mulé and Isaac "Zac" De Boni. The group was formed in 2009, signing to fellow producer Jim Jonsin's Rebel Rock Entertainment the following year. They first received credits on his productions for much of the following decade, although they've since expanded their work doing so independently by the 2020s.

== Production credits ==
Year	Artist	Song	Album
2026	Future	"Fukk a Interview"	The Real Me
2026	Drake	Janice STFU	Iceman
2026	Drake	What Did I Miss?	Iceman
2026	Drake	Plot Twist	Iceman
2026	MGK and Wiz Khalifa	Stoned	Blog Era Boyz
2026	Coi Leray (featuring NBA YoungBoy)	Better Than You	
2026	Baby Keem	No Security	Ca$ino
2026	J.Cole	39 Intro	The Fall-Off
2026	J.Cole	And the Whole World Is the Ville	The Fall-Off
2026	Don Toliver	Gemstone	Octane
2026	Don Toliver	TMU	Octane
2026	Trap Dickey (featuring Key Glock)	Down South	
2026	The Kid Laroi	Rather Be (featuring Lithe)	Before I Forget
2026	The Kid Laroi	Come Down	Before I Forget
2026	Nelly Furtado	Electric Circus (featuring Boi-1da and Canada Soccer)	What If It All Goes Right?
2026	YoungBoy Never Broke Again	Teary Eyes (featuring Burna Boy)	Slime Cry
2025	21 Savage	Gang Over Everything (featuring Metro Boomin)	What Happened to the Streets?
2025	Kodak Black	Time To Be Free	Just Getting Started
2025	Kodak Black	Prison Deform	Just Getting Started
2025	Ian	Soul Provider	2005
2025	YFN Lucci	TXTS 4RM MY EX	Already Legend
2025	Pluto	Pluto Walk	Pluto Walk
2025	Cardi B	Better Than You (featuring Cash Cobain)	Am I The Drama?
2025	Jermaine Dupri (featuring T.I. and Young Dro	Pussy Got Me	Magic City
2025	Tomorrow X Together	Upside Down Kiss	The Star Chapter: Together
2025	Drake	What Did I Miss?	
2025	Offset	Bodies (featuring JID)	Kiari
2025	Aminé	New Flower! (featuring Leon Thomas)	13 Months of Sunshine
2025	Aminé	Feel So Good	13 Months of Sunshine
2025	Fuerza Regida	Lokita (featuring Anuel AA)	111XPANTIA
2025	Lil Durk	Deep Depression	Deep Thoughts
2025	Eladio Carrión	Comodo	Don Kbrn
2025	J-Hope & Miguel	Sweet Dreams (FNZ Remix)	
2025	Aminé	Vacay	
2025	Kai Ca$h	What You Want	
2025	Lil Nas X	Lean On My Body	
2025	Lisa	Fxck Up the World (featuring Future)	Alter Ego
2025	Travis Scott	4X4	
2024	SahBabii	Workin	Saaheem
2024	Lil Uzi Vert	We Good	Eternal Atake 2
2024	Snoop Dogg	Outta da Blue (featuring Dr. Dre and Alus)	Missionary
2024	Denzel Curry	Act a Damn Fool (featuring Duke Deuce and Slim Guerilla)	King of the Mischievous South Vol. 2
2024	Cordae	No Bad News (featuring Ye)	The Crossroads
2024	Cordae	06 Dreamin	The Crossroads
2024	Megan Thee Stallion	Right Now	Megan: Act II
2024	Tee Grizzley	All I Wanna Do	Post Traumatic
2024	Tee Grizzley	Blueprint	Post Traumatic
2024	Smoko Ono	Deep End	
2024	GloRilla	Hollon	Glorious
2024	Future	Lost My Dog	Mixtape Pluto
2024	Nelly Furtado	Floodgate	7
2024	Destroy Lonely	Cadillac	Love Lasts Forever
2024	YG	It's Givin (featuring Ty Dolla $ign)	Just Re'd Up 3
2024	Ravyn Lenae	One Wish (featuring Childish Gambino)	Bird's Eye
2024	¥$	530	Vultures 2
2024	¥$	My Soul	Vultures 2
2024	¥$	Lifestyle (featuring Lil Wayne)	Vultures 2
2024	Big Sean	Yes	Better Me Than You
2024	Big Sean	Precision	Better Me Than You
2024	Will Smith	You Can Make It (featuring Fridayy and Sunday Service Choir)	
2024	Channel Tres	Holy Moly (featuring Ty Dolla $ign)	Head Rush
2024	Camila Cabello	June Gloom	C,XOXO
2024	Denzel Curry	Hot One (featuring FERG and TiaCorine)	King of the Mischievous South, Vol. 2
2024	Sabrina Carpenter	Espresso (Mark Ronson x FNZ Working Late Remix)	Espresso (Working Late Remixes)
2024	Shenseea	Facelift	Never Get's Late Here
2024	A Boogie wit da Hoodie	P&E (featuring Mariah the Scientist)	Better Off Alone
2024	Bryson Tiller	Ciao!	Bryson Tiller
2024	J. Cole	H.Y.B.(featuring Bas and Central Cee)	Might Delete Later
2024	¥$ (Kanye West and Ty Dolla $ign)	Stars	Vultures 1
2024	Kid Cudi	Black Ops (featuring Denzel Curry)	Moon Man (Original Motion Picture Soundtrack)
2024	21 Savage	Just Like Me (Burna Boy and Metro Boomin)	American Dream
2024	Kid Cudi	Most Ain't Dennis	Insano
2024	Kid Cudi	A Tale of a Knight	Insano
2023	Nicki Minaj	Big Difference	Pink Friday 2
2023	Drake	You Broke My Heart	Scary Hours 3
2023	Drake	Evil Ways (featuring J. Cole)	Scary Hours 3
2023	The Kid LAROI	What's The Move? (featuring Future and BabyDrill)	The First Time
2023	The Kid LAROI	Sorry	The First Time
2023	The Kid LAROI	Deserve You	The First Time
2023	The Kid LAROI	Where Do You Sleep?	The First Time
2023	The Kid LAROI	Where Does Your Spirit Go?	The First Time
2023	Queen Naija	All or Nothing (featuring Ella Mai)	After the Butterflies
2023	Queen Naija	One of Them Days (featuring Monica)	After the Butterflies
2023	Drake	First Person Shooter (featuring J. Cole)	For All The Dogs
2023	Offset	Fan	Set It Off
2023	Offset	Say My Grace (featuring Travis Scott)	Set It Off
2023	Offset	Healthy	Set It Off
2023	Lil Wayne	Kat Food	The Fix Before The VI
2023	Marshmello	Tempo (featuring Young Miko)	
2023	Reason	Too Much! (Melly Mel)	Porches
2023	Mick Jenkins	Mop	The Patience
2023	Trippie Redd	Wind (featuring The Kid LAROI)	A Love Letter to You 5
2023	Travis Scott	Thank God	Utopia
2023	Young Thug	Oh U Went featuring Drake	Business Is Business
2023	Jack Harlow	Denver	Jackman
2023	JELEEL!	SHOTS! (featuring Denzel Curry)	REAL RAW!
2023	JELEEL!	THOR!	REAL RAW!
2023	JELEEL!	WICKED!	REAL RAW!
2023	JELEEL!	MAN OF THE YEAR!	REAL RAW!
2023	The Kid LAROI	I GUESS IT'S LOVE?	
2023	Kodak Black	Maui Woop	
2023	Chlöe	Told Ya (featuring Missy Elliott)	In Pieces
2022	Drake	Rich Flex (featuring 21 Savage)	Her Loss
2022	Jeezy	MJ Jeezy	Snowfall
2022	Lil Baby	Stop Playin (featuring Jeremih)	It's Only Me
2022	Ty Dolla Sign	My Friends (featuring Mustard)	
2022	Meechy Darko	PRADA U	Gothic Luxury
2022	Samaria	Still Got 4ever	Didn't Start with You
2022	Burna Boy	How Bad Could It Be	Love, Damini
2022	Vory	Believe In Me	Lost Souls
2022	Kendrick Lamar	Die Hard (featuring Blxst and Amanda Reifer)	Mr. Morale & the Big Steppers
2022	Jack Harlow	Dua Lipa	Come Home the Kids Miss You
2022	Future	Wait For U (featuring Drake and Tems)	I Never Liked You
2022	Future	Love You Better	I Never Liked You
2022	Pusha T	Just So You Remember	It's Almost Dry
2022	Latto	It's Givin	Latto
2022	Kanye West	Pablo (featuring Travis Scott and Future)	Donda 2
2022	Kanye West	We Did It Kid (featuring Baby Keem and Migos)	Donda 2
2022	Denzel Curry	The Last	Melt My Eyez See Your Future
2022	Ski Mask the Slump God	Alien Sex	The Lost Files
2022	Murda Beatz	One shot (featuring Blxst and Wale)	
2021	Kodak Black	Too Boosie	Before the Album
2021	Ty Dolla Sign	GYU (featuring Bino Rideaux)	Snoop Dogg Presents Algorithm
2021	Erica Banks	On They Neck	Bruised Soundtrack
2021	Flo Milli	Blastoff	Bruised Soundtrack
2021	Megan Thee Stallion	Eat It	Something For Thee Hotties
2021	BlocBoy JB	M.E.M 2 Jacksonville (featuring SpotemGottem)	
2021	No Cap	Sun Up to Sun Down	
2021	French Montana	How You King?	They Got Amnesia
2021	French Montana	Touch The Sky (featuring John Legend and Rick Ross)	They Got Amnesia
2021	Anuel AA	Leyenda	Las Leyendas Nunca Mueren
2021	Baby Keem	Scapegoats	The Melodic Blue
2021	Chlöe	Have Mercy	
2021	Tommy Genesis	Kamikaze	goldilocks x
2021	Warren Hue & Seori	Warriors	Marvel's Shang-Chi and the Legend of the Ten Rings: The Album
2021	Kanye West	Believe What I Say	Donda
2021	Kanye West	Donda (featuring Tony Williams and Sunday Service Choir)	Donda
2021	Kanye West	Keep My Spirit Alive (featuring KayCyy Pluto and Griselda)	Donda
2021	Kanye West	Lord I Need You	Donda
2021	Kanye West	Tell the Vision (featuring Pop Smoke)	Donda
2021	Lil Dicky	Penith	Dave: Episode 10 "Dave"
2021	Young Dolph	Beat It (featuring Bigg Unccc)	Paper Route Illuminati
2021	Logic	Inside	Bobby Tarantino III
2021	Pop Smoke	Tell the Vision (featuring Kanye West and Pusha T)	Faith
2021	Twelve'len	Loyal	Sugar Hill Express
2021	Twelve'len	Location	Sugar Hill Express
2021	Twelve'len	Thank the Gang (featuring Guapdad 4000)	Sugar Hill Express
2021	Twelve'len	Back to You (featuring Childish Major)	Sugar Hill Express
2021	Twelve'len	Bang that Sugar	Sugar Hill Express
2021	Twelve'len	Let's Stay	Sugar Hill Express
2021	Twelve'len	Broken Wings	Sugar Hill Express
2021	Kah-Lo	Commandments	The Arrival
2021	Jasiah	Art of War (featuring Denzel Curry & Rico Nasty)	WAR
2021	Kodak Black	Z Look Jamaican	Haitian Boy Kodak
2021	Rich Dunk	Out the Mud	
2021	Meek Mill	Lemon Pepper Freestyle	
2021	Money Mu	Problem (featuring Pooh Shiesty)	
2021	Lakeyah	Young and Ratchet	In Due Time
2021	Lakeyah	Perfect (featuring Yung Bleu)	In Due Time
2021	Toosii	Back Together	Thank You for Believing
2021	Drake	Lemon Pepper Freestyle (featuring Rick Ross)	Scary Hours 2
2021	Babyface Ray	Tahoe	Unfuckwitable
2021	CJ	I'm Lit (featuring French Montana)	Loyalty over Royalty
2021	for KING & COUNTRY	Amen (Reborn) (featuring Lecrae & The World Famous Tony Williams)	
2020	Lakeyah	Basic	Time's Up
2020	Kid Cudi	She Knows This	Man on the Moon III: The Chosen
2020	DJ Scheme	Blue Bills (featuring $NOT & Fenix Fllexin)	Family
2020	Kidd Keo	Lil Bit (featuring Kiing Shooter)	Back to Rockport
2020	Yung Baby Tate	I Am (featuring Flo Milli)	After the Rain
2020	Kevin Gates	Power (featuring Dom Kennedy)	
2020	The Kid LAROI	Pikachu	F*ck Love (Savage)
2020	ONEFOUR	My City (featuring the Kid Laroi)	Against All Odds
2020	Denzel Curry	Live from the Abyss	
2020	Ronny J	At the Top	Jupiter
2020	Logic	Perfect	No Pressure
2020	Kanye West	Wash Us in the Blood (featuring Travis Scott)	Non-album single
2020	IDK	Bulletproof (featuring Denzel Curry & Maxo Kream)	IDK & Friends 2 (Basketball County soundtrack)
2020	Denzel Curry	Charlie Sheen (featuring Ghostemane)	13lood 1n + 13lood Out Mixx
2020	Denzel Curry	Welcome to the Future (featuring Xavier Wulf & Seshollowaterboyz)	13lood 1n + 13lood Out Mixx
2020	Denzel Curry	No Pen No Pad	13lood 1n + 13lood Out Mixx
2019	Kanye West	Our King	Nebuchadnezzar: A Kanye West Opera
2019	Kanye West	Wash Us in the Blood	Nebuchadnezzar: A Kanye West Opera
2019	Kanye West	Fighting Fires	Nebuchadnezzar: A Kanye West Opera
2019	Kanye West	Everything We Need (featuring Ty Dolla Sign & Ant Clemons)	Jesus Is King
2019	DaniLeigh	Cravin (featuring G-Eazy)	
2019	Jaden Smith	Ghost (Remix) (featuring ASAP Rocky)	Erys
2019	Twelve'len	Thank The Gang (Remix) (featuring Guapdad 4000)	
2019	Denzel Curry	Shawshank (featuring Tate Kobang)	Madden NFL 20 soundtrack
2019	Denzel Curry	Zuu	Zuu
2019	Denzel Curry	Ricky	Zuu
2019	Denzel Curry	Wish (featuring Kiddo Marv)	Zuu
2019	Denzel Curry	Birdz (featuring Rick Ross)	Zuu
2019	Denzel Curry	Bushy B Interlude	Zuu
2019	Denzel Curry	Carolmart (featuring Ice Billion Berg)	Zuu
2019	Denzel Curry	Shake 88 (featuring Sam Sneak)	Zuu
2019	Denzel Curry	P.A.T. (featuring PlayThatBoiZay)	Zuu
2019	Twelve'len	Thank The Gang	
2019	Netsky	I Don't Even Know You Anymore (featuring Bazzi & Lil Wayne)	
2018	IDK	Once Upon A Time (featuring Denzel Curry)	
2018	Jaden Smith	Ghost	Erys
2018	Vancouver Sleep Clinic	Closure (featuring Drew Love)	Therapy Phase
2018	Vancouver Sleep Clinic	In The End	Therapy Phase
2018	Vancouver Sleep Clinic	Bloodshot	Therapy Phase
2018	Vancouver Sleep Clinic	Silver Lining	Therapy Phase
2018	Denzel Curry & IDK	Uh Huh	
2018	ASAP Rocky	Tony Tone (featuring Puff Daddy)	Testing
2018	ASAP Rocky	Fukk Sleep (featuring FKA Twigs)	Testing
2018	ASAP Rocky	Changes	Testing
2018	ASAP Rocky	Purity (featuring Frank Ocean)	Testing
2018	Denzel Curry	Taboo	Ta13oo
2018	Denzel Curry	Black Balloons (featuring GoldLink & Twelve'len)	Ta13oo
2018	Denzel Curry	Cash Maniac (Featuring Nyyjerya)	Ta13oo
2018	Denzel Curry	Super Saiyan Superman	Ta13oo
2018	Denzel Curry	Mad I Got It	Ta13oo
2018	Denzel Curry	The Blackest Balloon	Ta13oo
2018	Denzel Curry	Percs	Ta13oo
2018	Denzel Curry	Vengeance (featuring JPEGMafia & ZillaKami)	Ta13oo
2018	Denzel Curry	Black Metal Terrorist	Ta13oo
2018	ASAP Rocky	Bad Company (featuring BlocBoy JB)	
2018	G-Eazy	Mama Always Told Me (featuring Madison Love)	The Beautiful & Damned
2017	Mr. Probz	Till You're Loved	
2017	Allan Kingdom	Know About It	Lines
2017	Allan Kingdom	The Fusion (featuring Denzel Curry)	Lines
2017	Denzel Curry	Hate Government	13
2017	Denzel Curry	Zeltron 6 Billion (featuring Lil Ugly Mane)	13
2017	ASAP Nast	Playa Hater	
2017	ASAP Twelvyy	Diamonds (featuring ASAP Rocky)	12
2017	Ritual	Real Feels (featuring Denzel Curry)	
2016	Wiz Khalifa	Celebrate	Khalifa
2016	Wiz Khalifa	Cowboy	Khalifa
2016	Denzel Curry	ULT	Imperial
2016	Denzel Curry	Gook	Imperial
2016	Denzel Curry	Sick & Tired	Imperial
2016	Denzel Curry	Knotty Head (featuring Rick Ross)	Imperial
2016	Denzel Curry	Pure Enough	Imperial
2016	Denzel Curry	Zenith (featuring Joey Badass)	Imperial
2016	Denzel Curry	This Life	Imperial
2016	Denzel Curry	Today (featuring Boogie & Allan Kingdom)	
2016	Nell	Redemption (featuring Denzel Curry)	
2016	Fetty Wap	Make You Feel Good	
2015	ASAP Rocky	LSD	At. Long. Last. ASAP
2015	ASAP Rocky	Excuse Me	At. Long. Last. ASAP
2015	Rico Love	For The Kids	Rico Love
2015	Rico Love	The Affair	Rico Love
2015	Machine Gun Kelly	Spotlight	General Admission
2015	Machine Gun Kelly	Oz.	General Admission
2015	Machine Gun Kelly	Gone	General Admission
2015	Machine Gun Kelly	Merry Go Round	General Admission
2015	Chris Brown	Blue Jeans	Royalty
2014	Various Artists	A Million (performed by John Legend)	About Last Night: Original Motion Picture Soundtrack
2014	Kevin Gates	Go Hard (featuring Rico Love)	By Any Means
2014	Wiz Khalifa	Promises	Blacc Hollywood
2014	Wiz Khalifa	KK	Blacc Hollywood
2014	Wiz Khalifa	Ass Drop	Blacc Hollywood
2014	Big K.R.I.T.	Pay Attention (featuring Rico Love)	Cadillactica
2014	Rico Love	Japanese Denim	I Sin
2014	Boaz	That Goodie Good	Intuition
2013	ASAP Rocky	Long Live ASAP	Long. Live. ASAP
2013	ASAP Ferg	Murda Something (featuring Waka Flocka Flame)	Trap Lord
2013	B.o.B.	Nobody Told Me	Underground Luxury
2011	Wax	Two Wheels	Scrublife
2011	Pac Div	Let Loose	
2010	Serius Jones	Gimme That Love (featuring Omar Wilson)	Life is Serius: The Soundtrack
2010	Yelawolf	Billy Crystal	Trunk Muzik 0-60
2010	Noisettes	Don't Upset The Rhythm (Club Mix) (featuring Wale & Estelle)	
2010	New Breed	Still Won't Change (featuring Brisco)	15 Minutes Till Fame
2009	Clyde Carson	Wonderful (featuring Prozak)	Wonderful

Notes

- ^{^[a]} signifies songwriting credit only
