= Worth It (Offset and Don Toliver song) =

Single by Offset and Don Toliver

from the album Set It Off
- Released: October 12, 2023
- Length: 3:08
- Label: Motown
- Songwriters: Kiari Cephus; Caleb Toliver; James Seals; Javaan Anderson; Douglas Ford; Chase Rose; Everett Romano
- Producers: ChaseTheMoney; Heavy Mellow

Offset singles chronology
"Fan" (2023)	"Worth It" (2023)	"Say My Grace" (2023)

Don Toliver singles chronology
"Ring Ring" (2023)	"Worth It" (2023)	"Bandit" (2024)

Lyric video
- "Worth It" on YouTube

"Worth It" is a song by American rappers Offset and Don Toliver. It was released through Motown as the third single from Offset's second studio album, Set It Off, on October 12, 2023, one day before the album. Offset and Toliver wrote the song alongside James Seals, Javaan Anderson, and Douglas Ford, and with producers ChaseTheMoney and Heavy Mellow. The song marks the second collaboration between the two artists, following Toliver's 2019 single, "Had Enough", which also features American rapper Quavo, who is Offset's cohort from the now-defunct hip hop trio Migos.

== Composition and lyrics ==
"Worth It" is a calm slow-burning song in which Offset raps the two verses and Don Toliver shows his melodies as he sings the chorus. The song contains an Afro-fusion-inspired instrumental as Toliver sings: "You got me, got me workin' / I hope it's worth it". Armon Sadler wrote the review for the song in an article on Vibe and felt that it "will be the record to take off".

== Charts ==
=== Weekly charts ===
Weekly chart performance for "Worth It"
Chart (2023–2024)	Peak position
Canada Hot 100 (Billboard)	74
Global 200 (Billboard)	128
New Zealand Hot Singles (RMNZ)	4
Switzerland (Schweizer Hitparade)	45
UK Singles (OCC)	52
UK Hip Hop/R&B (OCC)	34
US Billboard Hot 100	90
US Hot R&B/Hip-Hop Songs (Billboard)	29
US Rhythmic Airplay (Billboard)	6

=== Year-end charts ===
2024 year-end chart performance for "Worth It"
Chart (2024)	Position
US Hot R&B/Hip-Hop Songs (Billboard)	64
US Rhythmic (Billboard)	27
