= Code (song) =

2022 single by Offset and Moneybagg Yo

Single by Offset and Moneybagg Yo
- Released: August 26, 2022
- Length: 3:12
- Label: Motown
- Songwriters: Kiari Cephus; DeMario White Jr.; Mohkom Bhangal; Marius Kampart; Veyis-Can Urun
- Producers: Money Musik; ARJI; Veyis

Offset singles chronology
"54321" (2022)	"Code" (2022)	"Ella Quiere" (2022)

Moneybagg Yo singles chronology
"Big 14" (2022)	"Code" (2022)	"Too Much" (2022)

Music video
- "Code" on YouTube

"Code" is a song by American rappers Offset and Moneybagg Yo, released on August 26, 2022. It was produced by Money Musik, ARJI and Veyis.

== Composition ==
The song has an uptempo beat, over which Offset raps in a staccato delivery and Auto-Tuned vocals, while Moneybagg Yo performs in a brooding tone. Lyrically, the song centers on them being ahead of their time and criticizing "counterfeit" rappers.

== Music video ==
A music video was released alongside the single. Directed by Claire Arnold, it stars American model Bella Hadid, showing her and the rappers wearing Balenciaga clothing and jewelry. Offset and Moneybagg Yo appear in a white background and in a blue-lit studio. Hadid poses and does planks inside a lighted wall box, first wearing a rhinestone bikini with boots and black gloves, before adding a neon green fake fur coat and black hoodie to her outfit. Later, she wears a white faux fur coat and black sunglasses during a runway walk.

== Live performances ==
On September 7, 2022, Offset performed a medley of "Code" and "54321" on The Tonight Show Starring Jimmy Fallon.

== Charts ==
Chart performance for "Code"
Chart (2022)	Peak position
US Bubbling Under Hot 100 (Billboard)	12
US Hot R&B/Hip-Hop Songs (Billboard)	42
