= Say My Grace =

Single by Offset featuring Travis Scott

from the album Set It Off
- Released: October 13, 2023
- Length: 2:53
- Label: Motown
- Songwriters: Kiari Cephus; Jacques Webster II; Anderson Hernandez; Michael Mulé; Isaac De Boni; Maneesh Bidaye; Tom Levesque; Douglas Ford
- Producers: Offset; Vinylz; FnZ; Tom Levesque; Maneesh

Offset singles chronology
"Worth It" (2023)	"Say My Grace" (2023)	"Girls Gone Wild" (2023)

Travis Scott singles chronology
"I Know ?" (2023)	"Say My Grace" / "Likka Sto 2" (2023)	"At the Party" (2023)

Music video
- "Say My Grace" on YouTube

"Say My Grace" is a song by American rapper Offset featuring fellow American rapper and singer Travis Scott. It was released through Motown as the fourth single from Offset's second studio album, Set It Off, on October 13, 2023, along with the album. The song was produced by Offset himself, Vinylz, FnZ (Michael Mulé and Isaac De Boni), Tom Levesque, and Maneesh; the five wrote the song alongside Scott and Douglas Ford. On April 15, 2023, Offset and Scott both performed their own sets at Rolling Loud in Pattaya, Thailand, and Scott brought Offset out to perform the song with him for the first time ahead of its release.

== Composition and lyrics ==
On "Say My Grace", Offset and Travis Scott both rap about their luxurious items, with Offset rapping on the chorus: "Made room on my plate, I just said my grace and then I ate / Got a particular taste / I just stuffed my pockets and my face". In the first verse, Offset communicates with God as he reminisces the deaths of Takeoff and his grandmother, but he continues to push through: "Why I didn't get a answer? / Why I lose my brother to bullets? / Why I lose my grandma to cancer? / Why mе, God? I need answers". Scott takes the second verse, where he talks about his expensive lifestyle ("I filled up the crib with cars, the halls, with all and all, and I'm still having space / Got a particular taste, picky eater, I guess, but I'm still stuffing my face") and also references Takeoff ("I'm in a meditate state / Ever since we lost bro, ain't really much more I can take").

== Music video ==
The official music video for "Say My Grace", directed by Maya Table, premiered along with the song and album on October 13, 2023. Offset and Travis Scott shot it in Pattaya, Thailand at the Sanctuary of Truth Museum, Nong Noch Botanical Gardens, and the Pattaya Floating Market.

== Charts ==
Chart performance for "Say My Grace"
Chart (2023)	Peak position
Australia Hip Hop/R&B (ARIA)	32
Austria (Ö3 Austria Top 40)	70
Canada Hot 100 (Billboard)	30
Global 200 (Billboard)	63
Greece International (IFPI)	11
New Zealand Hot Singles (RMNZ)	3
Portugal (AFP)	195
Slovakia Singles Digital (ČNS IFPI)	60
Switzerland (Schweizer Hitparade)	41
UK Singles (OCC)	49
UK Hip Hop/R&B (OCC)	31
US Billboard Hot 100	48
US Hot R&B/Hip-Hop Songs (Billboard)	13
