= Sleazy Flow =

2021 single by SleazyWorld Go

Single by SleazyWorld Go
- Released: October 15, 2021
- Length: 1:51
- Label: SleazyWorld, Island
- Songwriters: Joseph Isaac; Robert McCoy Jr.
- Producer: Rage Santana

SleazyWorld Go singles chronology
"Let Me Talk My Shit" (2021)	"Sleazy Flow" (2021)	"Baghdad Flow" (2021)

Music video
- "Sleazy Flow" on YouTube
- "Sleazy Flow (Remix)" on YouTube

Remix cover
- Cover art of the official remix featuring Lil Baby.

"Sleazy Flow" is a single by American rapper SleazyWorld Go, released on October 15, 2021. It gained traction in late 2021 and is considered his breakout hit. Following its success, the song received an official remix featuring American rapper Lil Baby on May 26, 2022.

== Composition ==
The song is built around a piano-based, bass-heavy production, over which SleazyWorld Go raps about him using guns. The song heavily samples SpotemGottem's hit song Beat Box released in April 2020

== Remixes ==
American rapper NLE Choppa released a freestyle of the song in April 2022.

The official remix of the song was released on May 26, 2022, and features Lil Baby. In it, the two reflect on their wealth and status.

== Charts ==
=== Weekly charts ===
Weekly chart performance for "Sleazy Flow (Remix)"
Chart (2022)	Peak position
Canada Hot 100 (Billboard)	98
Global 200 (Billboard)	139
New Zealand Hot Singles (RMNZ)	35
US Billboard Hot 100	47
US Hot R&B/Hip-Hop Songs (Billboard)	9
US Rhythmic Airplay (Billboard)	24

=== Year-end charts ===
2022 year-end chart performance for "Sleazy Flow"
Chart (2022)	Position
US Hot R&B/Hip-Hop Songs (Billboard)	23

== Certifications ==
Certifications for "Sleazy Flow"
Region	Certification	Certified units/sales
Canada (Music Canada)	Gold	40,000^{‡}
New Zealand (RMNZ)	Gold	15,000^{‡}
United States (RIAA)	2× Platinum	2,000,000^{‡}
^{‡} Sales+streaming figures based on certification alone.
