= Jealousy (Offset and Cardi B song) =

Single by Offset and Cardi B

from the album Set It Off
- Released: July 28, 2023
- Genre: Hip hop
- Length: 2:54
- Label: Motown
- Songwriters: Kiari Cephus; Cardi B
- Producers: Oz; Boi-1da; Jahaan Sweet

Offset singles chronology
| "TBS" (2023) | "Jealousy" (2023) | "Fan" (2023) |

Cardi B singles chronology
| "Point Me 2" (2023) | "Jealousy" (2023) | "Bongos" (2023) |

Music video
- "Jealousy" on YouTube

"Jealousy" is a song by American rappers Offset and Cardi B. It was released through Motown as the lead single from Offset's second studio album, Set It Off, on July 28, 2023. The song was produced by Oz, Boi-1da, and Jahaan Sweet.

== Background ==
Following his announcement of being in "album mode" in March 2023, Offset shared a clip of a then untitled preview of a song along with a video on April 3. Months later, on July 26, Offset announced the single on his social media. Cardi B posted the single cover on her socials afterwards. It depicts the couple seemingly fed up with each other. The song's music video pays homage to the John Singleton film Baby Boy (2001) and the dysfunctional relationship between Jody and Yvette. Taraj P. Henson, who portrayed Yvette in the film, makes a cameo in the music video as a friend of Cardi B's character.

Offset previously teased the release two days prior by posting a spoof of an infamous 1988 James Brown interview on CNN. While Offset was dressed up as Brown, CNN host Sonya Friedman was portrayed by actress Jamie Lee Curtis.

== Charts ==
Chart performance for "Jealousy"
| Chart (2023) | Peak position |
|---|---|
| Global 200 (Billboard) | 144 |
| New Zealand Hot Singles (RMNZ) | 19 |
| US Billboard Hot 100 | 55 |
| US Hot R&B/Hip-Hop Songs (Billboard) | 26 |
| US Rhythmic Airplay (Billboard) | 25 |
