= Different Species =

2025 song by Offset and Gunna

Song by Offset and Gunna

from the album Kiari
- Released: August 22, 2025
- Length: 3:04
- Label: Motown
- Songwriters: Kiari Cephus; Sergio Kitchens; Thomas Kessler; Joseph McCue; Leon Krol; Jordan Walker
- Producers: X-Plosive; Jester; LnK

Music video
- "Different Species" on YouTube

"Different Species" is a song by American rappers Offset and Gunna, released on August 22, 2025 from the former's third studio album, Kiari. It was produced by X-Plosive, Jester and LnK.

== Composition ==
The song finds Offset performing in a staccato rhythm, while Gunna melodically performs in a nasal quality and "syrupy" cadences. In the lyrics, they boast about their luxurious, self-indulgent lifestyles.

== Critical reception ==
Mackenzie Cummings-Grady of Billboard placed "Different Species" at number seven in her ranking of the songs from Kiari, writing that the rappers' styles "perfectly complement" each other in a way that "creates a dynamic interplay that's hard to ignore." She added "While the subject matter treads familiar braggadocious territory, the sheer smoothness of their execution makes it hard to complain."

== Charts ==
Chart performance for "Different Species"
Chart (2025)	Peak position
Canada Hot 100 (Billboard)	90
South Africa Streaming (TOSAC)	14
Global 200 (Billboard)	183
US Billboard Hot 100	73
US Hot R&B/Hip-Hop Songs (Billboard)	13
