= Fan (Offset song) =

Single by Offset

from the album Set It Off
- Released: September 15, 2023
- Length: 2:36
- Label: Motown
- Songwriters: Kiari Cephus; Michael Mulé; Isaac De Boni; Travis Walton; Joshua Goldenberg; Leon McQuay III; Aaron Booe; Douglas Ford
- Producers: FnZ; Teddy Walton; Thank You Fizzle; Thurdi; Aaron Bow

Offset singles chronology
"Jealousy" (2023)	"Fan" (2023)	"Worth It" (2023)

Music video
- "Fan" on YouTube

"Fan" is a song by American rapper Offset. It was released through Motown as the second single from his second studio album, Set It Off, on September 15, 2023. Offset wrote the song with producers FnZ (Michael Mulé and Isaac De Boni), Teddy Walton, Thank You Fizzle, Thurdi, and Aaron Bow. On the song, Offset raps about getting rid of the toxicity that goes on in life and his flow is reminiscent to that of fellow American rapper Project Pat.

== Music video ==
The official music video for "Fan", directed by Offset himself, was released along with the song on September 15, 2023. The video is heavily influenced by late American singer-songwriter Michael Jackson as Offset tries to recreate his style by dressing up like him and trying to perform dance moves like that of what he did, especially taking inspiration from the musician's hit singles, "Thriller" and "Smooth Criminal". Offset had also previously compared himself to the musician in a statement while talking about his work ethic for the album and also has a tattoo of his face on his stomach. It features cameos by AMP members Kai Cenat and Fanum.

== Charts ==
Chart performance for "Fan"
Chart (2023)	Peak position
New Zealand Hot Singles (RMNZ)	18
US Bubbling Under Hot 100 (Billboard)	10
US Hot R&B/Hip-Hop Songs (Billboard)	49
