= Offset (rapper) =

American rapper (born 1991)

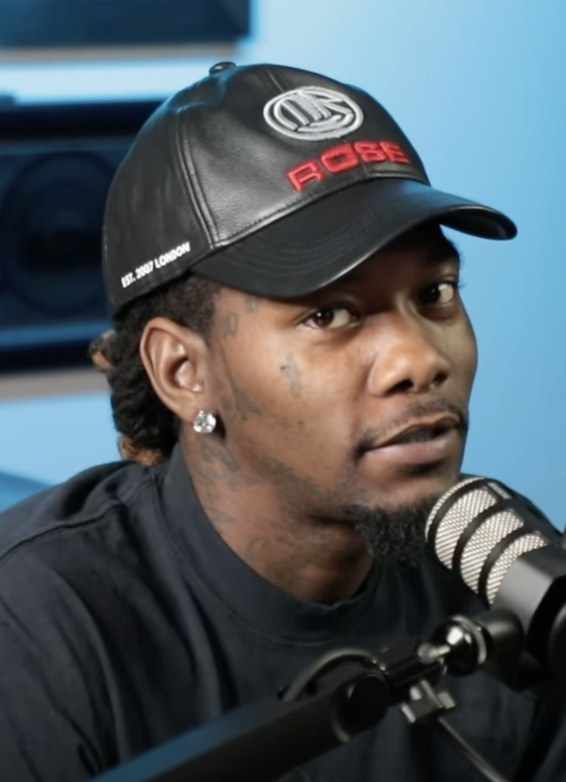
- Offset in 2025

Background information
- Born: Kiari Kendrell Cephus; December 14, 1991 (age 34); Lawrenceville, Georgia, U.S.
- Genre: Hip-hop
- Occupations: Rapper; songwriter
- Works: Offset discography
- Years active: 2002–present
- Labels: Motown; Capitol; Quality Control
- Member of: Migos
- Spouse: Cardi B (m. 2017; div. 2024)
- Children: 6
- Website: offsetofficial.com

Kiari Kendrell Cephus (born December 14, 1991), known professionally as Offset, is an American rapper. He is best known for being a member of suburban metro Atlanta-based hip-hop trio Migos. Formed with fellow rappers Quavo and Takeoff in 2008, the group released four commercially successful studio albums—Yung Rich Nation (2015), Culture (2017), Culture II (2018) and Culture III (2021)—before disbanding in 2023 and reuniting the group in 2026.

His marriage to fellow rapper Cardi B—with whom he has three children—has been heavily publicized; the couple separated in late 2023, filing for divorce in August 2024.

As a solo act, he first released the collaborative album Without Warning (2017) with record producer Metro Boomin and fellow Georgia-based rapper 21 Savage. It peaked within the top ten of the Billboard 200 and spawned the single "Ric Flair Drip," which peaked at number 13 on the Billboard Hot 100. He then guest appeared on Tyga's 2018 single "Taste", which became his first top ten hit on the latter chart as a soloist, and received diamond certification by the Recording Industry Association of America (RIAA). That same year, he appeared alongside Travis Scott on Kodak Black's single "Zeze", which peaked at number two on the chart.

Offset signed with Motown and Capitol Records to release his debut solo album, Father of 4 (2019). The album peaked at number 4 on the Billboard 200 and spawned the top 40 single "Clout" (featuring Cardi B), which was nominated for Best Rap Performance at the 62nd Annual Grammy Awards.

Offset and Cardi B's 2023 follow-up single, "Jealousy", peaked at number 55 on the Billboard Hot 100 and served as lead single for his second studio album Set It Off (2023), which released in October of that year. The album debuted at number 5 on the Billboard 200 and was accompanied by the single "Say My Grace" (featuring Travis Scott), which peaked at number 48 on the Billboard Hot 100.

His 2025 single, "Bodies" (featuring JID), peaked at number 72 on the Billboard Hot 100 and preceded his third studio album - self titled Kiari (2025), which included the single "Different Species" (featuring Gunna) that peaked at number 73 on the Billboard Hot 100. His mixtape Haunted by Fame (2025), a surprise release, failed to chart on the Billboard 200.

His fourth studio album, "GMFU", was released on November 13, 2026. The album was preceded by two singles, "Something I Need" and "Every Night" (featuring Don Toliver).

== Career ==
Offset was first a backup dancer in the music video for Whitney Houston's 2002 single "Whatchulookinat"; he was 10 years old at the time. Offset, along with fellow Migos group members, was born and raised in Gwinnett County, Georgia, adjacent to Atlanta. In 2008, Offset formed the Migos with Quavo and Takeoff.

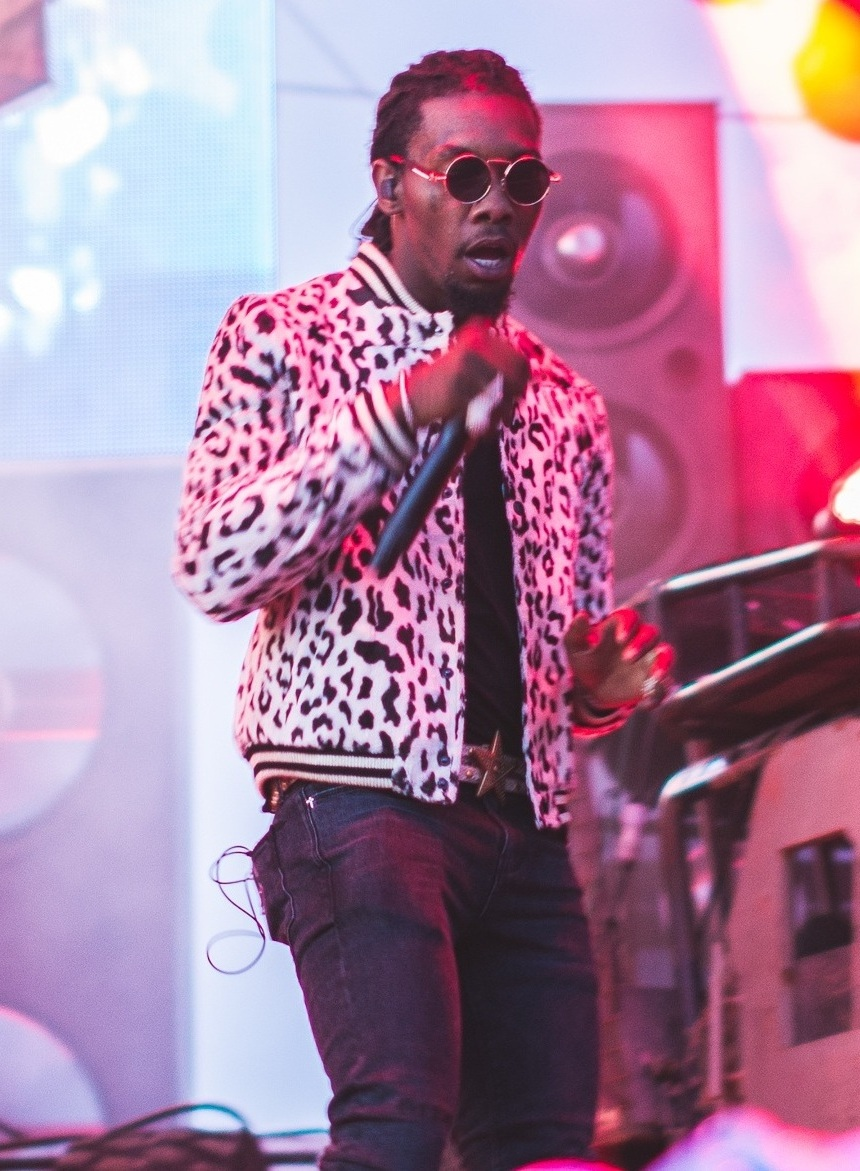
Offset performing at the VELD Music Festival in 2017

Migos initially gained recognition following the release of their 2013 single "Versace". In 2015, the trio released their debut studio album Yung Rich Nation. In 2017, their single "Bad and Boujee" became an Internet phenomenon, as much of the song was performed by Offset. The song peaked at number one on the US Billboard Hot 100 chart, with many critics believing Offset commanded the track. In 2017, the trio released their second studio album, Culture, which debuted at number one on the US Billboard 200 chart.

In addition to Migos, Offset has released solo music and collaborated with numerous artists. In June 2017, he was featured on Metro Boomin's single "No Complaints" alongside Drake, which peaked at number 71 on the Billboard Hot 100, and in September he joined Macklemore on the song "Willy Wonka", from the album Gemini. Offset would eventually release a collaborative studio album with rapper 21 Savage and record producer Metro Boomin titled, Without Warning. The album was released on October 31, 2017, and debuted at number 4 on the US Billboard 200 chart. It spawned the hit song "Ric Flair Drip", Offset's first solo platinum single, and highest charting US Billboard Hot 100 entry as a lead artist to date.

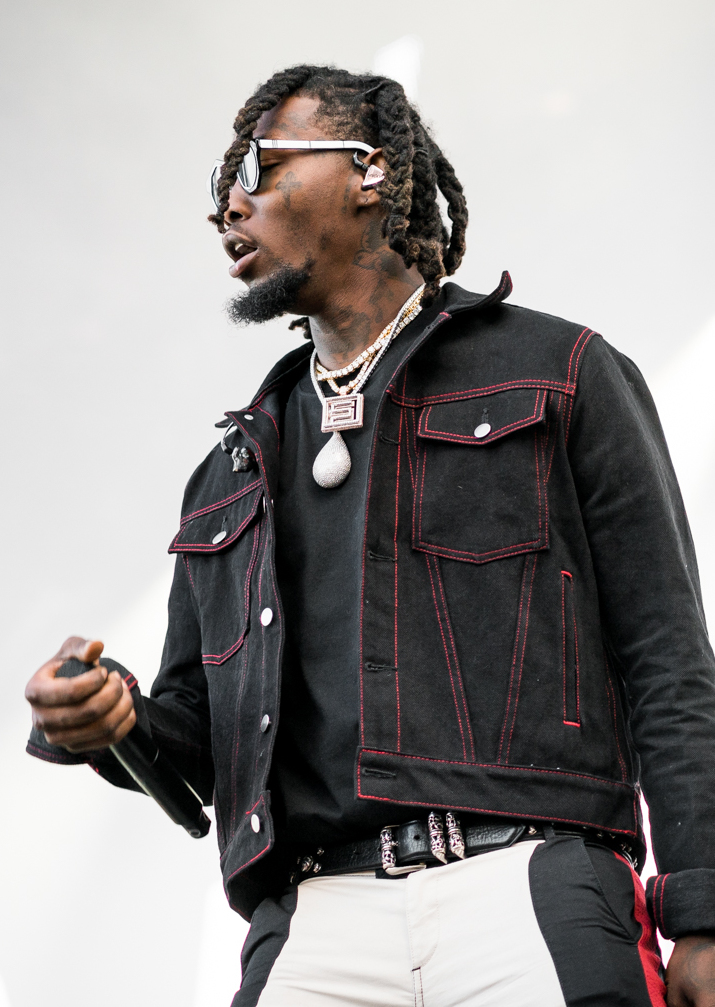
Offset performing at the Palmesus in 2018

In January 2018, Offset was criticized for rapping a line that includes the lyrics "I cannot vibe with queers" in his feature on YFN Lucci's "Boss Life". After the lyric was understood as homophobic he apologized saying he did not intend for his use of the term "queer" to be directed at the LGBT community. His wife, Cardi B, said that Offset did not know the term "queer" had a homophobic history. He has since claimed in an Instagram post that he assumed the lyric was using the definition of "queer" that is defined as eccentric and odd.

On February 22, 2019, he released his first solo album Father of 4. The album featured the single "Clout", with Cardi B, which peaked at the top 40 of the Hot 100 at number 39.

Offset was involved in a feud with Chris Brown whom he threatened to fight with in 2019.

Following the release of the fourth Migos album, Culture III in June 2021, Offset was featured on the soundtrack of Fast & Furious 9 on the song "Hit Em Hard" along with Trippie Redd, Kevin Gates, Lil Durk and King Von.

In May 2022, rumors surrounding a possible disbandment of Migos arose when Offset and his wife Cardi B unfollowed Quavo and Takeoff after the latter announced their new duo project, Unc And Phew and released the single Hotel Lobby (Unc & Phew).

In August 2022, Offset announced his second studio album and released two new singles, "54321" and "Code" with Moneybagg Yo, along with the music video featuring model Bella Hadid. Shortly after the release of "54321", Offset filed a lawsuit against his record label Quality Control Music in a dispute over rights to his solo music. His legal team said that he "paid handsomely" for his solo artist rights following the negotiation last year, but now QC has allegedly attempted to claim his latest track as its own.

In October 2022, disbandment of Migos became the subject of speculation based on reports that Offset had slept with Quavo's ex-girlfriend Saweetie. Following this, Quavo and Takeoff released a collaborative album titled Only Built for Infinity Links on October 7, 2022, without Offset's input despite no formal split. In an interview, Quavo stated that he would like to see his and Takeoff's career "as a duo".

On November 1, 2022, Takeoff was shot dead at the 810 Billiards & Bowling in Houston, Texas. Following the murder of his cousin and groupmate, Offset delayed the release date of his upcoming album which was originally going to be released on November 11, 2022.

On July 28, 2023, Offset released the single, "Jealousy" in collaboration with Cardi B, this single serves as the lead single off of his second studio album Set it Off, released October 13, 2023. The album was preceded with two more singles, "Fan" and "Worth It" with Don Toliver which was released a day before the album release. The album features guest appearances from Travis Scott, Future, Latto, Young Nudy among others.

Offset announced on his Instagram in March 2025 that he would perform in Moscow, Russia, despite his label Motown (owned by Universal Music Group) suspending all operations in Russia following the Russian invasion of Ukraine.

On June 20, 2025, Offset released the single "Bodies" in collaboration with JID, serving as the lead single for the album Kiari. On July 25, 2025, Offset released the single "Professional" for the album. On August 22, 2025, Offset released his third studio album, Kiari. The album features guest appearances from YoungBoy Never Broke Again, Gunna, John Legend, JID, Key Glock, Ty Dolla $ign, YFN Lucci and Teezo Touchdown.

While accompanying YoungBoy Never Broke Again on his MASA Tour, Offset developed the mixtape Haunted by Fame, which released on October 31, 2025. The project was unveiled as a surprise release, hitting platforms just two days after being announced. Although initially conceived as an album, Offset later clarified the project was a mixtape partially created to fulfill a contractual obligation with his label. The mixtape features guest appearances from YoungBoy Never Broke Again and NoCap.

On September 18, 2026, Offset released the single "Something I Need", followed by the single "Every Night" featuring Don Toliver, which released on October 8, 2026. The two songs were later revealed to be singles for Offset's fourth solo album, titled "GMFU", which released on November 13, 2026. The album featured guest appearances from Quavo, Gunna, Loe Shimmy, OsamaSon & ApolloRed1.

== Other ventures ==
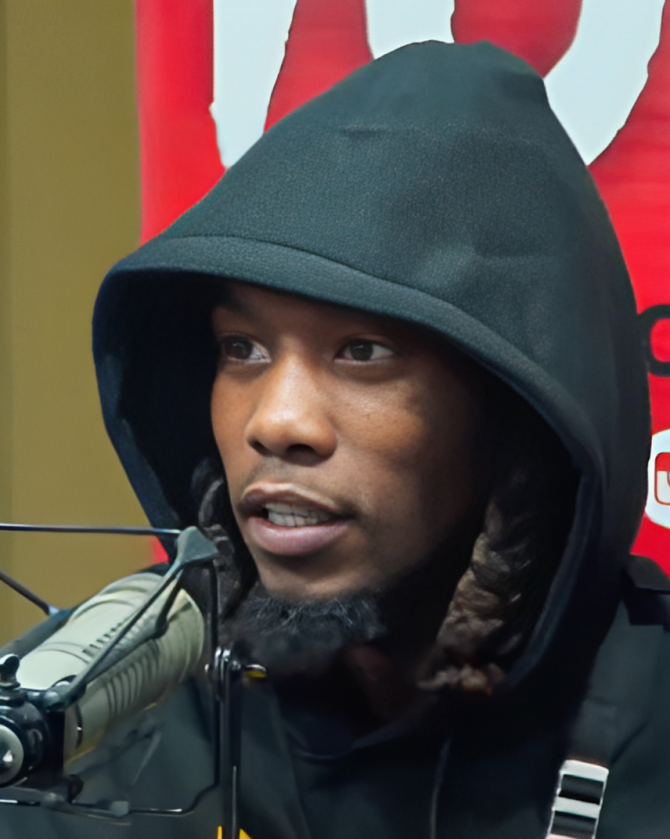
Offset during an interview in 2019

In 2016, Offset (including Migos) appeared in an episode of Donald Glover's series Atlanta. The episode aired on September 13, 2016, under the title "Go For Broke". He has also starred in campaigns for the fashion designers Gosha Rubchinskiy, Bryce Barnes, and Lavati.

In February 2019, Offset made his debut on Sean Evans' YouTube series Hot Ones.

In August 2019, it was announced that Offset invested in Esports organization FaZe Clan. Commenting on the investment he said "I love gaming and Esports is the future" said Offset in a release, "These two facts make it only right that I be a part of the biggest Esports organization with some of the best players in the world." He appeared in two FaZe Clan videos on YouTube.

Offset made his acting debut in NCIS: Los Angeles.

Offset has helped struggling artists by jointing Axis Replay in 2020.

Offset lost his grandmother to bladder cancer in 2012. He raised $500,000 for the American Cancer Society in 2022.

In October 2023, Offset collaborated with Howlin' Ray's to release the Howlin' Ween Offset Shake Box, a limited edition meal box that was exclusively available on Postmates and consisted of chicken nuggets and Offset's own sauce Southern Drip, which was inspired by a chicken dipping sauce that originated in North Carolina in the 1920s.

== Legal issues ==
When Migos first rose to prominence in 2013, Offset was incarcerated in Georgia's DeKalb County Jail for violating his probation that he had received due to prior felony convictions for burglary and theft.

On April 18, 2015, authorities stopped a Migos concert at Georgia Southern University and arrested all three members of the group, as well as several members of their entourage. Offset was denied bond and was charged with possession of an unspecified Schedule II narcotic, possession of marijuana, possession of a firearm in a school safety zone and possession of a firearm during the commission of a crime.

On May 2, 2015, Offset, while in custody, was charged with battery and inciting a riot within a penal facility after attacking another inmate, causing severe injury. In a bond hearing before Bulloch County Superior Court Judge John R. Turner on May 8, 2015, Offset was formally denied bond based on his prior criminal record as well as the jail fight. During the hearing, two members of Migos' entourage were also denied bonds while four others were granted bonds and were barred from returning to Bulloch County, Georgia as a condition of their release. Judge Turner directed the four who were released not to make contact with anyone involved in the case. Offset's attorney argued that the rap trio were unfairly profiled by law enforcement and that officers had failed to prove ownership of the firearms and illicit drugs found within the two vans. The prosecution responded that law enforcement were present at the concert for the safety of the students and public at-large due to Migos' history of violence. Upon hearing the decision, Offset shouted profanities as he was escorted out of the courtroom.

After eight months in custody, Offset was released on December 4, 2015, after accepting an Alford plea deal. The deal dropped the gun, drug, and gang-related charges in exchange for pleading guilty to inciting a riot within a penal facility, paying a $1,000 fine, serving five years probation, and being banished from Bulloch, Effingham, Jenkins, and Screven counties.

On March 17, 2016, Offset was arrested for driving with a suspended license but was released the next day without charges being filed.

On April 23, 2019, Offset faced a felony charge for possession of three handguns and the possession of drugs from a previous arrest in July 2018.

On October 24, 2020, Offset was detained by the Beverly Hills Police Department near a Donald Trump rally for carrying a concealed weapon. However, he was shortly released.

In 2021, Offset was sued by Platinum Transportation Group, a Los Angeles based car rental company. Offset reportedly rented a Bentley Bentayga from the company in May 2020, pushed back the return date multiple times, and after July 4, claimed the car was gone and had no idea where it was. According to PTG, Offset failed to provide any rational explanations regarding his failure to return the rental, and ceased rental payments after July 25.

== Personal life ==
In 2017, Offset started dating fellow rapper Cardi B. They married privately on September 20, 2017, and the latter became a stepmother to his three children from past relationships. They staged a public proposal the next month at a live performance at Power 99's Powerhouse in Philadelphia. In 2018, a video surfaced of Offset allegedly cheating with a woman in South Africa. An alleged sex tape also surfaced.

In May 2018, he was injured in a car crash.

On April 7, 2018, Cardi B revealed on Saturday Night Live that the two were expecting their first child together. On December 5, 2018, Cardi B announced on Instagram that she and Offset had broken up, after Offset allegedly had cheated on her during her pregnancy. Offset cheated on her with an aspiring rapper and model named Summer Bunni. He asked her and American rapper Cuban Doll for a threesome in leaked text messages. Offset was involved in another cheating scandal with 6ix9ine's girlfriend Jade in 2018. In 2018, Cardi B attacked two bartenders named Jade and Baddie G at a strip club. She accused Jade for sleeping with her husband Offset. Cardi B was charged with assault. The couple recorded and released the song "Clout", in 2019. In September 2020, it was reported that Cardi B had filed for divorce, but the next month they were said to be back together.

On June 27, 2021, Offset and Cardi B announced they were expecting their second child together. Cardi B gave birth to their second child, a son.

On November 1, 2022, Offset's groupmate Takeoff was shot and killed in Houston, Texas. Their group, Migos disbanded the following year. A 2023 interview with Variety clarified that Offset is not biologically related to Quavo and Takeoff but they have considered each other "cousins" since childhood.

Offset is the father of six children by four different women, the first four of whom appear in the cover art for his 2019 album Father of 4. One son was born to Justine Watson in 2009. In 2015, Offset fathered a son with Oriel Jamie, and a daughter with Shya L'Amour. He and Cardi B had a daughter in 2018 and a son in 2021. Cardi B filed for divorce from Offset on August 1, 2024, simultaneously announcing her pregnancy with her third and his sixth child, subsequently giving birth to their daughter, named Blossom, that September. According to DJ Akademiks, she allegedly cheated on him with an NFL player while pregnant, presumably Stefon Diggs. Offset alluded to her cheating while pregnant on Instagram live.

=== 2026 shooting ===
On April 6, 2026, Offset was shot near the Seminole Hard Rock Hotel and Casino in Hollywood, Florida. He was quickly transported to Memorial Regional Hospital. Offset’s representative stated his condition is “stable” and is “being closely monitored”. That evening, Tione Merritt, better known as Lil Tjay, was arrested in connection with the shooting. Merritt would afterwards be booked into Broward County Jail. A second person was also detained, but was not charged. On April 7, a statement was released by the Seminole Police Department which confirmed that Merritt was not only arrested, but was also "charged in connection with the incident that took place Monday night at a valet area outside of Seminole Hard Rock." The Seminole Police Department statement also confirmed that Offset's injuries from the shooting were non-life threatening.

Merrit would be released from jail on April 7, 2026. Rather than being charged with having involvement in the shooting itself, Merritt was confirmed to have been only charged with disorderly conduct, with police stating that “one of the males associated with (Lil Tjay) pulled a firearm and discharged it, wounding one of the individuals.” However, despite not directly shooting Offset, it was acknowledged that a group traveling with Merritt had in fact began brawling with Offset after getting out of a car when Merritt pointed at Offset, with Merritt then recording his group beating Offset on his phone.

In his first statement since the shooting, Offset, among other things, referred to Merritt as "a rat."

He was released from hospital on April 10, 2026.

== Discography ==
Studio albums

- Father of 4 (2019)
- Set It Off (2023)
- Kiari (2025)
- GMFU (2026)

Collaborative albums

- Without Warning (with 21 Savage and Metro Boomin) (2017)

== Tours ==
=== Headlining ===
- Set It Off Tour (2024)

=== Co-headlining ===
- Aubrey & the Three Migos Tour (as part of Migos - with Drake) (2018)

=== Supporting ===
- Nobody Safe Tour (as part of Migos - with Future) (2017)
- Make America Slime Again Tour (with YoungBoy Never Broke Again) (2025)

== Filmography ==
Television series
Year	Title	Role	Notes
2016	Atlanta	Himself	Episode: "Go for Broke"
2019	The Masked Singer	Himself	Cupcake
2020	NCIS: Los Angeles	Kadri Kashan Khan	Episode: "Alysiyadun"
2021	Baby Shark's Big Show	Offshark	Episode: "The Seaweed Sway"
2023	Baby Shark's Big Movie	Offshark	Voice role

== Awards and nominations ==
Award	Year (Note: Indicates the year of ceremony. Each year is linked to the article about the awards held that year, wherever possible.)	Recipient(s) and nominee(s)	Category	Result	Ref.
BET Social Awards	2018	Cardi B and Offset	Baewatch	Nominated	
Grammy Awards	2020	"Clout" (featuring Cardi B)	Best Rap Performance	Nominated	
