= Having Our Way =

2021 song by Migos featuring Drake

Song by Migos featuring Drake

from the album Culture III
- Released: June 11, 2021
- Length: 4:38
- Label: Quality Control; Motown
- Songwriters: Quavious Marshall; Kiari Cephus; Kirshnik Ball; Aubrey Graham; Tyshane Thompson; Nima Jahanbin; Paimon Jahanbin; Amir Stevie B; Jack LoMastro
- Producers: Wallis Lane; Azul Wynter; LoMastro; Preme

Lyric video
- "Having Our Way" on YouTube

"Having Our Way" is a song by American hip hop trio Migos featuring Canadian musician Drake. It was released on June 11, 2021, as the second track from Migos' fourth studio album, Culture III. The third collaboration between Migos and Drake, it is a boastful track about the rappers getting their way in all regards. The song received mixed responses from critics, with some praise directed at Drake and Takeoff.

== Background ==
Migos and Drake released multiple collaborations prior to "Having Our Way", established by their 2013 remix of "Versace". They also worked together on 2018's "Walk It Talk It", and various solo collaborations, including Quavo's feature on Drake's "Portland".

== Composition and lyrics ==
Financial Times's Ludovic Hunter-Tilney described the song's production as resembling "a brooding cinema soundtrack, subordinate to the star rappers in the acoustic spotlight". Lyrically, Quavo makes an apparent allusion to his ex, Saweetie, rapping "She had it her way, now she out of a Bentley", while following up with "she slimy, she sneaky/I'm takin' back that Bentley"; a possible reference to the "infamous" Bentley that Quavo gifted Saweetie for Christmas 2020. After their break-up in early 2021, it was reported that Quavo had the car repossessed. During Drake's "half-formed" hook and two-minute verse; he shows his allegiance to Nike by taking a shot at Adidas, with the line "I've been too solid to ever have stripes on my sneak's, you get what I mean?". He previously showed his distaste for the shoe brand, rapping "Checks over stripes" on Travis Scott's "Sicko Mode". Drake's dislike for Adidas stems from his potential signing to the company in 2018. However, this did not occur due to his feud with Pusha T, who had a deal with Adidas at the time of their feud. Drake also refers to basketball player Stephen Curry, whom he has a tattoo of. He acknowledges Migos, rhyming "'Set out here havin' his way / Qua' out here havin' his way / and like the third Migo, I Take[off]". Offset's line "Blue or the red Bugatti, this the Matrix" is a comparison to choosing the red or blue pill in the film The Matrix. Takeoff, meanwhile, reminisces on Migos and Drake's 2013 remix of "Versace": They know that I'm havin' my way (Why?) I was seventeen on a song with Drake".

== Critical reception ==
SOHH's Amaar Burton praised Takeoff, stating he "bodies his verse on the song and puts in his case for actually being the best Migo". Rolling Stone's Yoh Phillip's agreed, writing: "Drake's appearance on 'Having Our Way' has rightfully received the attention it warrants, but Takeoff's closing verse is spectacular". NME's Sam Moore called the track "triumphant", while BET's Dimitri Ehrlich deemed it a "classic": "Complimented [sic] by a standout feature from Drake, this song is a perfect example of the sonically satisfying way Migos uses the sound of close and imperfect rhymes (for example, the way 'circulation', 'matrix' and 'lavish' bang up against one another)". The New Yorker's Sheldon Pearce opined: They [Migos] can't stunt on Drake's level; on 'Having Our Way', he undermines their compressed performances with nonchalance, rapping in the laid-back singsong of someone lounging around during a high-end spa treatment". Writing for HotNewHipHop, Erika Marie said "It's always fire when Migos and Drake link up on a track". Conversely, Pitchfork's Paul A. Thompson lambasted Drake's appearance as "drab and interminable". Similarly, ranking Drake's feature seventh on Culture III, Audacy's Mya Abraham stated, "Drake may have had his way on this song, but he wasn't having his way with us".

== Commercial performance ==
"Having Our Way" debuted at number 15 on the Billboard Hot 100, the highest new entry for the week and the highest-charting song from Culture III.

== Charts ==
Chart performance for "Having Our Way"
Chart (2021)	Peak position
Canada Hot 100 (Billboard)	15
France (SNEP)	100
Global 200 (Billboard)	17
Ireland (IRMA)	57
New Zealand Hot Singles (RMNZ)	4
Portugal (AFP)	99
Sweden Heatseeker (Sverigetopplistan)	14
Switzerland (Schweizer Hitparade)	70
UK Singles (Official Charts)	49
UK Hip Hop/R&B (Official Charts)	15
US Billboard Hot 100	15
US Hot R&B/Hip-Hop Songs (Billboard)	5

== Certifications ==
Certifications for "Having Our Way"
Region	Certification	Certified units/sales
United States (RIAA)	Gold	500,000^{‡}
^{‡} Sales+streaming figures based on certification alone.
