= Avalanche (Migos song) =

Promotional single by Migos

Promotional single by Migos

from the album Culture III
- Released: June 10, 2021
- Length: 3:26
- Label: Motown; Quality Control
- Songwriters: Quavious Marshall; Kiari Cephus; Kirshnik Ball; Daryl McPherson; Norman Whitfield; Barrett Strong
- Producer: DJ Durel

Music video
- "Avalanche" on YouTube

"Avalanche" is a song by American hip hop group Migos, released on June 10, 2021 as a promotional single from their fourth studio album Culture III, which was released a day later. It was produced by DJ Durel.

== Background ==
Migos premiered the song on June 10, 2021 with a performance on The Tonight Show Starring Jimmy Fallon, in which they were dressed in matching black suits, sunglasses and fedoras and backed by a faux live band. The inspiration for the song was the streamer Kai Cenat's song "Bustdown Rollie Avalanche," which was released a year later.

== Composition ==
The song is built around a sample of The Temptations' cover of "Papa Was a Rollin' Stone". 808s form the instrumental as well. The song has no chorus; each member of the Migos raps a long verse, centering on their success and extravagant lifestyles. Quavo begins the song rapping about his childhood. Offset and Takeoff perform the next two verses respectively. The latter takes aim at rappers that copy Migos' rhyme pattern.

== Critical reception ==
The song received generally positive reviews. Mitch Findlay of HotNewHipHop called it "a smooth drop that once again finds all three members spitting solid verses with little time for catchy hooks", also writing, "It's especially welcome to see Quavo leading by example, coming through with another strong performance after 'Straightenin.' Should he be rapping at this caliber throughout the entirety of Culture 3, fans should be in for an enjoyable ride." Eddie Fu of Consequence called it "a reminder of the Atlanta trio’s lyrical dexterity". Bobby Carter of NPR regarded the song to be "the perfect statement piece to open part three of the Culture trilogy". Entertainment Weekly's Danny Schwartz described it as "a delightful and unexpected risk that echoes 'Stir Fry'". GQ's Caleb Catlin wrote, "It's meant to create dramatic tension for the rest of the album, and the sample of 'Papa Was a Rollin' Stone' is a little on the nose, especially when Quavo name drops it at the start of his verse. But cheesiness never hurt anyone if it's endearing. 'Avalanche' is an opening montage of sorts, showcasing Migos' greatest skills, and it makes you want to hear what else they have up their sleeve."

Jay-Z congratulated Quavo for the song and Culture III in a text message conversation.

== Music video ==
The music video was released alongside the song. It opens with Migos arriving in a vintage Rolls-Royce at a recording studio, where they perform the song in the same manner as their Jimmy Fallon performance. Meanwhile, a fictional interview takes place throughout the video. During each of their verses, Quavo, Offset and Takeoff talk about Culture III.

== Charts ==
Chart performance for "Avalanche"
Chart (2021)	Peak position
Canada Hot 100 (Billboard)	50
Global 200 (Billboard)	40
UK Singles (Official Charts)	90
US Billboard Hot 100	27
US Hot R&B/Hip-Hop Songs (Billboard)	12

== Certifications ==
Region	Certification	Certified units/sales
United States (RIAA)	Gold	500,000^{‡}
^{‡} Sales+streaming figures based on certification alone.
