= Big Booty =

Big Booty or Big Bootie may refer to:

- "Big Booty" (Cash Out song)
- "Big Booty" (Gucci Mane song)
- Big Bootie Mix
