= Culture III =

Studio album by Migos
- Released: June 11, 2021
- Genre: Hip-hop
- Length: 74:53
- Labels: Quality Control; Motown
- Producers: 808Melo; Atake; Azul Wynter; BGudini; Beam; Buddah Bless; Carnage; Ciaga; Danny Wolf; DJ Durel; Dun Deal; Fabio Aguilar; Gunboi; Jabz; Jack LoMastro; Jordan Fox; Joseph L'Etranger; Keanu Beats; Kid Hazel; Mars; Murda Beatz; Nas Moore; Nils; Nuki; OG Parker; Osiris; Oz; Pooh Beatz; Preme; Pvlace; Pyrex; Rasool Diaz; Rvnes; Quavo; Section 8; Slime Castro; Sluzyyy; Smash David; Sonic; Squill; Swirv; Tay Keith; Trauma Tone; Wallis Lane; Will Major; Zaytoven

Migos chronology
Culture II (2018)	Culture III (2021)

Singles from Culture III
- 1. "Need It" Released: May 22, 2020; 2. "Straightenin" Released: May 14, 2021

Culture III is the fourth studio album by American hip-hop group Migos. It was released on June 11, 2021, by Quality Control Music and Motown. The album features guest appearances from Drake, Cardi B, Polo G, Future, Justin Bieber, Juice Wrld, Pop Smoke, and YoungBoy Never Broke Again. It is the follow-up to their 2018 album Culture II and serves as the conclusion to their Culture trilogy. A deluxe edition was released six days later, including five additional tracks. It is the last album to be released in Takeoff's lifetime following his death in November 2022.

Culture III was supported by two singles: "Need It" and "Straightenin", as well as the promotional single, "Avalanche". The album received generally positive reviews from critics and debuted at number two on the US Billboard 200.

== Background and release ==
In October 2018, Quavo stated in an interview with the Associated Press that following his own recently released solo album Quavo Huncho, first Takeoff and then Offset would release solo efforts. When questioned on when new Migos music would arrive, he replied that Culture III would arrive "at the top of 2019", along with suggesting that a collaborative project between Migos and Canadian rapper Drake would be released after their touring together. On March 25, 2019, Takeoff stated that the album was on the way. On December 12, 2019, Offset revealed the album would be the last chapter in the Culture trilogy and that it included a song with late American rapper Juice Wrld titled "What's Brackin", only four days after Juice Wrld died from a drug overdose.

The album was delayed and rescheduled for release in early 2020. However, the album was pushed back again, due to the COVID-19 pandemic. Quavo spoke to Billboard in March 2020, announcing the trio's decision to hold off on releasing Culture III, explaining that it was largely due to their inability to properly roll out the album once social distancing rules went into effect in most states in the United States of America. Instead, the trio stated that they would first release a different project, titled Quarantine Mixtape, in the lead-up to Culture III. On May 22, 2020, while appearing on American rapper Lil Wayne's Young Money Radio show on Apple Music, Migos announced they would change the title from Culture III to another title. No release date was announced at that time.

On April 18, 2021, Quavo tweeted that mixing of the album had begun. On May 17, 2021, Migos announced that Culture III would be released on June 11, 2021. The release date was announced through a letter that they wrote as part of Quality Control, the label that they are signed to.

== Promotion ==
=== Singles ===
On May 22, 2020, Migos released the album's lead single, "Need It", featuring American rapper YoungBoy Never Broke Again. The song was produced by Buddah Bless. It peaked at number 62 on the Billboard Hot 100. The music video premiered on August 20, 2020.

On May 14, 2021, the trio released "Straightenin" as the second single, their first release in slightly less than a year. The song was produced by DJ Durel, Atake, Sluzyyy, Slime Castro, Nuki, and Osiris. It peaked at number 23 on the Billboard Hot 100. The music video premiered alongside the song.

=== Promotional singles ===
The album's lead promotional single, "Avalanche", was released on June 10, 2021, as well an accompanying music video. The song was produced by DJ Durel and Quavo.

== Critical reception ==
Professional ratings
Aggregate scores
Source	Rating
AnyDecentMusic?	6.6/10
Metacritic	75/100
Review scores
Source	Rating
AllMusic	3.5/5 stars
Clash	8/10
Entertainment Weekly	B−
Exclaim!	7/10
HipHopDX	3.4/5
The Line of Best Fit	9/10
NME	4/5 stars
Pitchfork	6.9/10
Rolling Stone	4/5 stars
Slant Magazine	3/5 stars

Culture III was met with generally positive reviews. At Metacritic, which assigns a normalized rating out of 100 to reviews from professional publications, the album received an average score of 75, based on nine reviews. Aggregator AnyDecentMusic? gave it 6.6 out of 10, based on their assessment of the critical consensus.

Robin Murray of Clash praised the album, stating, "A huge undertaking, Culture 3 is marked by its dense array of sonic reference points. It's a huge record, a panoramic thriller that places three incendiary MCs against a digital orchestra – an ambitious, lavish, and extraordinarily successful release". Reviewing the album for NME, Sam Moore stated, "Culture III is more focused than its exhausting 24-track-long predecessor, but a stricter edit here could've enhanced the experience even further". Yoh Phillips from Rolling Stone enjoyed the album, saying, "Culture III surpasses the sequel, and lives up to the greatness of 2017's brilliantly concise breakthrough Culture. One could argue that every song has a different MVP". Luke Fox of Exclaim! said, "The Migos formula works, to be sure. But it's those occasional reaches outside the tried and true – be it beats or collaborators – that make for a more compelling listen, even if they don't always smack the mark". Danny Schwartz of Entertainment Weekly wrote, "It isn't a slog, but it's closer in shape and spirit to the loose bloat of Culture II than the carefully sculpted gothic trap-pop opus Culture. Still, it is a satisfying listen". Ben Brutocao of HipHopDX said, "The beats are pleasant to excellent, the raps are practiced yet dry, and the trio that has come so far finds itself not moving at all".

AllMusic critic Neil Z. Yeung said, "While the set is a bit of a chore at 19 tracks (24 on the deluxe version), it's still not as bloated as Culture II. Yet, it could use some trimming if only to clear the clutter that distracts from the solid highlights". Writing for Pitchfork, Paul A. Thompson stated, "Like its predecessor, Culture III can become a slog, and at times seems shoddily constructed, its commercial ambitions ill-considered and to the album's detriment. It's also girded by songs that recall the Migos' inspired peak—and a couple that rank among their best". In a mixed review, Slant Magazine's Charles Lyons-Burt stated, "In all the excess, one is nonetheless left wanting more—better fleshed-out personas or a glint of a new stylistic direction rather than a doubling down on committee-tested beats and a formulaic approach. The end result is more diminishing returns for Migos's Culture series".

== Commercial performance ==
Culture III debuted at number two on the US Billboard 200 chart, earning 130,000 album-equivalent units (including 22,000 copies as traditional album sales) in its first week. The album also accumulated a total of 144.57 million on-demand streams of the album's songs during that week.

== Track listing ==
Culture III track listing
No.	Title	Writer(s)	Producer(s)	Length
1.	"Avalanche"	Quavious Marshall; Kiari Cephus; Kirshnik Ball; Daryl McPherson; Norman Whitfield; Barrett Strong	DJ Durel; Quavo	3:26
2.	"Having Our Way" (featuring Drake)	Marshall; Cephus; Ball; Aubrey Graham; Tyshane Thompson; Nima Jahanbin; Paimon Jahanbin; Amir Stevie B; Jack LoMastro	Wallis Lane; Azul Wynter; LoMastro; Preme	4:38
3.	"Straightenin"	Marshall; Cephus; Ball; McPherson; Ahn-tuan Tran; Chi Trieu; Kilian Mbelo; Latos Konstantinos; Tom Dettinger	DJ Durel; Atake; Sluzyyy; Slime Castro; Nuki; Osiris	4:15
4.	"Type Shit" (with Cardi B)	Marshall; Cephus; Ball; Belcalis Almanzar; Jorden Thorpe; Torae Carr; Shane Lindstrom; Brytavious Chambers; Darryl Clemons; Jacob Deimler; Rai'shaun Williams; Quentin Boehnke	Murda Beatz; Tay Keith; Pooh Beatz; Rvnes; Section 8; Ciaga	3:09
5.	"Malibu" (featuring Polo G)	Marshall; Cephus; Ball; Taurus Bartlett; Clemons; Nasir Moore; Rasool Diaz	Pooh Beatz; Nas Moore; Diaz; Mars	4:08
6.	"Birthday"	Marshall; Cephus; Ball; Samuel Jimenez; Josehua Parker; N. Jahanbin; P. Jahanbin	Smash David; OG Parker; Wallis Lane	3:47
7.	"Modern Day"	Marshall; Cephus; Ball; Lindstrom; Jordan Fox	Murda Beatz; Fox	4:01
8.	"Vaccine"	Marshall; Cephus; Ball; Tyron Douglas	Buddah Bless	3:41
9.	"Picasso" (with Future)	Marshall; Cephus; Ball; Nayvadius Wilburn; Denis Berger; McPherson	Pvlace; DJ Durel	3:32
10.	"Roadrunner"	Marshall; Cephus; Ball; Xavier Dotson; John Carrington, Jr.	Zaytoven; Trauma Tone	4:16
11.	"What You See" (with Justin Bieber)	Marshall; Cephus; Ball; Justin Bieber; Jerel Nance; Miguel Curtidor; McPherson	Danny Wolf; DJ Durel	2:59
12.	"Jane"	Marshall; Cephus; Ball; Chambers; Kevin Gomringer; Tim Gomringer; Diamanté Blackmon; Nils Noehden	Tay Keith; Cubeatz; Carnage; Nils	3:22
13.	"Antisocial" (featuring Juice Wrld)	Marshall; Cephus; Ball; Jarad Higgins; Lindstrom; Diaz	Murda Beatz; Diaz	4:22
14.	"Why Not"	Marshall; Cephus; Ball; Nance; McPherson	DJ Durel; Quavo	3:49
15.	"Mahomes"	Marshall; Cephus; Ball; McPherson; Gleb Protasov	DJ Durel; BGudini	5:08
16.	"Handle My Business"	Marshall; Cephus; Ball; Ozan Yildirim	Oz	4:37
17.	"Time for Me"	Marshall; Cephus; Ball; Lindstrom; Marcel Korkutata	Murda Beatz; Mars; Sonic	3:59
18.	"Light It Up" (with Pop Smoke)	Marshall; Cephus; Ball; Bashar Jackson; Andre Loblack; Patrick Newton; Keanu Torres; Fabio Aguilar	808Melo; Swirv; Keanu Beats; Aguilar	4:29
19.	"Need It" (featuring YoungBoy Never Broke Again)	Marshall; Cephus; Ball; Kentrell Gaulden; Douglas; Curtis Jackson; Tony Cottrell	Buddah Bless	3:15
Total length:				74:53

Deluxe edition (bonus tracks)
No.	Title	Writer(s)	Producer(s)	Length
20.	"How We Coming"	Marshall; Cephus; Ball; Lindstrom; Joseph L'Etranger	Murda Beatz; L'Etranger	3:49
21.	"How Did I"	Marshall; Cephus; Ball; Ahmar Bailey	Kid Hazel	4:25
22.	"New Money"	Marshall; Cephus; Ball; Gregory Sekeres; William Gaskins; William Valella	Will Major; Squill	4:53
23.	"Menace"	Marshall; Cephus; Ball; McPherson; Kedrick Cannady	DJ Durel; Pyrex	2:24
24.	"Working a Fool"	Marshall; Cephus; Ball; David Cunningham	Dun Deal	4:49
Total length:				95:13

iTunes Store edition
No.	Title	Length
25.	"Straightenin" (music video)	4:16
26.	"Avalanche" (music video)	3:58
27.	"Modern Day" (music video)	4:02
28.	"Need It" (music video) (featuring YoungBoy Never Broke Again)	3:15
29.	"Why Not" (music video)	3:50
30.	"Having Our Way" (lyric video) (featuring Drake)	4:38
31.	"Birthday" (lyric video)	3:47
32.	"Vaccine" (lyric video)	3:40
33.	"Roadrunner" (lyric video)	4:15
34.	"Handle My Business" (lyric video)	4:37

== Personnel ==
Credits adapted from Tidal.

Migos

- Offset – rap vocals
- Quavo – rap vocals
- Takeoff – rap vocals

Additional musicians

- DJ Durel – programming (1, 3, 9, 11, 14, 15, 23)
- Azul Wynter – programming (2)
- Beam – programming (2)
- Jack LoMastro – programming (2)
- Preme – programming (2)
- Wallis Lane – programming (2, 6)
- Drake – vocals (2)
- Atake – programming (3)
- Nuki – programming (3)
- Osiris – programming (3)
- Slime Castro – programming (3)
- Sluzyyy – programming (3)
- Shane Lindstrom – programming (4, 7, 13, 17, 20); bass, drums, piano, synthesizer (4, 13, 17); violin (13)
- Ciaga – programming (4)
- Pooh Beatz – programming (4, 5)
- Rvnes – programming (4)
- Section 8 – programming (4)
- Tay Keith – programming (4, 12)
- Cardi B – vocals (4)
- Mars – programming (5, 17); keyboards, synthesizer (17)
- Nas Moore – programming (5)
- Rasool Diaz – programming (5, 13)
- Polo G – rap vocals (5)
- OG Parker – programming (6)
- Smash David – programming (6)
- Jordan Fox – programming (7)
- Buddah Bless – programming (8, 19)
- Pvlace – programming (9)
- Future – rap vocals (9)
- Trauma Tone – programming (10)
- Zaytoven – programming (10)
- Danny Wolf – programming (11)
- Justin Bieber – vocals (11)
- Carnage – programming (12)
- Cubeatz – programming (12)
- Nils – programming (12)
- Juice Wrld – rap vocals (13)
- BGudini – programming (15)
- Oz – programming (16)
- Sonic – programming (17)
- 808Melo – programming (18)
- Swirv – programming (18)
- Pop Smoke – rap vocals (18)
- YoungBoy Never Broke Again – rap vocals (19)
- Kid Hazel – programming (21)
- Will Major – programming (22)
- Squill – programming (22)
- Pyrex – programming (23)
- Dun Deal – programming (24)

Technical

- Kevin "Coach K" Lee – executive producer
- Pierre "P" Thomas – executive producer
- Emerson Mancini – mastering engineer
- Manny Marroquin – mixer
- Chris Galland – mix engineer
- Jeremie Inhaber – assistant mixer
- Quavo – recording engineer (12, 13)
- DJ Durel – recording engineer (1–11, 14, 15, 16–24)
- Todd Hurtt – recording engineer (5)
- Max Lord – recording engineer (10, 12), recording arranger (13)
- Elijah Marrett-Hitch – recording engineer (11)
- Josh Gudwin – vocal producer (11)
- Buster Ross – assistant recording engineer (1–6, 8–12, 14–18)
- Heidi Wang – additional engineer (11)
- Hathan Smith – assistant recording engineer (20, 21, 22, 23, 24)
- Nick van Gelder – assistant recording engineer (20, 21, 22, 23, 24)

== Charts ==
=== Weekly charts ===
Weekly chart performance for Culture III
Chart (2021)	Peak position
Australian Albums (ARIA)	13
Austrian Albums (Ö3 Austria)	4
Belgian Albums (Ultratop Flanders)	7
Belgian Albums (Ultratop Wallonia)	8
Canadian Albums (Billboard)	3
Danish Albums (Hitlisten)	5
Dutch Albums (Album Top 100)	5
Finnish Albums (Suomen virallinen lista)	30
French Albums (SNEP)	5
German Albums (Offizielle Top 100)	15
Irish Albums (Official Charts)	10
Italian Albums (FIMI)	20
Lithuanian Albums (AGATA)	12
New Zealand Albums (RMNZ)	4
Norwegian Albums (VG-lista)	4
Spanish Albums (Promusicae)	52
Swedish Albums (Sverigetopplistan)	23
Swiss Albums (Schweizer Hitparade)	2
UK Albums (Official Charts)	9
UK R&B Albums (Official Charts)	22
US Billboard 200	2
US Top R&B/Hip-Hop Albums (Billboard)	2

=== Year-end charts ===
Year-end chart performance for Culture III
Chart (2021)	Position
US Billboard 200	95
US Top R&B/Hip-Hop Albums (Billboard)	43

== Release history ==
Release dates and formats for Culture III
Region	Date	Label(s)	Format(s)	Edition	Ref.
Various	June 11, 2021	Motown; Quality Control	Digital download; streaming	Standard	
Various	June 17, 2021	Motown; Quality Control	Digital download; streaming	Deluxe	
