= Need It =

Need It may refer to:

- "Need It", song by Kaytranada from Bubba, 2019
- "Need It" (Migos song), 2020
