= Last Name (disambiguation) =

A last name is the hereditary portion of a personal name.

Last Name may also refer to:

- "Last Name" (song), a song recorded by American country music singer Carrie Underwood
- "Last Name", a song from the album High Off Life by American rapper Future
- Death Note 2: The Last Name, 2006 Japanese supernatural thriller film
