= Stoner (song) =

Single by Young Thug
- Released: February 4, 2014
- Recorded: 2013
- Genre: Hip hop
- Length: 4:00
- Label: 1017 Brick Squad Records; Asylum Records; Atlantic Records
- Songwriters: Jeffrey Williams; David Cunningham
- Producer: Dun Deal

Young Thug singles chronology
"Stoner" (2014)	"Hookah" (2014)

Music video
- "Stoner" on YouTube

"Stoner" is a song by American rapper Young Thug. Released on February 4, 2014, as Young Thug's commercial debut single, the song is also featured on DJ Spinz's music compilation HPG 3 (2013). After gaining popularity, the song was made available through iTunes by Atlantic Records. The song is ranked as one of the 100 songs that defined the 2010s decade by Billboard.

== Music video ==
The music video for "Stoner", directed by Be El Be, was premiered on May 10, 2014. It features cameo appearances by fellow Southern hip hop acts, such as Birdman, Migos, Peewee Longway, Young Scooter, DJ Drama and Fabo.

== Composition ==
"Stoner" was produced by Dun Deal, and has a runtime of four minutes. It was written by Dun Deal and Young Thug.

== Commercial performance ==
The song peaked at number 47 on the US Billboard Hot 100 on the week of April 5, 2014. And at number 13 on the US Billboard Hot R&B/Hip-Hop Songs.

== Charts ==
=== Weekly charts ===
Chart (2014)	Peak position
Belgium Urban (Ultratop Flanders)	47
US Billboard Hot 100	47
US Hot R&B/Hip-Hop Songs (Billboard)	13

=== Year-end charts ===
Chart (2014)	Position
US Hot R&B/Hip-Hop Songs (Billboard)	48

== Certifications ==
Region	Certification	Certified units/sales
United States (RIAA)	Gold	500,000^{‡}
^{‡} Sales+streaming figures based on certification alone.
