= Hannah Montana (song) =

Single by Migos

from the album Y.R.N. (Young Rich Niggas)
- Released: November 26, 2013
- Recorded: 2013
- Genre: Hip hop; trap
- Length: 3:06
- Label: Quality Control
- Songwriters: Quavious Marshall; Kirsnick Ball
- Producer: Dun Deal

Migos singles chronology
"Versace" (2013)	"Hannah Montana" (2013)	"Fight Night" (2014)

Music video
- "Hannah Montana" on YouTube

"Hannah Montana" is a song by American hip hop group Migos, released on November 26, 2013, as the second single from their mixtape Y.R.N. (Young Rich Niggas) (2013). The song was produced by Southern hip hop producer Dun Deal. The song references American pop singer Miley Cyrus' Disney Channel character Hannah Montana, using the titular character of her show as a euphemism for cocaine and MDMA.

== Remix ==
The song was later remixed and dubbed the "Twerk Remix". This is the first song the group recorded with their fellow member Offset following his release from jail in October 2013.

== Music video ==
The official music video, directed by Gabriel Hart, was released on December 9, 2013.

== Chart performance ==
Chart (2013)	Peak position
US Hot R&B/Hip-Hop Songs (Billboard)	56

== Release history ==
Country	Date	Format	Label
United States	November 26, 2013	Digital download	Quality Control
