= Looking for You (Justin Bieber song) =

Single by Justin Bieber featuring Migos
- Released: May 29, 2014
- Recorded: February 2014
- Studio: Atlanta, Georgia
- Genre: Trap; R&B
- Length: 3:35
- Songwriters: Kevin Cossom; Justin Bieber; Quavious Marshall; Kirsnick Ball; Kiari Cephus
- Producers: Danja; Bangladesh

Justin Bieber singles chronology
"We Were Born for This" (2014)	"Looking for You" (2014)	"Foreign" (remix) (2014)

Migos singles chronology
"Fight Night" (2014)	"Looking for You" (2014)	"Handsome and Wealthy" (2014)

"Looking for You" is a song by Canadian singer Justin Bieber featuring American trap trio Migos. He shared the song through SoundCloud on May 29, 2014. Written by Kevin Cossom, Bieber and all three members of Migos, it was produced by Danja and Bangladesh. Lyrically, "Looking for You" describes Bieber in partying lifestyle and finding a lover while there at the party. It was the second song released on Bieber's SoundCloud in 2014, the previous being "We Were Born for This" a month earlier in April.

== Background and release ==
In early June 2014, shortly after the song's release, Migos told MTV about recording the song with Bieber, who visited them in February 2014: "He was in Atlanta, he came to our city and we linked with him. It wasn't no 'send' situation -- we [were] in the booth and working with him was pretty cool. He's laid back, he be chillin', he's a young nigga so it was fun. We knocked it out in about 20 minutes like we'd do any other track," they added. "It wasn't no pressure or nothing like that."

== Composition ==
The track describes Bieber entering a club with Migos at his side, finding a girl there who he is attracted to but cannot lose. He reminds her that he'll be looking for her because of this. Quavo, Takeoff and Offset take turns respectively rapping about pulling up to the club with Bieber, their lifestyle and their fame.
