= Handsome and Wealthy =

Single by Migos

from the album No Label 2
- Released: September 23, 2014
- Recorded: 2013
- Genre: Trap
- Length: 3:31
- Label: Quality Control; 300
- Songwriters: Quavious Marshall; Kirsnick Ball; Kiari Cephus; Darryl McCorkell
- Producer: Cheeze Beatz

Migos singles chronology
| "Looking for You" (2014) | "Handsome and Wealthy" (2014) | "One Time" (2015) |

"Handsome and Wealthy" is a song by American hip hop group Migos. It was released as a single on September 23, 2014 by Quality Control Entertainment and 300 Entertainment. The song was included on their mixtape No Label 2 (2014) and was produced by Cheeze Beatz.

== Commercial performance ==
The song peaked at number 79 on the US Billboard Hot 100 chart in November 2014. It charted for 8 weeks total.

== Music video ==
The music video for "Handsome And Wealthy" was released on September 9, 2014.

== Charts ==
| Chart (2014) | Peak position |
|---|---|
| US Billboard Hot 100 | 79 |
| US Hot R&B/Hip-Hop Songs (Billboard) | 20 |

=== Year-end charts ===
| Chart (2014) | Position |
|---|---|
| US Hot R&B/Hip-Hop Songs (Billboard) | 75 |

== Certifications ==
| Region | Certification | Certified units/sales |
|---|---|---|
| United States (RIAA) | Gold | 500,000^{‡} |
^{‡} Sales+streaming figures based on certification alone.
