= Straightenin =

Single by Migos

from the album Culture III
- Released: May 14, 2021
- Length: 4:16
- Label: Quality Control; Motown
- Songwriters: Quavious Marshall; Kirshnik Ball; Kiari Cephus; Daryl McPherson; Ahn-tuan Tran; Chi Trieu; Kilian Mbelo; Latos Konstantinos; Tom Dettinger
- Producers: DJ Durel; Atake; Sluzyyy; Slime Castro; Nuki; Osiris

Migos singles chronology
"Need It" (2020)	"Straightenin" (2021)

Music video
- "Straightenin" on YouTube

"Straightenin" is a song by American hip hop trio Migos. It was released through Quality Control and Motown on May 14, 2021, as the second single from their fourth studio album, Culture III. Straightenin was the Migos'; last single to be released before the death of their member Takeoff the next year in 2022.

== Background ==
In March 2021, Quavo previewed the song's music video on social media. The track and the accompanying video were released on May 14, 2021 with an announcement of the album Culture III.

Hong Kong rapper and producer Big Spoon accused Migos of copying his 2020 song "Magic Show 魔術表演", which he compared to "Straightenin" in an Instagram video, saying, "I composed and produced the song by myself, did all the rapping, and played all the instruments so there are no samples or loops taken from elsewhere. I tweaked their song to the same tempo and key for comparison."

== Composition ==
The song features "triplet flows and ad libs" quickly rapped over "booming bass, crisp percussion and a woozy synth line". Quavo mentions acting alongside Robert De Niro in the 2022 film Savage Salvation ("I'm counting dineros with Robert DeNiro / He telling 'em that Cho amazing"), and also raps, "Turn a pandemic into a bandemic / You know that's the shit that we on". Takeoff then raps, before Offset raps the third verse with a "silky flow talking about his days spinning the block."

== Critical reception ==
Althea Legaspi of Rolling Stone described the song as "classic Migos".

== Music video ==
The official music video for "Straightening" premiered along with the song on May 14, 2021. It was directed by Keemotion. The Migos are joined by friends and expensive items, such as luxury cars and vehicles.

== Personnel ==
Credits adapted from Tidal.

- Migos
  - Quavo – vocals, songwriting
  - Takeoff – vocals, songwriting
  - Offset – vocals, songwriting
- DJ Durel – production, songwriting, programming
- Atake – production, songwriting, programming
- Sluzyyy – production, songwriting, programming
- Slime Castro – production, songwriting, programming
- Nuki – production, songwriting, programming
- Osiris – production, songwriting, programming
- Manny Marroquin – mixing, studio personnel
- Chris Galland – mixing, studio personnel
- Jeremie Inhaber – assistant mixing, studio personnel

== Charts ==
=== Weekly charts ===
Weekly chart performance for "Straightenin"
Chart (2021)	Peak position
Canada Hot 100 (Billboard)	43
New Zealand Hot Singles (RMNZ)	8
Portugal (AFP)	170
UK Singles (OCC)	72
US Billboard Hot 100	23
US Hot R&B/Hip-Hop Songs (Billboard)	9
US Rhythmic Airplay (Billboard)	17
US Rolling Stone Top 100	25

=== Year-end charts ===
Year-end chart performance for "Straightenin"
Chart (2021)	Position
US Hot R&B/Hip-Hop Songs (Billboard)	59

== Certifications ==
Certifications for "Straightenin"
Region	Certification	Certified units/sales
Brazil (Pro-Música Brasil)	Gold	20,000^{‡}
United States (RIAA)	Platinum	1,000,000^{‡}
^{‡} Sales+streaming figures based on certification alone.
