= List of Billboard number-one R&B/hip-hop albums of 2020 =

This page lists the albums that reached number-one on the overall Top R&B/Hip-Hop Albums chart, the R&B Albums chart (which was re-created in 2013), and the Rap Albums chart in 2020. The R&B Albums and Rap Albums charts partly serve as distillations of the overall R&B/Hip-Hop Albums chart.

== List of number ones ==
Key
†	Indicates best-performing album of 2020

Issue date	R&B/Hip-Hop Albums	Artist(s)	R&B Albums	Artist(s)	Rap Albums	Artist(s)	Refs.
January 4	Please Excuse Me for Being Antisocial	Roddy Ricch	Merry Christmas	Mariah Carey	Please Excuse Me for Being Antisocial	Roddy Ricch	
January 11	JackBoys	JackBoys	Over It	Summer Walker	JackBoys	JackBoys	
January 18	Please Excuse Me for Being Antisocial	Roddy Ricch	Over It	Summer Walker	Please Excuse Me for Being Antisocial	Roddy Ricch	
January 25	Please Excuse Me for Being Antisocial	Roddy Ricch	Over It	Summer Walker	Please Excuse Me for Being Antisocial	Roddy Ricch	
February 1	Music to Be Murdered By	Eminem	Over It	Summer Walker	Music to Be Murdered By	Eminem	
February 8	Please Excuse Me for Being Antisocial	Roddy Ricch	Over It	Summer Walker	Please Excuse Me for Being Antisocial	Roddy Ricch	
February 15	Funeral	Lil Wayne	Over It	Summer Walker	Funeral	Lil Wayne	
February 22	Please Excuse Me for Being Antisocial	Roddy Ricch	Over It	Summer Walker	Please Excuse Me for Being Antisocial	Roddy Ricch	
February 29	Changes	Justin Bieber	Changes	Justin Bieber	Artist 2.0	A Boogie wit da Hoodie	
March 7	Still Flexin, Still Steppin	YoungBoy Never Broke Again	Changes	Justin Bieber	Still Flexin, Still Steppin	YoungBoy Never Broke Again	
March 14	My Turn	Lil Baby	Changes	Justin Bieber	My Turn	Lil Baby	
March 21	Eternal Atake	Lil Uzi Vert	Chilombo	Jhené Aiko	Eternal Atake	Lil Uzi Vert	
March 28	Eternal Atake	Lil Uzi Vert	Chilombo	Jhené Aiko	Eternal Atake	Lil Uzi Vert	
April 4	After Hours	The Weeknd	After Hours †	The Weeknd	Eternal Atake	Lil Uzi Vert	
April 11	After Hours	The Weeknd	After Hours †	The Weeknd	Eternal Atake	Lil Uzi Vert	
April 18	After Hours	The Weeknd	After Hours †	The Weeknd	Pray 4 Love	Rod Wave	
April 25	After Hours	The Weeknd	After Hours †	The Weeknd	The New Toronto 3	Tory Lanez	
May 2	Blame It on Baby	DaBaby	After Hours †	The Weeknd	Blame It on Baby	DaBaby	
May 9	38 Baby 2	YoungBoy Never Broke Again	After Hours †	The Weeknd	38 Baby 2	YoungBoy Never Broke Again	
May 16	Dark Lane Demo Tapes	Drake	After Hours †	The Weeknd	Dark Lane Demo Tapes	Drake	
May 23	Good Intentions	Nav	It Was Good Until It Wasn't	Kehlani	Good Intentions	Nav	
May 30	High Off Life	Future	After Hours †	The Weeknd	High Off Life	Future	
June 6	Wunna	Gunna	After Hours †	The Weeknd	Wunna	Gunna	
June 13	My Turn	Lil Baby	After Hours †	The Weeknd	My Turn	Lil Baby	
June 20	My Turn	Lil Baby	After Hours †	The Weeknd	My Turn	Lil Baby	
June 27	My Turn	Lil Baby	After Hours †	The Weeknd	My Turn	Lil Baby	
July 4	My Turn	Lil Baby	The Album	Teyana Taylor	My Turn	Lil Baby	
July 11	My Turn	Lil Baby	After Hours †	The Weeknd	My Turn	Lil Baby	
July 18	Shoot for the Stars, Aim for the Moon	Pop Smoke	After Hours †	The Weeknd	Shoot for the Stars, Aim for the Moon	Pop Smoke	
July 25	Legends Never Die	Juice Wrld	Life on Earth EP	Summer Walker	Legends Never Die	Juice Wrld	
August 1	Legends Never Die	Juice Wrld	Chilombo	Jhené Aiko	Legends Never Die	Juice Wrld	
August 8	No Pressure	Logic	Chilombo	Jhené Aiko	No Pressure	Logic	
August 15	Shoot for the Stars, Aim for the Moon	Pop Smoke	The Lion King: The Gift	Beyoncé & Various Artists	Shoot for the Stars, Aim for the Moon	Pop Smoke	
August 22	Legends Never Die	Juice Wrld	After Hours †	The Weeknd	Legends Never Die	Juice Wrld	
August 29	Shoot for the Stars, Aim for the Moon	Pop Smoke	After Hours †	The Weeknd	Shoot for the Stars, Aim for the Moon	Pop Smoke	
September 5	Shoot for the Stars, Aim for the Moon	Pop Smoke	After Hours †	The Weeknd	Shoot for the Stars, Aim for the Moon	Pop Smoke	
September 12	Shoot for the Stars, Aim for the Moon	Pop Smoke	After Hours †	The Weeknd	Shoot for the Stars, Aim for the Moon	Pop Smoke	
September 19	Detroit 2	Big Sean	After Hours †	The Weeknd	Detroit 2	Big Sean	
September 26	Top	Youngboy Never Broke Again	After Hours †	The Weeknd	Top	Youngboy Never Broke Again	
October 3	Shoot for the Stars, Aim for the Moon	Pop Smoke	Alicia	Alicia Keys	Shoot for the Stars, Aim for the Moon	Pop Smoke	
October 10	Shoot for the Stars, Aim for the Moon	Pop Smoke	After Hours †	The Weeknd	Shoot for the Stars, Aim for the Moon	Pop Smoke	
October 17	Savage Mode II	21 Savage and Metro Boomin	Anniversary	Bryson Tiller	Savage Mode II	21 Savage and Metro Boomin	
October 24	Shoot for the Stars, Aim for the Moon	Pop Smoke	Back Home	Trey Songz	Shoot for the Stars, Aim for the Moon	Pop Smoke	
October 31	Shoot for the Stars, Aim for the Moon	Pop Smoke	After Hours †	The Weeknd	Shoot for the Stars, Aim for the Moon	Pop Smoke	
November 7	Shoot for the Stars, Aim for the Moon	Pop Smoke	Featuring Ty Dolla Sign	Ty Dolla Sign	Shoot for the Stars, Aim for the Moon	Pop Smoke	
November 14	Pegasus	Trippie Redd	MissUnderstood	Queen Naija	Pegasus	Trippie Redd	
November 21	Shoot for the Stars, Aim for the Moon	Pop Smoke	After Hours †	The Weeknd	Shoot for the Stars, Aim for the Moon	Pop Smoke	
November 28	Pluto x Baby Pluto	Future and Lil Uzi Vert	Legend	Bob Marley and the Wailers	Pluto x Baby Pluto	Future and Lil Uzi Vert	
December 5	Good News	Megan Thee Stallion	Merry Christmas	Mariah Carey	Good News	Megan Thee Stallion	
December 12	Shoot for the Stars, Aim for the Moon	Pop Smoke	The Christmas Song	Nat King Cole	Shoot for the Stars, Aim for the Moon	Pop Smoke	
December 19	Shoot for the Stars, Aim for the Moon	Pop Smoke	The Christmas Song	Nat King Cole	Shoot for the Stars, Aim for the Moon	Pop Smoke	
December 26	Man on the Moon III: The Chosen	Kid Cudi	The Christmas Song	Nat King Cole	Man on the Moon III: The Chosen	Kid Cudi	

== See also ==
- 2020 in music
- List of Billboard 200 number-one albums of 2020
- List of number-one R&B/hip-hop songs of 2020 (U.S.)
