= Rich Nigga Timeline =

Mixtape by Migos
- Released: November 5, 2014
- Recorded: 2014
- Genre: Trap; gangsta rap
- Length: 79:59
- Label: Quality Control; 300
- Producer: Cassius Jay; Cheeze; Deko; DeeMoney; DJ Durel; Mario Beats; Murda Beatz; Phenom Da Don; StackboyTwaun; Swift Bangs; TM88; Zaytoven

Migos chronology
No Label 2 (2014)	Rich Nigga Timeline (2014)	Yung Rich Nation (2015)

Singles from Rich Nigga Timeline
- 1. "Wishy Washy" Released: January 6, 2015; 2. "Cross The Country" Released: February 2, 2015

Rich Nigga Timeline (censored, marketed as and on cover Rich Ni**a Timeline) is the fifth mixtape by American hip hop group Migos, released on November 5, 2014. Rolling Stone named Rich Nigga Timeline as the seventh Best Rap Album of 2014. It features production by Cassius Jay, Cheeze, Deko, DeeMoney, DJ Durel, Mario Beats, Murda Beatz, Phenom Da Don, StackboyTwaun, Swift Bangs, TM88 and Zaytoven.

== Track listing ==
All tracks are written by Quavious Marshall, Kirshnik Ball & Kiari Cephus.

No.	Title	Producer(s)	Length
1.	"Cross the Country"	Mario Beats	6:28
2.	"Rich Nigga Timeline"	Zaytoven	5:27
3.	"Can't Believe It"	Murda Beatz	3:54
4.	"Hit Em"	DJ Durel	3:44
5.	"Buyin Em"	Swift Bangs	4:04
6.	"Move"	Zaytoven	4:09
7.	"Pop That"	TM88	4:34
8.	"Came to Party"	DJ Durel	4:52
9.	"Bachelor"	Phenom Da Don	3:55
10.	"Naw FR"	Zaytoven	3:59
11.	"Story I Tell"	Murda Beatz	3:45
12.	"Nawfside"	Zaytoven	3:48
13.	"Ain't Mine"	Cheeze	4:14
14.	"Wishy Washy"	Cheeze	5:01
15.	"All Good"	Cassius Jay	4:19
16.	"Take Her"	Phenom Da Don; DeeMoney	4:36
17.	"What Y'all Doin"	StackboyTwaun	4:17
18.	"Struggle"	Zaytoven; Cassius Jay	4:53
Total length:			79:59
