= Y.R.N. (Young Rich Niggas) =

2013 mixtape by Migos

Mixtape by Migos
- Released: June 13, 2013
- Recorded: 2011 – April 2013
- Genres: Hip-hop; trap
- Length: 69:05
- Label: Quality Control
- Producers: C4; Dun Deal; EA; Juvie; Mack Boy; Mercy; MPC Cartel; Phenom da Don; Soulja Boy; Stack Boy Twaun; Zaytoven

Migos chronology
No Label (2012)	Y.R.N. (Young Rich Niggas) (2013)	No Label 2 (2014)

Singles from Y.R.N. (Young Rich Niggas)
- 1. "Versace" Released: July 8, 2013; 2. "Hannah Montana" Released: November 26, 2013

Y.R.N. (Young Rich Niggas) is the third mixtape by American hip-hop group Migos. It was released on June 13, 2013. The album features notable guest appearances from rappers Gucci Mane, Trinidad James, Riff Raff and Soulja Boy. This mixtape is notable for the single "Versace", the single reached number 99 on the US Billboard Hot 100 chart, number 31 on the US Hot R&B/Hip-Hop Songs chart, number 23 on the US Hot Rap Songs chart and number 11 on the US Top Heatseekers chart. "Versace" was placed in multiple year-end lists of 2013. Diplo included it in his 2013 round-up set on BBC Radio 1. XXL named it one of the top five hip hop songs of 2013. The official music video, directed by Gabriel Hart, was released on September 30, 2013. It shows Migos and Zaytoven at a luxurious mansion, wearing Versace clothes and accessories. The video also features a snippet of Migos second single off the mixtape "Hannah Montana". As of April 2021, it has gained over 36 million views on YouTube. Y.R.N. later reached number 74 on the US Top R&B/Hip-Hop Albums chart, their first mixtape to do so on the Billboard charts. The mixtape was premiered on LiveMixtapes, on June 13, 2013 and has over 7 million views and 500,000 downloads. Offset only appears on some of the tracks, he was incarcerated in 2013 when the mixtape released.

== Critical reception ==
Professional ratings
Review scores
Source	Rating
Spin	(8/10)
Pitchfork	(7.4/10)
Cuepoint (Expert Witness)	(3-star Honorable Mention)

Y.R.N. received favorable reviews from critics and was ranked as the third best mixtape of 2013 by Rolling Stone.

== Track listing ==
No.	Title	Writer(s)	Producer(s)	Length
1.	"(Intro) Rich Then Famous"	Quavious Marshall; Kirsnick Ball	Mercy	3:35
2.	"Chinatown"	Marshall; Ball	MPC Cartel	3:32
3.	"Versace"	Marshall; Ball; Kiari Cephus	Zaytoven	3:07
4.	"Chirpin"	Marshall; Ball	Stack Boy Twaun	3:43
5.	"Adios"	Marshall; Ball	Phenom da Don	2:44
6.	"Hannah Montana"	Marshall; Ball	Dun Deal	3:25
7.	"Bando"	Marshall; Ball; Cephus	Juvie	4:46
8.	"Cook It Up"	Marshall; Ball	Stack Boy Twaun	2:23
9.	"Fuck 12"	Marshall; Ball	Mack Boy	3:09
10.	"Bakers Man"	Marshall; Ball	Zaytoven	2:26
11.	"Finesser"	Marshall; Ball; Cephus	Phenom da Don	3:33
12.	"Pronto"	Marshall; Ball; Cephus	EA	4:26
13.	"FEMA"	Marshall; Ball; Cephus	Zaytoven	4:00
14.	"Jumping Out the Gym" (featuring Riff Raff and Trinidad James)	Marshall; Ball; Horst Simco; Nicholas Williams	Phenom da Don	4:46
15.	"YRN"	Marshall; Ball; Cephus	Zaytoven	3:57
16.	"Dennis Rodman" (featuring Gucci Mane)	Marshall; Ball; Radric Davis	C4	4:28
17.	"R.I.P"	Marshall; Ball	Zaytoven	3:27
18.	"Thank You God" (featuring Que)	Marshall; Ball; Quintin Square Jr.	Stack Boy Twaun	3:39

Y.R.N – Bonus track
No.	Title	Writer(s)	Producer(s)	Length
19.	"We Ready Remix" (featuring Soulja Boy)	Marshall; Ball; DeAndre Way	Soulja Boy	4:02
Total length:				69:05

== Charts ==
Chart (2013)	Peak position
US Top R&B/Hip-Hop Albums (Billboard)	74
