= Dun Deal =

American record producer from Georgia

- Born: David Maximillian Cunningham; August 19, 1986 (age 40); Atlanta, Georgia, U.S.
- Genres: Hip hop; trap
- Occupations: Record producer; songwriter; rapper
- Instruments: Logic Studio; FL Studio
- Years active: 2003–present
- Label: Hoodrich Entertainment APG

David Maximillian Cunningham (born August 19, 1986), known professionally as Dun Deal, is an American record producer, songwriter and rapper. He is best known for producing A$AP Mob's hit single "RAF", Young Thug's single "Stoner" and Migos' single "Hannah Montana". Cunningham has also worked with Gucci Mane, Usher, Trey Songz, Future, YoungBoy Never Broke Again, Rich Homie Quan, and Kevin Gates, among others. He is signed to Artist Publishing Group.

== Early life and career ==
Deal started his career as a rapper in 2003, when he formed the group O Boys with his high school friends. They were signed with one of Ruff Ryders' sub-labels. He used the money he received from the label to buy studio equipment and started learning how to create beats. By 2005, Deal had moved from rapping to producing. His first major production work was one of Tyler Perry's movies.

In about 2007, Deal started producing for artists, such as Rich Kidz, Future, Cash Out, Young Thug and Dem Franchize Boyz. He had a studio in downtown Atlanta and was working with a production team called Planet 9.

In 2012, while producing on Rich Kidz's album Everybody Eat Bread, Deal signed to DJ Spinz's production team Hoodrich Production Group (HPG), which also includes C4, S.O.S and Childish Major.

In 2013, Deal gained recognition for producing Migos' single "Hannah Montana". According to Deal, when Spinz was in a recording session with Migos, he contacted Deal and requested some instrumentals. the song was recorded. Deal sent back a beat which he had created about two years before, and Migos recorded what would turn to be "Hannah Montana" in about 30 minutes. Deal was initially skeptical about the song's title, but the song became a hit. In October 2013, Deal was included on Complex's list "25 New Producers To Watch For". The list author Craig Jenkins commented that "his beats [are] the emotional focal points of whatever album he's on, and his restless versatility ensures we'll be hearing his name a lot more in the years to come." In January 2014, Deal, among his team HPG, was also included on FACT's "10 hip-hop producers to watch in 2014". FACT authors Chris Kelly and John Twells stated that "the group's sound defined 2013 with a diverse set of productions".

In early 2014, Young Thug's "Stoner", produced by Deal, got mainstream popularity, and peaked at number 47 on the Billboard Hot 100. The song also spawned a number of unofficial remixes by rappers, such as Wale, Jim Jones, Jadakiss, Iamsu! and Trick-Trick. Deal, who has been working with Young Thug, since the rapper was 16 years old, revealed that it took him 15 minutes to create the instrumental for "Stoner" and Thug recorded the whole song in another 15 minutes, mostly freestyling. Later, he commented on the success of the song: "I'm definitely always surprised when a song takes off like that. You know, you expect it to be a hit when you think it's a good song and you make it yourself, but you never know it's gonna be a really big hit."

On April 30, 2014, Deal released a collaboration EP with rapper Rome Fortune, titled Drive, Thighs & Lies. Deal is also working on a compilation mixtape, called BASS (Below a Silver Sky), which is set for a release during 2014.

that same year he sign 2 young producers Isaac Flame and Goose who produced, 9 tracks of Rich Gang: Tha Tour Pt. 1 Mixtape Rich Gang: Tha Tour Pt. 1 in 2015 he partnered up with P.Kaldone Ceo of MafiaSoul Records LLC, and the 2 opened a studio in Atlanta alongside fame producer Bangladesh, where they started developing young artist such has Ray Moon Vory, Kellz, who's currently sign to Kobalt Music Publishing, and Arius who on June 15, 2017, released her first EP "Pandora's Box”.

== Musical style ==
Gabriel Herrera of Vice described Deal as "a driving force behind a number of huge hits on the southern mixtape circuit, Top 40 radio, and everything in between." In an interview with MercyHope, Deal commented on his musical growth, saying: "there was a certain sound I felt like I was missing when I first started. And the more I did it every day, I started to catch that formula to make those type of songs where they could be on the radio."

Deal uses Logic Studio to create his music, and sometimes also plays live instruments: a guitar, a grand piano and drums. Like many hip-hop producers, Deal uses a musical signature on the instrumentals he creates, which consists of the phrase "Dun Deal on the Track", followed by a pitched-up vocal effect. The tag was originally recorded by Skool Boy from the Rich Kidz.

== Discography ==
=== EP ===
- Drive, Thighs & Lies (with Rome Fortune) (2014)

=== Mixtapes ===
- World War 3: Molly (with Gucci Mane, Metro Boomin, Sonny Digital, and C4) (2013)
- B.A.S.S. (Below a Silver Sky) (2014)

== Production discography ==
=== Singles produced ===
List of singles as either producer or co-producer that have charted or been certified
Title	Year	Peak chart positions					Certifications	Album
Title	Year	US	US R&B	US Rap	CAN	NZ	Certifications	Album
"Hannah Montana" (Migos)	2013	—	56	—	—	—		Y.R.N. (Young Rich Niggas)
"Stoner" (Young Thug)	2014	47	13	5	—	—	RIAA: Gold	Non-album single
"She Twerkin" (Cash Out)	2014	98	28	17	—	—	RIAA: Gold	Let's Get It
"Buried Alive" (Logic)	2014	—	—	—	—	—	RIAA: Gold	Under Pressure
"Raf" (ASAP Mob featuring ASAP Rocky, Playboi Carti, Quavo, Lil Uzi Vert and Frank Ocean)	2017	— (Note: "Raf" did not chart on the Billboard Hot 100, but peaked at number 18 on the Bubbling Under Hot 100 Singles chart.)	—	—	82	— (Note: "Raf" did not chart on the Official New Zealand Music Chart, but peaked at number 5 on the New Zealand Heatseekers Singles chart.)	RIAA: Platinum; ARIA: Gold	Cozy Tapes Vol. 2: Too Cozy
"—" denotes a recording that did not chart or was not released in that territory.

=== Other charted and certified songs ===
List of singles as either producer or co-producer
Title	Year	Peak chart positions					Certifications	Album
Title	Year	US	US R&B	US Rap	CAN	NZ	Certifications	Album
"Stop Lyin'" (Kevin Gates)	2014	—	—	—	—	—	RIAA: Platinum	By Any Means
"Cake" (Trey Songz)	2014	—	—	—	—	—	RIAA: Gold	Trigga
"Gravity" (YoungBoy Never Broke Again)	2016	—	—	—	—	—	RIAA: Gold	38 Baby
"Two Face" (YNW Melly)	2021	— (Note: "Two Face" did not enter the Billboard Hot 100, but peaked at number 22 on the Bubbling Under Hot 100 chart.)	—	—	—	—		Melly vs. Melvin
"—" denotes a recording that did not chart or was not released in that territory.
