= Let's Get It (Cash Out album) =

Studio album by Cash Out
- Released: August 26, 2014
- Recorded: Blue Room Studios; HPG Studios; UAMG Studios
- Genre: Hip-hop
- Length: 43:31
- Label: Bases Loaded; eOne
- Producer: Cash Out; DJ Montay; DJ Spinz; Dun Deal; Inomek; Metro Boomin; Southside; K.E. on the Track; TM88

Singles from Let's Get It
- 1. "She Twerkin" Released: February 25, 2014; 2. "Mexico" Released: April 22, 2014; 3. "She Wanna Ride" Released: August 5, 2014

Let's Get It is the only studio album by American hip-hop recording artist Cash Out. It was released on August 26, 2014, by Bases Loaded Records and eOne Music. The album features guest appearances from Wiz Khalifa, Ty Dolla Sign, French Montana, Shanell, Rich Homie Quan and Waka Flocka Flame. It was supported by the singles, "She Twerkin", "Mexico", and "She Wanna Ride".

== Singles ==
- The album's lead single, "She Twerkin" was released on February 25, 2014. The song peaked at number 98 on the US Billboard Hot 100, making it his second overall Hot 100 entry.
- The album's second single, "Mexico" was released on April 22, 2014.
- The album's third single, "She Wanna Ride" featuring Shanell, was released on August 5, 2014.

== Critical reception ==
Professional ratings
Review scores
Source	Rating
AllMusic	3/5 stars

The album was met with positive reviews, David Jeffries of AllMusic said Let's Get It takes the lightheaded and lighthearted club hit "She Twerkin" and blows it up to an album, as "Stunt on Ya Haters" and "She Wanna Ride" come packaged in the same mix of stoned and slick. "Mexico" introduces the rapper's ridiculous Latino accent imitation, which pops up like a weird Speedy Gonzales character throughout the LP, while the well-chosen guest list of French Montana, Waka Flocka Flame, and Rich Homie Quan are all simpatico with the hardcore yet hedonistic world of Ca$h Out.

== Track listing ==
Album credits adapted from official liner notes.

No.	Title	Writer(s)	Producer(s)	Length
1.	"Let’s Get It"	John-Michael Gibson; Gary Hill	DJ Spinz	4:10
2.	"She Twerkin"	Gibson; Hill; David Cunningham	DJ Spinz; Dun Deal	2:52
3.	"I’m Sorry" (featuring French Montana)	Gibson; Joshua Luellen; Leland Wayne	Southside; Metro Boomin	3:37
4.	"Mexico"	Gibson; Montay Humphrey	DJ Montay	3:32
5.	"She Wanna Ride" (featuring Shanell)	Gibson; Luellen; Bryan Simmons	Southside; TM88	3:58
6.	"Juice"	Gibson; Luellen; Simmons	Southside; TM88	3:56
7.	"I Want the Money"	Gibson; Kemoni Watts	Cash Out; Inomek	4:15
8.	"Cookin It Up" (featuring Rich Homie Quan)	Gibson; Wayne; Hill	Metro Boomin; DJ Spinz	3:40
9.	"She Wit It"	Gibson; Watts	Cash Out; Inomek	2:39
10.	"Stunt on Ya Haters" (featuring Waka Flocka Flame)	Gibson; Luellen; Hill	Southside; DJ Spinz	4:03
11.	"2Day"	Gibson; Luellen; Simmons	Southside; TM88	3:40
12.	"Startin Tonight"	Gibson; Kevin Erondu	K.E. on the Track	3:09

=== Notes ===
- "Let's Get It" features uncredited vocals by Ty Dolla Sign and Wiz Khalifa.

== Charts ==
Chart (2014)	Peak position
US Billboard 200	43
US Top R&B/Hip-Hop Albums (Billboard)	8
US Top Rap Albums (Billboard)	4

== Release history ==
Region	Date	Format(s)	Label
United States	August 26, 2014	CD, digital download	Bases Loaded, eOne
