= She Twerkin =

Single by Cash Out

from the album Let's Get It
- Released: February 25, 2014
- Recorded: 2013
- Genre: Dirty rap, trap
- Length: 2:52
- Label: Bases Loaded, eOne
- Songwriters: John Gibson; Gary Rafael Hill; David Cunningham
- Producers: DJ Spinz; Dun Deal

Cash Out singles chronology
"Hold Up" (2012)	"She Twerkin" (2014)

"She Twerkin" (originally titled "The Twerk Song") is a song by American rapper Cash Out. It was released on February 25, 2014, as the lead single for his debut studio album Let's Get It (2014). The song peaked at number 98 on the Billboard Hot 100, making it Cash Out's second overall Hot 100 entry. The official remix features Juicy J, Lil Boosie, Ty Dolla Sign and Kid Ink.

== Chart performances ==
=== Weekly charts ===
Chart (2014)	Peak position
US Billboard Hot 100	98
US Hot R&B/Hip-Hop Songs (Billboard)	28
US Hot Rap Songs (Billboard)	17

=== Year-end charts ===
Chart (2014)	Position
US Hot R&B/Hip-Hop Songs (Billboard)	70

== Certifications ==
Region	Certification	Certified units/sales
United States (RIAA)	Gold	500,000^{‡}
^{‡} Sales+streaming figures based on certification alone.
