= Life Is Good (song) =

Single by Future featuring Drake

from the album High Off Life
- Released: January 10, 2020
- Recorded: 2019
- Genre: Trap
- Length: 3:57
- Label: Freebandz; Epic
- Songwriters: Nayvadius Wilburn; Aubrey Graham; Darius Hill; Ozan Yıldırım; Mathias Liyew
- Producers: D. Hill; OZ; Ambezza

Future singles chronology
"Last Name" (2019)	"Life Is Good" (2020)	"Dead Man Walking" (2020)

Drake singles chronology
"Loyal" (2019)	"Life Is Good" (2020)	"Oprah's Bank Account" (2020)

Music video
- "Life Is Good" on YouTube

"Life Is Good" is a song by American rapper Future featuring Canadian rapper Drake. It was released on January 10, 2020, and later confirmed to be the third single from the former's eighth studio album High Off Life.

It debuted and peaked at number two on the US Billboard Hot 100 and became the first song ever to spend its first eight weeks at that position, behind Roddy Ricch's "The Box". It was Future's highest-charting song as a lead artist and his highest-charting song overall, until the releases of "Way 2 Sexy" (with Young Thug) and "Wait 4 U" (with Tems), two more collaborations between Future and Drake that both debuted at the top of the charts. The track sold 9 million units in the US by March 3, 2021. The song was certified diamond by the RIAA on November 22, 2021, for selling over 10 million units in the United States.

== Background and music video ==
In late December 2019, Future and Drake were spotted in Atlanta, Georgia, filming a music video in a McDonald's location, leading to the belief that the two had a forthcoming collaboration. The shoot included recording artists such as 21 Savage, Mike Will Made-It, Lil Yachty and Big Bank Black. Word of the video spread when media personality DJ Akademiks posted the casting call for the video. Future had previously posted a snippet of what the duo were working on in his Instagram story.

The song and music video, directed by Julien Christian Lutz (Director X) were released at midnight on January 10. The music video depicts Future and Drake as men with ordinary jobs, including fast food workers, mechanics, IT workers, off-brand Apple Store employees, garbage men, chefs, aspiring rappers, and assistant directors. As of April 2025, the music video has amassed a total of 2.2 billion views on YouTube.

== Remix ==
On February 15, 2020, a remix of the song was released by Future featuring Drake and American rappers DaBaby and Lil Baby. Three days prior to the release, Future teased DaBaby and Lil Baby's vocals on an Instagram story. The remix is featured on Future's eighth studio album High Off Life, along with the original version.

A remix of the song was released by Lil Wayne off his mixtape No Ceilings 3.

== Reception ==
Jason Lipshutz of Billboard wrote that structuring the song in two halves—Drake performing the first half and Future performing the latter, each with a different beat—was reminiscent of Drake's previous feature on Travis Scott's 2018 hit "Sicko Mode". The review praised how the artists' styles complemented each other as they did on their joint mixtape in 2015. XXL described the production and instrumentation as "dreamy chords with a mid-tempo vibe".

== Personnel ==
Credits adapted from Tidal.

- Future – principal vocalist, songwriting
- Drake – featured vocalist, songwriting
- D. Hill – production, songwriting
- OZ – production, songwriting
- Ambezza – co-production, songwriting
- Colin Leonard – mastering engineer
- DaBaby – featured vocalist, songwriting (remix)
- Lil Baby – featured vocalist, songwriting (remix)
- Maudell Watkins – songwriting (remix)

== Charts ==
=== Weekly charts ===
Chart (2020)	Peak position
Australia (ARIA)	11
Austria (Ö3 Austria Top 40)	8
Belgium (Ultratop 50 Flanders)	45
Belgium (Ultratip Bubbling Under Wallonia)	4
Canada Hot 100 (Billboard)	3
Czech Republic Singles Digital (ČNS IFPI)	24
Denmark (Tracklisten)	10
Estonia (Eesti Tipp-40)	8
Finland (Suomen virallinen lista)	14
France (SNEP)	33
Germany (GfK)	8
Global 200 (Billboard)	39
Greece (IFPI)	13
Hungary (Single Top 40)	24
Hungary (Stream Top 40)	12
Iceland (Tónlistinn)	14
Ireland (IRMA)	5
Italy (FIMI)	36
Lithuania (AGATA)	7
Netherlands (Dutch Top 40 Tipparade)	2
Netherlands (Single Top 100)	19
New Zealand (Recorded Music NZ)	13
Norway (VG-lista)	9
Portugal (AFP)	6
Romania (Airplay 100)	57
Scottish Singles Sales (Official Charts)	48
Singapore (RIAS)	27
Slovakia Singles Digital (ČNS IFPI)	19
Spain (PROMUSICAE)	79
Sweden (Sverigetopplistan)	23
Switzerland (Schweizer Hitparade)	3
UK Singles (Official Charts)	3
US Billboard Hot 100	2
US Hot R&B/Hip-Hop Songs (Billboard)	2
US Pop Airplay (Billboard)	28
US Rhythmic Airplay (Billboard)	1
US Rolling Stone Top 100	2

Remix

Chart (2020)	Peak position
New Zealand Hot Singles (RMNZ)	20

=== Year-end charts ===
Chart (2020)	Position
Australia (ARIA)	39
Austria (Ö3 Austria Top 40)	47
Canada (Canadian Hot 100)	22
Denmark (Tracklisten)	61
France (SNEP)	112
Germany (Official German Charts)	79
Hungary (Stream Top 40)	47
Ireland (IRMA)	22
Netherlands (Single Top 100)	87
New Zealand (Recorded Music NZ)	40
Sweden (Sverigetopplistan)	92
Switzerland (Schweizer Hitparade)	38
UK Singles (OCC)	22
US Billboard Hot 100	7
US Hot R&B/Hip-Hop Songs (Billboard)	4
US Rhythmic (Billboard)	9
Worldwide (IFPI)	6

Chart (2021)	Position
Global 200 (Billboard)	110
Portugal (AFP)	159

== Certifications and sales ==
Region	Certification	Certified units/sales
Australia (ARIA)	2× Platinum	140,000^{‡}
Austria (IFPI Austria)	Platinum	30,000^{‡}
Belgium (BRMA)	Gold	20,000^{‡}
Canada (Music Canada)	8× Platinum	640,000^{‡}
Denmark (IFPI Danmark)	Platinum	90,000^{‡}
France (SNEP)	Diamond	333,333^{‡}
Germany (BVMI)	Gold	200,000^{‡}
Italy (FIMI)	Platinum	70,000^{‡}
Mexico (AMPROFON)	Platinum	60,000^{‡}
New Zealand (RMNZ)	Gold	15,000^{‡}
Nigeria (RCN)	Gold	2,500
Poland (ZPAV)	2× Platinum	40,000^{‡}
Portugal (AFP)	2× Platinum	20,000^{‡}
Spain (Promusicae)	Platinum	60,000^{‡}
Switzerland (IFPI Switzerland)	Platinum	20,000^{‡}
United Kingdom (BPI)	2× Platinum	1,200,000^{‡}
United States (RIAA)	15× Platinum	15,000,000^{‡}
Streaming
Greece (IFPI Greece)	Platinum	2,000,000^{†}
Sweden (GLF)	Platinum	8,000,000^{†}
^{‡} Sales+streaming figures based on certification alone.^{†} Streaming-only figures based on certification alone.

== Release history ==
Region	Date	Format	Label	Ref.
Various	January 10, 2020	Digital download; streaming	Epic; Freebandz	
United States	January 14, 2020	Urban adult contemporary radio	Epic; Freebandz	
United States	February 25, 2020	Contemporary hit radio	Epic; Freebandz	
