= Cash Out =

American rapper and convicted rapist (born 1990)

Ca$h Out
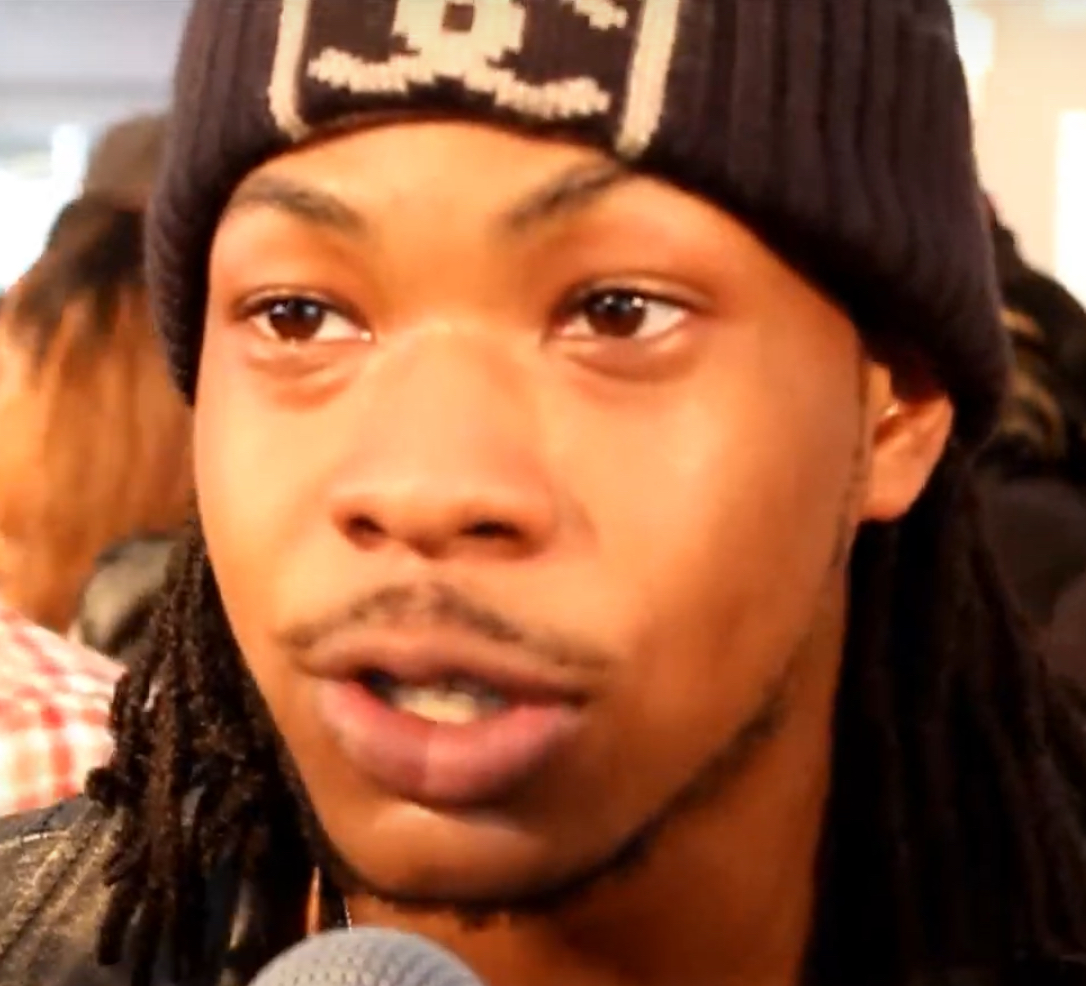
- Gibson in 2012

Background information
- Born: John-Michael Hakeem Gibson; August 15, 1990 (age 36); Columbus, Georgia, U.S.
- Origin: Atlanta, Georgia, U.S.
- Genre: Hip-hop
- Occupations: Rapper; songwriter
- Years active: 2010–2025
- Labels: Bases Loaded; PMG; E1; Epic
- Criminal information
- Status: Imprisoned
- Convictions: Racketeering; rape; sex trafficking; aggravated sodomy; pimping; pandering; leading a prostitution enterprise; battery; criminal possession of a weapon
- Criminal charges: Racketeering; rape; sex trafficking; aggravated sodomy; aggravated assault; pimping; pandering; leading a prostitution enterprise; battery; criminal possession of a weapon
- Penalty: Life imprisonment, plus 70 years

John-Michael Hakeem Gibson (born August 15, 1990), better known by his stage name Cash Out (stylized Ca$h Out), is an American former rapper and convicted sex offender. He signed with Epic Records to release his 2011 single "Cashin' Out", which peaked at number 36 on the Billboard Hot 100 and received platinum certification by the Recording Industry Association of America (RIAA). After parting ways with the label, his 2014 single "She Twerkin" narrowly entered the chart and served as the lead single for his debut album Let's Get It (2014), which in turn moderately entered the Billboard 200.

On July 28, 2025, after a 2022 arrest on racketeering and sex trafficking charges, he was found guilty and was sentenced to life imprisonment without the possibility of parole plus an additional 70 years after being convicted of an additional crime of rape, forcible sodomy and weapons possession.

== Career ==
In 2009, Gibson was acquitted of a gun charge in Clayton County, Georgia; he felt he had been given a second chance in life, so he turned his attentions towards advancing his career as a rapper. He initially signed to the independent record label Bases Loaded and released the single "Cashin' Out", which later appeared on his debut mixtape, titled It's My Time. After Epic Records label head L.A. Reid heard "Cashin' Out", he requested a meeting with Gibson to ask him to sign to the label. Gibson performed a song titled "Smilin' In My Face" during the interview, which convinced Reid to sign him to Epic.

Following its re-release through Epic Records in March 2012, "Cashin' Out" achieved significant commercial success in the United States, peaking at number 36 on the US Billboard Hot 100, also reaching the runner-up spot on the Hot R&B/Hip-Hop Songs chart and topping the Hot Rap Songs chart. The song's success has inspired many freestyles and remixes by other rappers, including Ludacris, Krayzie Bone Da Brat, Bow Wow, Roscoe Dash, Young Jeezy, Akon, Chief Keef, Fabolous and Yo Gotti, the latter four of whom appear on the song's official remix. A follow-up single, "Big Booty", was released to digital retailers on July 31, 2012. In May 2013, his new single "Another Country" was released with Future on the track.

=== 2014-2019: Signing with eOne Music & Let's Get It ===
In 2014, Gibson signed a deal with E1 Music and released the single "She Twerkin" in February 2014. The song debuted on the Hot 100 at number 100, making it his second chart entry. Gibson's debut album Let's Get It (formerly titled Patience) was released on August 26, 2014.

== Legal issues ==
In June 2023, Fulton County District Attorney Fani Willis filed charges against Gibson, along with five other individuals, in a 41-count indictment. The charges included allegations of rape, aggravated sodomy, human trafficking, and holding victims at gunpoint. Prosecutors claimed Gibson used his celebrity status and social media presence to entice women. The crimes allegedly took place in a hotel room near Fulton Industrial Boulevard and a residence in Carroll Heights, Atlanta. Prosecutors also alleged Gibson, Gibson's mother Linda Smith (who was also known as "Mama Ca$h"), and Gibson's cousin Tyrone Taylor would use their record label, Pyrex Music Group LLC, as a front for sex trafficking and racketeering activities.

Gibson's mugshot

On July 18, 2025, a jury convicted Gibson, Smith, and Taylor of various charges related to the 2023 indictment. Before sentencing, Gibson stated he thought the jurors "made the wrong judgment" and asserted his innocence, claiming the women were all of age and had given consent to their treatment, suggesting some witnesses who testified against him were "bullied into" cooperating with authorities, and comparing himself to Jesus Christ. On July 21, 2025, Gibson was sentenced to life imprisonment for rape, as well as an additional 70 years in prison for racketeering, sex trafficking, firearm possession, and related offenses, with some of those sentences to be served consecutively and some to be served concurrently. Taylor was sentenced to life imprisonment for aggravated sodomy and rape, with an additional 60 years for sex trafficking, assault, false imprisonment, and drug possession; Smith was sentenced to 20 years in prison for racketeering and 10 years, served concurrently, for sex trafficking. Gibson, Smith, and Taylor will all be placed on a sex offender registry and forbidden permanently from contacting any victims or revisiting any areas related to the crimes, such as Fulton Industrial Boulevard.

== Discography ==
=== Studio albums ===
List of studio albums, with selected information
Title	Album details	Peak chart positions		
Title	Album details	US	US R&B/HH	US Rap
Let's Get It	Released: August 26, 2014 (US); Label: Bases Loaded, eOne; Formats: CD, Digital download	43	8	4

=== Mixtapes ===
List of mixtapes, with release
Title	Album details
It's My Time	Released: March 14, 2012; Label: Bases Loaded; Format: Digital download
Keisha	Released: December 18, 2012; Label: Bases Loaded; Format: Digital download
Ya Feel Me?	Released: September 25, 2013; Label: Bases Loaded; Format: Digital download
Kitchens & Choppas	Released: November 7, 2014; Label: Bases Loaded, eOne; Format: Digital download
Kitchens & Choppas 2	Released: August 3, 2015; Label: Bases Loaded; Format: Digital download
Different	Released: March 24, 2017; Label: Basses Loaded; Format: Digital download

=== Singles ===
List of singles, with selected chart positions and certifications, showing year released and album name
Title	Year	Peak chart positions			Certifications	Album
Title	Year	US	US R&B	US Rap	Certifications	Album
"Cashin' Out"	2012	36	2	1	RIAA: Platinum	It's My Time
"Big Booty"	2012	113	70	—		Non-album singles
"Hold Up" (featuring Wale)	2012	—	50	—		Non-album singles
"Another Country" (featuring Future)	2013	—	—	—		Non-album singles
"She Twerkin"	2014	98	28	17	RIAA: Gold	Let's Get It
"Mexico"	2014	—	—	—		Let's Get It
"She Wanna Ride" (featuring Shanell)	2014	—	—	—		Let's Get It
"Sexually" (featuring PartyNextDoor)	2016	—	—	—		Kitchens & Choppas 3
"Top Shotta"	2017	—	—	—		Different
"—" denotes a recording that did not chart.

=== Guest appearances ===
List of non-single guest appearances, with other performing artists, showing year released and album name
Title	Year	Other artist(s)	Album
"Sprint"	2012	Jody Breeze	Airplane Mode
"New Money"	2012	Shawty Lo	Million Dollar Man
"So Terrific"	2012	Chill Will	Real Shit
"Snapbacks & Tattoos" (Remix)	2012	Driicky Graham, French Montana, Roscoe Dash	—N/a
"I Like Dat"	2012	Fresco Kane, King L	—N/a
"Dollar Signs"	2013	Young Scooter	Street Lottery
"Streets Ain't The Same"	2013	Young Scooter	Street Lottery
"Why You Mad"	2013	Uncle Murda	The First 48
"Don't Look Like That"	2013	Rich Homie Quan	Where Were You
"Streetz Dry"	2013	Trouble, Yung Ralph	The Return of December 17th
"All She Want"	2013	Lil Durk	—N/a
"Lil Niggaz"	2014	Lil Durk, Migos	Signed To The Streets 2
"$kinny"	2014	Quavo, Lil Durk	Bando
"Don't Worry"	2014	PartyNextDoor	PNDCOLOURS
"OVA"	2015	Waka Flocka Flame, Offset	The Turn Up Godz Tour & Salute Me or Shoot Me 5
"Dope Boy"	2015	DJ SpinKing, Fetty Wap	The Connect
"Like El Chapo"	2015	Kap G	El Southside

=== Music videos ===
List of music videos, with directors, showing year released
Title	Year	Director(s)
"Cashin' Out"	2012	Gabriel Hart
"Hold Up" (featuring Wale)	2012	Motion Family
"The Curb" (featuring Gucci Mane)	2012	Mr. Boomtown
"Keisha"	2013	Mr. Boomtown
"Can I Be The One"	2013	Mr. Boomtown
"Exclusive" (featuring B.o.B)	2013	Mr. Boomtown
