= No Label 2 =

Mixtape by Migos
- Released: February 25, 2014
- Recorded: 2013–14
- Genres: Hardcore hip hop; trap
- Length: 1:35:59
- Labels: Quality Control; Atlantic Records
- Producers: Zaytoven; Metro Boomin; TM88; Honorable C.N.O.T.E.; DJ Plugg; Murda Beatz; Phenom Da Don; Mack Boy; Stack Boy Twan; Cheese; Breezey Muzik; Cassius

Migos chronology
Y.R.N. (Young Rich Niggas) (2013)	No Label 2 (2014)	Rich Nigga Timeline (2014)

Singles from No Label 2
- 1. "Fight Night" Released: April 8, 2014; 2. "Handsome and Wealthy" Released: September 23, 2014

No Label 2 is the fourth mixtape by American hip hop group Migos, released on February 25, 2014. It features production by Zaytoven, Metro Boomin, TM88 and Da Honorable CNOTE, among others, and guest appearances by Meek Mill, Rich Homie Quan, Machine Gun Kelly, Young Thug and Jermaine Dupri. The tape, which was preceded by the promotional single "Ounces", is a sequel to their 2012 No Label. "Fight Night" peaked at number 69 on the US Billboard Hot 100 chart, becoming the group's most successful single at the time.

== Reception ==
Upon its release, No Label 2 was met with generally positive reviews from music critics. Consequence of Sound described it as "the perfect mix of raucous party tunes and triumphant rap anthems for your next BBQ or block party" and Exclaim! commented that it "is packed with potential hits." Vibe also praised the production on the tape, calling it "extensive and impressive". Complex named it the twenty-first best album of the first half of 2014.

In June 2014, No Label 2 was remastered with six songs less. This version has a different cover and another single on the track listing, "New Atlanta" featuring Rich Homie Quan, Young Thug, and Jermaine Dupri.

== Track listing ==
No.	Title	Producer(s)	Length
1.	"Intro No Label 2"	Goose	4:10
2.	"Copy Me"	Murda Beatz	4:40
3.	"Contraband"	Zaytoven	3:13
4.	"Add It Up"	Metro Boomin; Zaytoven	4:07
5.	"Peek a Boo"	Metro Boomin; Zaytoven	4:23
6.	"Antidote"	Murda Beatz	3:42
7.	"Migo Dreams" (featuring Meek Mill)	Zaytoven	2:45
8.	"Kidding Me"	Mack Boy	3:31
9.	"M&M's"	Phenom da Don	3:49
10.	"Fight Night"	Stackboy Twan	3:35
11.	"Handsome and Wealthy"	Cheeze Beatz	3:31
12.	"Birds"	Stackboy Twan	4:39
13.	"YRH" (featuring Rich Homie Quan)	Metro Boomin; TM88	3:34
14.	"No Fuckin With"	DJ Plugg	3:51
15.	"Freak No More"	Honorable C.N.O.T.E.	3:28
16.	"Hot Boy"	Breezy	3:53
17.	"Body Parts" (featuring Machine Gun Kelly)	Murda Beatz	3:44
18.	"Ounces"	Metro Boomin; Zaytoven	4:18
19.	"Emmitt Smith"	Murda Beatz	4:39
20.	"Built Like Me"	Zaytoven	2:54
21.	"First 48"	Mack Boy	3:18
22.	"Payola"	Cheeze Beatz	3:02
23.	"Where Were You"	Phenom da Don	4:23
24.	"Just Wait on It"	Zaytoven	4:22
25.	"Young Rich Niggas"	Cassius Jay	4:29
Total length:			1:35:47

Remastered Version - Streaming Version
No.	Title	Producer(s)	Length
1.	"Intro No Label 2"	Goose	4:10
2.	"Copy Me"	Murda Beatz	4:40
3.	"Contraband"	Zaytoven	3:13
4.	"Add It Up"	Metro Boomin; Zaytoven	4:07
5.	"Peek a Boo"	Metro Boomin; Zaytoven	4:23
6.	"Antidote"	Murda Beatz	3:42
7.	"Kidding Me"	Mack Boy	3:31
8.	"M&M's"	Phenom da Don	3:49
9.	"Fight Night"	Stackboy Twan	3:35
10.	"Handsome and Wealthy"	Cheeze Beatz	3:31
11.	"Birds"	Stackboy Twan	4:39
12.	"YRH" (featuring Rich Homie Quan)	Metro Boomin; TM88	3:34
13.	"No Fuckin With"	DJ Plugg	3:51
14.	"Freak No More"	Honorable C.N.O.T.E.	3:28
15.	"Hot Boy"	Breezy	3:53
16.	"Built Like Me"	Zaytoven	2:54
17.	"First 48"	Mack Boy	3:18
18.	"Payola"	Cheeze Beatz	3:02
19.	"Where Were You"	Phenom da Don	4:23
20.	"New Atlanta" (featuring Rich Homie Quan, Young Thug and Jermaine Dupri)	Murda Beatz	4:40
Total length:			1:16:47
