= Trillionaire (Future song) =

2020 single by Future featuring YoungBoy Never Broke Again

Single by Future featuring YoungBoy Never Broke Again

from the album High Off Life
- Released: May 26, 2020
- Genre: Trap
- Length: 2:47
- Label: Freebandz; Epic
- Songwriters: Nayvadius Wilburn; Kentrell Gaulden; Aaron Wright
- Producer: Teezyi

Future singles chronology
| "Tycoon" (2020) | "Trillionaire" (2020) | "Patek" / "Over Your Head" (2020) |

YoungBoy Never Broke Again singles chronology
| "Need It" (2020) | "Trillionaire" (2020) | "One Shot" (2020) |

"Trillionaire" is a song by American rapper Future featuring fellow American rapper YoungBoy Never Broke Again. It was sent to rhythmic contemporary radio on May 26, 2020, as the fifth single from the former's eighth studio album High Off Life (2020).

== Composition ==
Future and NBA YoungBoy sing about their perseverance in rags to riches as well as the hardships they faced on the way. Future also reflects on his sister, Tia Wilburn, highlighting her struggle with sickle cell disease, expressing his concern and affection for her through the lyrics:

Wish I had a cure on sickle cell, hate to see my sister suffer (Got you)

== Charts ==
| Chart (2020) | Peak position |
|---|---|
| Canada Hot 100 (Billboard) | 69 |
| UK Singles (OCC) | 85 |
| US Billboard Hot 100 | 34 |
| US Hot R&B/Hip-Hop Songs (Billboard) | 16 |
| US Rhythmic (Billboard) | 27 |

== Certifications ==
| Region | Certification | Certified units/sales |
|---|---|---|
| United States (RIAA) | Platinum | 1,000,000^{‡} |
^{‡} Sales+streaming figures based on certification alone.
