= Need It (Migos song) =

2020 single by Migos featuring YoungBoy Never Broke Again

Single by Migos featuring YoungBoy Never Broke Again

from the album Culture III
- Released: May 22, 2020
- Genre: Hip-hop
- Length: 3:15
- Label: Quality Control; Motown
- Songwriters: Curtis Jackson; Tony Cottrell; Quavious Marshall; Kiari Cephus; Kirshnik Khari Ball; Tyron Douglas; Kentrell Gaulden
- Producer: Buddah Bless

Migos singles chronology
"Racks 2 Skinny" (2020)	"Need It" (2020)	"Straightenin" (2021)

YoungBoy Never Broke Again singles chronology
"Make No Sense" (2020)	"Need It" (2020)	"Trillionaire" (2020)

Music video
- "Need It" on YouTube

"Need It" is a song by the American hip-hop trio Migos featuring the American rapper YoungBoy Never Broke Again. It was released as a single on May 22, 2020, through Quality Control Music and Motown Records. Produced by Buddah Bless, the song is built on a sped-up sample of "Get in My Car" from 50 Cent's 2005 album The Massacre, and both 50 Cent and the track's original producer, Hi-Tek, received songwriting credits. Although Migos members Quavo and Offset had each worked with YoungBoy individually, "Need It" marked the first collaboration between the Louisiana rapper and the Atlanta trio as a group.

The song was released hours after Quavo announced that he had graduated from high school as a member of Berkmar High School's class of 2020, and it followed the group's singles "Taco Tuesday" and "Racks 2 Skinny" as their third release of the month. The song received positive reviews from critics, with several publications naming it among the strongest Migos releases in years; Complex included it in its best new music of the week, HipHopDX listed it among the best hip-hop songs of May 2020, and HotNewHipHop ranked it eleventh on its list of the forty hottest hip-hop songs of 2020.

A music video directed by Wyatt Winfrey and Migos was released on August 20, 2020, paying homage to the 1996 comedy film Don't Be a Menace to South Central While Drinking Your Juice in the Hood, with Offset portraying Marlon Wayans's character Loc Dog and Saweetie making a cameo appearance. "Need It" peaked at number 62 on the Billboard Hot 100 and number 27 on the Hot R&B/Hip-Hop Songs chart, and was certified double platinum by the Recording Industry Association of America (RIAA) in 2022.

== Background and release ==
Following the release of Culture II in January 2018, each member of Migos released a solo album, and the group's output slowed considerably compared to the period surrounding their two Culture albums. By early 2020, the trio had begun ramping up activity in anticipation of a third part in the Culture series, releasing the Young Thug and Travis Scott collaboration "Give No Fxk" in February, followed in May by "Taco Tuesday" and "Racks 2 Skinny". In April 2020, Quavo announced that the group was also preparing a Quarantine Mixtape to precede the album, writing on Twitter: "Quarantine Mixtape?? Jus To Keep Y'all Straight. Then Culture 3. When All This Is Over!" Offset later suggested the album might not carry the Culture name at all, telling GQ: "Ever since 'Bad and Boujee' went No. 1 and then we dropped Culture and Culture II, I've heard the word culture so much ... I've been thinking of a plan to make something as powerful or more powerful [than Culture]."

A collaboration between Migos and YoungBoy Never Broke Again had been anticipated since the beginning of 2020, when YoungBoy posted footage to Twitter of himself and Offset trading verses in a recording session. On May 21, 2020, hours before the song's release, the group's Twitter account responded to a fan asking about the collaboration with a series of eye emojis. That evening, Quavo announced on Instagram that he had graduated from high school as a member of the class of 2020 at Berkmar High School in Lilburn, Georgia, adding, "And To Celebrate We Gonna Drop SMASH TONIGHT." Quavo had been the school's starting quarterback during his senior year in 2009 but dropped out months before graduating. "Need It" was released the following day, May 22, 2020, as a single through Quality Control Music and Motown Records under exclusive license to UMG Recordings.

== Composition ==
"Need It" runs for three minutes and fifteen seconds. Producer Buddah Bless constructed the beat by speeding up the instrumental of 50 Cent's "Get in My Car", a Hi-Tek-produced album cut from The Massacre (2005); both 50 Cent and Hi-Tek are credited as songwriters. Danny Adams of Lyrical Lemonade described the production as opening with "a high-pitched, sharp synth" met by "crisp percussion as well as a mixture of pounding 808s and more succinct, punchy drums". HipHopDX characterized the result as "ryder music" on which the four rappers' "diamond-encrusted lyrical flexes hit just as hard as the track's thumping bass guitar".

The song is structured around pairs of rappers trading bars. YoungBoy and Offset share the chorus and first verse, exchanging lines in what Wren Graves of Consequence called "a lyrical tennis match": YoungBoy sneers "I said I need it!" and Offset answers with "This Draco undefeated!" Quavo and Takeoff handle the second verse in the same tag-team fashion. Adams noted that the pairs mimic each other's flows and cadences while their vocal timbres contrast, "keeping the cadence consistent while the actual sonic differences in the sounds of their voices switch up", and likened the rapid, clipped delivery to "a burst of bullets firing out of a gun before needing to reload". Graves observed that the pairings ensure "every part of the song benefits from a high-energy tenor and a smooth-talking baritone". Lyrically, the song concerns the pursuit of money—in Graves's words, "not about merely wanting cash, it's about doing anything and everything to get it"—alongside boasts about guns, wealth, and the group's influence on a younger generation of rappers, whom they accuse of stealing their flow and fashion. In the second verse, Takeoff and Quavo rap: "I'm thinkin' they forgot the way we paved / We been givin' too many niggas these passes ... They stole the flow, now they tryna run off with the fashion."

== Critical reception ==
"Need It" received positive reviews from music critics. Chris DeVille of Stereogum wrote that Migos sounded "rejuvenated" on the single after a period of "Migos fatigue" around the Culture albums, praising the "flurry of punchlines" the four rappers unleash over Buddah Bless's "bouncing beat" and concluding that the song "sounds great on the precipice of this weekend". Graves of Consequence called the trading-bars formula "tried-and-true" and "easy on the ear". Wongo Okon of Uproxx considered it "one of their stronger drops over the past years", noting that the trio shed much of the heavy autotune of their recent releases. Jessica McKinney of Complex selected the song for the magazine's best new music of the week, describing it as "an aggressive track" on which "the collective rips through razor-sharp verses that allude to their intoxicating and violent lifestyles". Adams of Lyrical Lemonade praised the group's continually inventive cadences, writing that the flow-swapping "keeps listeners on their toes at all times".

The song appeared on several year-end and retrospective lists. HipHopDX named it one of the best hip-hop songs of May 2020. HotNewHipHop ranked it eleventh on its list of the forty hottest hip-hop songs of 2020, writing that the track "revives the sound for a new generation" and that "the personalities and vibes of both entities mesh well on this party track". In 2022, XXL included YoungBoy's contribution on its list of his best guest verses, calling the song a "slept-on smash" and highlighting his back-and-forth with Offset.

== Music video ==
Migos teased the music video for weeks before its release. In early August 2020, the group shared a trailer on Instagram announcing the video would premiere at noon that Thursday, previewing "fast cars, flashy chains, and a hot tub filled with women". After a delay, the group posted movie-poster-inspired artwork depicting the four rappers in white tank tops in a back alley, confirming a new release date. The video, co-directed by Wyatt Winfrey and Migos and billed as a Quality Control production, was released on August 20, 2020, the same day YoungBoy announced that his album Top would be released on September 11.

Inspired by the 1996 comedy Don't Be a Menace to South Central While Drinking Your Juice in the Hood. Offset portrays Loc Dog, the drug-dealer character played by Marlon Wayans in the film, complete with a condom and pacifier in his hair, and delivers what HipHopDX called "a near-perfect reenactment" of the scene in which Loc Dog unveils a missile in the back of his mail truck. Offset rides in a lowrider with YoungBoy, while Takeoff and Quavo appear at a pool party; Quavo, wearing yellow overalls, rides a 2020 Can-Am Ryker with a red-haired Saweetie—his girlfriend at the time—on the back. The clip also features Hummer trucks and Jeeps among what Billboard described as "a number of sleek rides". Alex Zidel of HotNewHipHop quipped that the four rappers, draped in matching outfits for much of the video, "look like they're about to form a whole new boy band", and singled out Offset as "the true star" and "a natural actor". Carolyn Droke of Uproxx called the visual "energetic", writing that "each scene is more energetic than the last".

== Commercial performance ==
"Need It" debuted on the Billboard Hot 100 dated June 6, 2020, and peaked at number 62, spending fifteen weeks on the chart. It reached number 27 on the Hot R&B/Hip-Hop Songs chart on September 5, 2020, remaining on that listing for nineteen weeks, and peaked at number 13 on the Rhythmic Airplay chart. The song also reached number 75 on the Rolling Stone Top 100. In the United Kingdom, it charted for one week at number 57 on the Official Charts Company's Official Video Streaming Chart dated September 3, 2020.

On November 30, 2022, the RIAA certified "Need It" gold, platinum, and double platinum simultaneously, denoting two million certified units in the United States. The single was certified gold in Brazil by Pro-Música Brasil and platinum in New Zealand by Recorded Music NZ in November 2023, following a gold certification there in April 2022.

== Credits and personnel ==
Credits are adapted from Apple Music.

- Quavo – vocals, songwriting
- Offset – vocals, songwriting
- Takeoff – vocals, songwriting
- YoungBoy Never Broke Again – vocals, songwriting
- Buddah Bless (Ty-Ron Douglas) – production, programming, songwriting
- Hi-Tek (Tony Cottrell) – songwriting
- 50 Cent (Curtis James Jackson) – songwriting
- Leslie Brathwaite – mixing
- DJ Durel – recording
- Colin Leonard – mastering

== Charts ==
Chart performance for "Need It"
Chart (2020)	Peak position
UK Video Streaming (OCC)	57
US Billboard Hot 100	62
US Hot R&B/Hip-Hop Songs (Billboard)	27
US Rhythmic Airplay (Billboard)	13
US Rolling Stone Top 100	75

== Certifications ==
Certifications for "Need It"
Region	Certification	Certified units/sales
Brazil (Pro-Música Brasil)	Gold	20,000^{‡}
New Zealand (RMNZ)	Platinum	30,000^{‡}
United States (RIAA)	2× Platinum	2,000,000^{‡}
^{*} Sales figures based on certification alone.^{^} Shipments figures based on certification alone.^{‡} Sales+streaming figures based on certification alone.

== Release history ==
Release history for "Need It"
Region	Date	Format	Label	Ref.
Various	May 22, 2020	Digital download; streaming	Quality Control Music; Motown	

== Sources ==
- "Need It (feat. YoungBoy Never Broke Again) – Single by Migos". Apple Music. May 22, 2020. Archived from the original on October 6, 2025.
- Bloom, Madison (May 22, 2020). "Listen to Migos' New Song "Need It" With NBA YoungBoy". Pitchfork. Archived from the original on April 26, 2025.
- Moore, Sam (May 22, 2020). "Listen to Migos' new YoungBoy Never Broke Again collaboration 'Need It'". NME. Archived from the original on August 9, 2022.
- DeVille, Chris (May 22, 2020). "Migos – "Need It" (Feat. YoungBoy Never Broke Again)". Stereogum. Archived from the original on November 16, 2022.
- Fu, Eddie (May 22, 2020). "Migos & Youngboy Never Broke Again's "Need It" Samples A 50 Cent Deep Cut". Genius. Archived from the original on October 9, 2021.
- Graves, Wren (May 22, 2020). "Migos Team with YoungBoy Never Broke Again on "Need It": Stream". Consequence. Archived from the original on September 15, 2023.
- Okon, Wongo (May 22, 2020). "Migos And Youngboy Never Broke Again 'Need It' On Their Latest Single". Uproxx. Archived from the original on May 24, 2024.
- Droke, Carolyn (August 20, 2020). "Migos Get Hyped In Their 'Need It' Video With NBA Youngboy". Uproxx. Archived from the original on August 15, 2025.
- Caraan, Sophie (May 22, 2020). "Migos and YoungBoy Never Broke Again "Need It" on New Single". Hypebeast. Archived from the original on April 27, 2025.
- Estiler, Keith (August 20, 2020). "Migos and YoungBoy Never Broke Again Drop "Need It" Video". Hypebeast. Archived from the original on May 13, 2025.
- Hore-Thorburn, Isabelle (May 22, 2020). "Migos Celebrate Quavo's Graduation With New Song "Need It" Ft. NBA YoungBoy". Highsnobiety. Archived from the original on November 28, 2025.
- Aniftos, Rania (August 20, 2020). "Migos & YoungBoy Never Broke Again Are Riding in Style for 'Need It' Video". Billboard. Archived from the original on January 24, 2025.
- "Migos and YoungBoy Never Broke Again Drop 'Need It' Video". Rap-Up. August 20, 2020. Archived from the original on March 15, 2025.
- Powell, Jon (May 22, 2020). "Migos connect with YoungBoy Never Broke Again for "Need It"". Revolt. Archived from the original on March 15, 2025.
- High, Kemet (August 3, 2022). "YoungBoy Never Broke Again's Best Guest Verses". XXL. Archived from the original on August 9, 2025.
- Espinoza, Joshua (May 22, 2020). "Migos Connects With YoungBoy Never Broke Again on "Need It"". Complex. Archived from the original on December 3, 2024.
- Price, Joe (August 20, 2020). "Migos Share "Need It" Video f/ YoungBoy Never Broke Again". Complex. Archived from the original on February 23, 2025.
- McKinney, Jessica (May 22, 2020). "Best New Music This Week: Gunna, Migos, Young M.A, and More". Complex. Archived from the original on June 20, 2024.
- "Need It by Migos ft YoungBoy Never Broke". Official Charts Company. Archived from the original on July 7, 2026.
- A., Aron (August 2020). "Migos Share Trailer For "Need It" Music Video With NBA Youngboy". HotNewHipHop. Archived from the original on November 28, 2025.
- Findlay, Mitch (August 2020). "Migos & YoungBoy Never Broke Again Set A Date For "Need It" Video". HotNewHipHop. Archived from the original on November 28, 2025.
- Zidel, Alex (August 20, 2020). "Migos & NBA Youngboy Look Like They're Forming A New Boy Band In "Need It"". HotNewHipHop. Archived from the original on November 28, 2025.
- HNHH Staff (December 2020). "Top 40 Hottest Hip-Hop Songs Of 2020". HotNewHipHop. Archived from the original on November 28, 2025.
- Adams, Danny (May 22, 2020). "Need It – [Migos] ft. [YoungBoy Never Broke Again]". Lyrical Lemonade. Archived from the original on December 4, 2023.
- Ivey, Justin (August 21, 2020). "Migos & YoungBoy Never Broke Again's 'Need It' Video Spoofs A Hood Comedy Classic". HipHopDX. Archived from the original on August 23, 2020.
- DX Staff (June 1, 2020). "Best Hip Hop Songs Of May 2020". HipHopDX. Archived from the original on November 28, 2025.
- "Gold & Platinum: Need It". Recording Industry Association of America. November 30, 2022.
- "Migos Chart History (Hot 100)". Billboard. Archived from the original on September 13, 2025.
- "Top 100 Songs, August 21, 2020". Rolling Stone. August 21, 2020. Archived from the original on May 26, 2021.
- "Certificados – Migos". Pro-Música Brasil (in Portuguese).
- "Single Certifications". Radioscope. Recorded Music NZ.
