= Bernie Lawrence-Watkins =

Entertainment attorney

Bernie Lawrence-Watkins is an entertainment attorney and the principal of B. Lawrence Watkins & Associates, PC, a law practice focused on entertainment, intellectual property and business law. Her clients have included recording artists and music producers such as Latto, 21 Savage, Young Nudy, Tay Keith and Doe Boy.

== Early life and education ==
Lawrence-Watkins was raised in East Elmhurst, Queens, and attended Fiorello H. LaGuardia High School. While attending Howard University, she saw her brother struggle after signing a recording agreement, an experience she later cited as influencing her decision to enter entertainment law.

== Career ==
Billboard reported in 2023 that Lawrence-Watkins began representing Latto when the rapper was 17.

In its 2024 Top Music Lawyers coverage, Billboard listed Lawrence-Watkins as founder and CEO of B. Lawrence Watkins & Associates and reported that the firm's roster included Latto, Young Nudy, Tay Keith and Doe Boy. The publication reported that the firm worked on endorsement agreements for Latto involving HALLS and Sprite, helped structure Young Nudy's renegotiation with RCA Records, and handled rights clearances for Apple's use of Doe Boy's name, image and likeness in an iPhone 15 advertisement.

Lawrence-Watkins has also been quoted in reporting about music-industry economics and entertainment law. In a 2019 YES! Magazine article, she discussed touring income, streaming royalties and entertainment-industry legal disputes.

In 2019, Rolling Out reported that Lawrence-Watkins was among Atlanta attorneys and judges honored at the publication's Justice for All gala.
