= Fight Night (song) =

Single by Migos

from the album No Label 2
- Released: April 8, 2014
- Recorded: 2013
- Genre: Hardcore hip-hop
- Length: 3:35
- Label: Quality Control; 300
- Songwriters: Quavious Marshall; Kirsnick Ball; Kiari Cephus; Patrick Thomas "PJ"
- Producer: Stack Boy Twan

Migos singles chronology
"Hannah Montana" (2013)	"Fight Night" (2014)	"Looking for You" (2014)

Music video
- "Fight Night" on YouTube

"Fight Night" is a song by American hip hop group Migos. It was released on April 8, 2014, by Quality Control and 300 Entertainment as the first single from their mixtape No Label 2 (2014) and was produced by Stack Boy Twan. It peaked at number 69 on the US Billboard Hot 100 chart, making it the group's highest-charting single at the time. A remix was made by fellow American rapper Tyga.

== Critical reception ==
Brian Josephs of HotNewHipHop said that the song represents Migos' delivery of high-energy Atlanta rap, saying that "This isn't a throwaway track, but a confidently sold Bay Area Hyphy scene send-off."

Pitchfork ranked the song at number 56 on its list of the 100 Best Tracks of 2014. Pitchfork staff writer David Drake said "In its misunderstanding of a pre-existing template, it reached more directly for the pop jugular. Each line was quotable, delivered with the unapologetic confidence of a group willing to say whatever they can get away with. While perhaps not always the best bedroom strategy, 'Fight Night' does hit on the mania of lust more directly than anyone else." The song was featured in the 2017 Despicable Me 3 in the intro of the movie

== Commercial performance ==
The song peaked at number 69 on the US Billboard Hot 100 chart in September 2014, making it their highest-charting single; until "Bad and Boujee", featuring Lil Uzi Vert would reach number one on the chart in early 2017. It charted for 16 weeks total.

== Music video ==
The music video for "Fight Night" was released on June 9, 2014. Young Thug makes a cameo appearance in the video.

In the video, Giuseppe Verdi's Messa da Requiem: 7b. Libera me: Dies irae is sampled.

== Awards and nominations ==
Year	Ceremony	Award	Result
2014	2014 BET Hip Hop Awards	Best Club Banger	Won

== Charts ==
=== Weekly charts ===
Chart (2014)	Peak position
US Billboard Hot 100	69
US Hot R&B/Hip-Hop Songs (Billboard)	17
US Rhythmic Airplay (Billboard)	38

=== Year-end charts ===
Chart (2014)	Position
US Hot R&B/Hip-Hop Songs (Billboard)	59

== Certifications ==
Region	Certification	Certified units/sales
New Zealand (RMNZ)	Gold	15,000^{‡}
United States (RIAA)	Gold	500,000^{‡}
^{‡} Sales+streaming figures based on certification alone.
