= We Were Born for This =

Single by Justin Bieber
- Released: April 28, 2014
- Recorded: December 22, 2013
- Studio: Noble Street Studios (Toronto, Canada)
- Genre: Sentimental ballad; R&B; Latin ballad
- Length: 3:33
- Songwriter(s): Justin Bieber; Sam Hook
- Producer(s): Eric Hudson

Justin Bieber singles chronology
"Confident" (2013)	"We Were Born for This" (2014)	"Looking for You" (2014)

"We Were Born for This" is a song recorded by Canadian singer Justin Bieber. He shared the song through SoundCloud on April 28, 2014. Written by Bieber and Sam Hook, it was produced by Eric Hudson. It is a sentimental ballad song consisting of a twangy guitar solo, while Bieber uses a smooth vocal, sometimes reaching falsetto. Lyrically, "We Were Born for This" describes the problems of growing up in the public eye as a celebrity and ignoring the haters that usually come with such attention of fame.

== Background and release ==
Released during early 2014, the song came during a time where Bieber had been facing many misdemeanors, including his first arrest in Miami, Florida, earlier in January of that year. It followed a few months after the release of Bieber's compilation album Journals in December 2013. Shortly after Bieber had released the song, he posted a video link on his Twitter account to the "I Was Born for This, My City" conference (hosted by Carl Lentz, a pastor that Bieber had known for a while) that took place earlier that year, which the song is probably based on as well.

Bieber shared the track on his SoundCloud account on April 28, 2014, which he had linked to by announcing the release on his Twitter account.

== Composition ==
"We Were Born for This" was written by Justin Bieber and Sam Hook. It was produced by Eric Hudson. The song is a slow sentimental ballad format, with most of it using a twangy guitar solo, while Bieber uses breathy and gentle vocals that occasionally reach falsetto.

Lyrically, the song describes having to grow up in the face of the public as a celebrity and dealing with both the positive and the negative attention that can come with it, with Bieber crooning "And I won't waste it thinking about what you gotta say / Cause I'm here to stay" and "Look at all the people / Standing outside / So dedicated".

== Controversy ==
The cover art for "We Were Born for This" received criticism due to the similarity between it and the cover art for American rock band Paramore's 2007 album Riot!, which used a very similar design and font – it later transpired that the artwork had been made in 2011 on a Tumblr post. Hayley Williams, the lead vocalist and songwriter of Paramore, did not comment on the controversy, though she referred to it on Twitter.
