= High Off Life =

Studio album by Future
- Released: May 15, 2020
- Studios: Chalice (Los Angeles); Jungle City (New York City); Windmark (Santa Monica)
- Genre: Hip hop
- Length: 70:03
- Labels: Freebandz; Epic
- Producers: Ambezza; ATL Jacob; Brandon Finessin; Cubeatz; D. Hill; DJ Spinz; DY; LeftyDaProducer; Max Lord; Morgan O'Connor; Okami; Omar Guetfa; Outtatown; Oz; Riko Spazzin; Southside; Tay Keith; Teezyi; TM88; TrellGotWings; Too Dope; Vou; Wheezy; Will-A-Fool; Yung Icey

Future chronology
Save Me (2019)	High Off Life (2020)	Pluto × Baby Pluto (2020)

Singles from High Off Life
- 1. "Trillionaire" Released: May 26, 2020

High Off Life is the eighth studio album by American rapper Future, released on May 15, 2020, by Freebandz and Epic Records. The album was executive produced by close friend and frequent collaborator DJ Esco. It features guest appearances by Travis Scott, YoungBoy Never Broke Again, Young Thug, Lil Uzi Vert, Drake, Lil Durk, Meek Mill, Doe Boy, DaBaby, and Lil Baby.

High Off Life received generally favorable reviews from critics and debuted atop the US Billboard 200. It is Future's seventh album to top the chart. The album was preceded by the standalone singles "100 Shooters", "Last Name", "Life Is Good" and "Tycoon", with "Trillionaire" being released as the album's only official single. "Life Is Good" peaked at number two on the Billboard Hot 100.

== Background ==
During an interview with XXL, published on April 7, 2020, Future shared the album's title as Life Is Good. Alongside the announcement, he described the album by stating;

This album right here defines me at a creative level. Going to the next level where you just going to the next level and always going outside the box, but still remaining true to my core fans and my core audience. It's me trying new things. I want to remain true to self, but also true to my fans and just giving them a good project, a great project to be able to listen to, but also for different artists to be able to feed off of, create off of, come up with different ideas and just being at the forefront of just making a solid album, a solid, complete album. It's just very important to me.

On May 12, 2020, the album was retitled to High Off Life, as the previous title, Life Is Good, was considered unsuitable during the COVID-19 pandemic. American basketball player Lonzo Ball, a known fan of Future, posted an Instagram story of the album's tracklist, whereafter Epic Records officially announced the album's release on May 15, 2020.

== Promotion ==
=== Singles ===
"100 Shooters", featuring American rappers Meek Mill and Doe Boy, was released on July 12, 2019. The music video for the song was released on August 22, 2019.

"Last Name" featuring American rapper Lil Durk, was released on November 15, 2019. The music video for the song was released on November 20.

"Life Is Good" featuring Canadian rapper Drake, was released on January 10, 2020, as well an accompanying music video. The song peaked at number two on the US Billboard Hot 100.

The music video for "Tycoon", was released on March 27, 2020. It was released for digital download on April 1, 2020. The song peaked at number 76 on the Billboard Hot 100.

"Trillionaire" featuring American rapper YoungBoy Never Broke Again, was sent to rhythmic contemporary radio on May 26, 2020, as the album's only official single. The song peaked at number 34 on the Billboard Hot 100.

=== Promotional singles ===
The remix of "Life Is Good" featuring Drake and American rappers DaBaby and Lil Baby, was released on February 15, 2020, as the album's first promotional single.

== Critical reception ==
Professional ratings
Aggregate scores
Source	Rating
AnyDecentMusic?	6.3/10
Metacritic	70/100
Review scores
Source	Rating
AllMusic	3.5/5 stars
Beats Per Minute	60%
The Daily Telegraph	2/5 stars
Entertainment Weekly	B−
Exclaim!	7/10
HipHopDX	3.9/5
NME	3/5 stars
Pitchfork	7.1/10
Rolling Stone	3.5/5 stars

High Off Life was met with generally favorable reviews. At Metacritic, which assigns a normalized rating out of 100 to reviews from professional publications, the album received an average score of 70, based on nine reviews. Aggregator AnyDecentMusic? gave it 6.3 out of 10, based on their assessment of the critical consensus.

In a positive review, Dana Scott of HipHopDX wrote that "There are 21 tracks on jammed with booming, mellow Atlanta trap flare and some inconsistency between bangers and filler tracks with similar minimalist, psychedelic soundscapes". Jayasuriya Mehan from Pitchfork enjoyed the album, saying, "Except for the previously released singles that pad the end of the record in keeping with industry norms, High Off Life is better-paced and sequenced than most of Future's recent releases—the whole thing seems to glide by frictionlessly". Rob Sheffield of Rolling Stone gave the album a positive review, stating that "High Off Life is Future at his most optimistic, as the man from Pluto decides to send out a positive message. But it's still got the spaced-out melancholy that always fills his sound, as he clocks some serious demon hours in the late-night druggy strip-club haze of his soul". Addison Herron-Wheeler of Exclaim! said, "Pretty much the only complaint is that, similar to all of his releases since the infamous Evol, it delivers and lives up to the hype, but it doesn't build and surpass his previous work. It remains to be seen whether he will ever create an album that is better than everything he's done so far, but this is still an extremely solid release". Entertainment Weekly critic Gary Suarez said, "While the commercial prospects for High Off Life remain high, Future seems, at least creatively, in a state of arrested development here. ... Still, when High Off Life succeeds, it does so extraordinarily".

NME's Luke Morgan Britton wrote in a lukewarm review of High Off Life that "[the] trap outlier exerts flashes of greatness... but doesn't quite fulfil his sales pitch", adding: "Future described his last album, 2019's The Wizrd, as the closing of a chapter, meaning that High Off Life seemed primed to signal a fresh start. Despite its glimpses of greatness, though, this album revisits too many of the rapper's trademark themes to truly make good on his jubilant pre-release promises." In a mixed review, Beats Per Minute's Chase McMullen stated: "For the man who elevated devastated depravity into his own art form, it can't help but feel a bit disappointing to watch him continue to coast."

=== Industry awards ===
Awards and nominations for High Off Life
Year	Ceremony	Category	Result	Ref.
2020	BET Hip Hop Awards	Album of the Year	Nominated	

== Commercial performance ==
High Off Life was certified gold by the Recording Industry Association of America (RIAA) 30 minutes after its release due to a technicality that incorporates the track-equivalent units moved by previously released singles "Life Is Good" and "Tycoon".

The album debuted at number one on the US Billboard 200 chart, with 153,000 album-equivalent units (including 16,000 pure album sales) in its first week. This became Future's seventh album to debut at number one. The album also accumulated a total of 186.3 million on-demand streams of the set's 21 tracks in the week ending May 21. In its second week, the album dropped to number three on the chart, earning an additional 61,000 units. In its third week, the album dropped to number five on the chart, earning 40,000 more units. In its fourth week, the album climbed to number four on the chart, earning 39,000 units, bringing its four-week total to 293,000 album-equivalent units. On July 27, 2022, the album was certified double platinum for combined sales and album-equivalent units of over two million units in the United States.

In the United Kingdom, High Off Life debuted at number five on the UK Albums Chart, moving 4,000 units. It is Future's highest-charting album to date in the United Kingdom.

== Track listing ==
High Off Life track listing
No.	Title	Writer(s)	Producer(s)	Length
1.	"Trapped in the Sun"	Nayvadius Wilburn; Willie Byrd	Will-A-Fool	3:21
2.	"HiTek Tek"	Wilburn; Jacob Canady; Omar-Rayan Guetfa	ATL Jacob; Omar Guetfa	3:02
3.	"Touch the Sky"	Wilburn; Joshua Luellen; Max Lord	Southside; Lord	2:24
4.	"Solitaires" (featuring Travis Scott)	Wilburn; Jacques Webster II; Amir Esmailian; Wesley Glass	Wheezy	3:25
5.	"Ridin Strikers"	Wilburn; Luellen; Canady; Kevin Gomringer; Tim Gomringer; Ugur Tig	Southside; ATL Jacob; Cubeatz; Vou	3:45
6.	"One of My"	Wilburn; Canady	ATL Jacob	2:22
7.	"Posted with Demons"	Wilburn; Gary Hill; Jaterrian Hudson; Ishmael Hurst	DJ Spinz; TrellGotWings; Okami; Shades^{[a]}	3:09
8.	"Hard to Choose One"	Wilburn; Luellen; Tig	Southside; Vou	3:13
9.	"Trillionaire" (featuring YoungBoy Never Broke Again)	Wilburn; Kentrell Gaulden; Aaron Wright	Teezyi	2:47
10.	"Harlem Shake" (featuring Young Thug)	Wilburn; Jeffery Williams; Glass	Wheezy	2:28
11.	"Up the River"	Wilburn; Willie Byrd	Will-A-Fool	3:09
12.	"Pray for a Key"	Wilburn; Bryan Simmons; Lesidney Ragland; Isaiah Devoe	TM88; Too Dope; Yung Icey	2:53
13.	"Too Comfortable"	Wilburn; Luellen; Tig	Southside; Vou	3:56
14.	"All Bad" (featuring Lil Uzi Vert)	Wilburn; Symere Woods; Brandon Terrell; Tobias Dekker	Brandon Finessin; Outtatown	3:27
15.	"Outer Space Bih"	Wilburn; Dwan Avery; Cedric Jobe Jr.	DY; LeftyDaProducer	2:55
16.	"Accepting My Flaws"	Wilburn; Luellen; K. Gomringer; T. Gomringer	Southside; Cubeatz	4:19
17.	"Life Is Good" (featuring Drake)	Wilburn; Aubrey Graham; Darius Hill; Ozan Yildirim; Mathias Liyew	D. Hill; Oz; Ambezza	3:57
18.	"Last Name" (featuring Lil Durk)	Wilburn; Durk Banks; Avery; Morgan O'Connor	DY; O'Connor	3:28
19.	"Tycoon"	Wilburn; Avery; Glass; Adrian Hearne Jr.	DY; Wheezy; Riko Spazzin	3:21
20.	"100 Shooters" (featuring Meek Mill and Doe Boy)	Wilburn; Robert Williams; Cotrell Dennard; Brytavious Chambers; K. Gomringer; T. Gomringer	Tay Keith; Cubeatz	3:28
21.	"Life Is Good" (remix featuring Drake, DaBaby and Lil Baby)	Wilburn; Graham; Jonathan Kirk; Dominique Jones; Maudell Watkins; D. Hill; Yildirim; Liyew	D. Hill; Oz; Ambezza	5:14
Total length:				70:03

Notes

- ^{^[a]} signifies an uncredited co-producer

== Personnel ==
Credits adapted from the album's liner notes.

- Bryan Anzel – recording (tracks 1, 6–9, 12–14, 20, 21), mixing (track 21)
- Eric Manco – recording (tracks 3, 5, 8–11, 16–20), engineering (tracks 1, 4, 6, 7, 9, 13, 14)
- Mike Dean – recording (track 4)
- Fxxxy – recording (track 4)
- Seth Firkins – recording (track 5)
- Noel Cadastre – recording (track 17), mixing (track 17)
- Anthony Cruz – recording (track 20)
- Tyler Unland – engineering assistant (track 20)
- Manny Marroquin – mixing (tracks 1, 3, 4, 6, 13, 14, 19)
- Seal Solymar – mixing (track 4)
- Fabian Marasciullo – mixing (track 20)
- Colin Leonard – mastering (tracks 1–16, 19, 20)
- Chris Athens – mastering (tracks 17, 21)
- Glenn Schick – mastering (track 18)

== Charts ==
=== Weekly charts ===
Chart performance for High Off Life
Chart (2020)	Peak position
Australian Albums (ARIA)	15
Austrian Albums (Ö3 Austria)	10
Belgian Albums (Ultratop Flanders)	14
Belgian Albums (Ultratop Wallonia)	21
Canadian Albums (Billboard)	1
Danish Albums (Hitlisten)	14
Dutch Albums (Album Top 100)	7
Finnish Albums (Suomen virallinen lista)	43
French Albums (SNEP)	15
German Albums (Offizielle Top 100)	38
Irish Albums (Official Charts)	15
Italian Albums (FIMI)	15
Lithuanian Albums (AGATA)	7
New Zealand Albums (RMNZ)	21
Norwegian Albums (VG-lista)	18
Swedish Albums (Sverigetopplistan)	57
Swiss Albums (Schweizer Hitparade)	5
UK Albums (Official Charts)	5
US Billboard 200	1
US Top R&B/Hip-Hop Albums (Billboard)	1

=== Year-end charts ===
2020 year-end chart performance for High Off Life
Chart (2020)	Position
US Billboard 200	47
US Top R&B/Hip-Hop Albums (Billboard)	30

2021 year-end chart performance for High Off Life
Chart (2021)	Position
US Billboard 200	89
US Top R&B/Hip-Hop Albums (Billboard)	57

== Certifications ==
Certifications and sales for High Off Life
Region	Certification	Certified units/sales
Canada (Music Canada)	Platinum	80,000^{‡}
Poland (ZPAV)	Gold	10,000^{‡}
United States (RIAA)	2× Platinum	2,000,000^{‡}
^{‡} Sales+streaming figures based on certification alone.

== Release history ==
Release dates and formats for High Off Life
Region	Date	Label(s)	Format(s)	Ref.
Various	May 15, 2020	Freebandz; Epic	Digital download; streaming	
Various	August 21, 2020	Freebandz; Epic	CD; vinyl	

== See also ==
- List of Billboard 200 number-one albums of 2020
- List of Billboard number-one R&B/hip-hop albums of 2020
- List of number-one albums of 2020 (Canada)
