= Versace (song) =

Single by Migos

from the album Y.R.N. (Young Rich Niggas)
- Released: July 8, 2013
- Recorded: 2013
- Genre: Hip hop; trap
- Length: 3:25
- Label: Quality Control
- Songwriters: Quavious Marshall; Kirsnick Ball; Kiari Cephus; Xavier Dotson
- Producer: Zaytoven

Migos singles chronology
"Versace" (2013)	"Hannah Montana" (2013)

Music video
- "Versace" on YouTube

"Versace" is the debut single by American hip hop group Migos. It was released in July 2013, by Quality Control Music. The track, which was included on their mixtape Y.R.N. (Young Rich Niggas) (2013), was produced by Zaytoven. Following a remix by Canadian rapper Drake, the song became popular and peaked at number 99 on the US Billboard Hot 100 chart. Drake performed it at the 2013 iHeartRadio Music Festival. The song is ranked as one of the 100 songs that defined the 2010s decade by Billboard.

== Background ==
The beat of the song, produced by Zaytoven, was also given to rapper Soulja Boy, who used it for his song "OMG Part 2" two years earlier in 2011.

== Legacy and flow ==
Versace is highly notable for bringing mainstream attention to the triplet flow within hip hop. While not the first song to do so, it is considered to be responsible for bringing the particular style of rapping, later coined the 'Versace' flow, to the forefront of hip hop in the 2010s.

== Music video ==
The official music video, directed by Gabriel Hart, was released on September 30, 2013. It shows Migos and Zaytoven at a luxurious mansion, wearing Versace clothes and accessories. The video also features a snippet of Migos' second single "Hannah Montana". As of June 2025, it has gained over 41 million views on YouTube. Celebrities like Soulja Boy, Rich The Kid, Sean Kingston, Zaytoven, and Donatella Versace appear as cameos for the Music Video.

== Remixes ==
Pop singer Justin Bieber also posted a short video online of him rapping to the song. A remix followed by a music video was released by professional boxer Adrien Broner. American rapper Johnny Polygon, also recorded a remix, which he re-titled "Old Navy". Kap G has remixed "Versace" on his mixtape Migo Work. American rapper Tyga has remixed "Versace" on his mixtape Well Done 4. French rapper Swagg Man also made a remix to the song, as did Austrian rapper Why SL Know Plug, formerly known as Money Boy.

== Accolades ==
"Versace" was placed in multiple year-end lists of 2013. XXL named it one of the top five hip hop songs of 2013.

Year	Publication	Rank	Country	List
2013	XXL	3	United States	The 25 Best Songs of 2013
2013	Complex	4	United States	The 50 Best Songs of 2013
2013	SPIN	5	United States	50 Best Songs of 2013
2013	Pitchfork	38	United States	The Top 100 Tracks of 2013
2013	Rolling Stone	69	United States	The 100 Best Songs of 2013
2013	Billboard	99	United States	R&B/Hip-Hop Songs (Year end)

== Chart performance ==
Chart (2013)	Peak position
US Billboard Hot 100	99
US Hot R&B/Hip-Hop Songs (Billboard)	31

=== Year-end charts ===
Chart (2013)	Position
US Hot R&B/Hip-Hop Songs (Billboard)	99

== Certifications ==
Region	Certification	Certified units/sales
United States (RIAA)	Gold	500,000^{‡}
^{‡} Sales+streaming figures based on certification alone.

== Release history ==
Country	Date	Format	Label
United States	October 1, 2013	Digital download	Quality Control Music
