= Big Booty (Cash Out song) =

2012 single by Cash Out

Single by Cash Out
- Released: July 31, 2012
- Length: 2:55
- Label: Epic
- Songwriter(s): John-Michael Gibson; Lazar Gray; Markous Roberts
- Producer(s): FKi 1st

Cash Out singles chronology
"Cashin' Out" (2012)	"Big Booty" (2012)	"Hold Up" (2012)

"Big Booty" is a song by American rapper Cash Out. It was first released via SoundCloud on July 15, 2012, before being released to streaming services on July 31, 2012. The song was produced by FKi 1st.

== Critical reception ==
DJ Ill Will of HotNewHipHop gave a favorable review of the song, writing "Cash Out continues to impress with each new leak, and Big Booty is no exception. It's [sic] strengthens Cash Out's already impressive body of work, which has seen positive change over the years."

== Charts ==
Chart (2012)	Peak position
US Bubbling Under Hot 100 (Billboard)	13
US Hot R&B/Hip-Hop Songs (Billboard)	70
