= Migos =

American hip-hop group

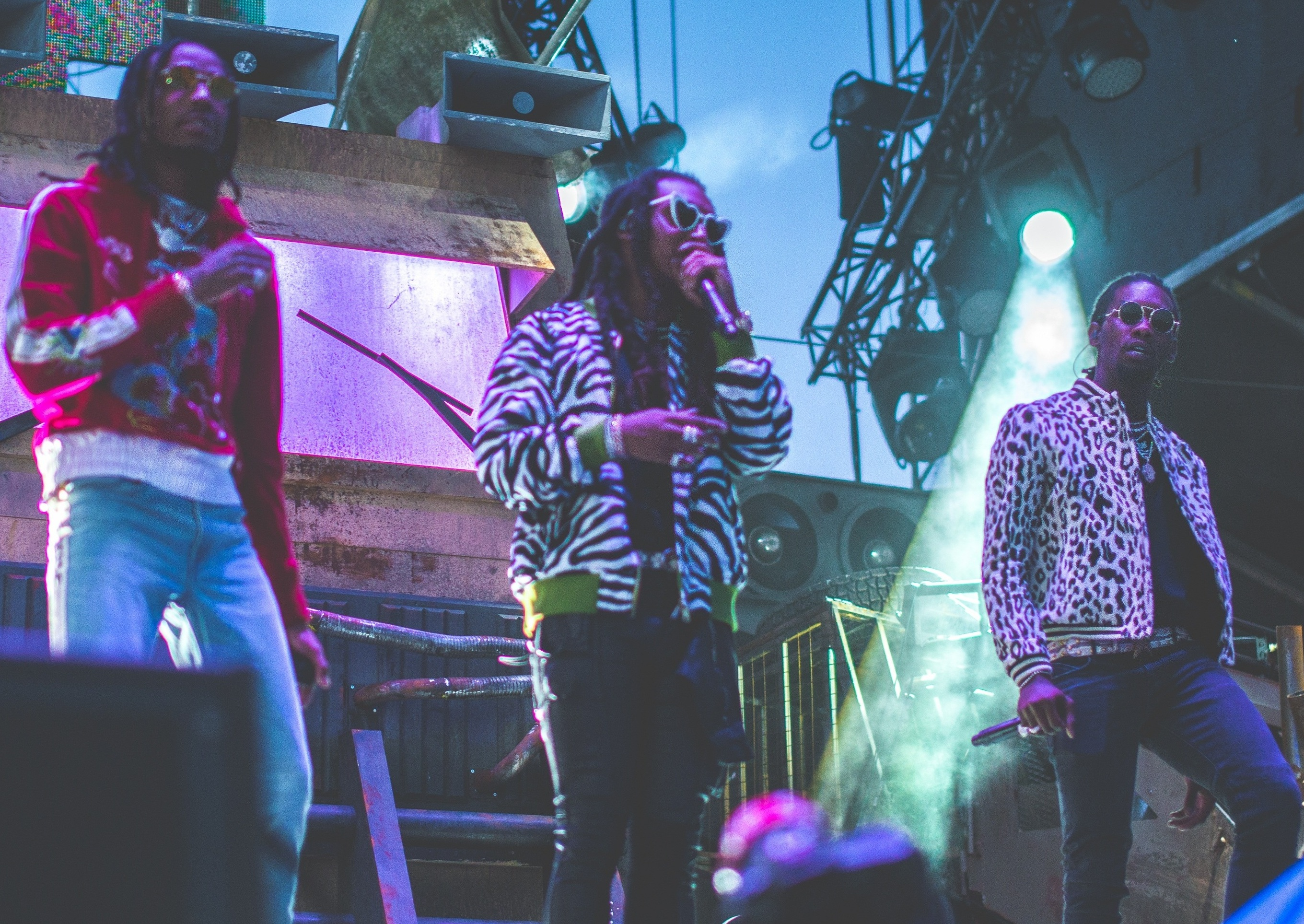
- Migos performing at the 2017 Veld Festival. From left to right: Quavo, Takeoff, and Offset

Background information
- Also known as: Yung Rich Nation
- Origin: Lawrenceville, Georgia, U.S.
- Genres: Southern hip-hop; trap
- Works: Migos discography
- Years active: 2008–2023; 2026–present
- Labels: Quality Control; YRN; Motown; Capitol; 300; Atlantic
- Spinoffs: Huncho Jack; Unc & Phew
- Members: Quavo; Offset
- Past members: Takeoff
- Website: migosofficial.com

Migos (/ˈmiːɡoʊs/ MEE-gohss) is an American hip hop trio founded in Lawrenceville, Georgia, in 2008. The group originally comprised rapper Quavo, his late nephew Takeoff, and their longtime mutual friend Offset. Quavo was born in Athens, Georgia, but grew up in Lawrenceville, where Offset and Takeoff were born and raised. As a group, they were managed by Coach K, the former manager of Gucci Mane and Jeezy, and frequently collaborated with producers DJ Durel, Murda Beatz, Zaytoven, and Buddah Bless. Recognized for their contribution to trap music in the 2010s, Billboard stated that the group "influenced pop culture and the entire English language by bringing their North Atlanta roots to the mainstream".

Migos' 2013 debut single, "Versace" spawned from their third mixtape Y.R.N. (Young Rich Niggas), which was released in June of that year. The song was remixed by Canadian rapper Drake, leading to its entry on the Billboard Hot 100; it was followed by "Fight Night" and "Look at My Dab", which were released in the following two years. Their 2016 single, "Bad and Boujee" (featuring Lil Uzi Vert), peaked atop the chart, while their 2017 single, "MotorSport" (with Nicki Minaj and Cardi B) and 2018 singles, "Stir Fry" and "Walk It Talk It" (featuring Drake) each peaked within the top ten.

Migos signed with Quality Control Music and 300 Entertainment to release their debut studio album Yung Rich Nation (2015), which was met with positive critical reception and peaked at number 17 on the Billboard 200. Their second album, Culture (2017), debuted atop the chart and was supported by "Bad and Boujee". After departing 300 Entertainment in favor of a joint venture with Motown and Capitol Records in February 2017, the trio saw their furthest commercial success with their third album, Culture II (2018), which became their second to peak the chart and sold an estimated 200,000 album-equivalent units in its first week. Their fourth album, Culture III (2021), peaked at number two on the Billboard 200.

On November 1, 2022, Takeoff was fatally shot outside of a bowling alley in Houston, effectively causing its two remaining members to disband the following year. Quavo and Offset later reunited the group in 2026, along with announcing a final Migos album would be coming soon.

== History ==
=== 2008–2012: Formation and early releases ===
Migos was formed in 2008, by Quavo (born Quavious Keyate Marshall), Takeoff (born Kirsnick Khari Ball), and Offset (born Kiari Kendrell Cephus), and they originally called themselves the Polo Club. The name 'Migos' is a take on 'Three Amigos', as the three members grew up together. Takeoff was Quavo's nephew; despite the general public believing that Offset and Quavo were cousins, Offset later revealed he is not related to either of them and was just a classmate of Quavo. The three of them grew up together in metro Atlanta, 25 minutes northeast of Downtown in Gwinnett County. "I ain't going to sit here like, my neighborhood was hard, and I had to get out there and grind. We made it hard for ourselves. We chose to stay on the streets", Quavo said. The group first began recording music using Windows Movie Maker. The group released their first full-length project, a mixtape titled Juug Season, on August 25, 2011. They followed with the mixtape No Label on June 1, 2012. Assisted by Tucker Toenjes and Mitchell Thomas.

=== 2013: Breakthrough and Y.R.N. ===
In 2013, Migos released their breakout single "Versace". The single was produced by Zaytoven and peaked at number 99 on the US Billboard Hot 100 chart. Later that year, Canadian rapper Drake brought the single more recognition when he remixed the song, adding a verse, which he would later perform at the 2013 iHeartRadio Music Festival. On June 13, Migos released their mixtape Y.R.N. (Young Rich Niggas), which features the lead single "Versace", to critical acclaim. Brandon Soderberg of Spin gave it 8 out of 10 stars, commenting that it "is a super-cut of Dirty South vibes" and compared the three members to Gucci Mane, Soulja Boy, and Future.

On June 15, 2013, the group performed at rap radio station Hot 107.9's Birthday Bash. In October 2013, the group was featured in XXL's section "Show & Prove". "Versace" was placed in multiple year-end lists of 2013, including number three on XXL's "The 25 Best Songs of 2013", number four on Complex's "The 50 Best Songs of 2013", number five on SPIN's "50 Best Songs of 2013", number 38 on Pitchfork's "The Top 100 Tracks of 2013" and number 69 on Rolling Stone's "The 100 Best Songs of 2013". Y.R.N. (Young Rich Niggas) was named the 27th-best album of 2013 and sixth-best hip-hop album of 2013 by SPIN.

=== 2014–2015: Mixtapes and Yung Rich Nation ===
On February 25, 2014, Migos released the sequel to their second mixtape, titled No Label 2. The tape was downloaded over 100,000 times in the first week of its release and was certified gold on mixtape sharing site DatPiff. No Label 2 was met with generally positive reviews from music critics. Consequence of Sound described it as "the perfect mix of raucous party tunes and triumphant rap anthems for your next BBQ or block party" and Exclaim! commented that it "is packed with potential hits". Vibe also praised the production on the tape, calling it "extensive and impressive".

On March 14, 2014, it was revealed by Migos' mixtape Y.R.N. 2, that the project had turned out to be a full-fledged album. The trio were aiming to have at least 20 songs on the album. In June 2014, it was revealed that Migos had signed a deal to 300 Entertainment, which is distributed by Atlantic Records. In June 2014, their single "Fight Night" was featured on XXL's "25 Best Songs of 2014 so far" list. It peaked at number 69 on the Billboard Hot 100. Following the release of their mixtape, Rich Nigga Timeline, which was released on November 5, 2014, Rolling Stone voted it the 7th-best rap album of 2014.

On February 5, 2015, Migos released the first single from the album, titled "One Time". On March 23, 2015, the group released a music video for the single, as a part of a cross-promotion with the YouTube Music Awards. The single peaked at number 34 on the US Hot R&B/Hip-Hop Songs. After a slight delay, because of the Georgia Southern University incident (which led to Offset's incarceration), Migos' debut album, Yung Rich Nation (originally titled Y.R.N.: Tha Album), was released on July 31, 2015, featuring guest appearances from Chris Brown and Young Thug. Yung Rich Nation received generally positive reviews from music critics. In its first week, the album sold 15,000 copies and came in at number 3 on the Top Rap Albums Charts.

During this time, it was revealed that the group had already completed their second studio album. Referring to this album's release, in an interview with DJ Whoo Kid, Takeoff said, "its all about timing". Migos stated that the track "Fantastic", featuring Lil Wayne, would be included on the album. In addition, they confirmed they would also like to collaborate with rapper Nas. In September 2015, Migos went independent. They left 300 Entertainment as they felt that Quality Control Music could manage them alone and this would also increase their revenue stream. Under 300 Entertainment, they made approximately US$30,000–40,000 per show; however, through Quality Control they made upwards of US$60,000.

On September 17, 2015, Migos released a new mixtape titled Back to the Bando. Although fellow member Offset was still incarcerated, Migos continued to release music. The first song off the mixtape, "Look at My Dab", was released on September 6. It was officially released as a single through iTunes on October 30. The song gained worldwide attention, due to Migos and other celebrities, like Odell Beckham Jr. and Cam Newton, doing the signature dance move called "dabbing". On October 22, 2015, Migos and Rich the Kid released Streets on Lock 4. Migos were originally supposed to release the collaboration mixtape with Young Thug titled MigoThuggin in late 2016 but shelved it. Their follow up mixtape to YRN, Young Rich Niggas 2, was released on January 18.

=== 2016–2022: Culture trilogy and mainstream success ===
On September 7, 2016, Kanye West announced that he had signed Migos to a management deal with his GOOD Music imprint, but in January 2017 the group stated that they are not affiliated with West's label. On October 28, 2016, Migos released the first single of their new album Culture. The single was titled "Bad and Boujee". The song was produced by Metro Boomin and features vocals from fellow American rapper Lil Uzi Vert. The music video for the single was released on October 31. The single went on to top the Billboard Hot 100, becoming Migos' first number one single in the US.

Their second album, Culture, was released on January 27, 2017. In April, Migos were featured on Katy Perry's song "Bon Appétit" from her fifth studio album, Witness. On May 30, Migos (branded by Quality Control) released "Too Hotty" which is featured on the compilation album, Quality Control: Control the Streets Vol. 1, released on December 19, 2017. The single was officially released on streaming services on August 24, 2017. The music video was released on August 25. On June 16, the Migos (alongside Lil Yachty) were featured on the Steve Aoki song "Night Call". On October 27, Migos officially released "MotorSport", the lead single off their third studio album Culture II, along with Cardi B and Nicki Minaj. The second single, "Stir Fry", was released on the official Migos YouTube channel, on December 20, 2017. Produced by Pharrell Williams, the song was later used for the 2018 NBA All-Star Weekend.

A promotional single, titled "Supastars", was released on January 22, 2018. It was produced by Honorable C.N.O.T.E., Buddah Bless, and Quavo; it was co-produced by DJ Durel. On January 26, 2018, Culture II was released. The album contains twenty-four tracks, featuring production from Metro Boomin, Dun Deal, Murda Beatz, Travis Scott, Zaytoven and others. In October 2018, Quavo stated that Culture III would be released in early 2019. The album was then delayed and rescheduled for release in early 2020. However, the album was pushed back again, due to the COVID-19 pandemic. Quavo spoke to Billboard in March 2020, and announced the group's decision to hold off on the release of Culture III, explaining it was largely due to their inability to properly roll out the album once social distancing rules went into effect in most states in the US. While on Lil Wayne's Young Money Radio show on Apple Music, on May 22, 2020, Migos announced they would change the title from Culture III to another title. However, this was reverted on May 17, 2021, when the group announced via Instagram that Culture III would be released June 11 of the same year under its original name.

=== 2022–2026: Internal conflict, death of Takeoff and temporary disbandment ===
In 2022, the group was rumored to have broken up after Quavo's ex-girlfriend Saweetie had reportedly slept with Offset. Quavo alluded to the rift in the song "Messy" and in an interview where he insinuated Offset's lack of loyalty. In October 2022, Quavo and Takeoff subsequently released an album without Offset titled Only Built for Infinity Links.

On November 1, 2022, Takeoff was fatally shot while with Quavo and others at a Houston bowling alley. The shooting occurred around 2:34 a.m. local time at the 810 Billiards and Bowling Houston.

On February 5, 2023, Quavo performed "Without You" in tribute to Takeoff during the "In Memoriam" segment of the 65th Annual Grammy Awards. On February 22, 2023, Quavo posted a music video for his song "Greatness", which was interpreted as confirmation that the group has broken up. Quavo and Offset later gathered with family to celebrate Takeoff's posthumous birthday on June 18, 2023. On June 25, 2023, Quavo and Offset reunited on stage together (for the first time since the group's separation) for a tribute performance dedicated to Takeoff at the BET Awards 2023. Offset later clarified that the performance was their way of respectfully ending Migos in honor of Takeoff, while also giving them the opportunity to pay their final public tribute.

On October 5, 2023, in an interview with Hot 97, Offset confirmed that Migos had officially disbanded. He conveyed that contrary to popular belief, that the group's disbandment was not due to issues he may have had with Quavo. The death of Takeoff, who he described as "the glue" and the "real leader", had ended any possibility of the group continuing, and said that "it wouldn't be right" to continue the group without him.

=== 2026-present: Migos reunion and upcoming final album ===
In an interview on August 7, 2025, Offset clarified that he and Quavo have continued to maintain their relationship and still speak "every other week". On August 14, 2025, when asked about reuniting with Quavo for a new Migos project, Offset said "It’s possible. It’s not impossible".

On May 3, 2026, Offset posted a photo of himself and Quavo in a recording studio to his Instagram story. Quavo and Offset's reunion was later officially revealed in a post uploaded by the official Migos Instagram account on May 5, 2026.

In September 2026, Quavo confirmed that work on a final Migos album is currently underway, and stated he and Offset were currently on track to finish the album by the end of the year and planning a subsequent reunion tour. In October and November 2026, Offset was featured on the track "Away" from Quavo's fourth studio album, Qrömelife, while Quavo appeared on the tracks "R4W" and "Why Not", also from Offset's fourth studio album, GMFU. These songs marked their first musical collaborations as a duo in four years.

On November 13, 2026, when asked about the upcoming Migos album and how unreleased Takeoff music might be incorporated into the project, Offset stated, "Can't do it without bro, a million percent. Each song, he'll be on everything. That's the only way to do it, we wouldn't do it without him."

== Legal issues ==
=== Prior to fame ===
In 2013, Offset was incarcerated in Georgia's DeKalb County Jail for violating his probation that he had received due to felony convictions for burglary and theft.

=== Georgia Southern University concert incident ===
On April 18, 2015, Migos were scheduled to headline Georgia Southern University's spring concert at Hanner Fieldhouse in Statesboro, Georgia. The show started at 7:00 pm EDT with local opening acts; however, Migos took the stage nearly an hour and a half past their scheduled 9:00 pm set time. While their performance contract had a stipulated minimum set length of 45 minutes, the group performed for less than 30 minutes before leaving the stage. The University Police Department, the Statesboro Police Department and the Bulloch County Sheriff's Office, who were present at the concert as security detail, detected a strong scent of marijuana from the group's vans, and the drivers were questioned by law enforcement. Upon further investigation, the rap trio and 12 members of their entourage were arrested for possession of marijuana and another Schedule II controlled substance, possession of firearms within a school safety zone, possession of firearms during the commission of a crime, and possession of firearms by convicted felons.

While university officials were aware of Migos' reputation, the group was allowed to perform, as they had received the most votes among seven bands and artists up for consideration for the spring concert in a student poll, and student activity fees and ticket sales were used to pay for the concert. According to the performance contract, the group was to be paid $30,000 with their promoter Big House Collective receiving an additional $3,000. University officials had initially sought to put Migos in breach of contract due to the group's late arrival, shortened performance, and possession of contraband on university property; however, the university ultimately paid half of the agreed-upon fees.

On April 20, 2015, Takeoff, Quavo, and six members of their entourage were released on bond by the Bulloch County District Attorney's Office while Offset and six others remained in custody without bond. As a result of their arrests, on April 28, 2015, Migos postponed their Yung Rich Nation Tour until July.

On May 2, 2015, Offset, while in custody, was charged with battery and inciting a riot within a penal facility after attacking another inmate, causing severe injury. In a bond hearing before Bulloch County Superior Court Judge John R. Turner on May 8, 2015, Offset was formally denied bond based on his prior criminal record as well as the jail fight. During the hearing, two members of Migos' entourage were also denied bonds while four others were granted bonds and were barred from returning to Bulloch County as a condition of their release. Also, Judge Turner directed the four who were released not to make contact with anyone involved in the case. Offset's attorney argued that the rap trio were unfairly profiled by law enforcement and that officers had failed to prove ownership of the firearms and illicit drugs found within the two vans; however, the prosecution responded that law enforcement were present at the concert for the safety of the students and public at-large due to Migos' history of violence. Upon hearing the decision, Offset shouted obscenities as he was escorted out of the courtroom.

After eight months in custody, Offset was released on December 4, 2015, after accepting an Alford plea deal. The plea deal dropped the gun, drug, and gang-related charges in exchange for pleading guilty to inciting a riot within a penal facility; paying a $1,000 fine; serving five years' probation; and banishment from Bulloch, Effingham, Jenkins, and Screven Counties. Takeoff, facing misdemeanor marijuana charges, also accepted a plea deal and was sentenced with 12 months' probation. Quavo pleaded no contest to misdemeanor marijuana charges and received a 12-month suspended sentence.

=== Other incidents ===
On March 17, 2016, Offset was arrested for driving with a suspended license in Atlanta but was released the next day without having charges filed against him. Offset has since claimed his license was never suspended and the police detained him without probable cause.

On July 7, 2017, Takeoff was asked to leave a flight from Atlanta to Des Moines, Iowa, after he refused to move his bag from the floor to an overhead storage bin prior to takeoff.

In 2017, South Florida rapper XXXTentacion claimed the group injured him and pulled a gun on him.

In March 2018, the Washington Avenue Armory in Albany, New York sued the group for allegedly inciting a riot at the venue in 2015, when six people were stabbed. A concertgoer who suffered facial injuries also sued the band and the venue.

== Discography ==
Studio albums

- Yung Rich Nation (2015)
- Culture (2017)
- Culture II (2018)
- Culture III (2021)

== Tours ==
=== Headlining ===
- Back To The Bando Tour (2015)
- The Dab Tour (2016)

=== Co-headlining ===
- Aubrey & the Three Migos Tour (with Drake) (2018)

=== Supporting Act ===
- One Hell of a Nite Tour (with Chris Brown) (2015)
- Nobody Safe Tour (with Future) (2017)

== Filmography ==
=== Film ===
Films with year, title, and role
Year	Title	Role	Notes
2014	Bando	Quavo, Takeoff, and Offset*	Short film

=== Television ===
Television shows with year, title, and role
Year	Title	Role	Notes
2016	Atlanta	Quavo, Takeoff, and Offset*	Episode: "Go for Broke"
2022	WWE Day 1	Themselves	Guest appearance (pay-per-view)

== Awards and nominations ==
Year	Awards	Nominated work	Category	Result	Ref.
2014	BET Hip Hop Awards	Themselves	Rookie of the Year	Nominated	
2014	BET Hip Hop Awards	"Fight Night"	Best Club Banger	Nominated	
2014	BET Hip Hop Awards	No Label II	Best Mixtape	Won	
2015	BET Awards	Themselves	Best Group	Won	
2017	Billboard Music Awards	"Bad and Boujee" (featuring Lil Uzi Vert)	Top Rap Song	Nominated	
2017	Billboard Music Awards	"Bad and Boujee" (featuring Lil Uzi Vert)	Top Rap Collaboration	Won	
2017	BET Awards	Themselves	Best Group	Won	
2017	BET Awards	"Bad and Boujee" (featuring Lil Uzi Vert)	Best Collaboration	Won	
2017	BET Awards	"Bad and Boujee" (featuring Lil Uzi Vert)	Video of the Year	Won	
2017	BET Awards	"Bad and Boujee" (featuring Lil Uzi Vert)	Viewers' Choice Award	Won	
2017	MTV Video Music Awards	"Bad and Boujee" (featuring Lil Uzi Vert)	Best Hip Hop Video	Won	
2017	MTV Europe Music Awards	"Bon Appétit" (with Katy Perry)	Best Video	Won	
2018	Grammy Awards	Culture	Best Rap Album	Nominated	
2018	Grammy Awards	"Bad and Boujee" (featuring Lil Uzi Vert)	Best Rap Performance	Nominated	
2018	iHeartRadio Music Awards	Themselves	Best Duo/Group of the Year	Won	
2018	iHeartRadio Music Awards	"Bad and Boujee" (featuring Lil Uzi Vert)	Hip-Hop Song of the Year	Won	
2018	iHeartRadio Music Awards	Themselves	Hip-Hop Artist of the Year	Nominated	
2018	BET Awards	Culture II	Album of the Year	Nominated	
2018	BET Awards	"Walk It Talk It" (featuring Drake)	Video of the Year	Won	
2018	BET Awards	"MotorSport" (with Cardi B & Nicki Minaj)	Coca-Cola Viewers' Choice Award	Nominated	
2018	BET Awards	Themselves	Best Duo/Group	Nominated	
2018	Teen Choice Awards	Themselves	Choice Music Group	Nominated	
2018	Teen Choice Awards	Themselves	Choice Style Icon	Nominated	
2018	American Music Awards	Themselves	Favorite Duo or Group Pop/Rock	Won	
2018	MTV Europe Music Awards	Themselves	Best Group	Nominated	
2018	MTV Europe Music Awards	Themselves	Best Hip-Hop	Nominated	
2020	BET Hip Hop Awards	Themselves	Best Group of the Year	Won	
