= Migos discography =

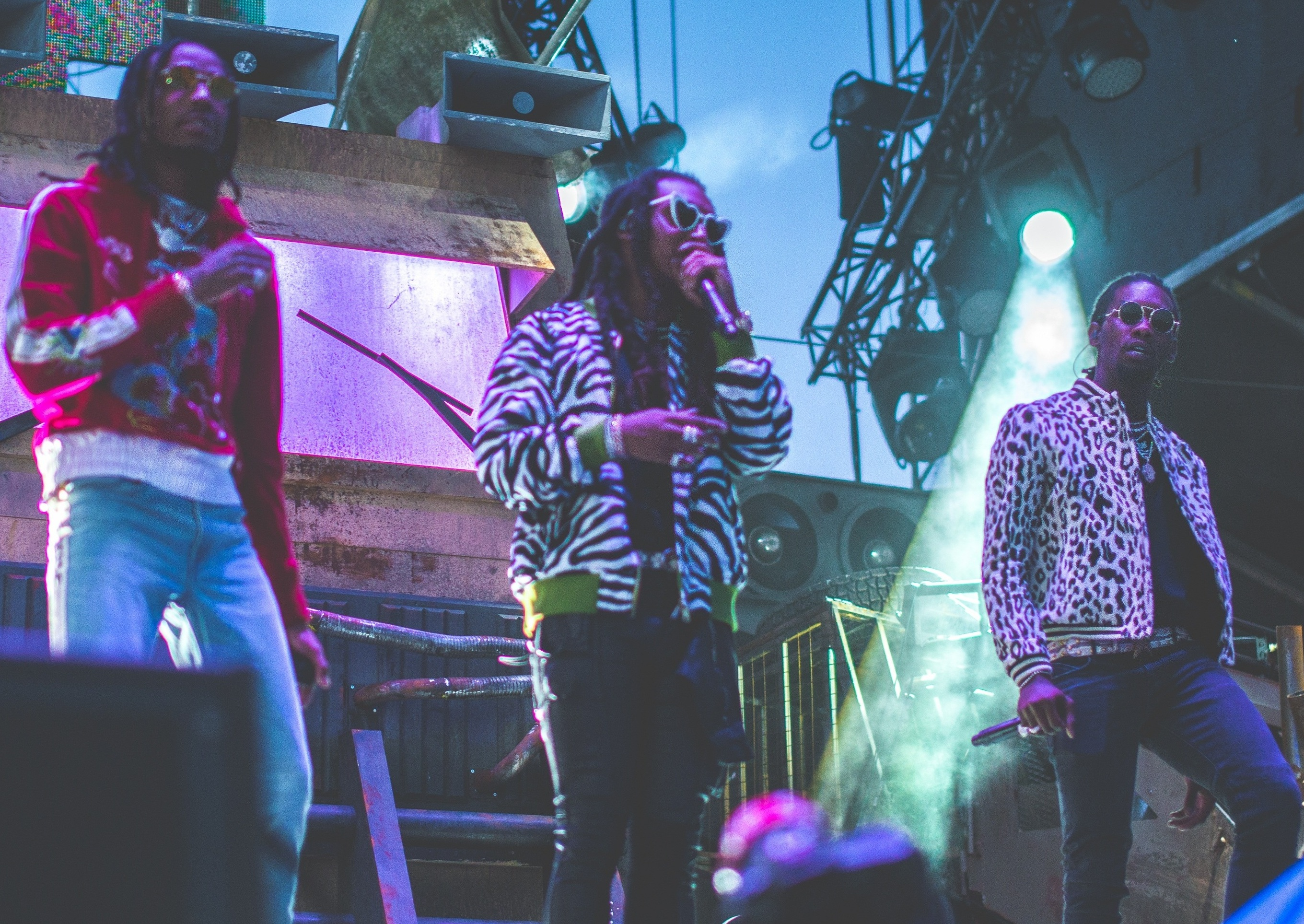
- Migos in 2017
- Studio albums: 4
- EPs: 2
- Compilation albums: 3
- Singles: 53
- Music videos: 49
- Mixtapes: 12

The discography of American hip hop group Migos consists of four studio albums, one extended play (EP), twelve mixtapes and fifty-three singles (including twenty-four as a featured artist). On July 31, 2015, Migos released their debut studio album, Yung Rich Nation. On January 27, 2017, Migos released their second studio album, Culture. On January 26, 2018, Migos released their third studio album, Culture II, tied The Beatles for most simultaneous Hot 100 songs by a group on the Billboard chart with 14. On June 11, 2021, Migos released their fourth studio album, Culture III.

== Albums ==
=== Studio albums ===
List of studio albums, with selected chart positions, sales figures and certifications
Title	Album details	Peak chart positions										Sales	Certifications
Title	Album details	US	US R&B/HH	AUS	CAN	DEN	FRA	IRE	NZ	SWE	UK	Sales	Certifications
Yung Rich Nation	Released: July 31, 2015; Label: Quality Control, 300, Atlantic; Format: CD, digital download	17	5	—	—	—	—	—	—	—	—	US: 14,596 (Note: United States first week sales figure for Yung Rich Nation.)	
Culture	Released: January 27, 2017; Label: Quality Control, 300, Atlantic; Format: CD, LP, cassette, digital download, streaming	1	1	26	1	23	44	—	20	18	16	US: 134,000 (Note: United States sales figure for Culture as of December 28, 2017.)	RIAA: Platinum; BPI: Gold
Culture II	Released: January 26, 2018; Label: Quality Control, Capitol, Motown; Format: CD, LP, digital download, streaming	1	1	13	1	3	6	10	5	11	4	US: 115,000 (Note: United States sales figure for Culture II as of January 3, 2019.)	RIAA: 2× Platinum; BPI: Gold; MC: 2× Platinum; RMNZ: Gold
Culture III	Released: June 11, 2021; Label: Quality Control, Motown; Format: CD, LP, digital download, streaming	2	2	13	3	5	5	10	4	23	9		
TBA	To Be Released: January 2027; Label: Quality Control Music, Motown Records; Format: CD, LP, digital download, streaming	TBA											
"—" denotes releases that did not chart or were not released in that territory.

=== Compilation albums ===
Title	Album details
Tru Colors (with Gucci Mane, Young Thug and Peewee Longway)	Released: May 13, 2016; Label: Quality Control, 1017, RBC; Format: CD, digital download, streaming
Quality Control: Control the Streets, Volume 1 (as part of Quality Control)	Released: December 8, 2017; Label: Quality Control, Capitol, Motown; Format: CD, digital download, streaming
Quality Control: Control the Streets, Volume 2 (as part of Quality Control)	Released: August 16, 2019; Label: Quality Control, Motown; Format: CD, digital download, streaming

== Extended plays ==
Title	EP details
Trap Symphony EP	Released: July 22, 2015; Label: Audiomack Live; Format: Digital download
3 Way	Released: July 7, 2016; Label: YRN, Quality Control; Format: Digital download

== Mixtapes ==
List of mixtapes, with selected chart positions
Title	Mixtape details	Peak chart positions			
Title	Mixtape details	US	US R&B/ HH	US Rap	US Heat.
Juug Season	Released: August 25, 2011 (US); Label: Migo Gang; Format: Digital download	—	—	—	—
No Label	Released: June 1, 2012 (US); Label: Migo Gang; Format: Digital download	—	—	—	—
Y.R.N. (Young Rich Niggas)	Released: June 13, 2013 (US); Label: Quality Control; Format: Digital download, streaming	—	74	—	41
Streets on Lock (with Rich the Kid)	Released: August 3, 2013 (US); Label: Quality Control, Rich Forever; Format: Digital download	—	—	—	—
Streets on Lock 2 (with Rich the Kid)	Released: October 1, 2013 (US); Label: Quality Control, Rich Forever; Format: Digital download	—	—	—	—
Lobby Runners (with Peewee Longway, Young Thug and Rich the Kid)	Released: December 25, 2013 (US); Label: Quality Control, Rich Forever, YSL, MPA Bandcamp; Format: Digital Download	—	—	—	—
Solid Foundation (with Quality Control)	Released: February 2, 2014 (US); Label: Quality Control; Format: Digital download	—	—	—	—
No Label 2	Released: February 25, 2014 (US); Label: Quality Control; Format: CD, digital download, streaming	175	23	17	3
Streets on Lock 3 (with Rich the Kid)	Released: April 20, 2014 (US); Label: Quality Control, Rich Forever; Format: Digital download	—	—	—	—
World War 3D: The Green Album (with Gucci Mane)	Released: June 16, 2014; Label: Quality Control, 1017; Format: Digital download	—	—	—	—
Rich Nigga Timeline	Released: November 5, 2014 (US); Label: Quality Control; Format: Digital download, streaming	—	—	—	6
Migo Lingo (with YRN Lingo)	Released: March 4, 2015 (US); Label: YRN, Quality Control; Format: Digital download	—	—	—	—
Still on Lock (with Rich the Kid)	Released: May 19, 2015; Label: YRN, Quality Control, Rich Forever; Format: Digital download	—	—	—	—
Currency	Released: September 2, 2015 (US); Label: Quality Control, Black Market; Format: Digital download	—	—	—	—
Back to the Bando	Released: September 17, 2015; Label: YRN, Quality Control; Format: Digital download	—	—	—	—
Streets on Lock 4 (with Rich the Kid)	Released: October 22, 2015; Label: YRN, Quality Control, Rich Forever; Format: Digital download	—	—	—	—
Rich Shooters	Released: November 1, 2015 (US); Label: Quality Control; Format: Digital download	—	—	—	—
Y.R.N 2 (Young Rich Niggas 2)	Released: January 18, 2016; Label: YRN, Quality Control; Format: Digital download, streaming	—	—	—	—
"—" denotes releases that did not chart or were not released in that territory.

== Singles ==
=== As lead artists ===
List of singles as lead artist, with selected chart positions, showing year released and album nam
Title	Year	Peak chart positions										Certifications	Album
Title	Year	US	US R&B/HH	AUS	CAN	DEN	FRA	IRE	NZ	SWE	UK	Certifications	Album
"Versace"	2013	99	31	—	—	—	—	—	—	—	—	RIAA: Gold	Y.R.N. (Young Rich Niggas)
"Hannah Montana"	2013	—	— (Note: "Hannah Montana" did not enter the Hot R&B/Hip-Hop Songs chart, but peaked at number six on the Bubbling Under R&B/Hip-Hop Singles chart.)	—	—	—	—	—	—	—	—		Y.R.N. (Young Rich Niggas)
"Ounces"	2013	—	—	—	—	—	—	—	—	—	—		No Label 2
"Fight Night"	2014	69	17	—	—	—	—	—	—	—	—	RIAA: Gold; RMNZ: Gold	No Label 2
"Handsome and Wealthy"	2014	79	20	—	—	—	—	—	—	—	—	RIAA: Gold	No Label 2
"One Time"	2015	— (Note: "One Time" did not enter the Billboard Hot 100, but peaked at number seven on the Bubbling Under Hot 100 Singles chart.)	34	—	—	—	—	—	—	—	—		Yung Rich Nation
"Pipe It Up"	2015	— (Note: "Pipe It Up" did not enter the Billboard Hot 100, but peaked at number six on the Bubbling Under Hot 100 chart.)	38	—	—	—	—	—	—	—			Yung Rich Nation
"Look at My Dab"	2015	87	28	—	—	—	—	—	—	—	—		Back to the Bando
"WOA"	2016	—	—	—	—	—	—	—	—	—	—		Y.R.N 2 (Young Rich N*ggas 2)
"Say Sum"	2016	—	—	—	—	—	—	—	—	—	—		Non-album singles
"Cocoon"	2016	—	—	—	—	—	—	—	—	—	—		Non-album singles
"Bad and Boujee" (featuring Lil Uzi Vert)	2016	1	1	34	5	39	77	40	17	37	30	RIAA: 4× Platinum; ARIA: Platinum; BPI: Platinum; RMNZ: 3× Platinum; SNEP: Platinum	Culture
"T-Shirt"	2017	19	11	—	16	—	127	—	— (Note: "T-Shirt" did not enter the NZ Top 40 Singles Chart, but peaked at number five on the NZ Heatseeker Singles Chart.)	—	82	RIAA: 2× Platinum; BPI: Gold; RMNZ: Platinum; SNEP: Gold	Culture
"Slippery" (featuring Gucci Mane)	2017	29	12	—	46	—	—	—	—	—	—	RIAA: Gold; BPI: Silver; RMNZ: Platinum	Culture
"Too Hotty" (as part of Quality Control)	2017	91	37	—	—	—	—	—	—	—	—		Control the Streets, Vol. 1
"MotorSport" (featuring Nicki Minaj and Cardi B)	2017	6	3	73	12	—	73	79	— (Note: "Motor Sport" did not enter the NZ Top 40 Singles Chart, but peaked at number two on the NZ Heatseekers Singles Chart.)	— (Note: "Motor Sport" did not enter the Sweden Top 100 Singles Chart, but peaked at number four on the Swedish Heatseekers Singles Chart.)	49	RIAA: 6× Platinum; ARIA: Gold; BPI: Platinum; MC: 3× Platinum; RMNZ: Platinum; SNEP: Gold	Culture II
"Stir Fry"	2017	8	5	24	19	—	159	45	18	63	51	RIAA: 5× Platinum; ARIA: Gold; BPI: Gold; MC: Platinum; RMNZ: 3× Platinum	Culture II
"Walk It Talk It" (featuring Drake)	2018	10	7	55	14	—	81	52	36	66	31	RIAA: 6× Platinum; BPI: Platinum; MC: Platinum; RMNZ: 2× Platinum; SNEP: Gold	Culture II
"Narcos"	2018	36	17	—	48	—	93	84	—	—	—	RIAA: 3× Platinum; BPI: Silver; MC: Gold; RMNZ: Platinum	Culture II
"Hot Summer" (with DJ Durel)	2018	—	—	—	—	—	—	—	—	—	—		Non-album single
"Is You Ready"	2018	—	—	—	—	—	—	—	—	—	—		MLB The Show 19
"Pure Water" (with Mustard)	2019	23	10	45	20	—	—	56	— (Note: "Pure Water" did not enter the NZ Top 40 Singles Chart, but peaked at number eight on the NZ Hot Singles Chart.)	— (Note: "Pure Water" did not enter the Sweden Top 100 Singles Chart, but peaked at number three on the Swedish Heatseekers Singles Chart.)	62	RIAA: 5× Platinum; BPI: Gold; RMNZ: 2× Platinum	Perfect Ten
"Stripper Bowl"	2019	— (Note: "Stripper Bowl" did not chart on the Billboard Hot 100, but did peak at number 19 on the Bubbling Under Hot 100 chart.)	— (Note: "Stripper Bowl" did not chart on the Hot R&B/Hip-Hop Songs, but did peak at number two on the Bubbling Under Hot R&B/Hip-Hop chart.)	—	—	—	—	—	— (Note: "Stripper Bowl" parked number 1 on the NZ Top 40 Singles Chart, but peaked at number 32 on the NZ Hot Singles Chart.)	—	—		Control the Streets, Vol. 2
"Give No Fxk" (featuring Travis Scott and Young Thug)	2020	48	19	—	60	—	164	78	— (Note: "Give No Fxk" did not enter the NZ Top 40 Singles Chart, but peaked at number 13 on the NZ Hot Singles Chart.)	— (Note: "Give No Fxk" did not enter the Sweden Top 100 Singles Chart, but peaked at number forty-five on the Swedish Heatseekers Singles Chart.)	96		Non-album singles
"Taco Tuesday"	2020	—	—	—	—	—	—	—	— (Note: "Taco Tuesday" did not chart on the NZ Top 40 Singles chart, but it did peak at number 40 on the NZ Hot Singles chart.)	—	—		Non-album singles
"Racks 2 Skinny"	2020	—	—	—	—	—	—	—	— (Note: "Racks 2 Skinny" did not chart on the NZ Top 40 Singles chart, but it did peak at number 35 on the NZ Hot Singles chart.)	—	—	RIAA: Gold	Non-album singles
"Need It" (featuring YoungBoy Never Broke Again)	2020	62	28	—	—	—	—	—	—	—	—	RIAA: 2× Platinum; RMNZ: Platinum	Culture III
"Straightenin"	2021	23	9	—	43	—	—	—	— (Note: "Straightenin'" did not enter the NZ Top 40 Singles Chart, but peaked at number eight on the NZ Hot Singles Chart.)	—	72	RIAA: Platinum	Culture III
"We Set the Trends" (with Jim Jones)	2021	—	—	—	—	—	—	—	—	—	—		Gangsta Grillz: We Set the Trends
"—" denotes releases that did not chart or were not released in that territory.

=== As featured artists ===
List of singles as featured artist, with selected chart positions, showing year released and album name
Title	Year	Peak chart positions							Certifications	Album
Title	Year	US	US R&B/HH	US Rap	AUS	CAN	FRA	UK	Certifications	Album
"Young Nigga" (Que featuring Migos)	2013	—	—	—	—	—	—	—		Non-album singles
"We Ready" (Soulja Boy featuring Migos)	2013	—	—	—	—	—	—	—		Non-album singles
"Anytime" (Sean Garrett featuring Migos)	2013	—	—	—	—	—	—	—		Non-album singles
"Shabba" (Remix) (A$AP Ferg featuring Shabba Ranks, Migos and Busta Rhymes)	2013	—	—	—	—	—	—	—		Non-album singles
"Bricks" (Carnage featuring Migos)	2014	—	48	—	—	—	—	—		Papi Gordo
"FuckEmx3" (OG Maco featuring Migos)	2014	—	—	—	—	—	—	—		OG Maco
"ATM" (Ray J featuring Dria and Migos)	2014	—	—	—	—	—	—	—		Non-album single
"#LHOMMEAUBOB" (Gradur featuring Migos)	2015	—	—	—	—	—	103	—		L'homme au bob
"Irresistible" (Remix) (Fall Out Boy featuring Migos)	2015	—	—	—	—	—	—	—		Make America Psycho Again
"Moses" (French Montana featuring Chris Brown and Migos)	2015	—	— (Note: "Moses" did not enter the Billboard Hot R&B/Hip-Hop Songs, but peaked at number 1 on the Bubbling Under R&B/Hip-Hop Singles chart, which acts as an extension to the Hot R&B/Hip-Hop Songs.)	—	—	—	—			Casino Life 2
"Can't Believe" (Young Egypt featuring Migos)	2016	—	—	—	—	—	—	—		Alive
"Bounce" (Kid Red featuring Chris Brown and Migos)	2016	—	—	—	—	—	—	—		Guilty by Association
"Bad Intentions" (Niykee Heaton featuring Migos)	2016	—	—	—	—	—	—	—	RIAA: Gold; RMNZ: Gold	The Bedroom Tour Playlist
"Key to the Streets" (YFN Lucci featuring Migos and Trouble)	2016	70	27	18	—	—	—	—	RIAA: Platinum	Wish Me Well 2: Unstoppable
"Slide" (Calvin Harris featuring Frank Ocean and Migos)	2017	25	13	—	11	16	15	10	RIAA: 4× Platinum; ARIA: 6× Platinum; BEA: Gold; BPI: 2× Platinum; FIMI: Platinum; RMNZ: 5× Platinum; SNEP: Gold	Funk Wav Bounces Vol. 1
"Gucci on My" (Mike Will Made It featuring 21 Savage, YG and Migos)	2017	— (Note: "Gucci On My" did not enter the Billboard Hot 100, but peaked at number 10 on the Bubbling Under Hot 100 Singles chart.)	41	—	—	—	—	—		Ransom 2
"Peek a Boo" (Lil Yachty featuring Migos)	2017	78	41	—	—	73	—	—	RIAA: Gold	Teenage Emotions
"Bon Appétit" (Katy Perry featuring Migos)	2017	59	—	—	35	14	9	37	RIAA: Platinum; BPI: Gold; MC: Gold; RMNZ: Gold; SNEP: Gold	Witness
"Body" (Sean Paul featuring Migos)	2017	—	—	—	—	98	—	76		Mad Love the Prequel
"Night Call" (Steve Aoki featuring Lil Yachty and Migos)	2017	—	—	—	—	—	—	—		Steve Aoki Presents Kolony
"Nasty (Who Dat)" (A$AP Ferg featuring Migos)	2017	—	—	—	—	—	—	—		Still Striving
"I Get the Bag" (Gucci Mane featuring Migos)	2017	11	5	5	—	28	—	—	RIAA: 8× Platinum; RMNZ: Platinum	Mr. Davis
"Solitaire" (Gucci Mane featuring Migos and Lil Yachty)	2018	— (Note: "Solitaire" did not enter the Billboard Hot 100, but peaked at number eight on the Bubbling Under Hot 100 Singles chart.)	—	—	—	—	—	—		Evil Genius
"—" denotes releases that did not chart or were not released in that territory.

=== Promotional singles ===
List of promotional singles, with selected chart positions, showing year released and album name
Title	Year	Peak chart positions						Certifications	Album
Title	Year	US	US R&B/HH	US Rap	AUS	CAN	UK	Certifications	Album
"I Can" (with Hoodrich Pablo Juan)	2017	—	—	—	—	—	—		Non-album single
"Call Casting"	2017	62	25	16	—	65	—		Culture
"What the Price"	2017	— (Note: "What the Price" did not enter the Billboard Hot 100, but peaked at number two on the Bubbling Under Hot 100 Singles chart.)	41	—	—	92	—		Culture
"Supastars"	2018	53	27	25	—	51	—	RIAA: Gold	Culture II
"They Can't Win"	2018	—	—	—	—	—	—		Madden NFL 19
"Drip" (Cardi B featuring Migos)	2018	21	15	11	60	31	41	RIAA: Platinum; ARIA: Platinum; RMNZ: Gold	Invasion of Privacy
"My Family" (with Karol G, Snoop Dogg and Rock Mafia)	2019	—	—	—	—	—	—	RIAA: Gold	The Addams Family
"Avalanche"	2021	27	12	9	—	50	90		Culture III
"Picasso" (with Future)	2021	— (Note: "Picasso" did not enter the Billboard Hot 100, but peaked at number two on the Bubbling Under Hot 100 chart.)	47	—	—	—	—		Culture III
"Type Shit" (with Cardi B)	2021	71	30	—	—	—	—		Culture III
"—" denotes releases that did not chart or were not released in that territory.

== Other charted and certified songs ==
List of songs, with selected chart positions and certifications, showing year released and album name
Title	Year	Peak chart positions								Certifications	Album
Title	Year	US	US R&B/HH	US Rap	CAN	IRE	NZ Hot	SWE Heat.	SWI	Certifications	Album
"Just for Tonight" (featuring Chris Brown)	2015	— (Note: "Just for Tonight" did not enter the Billboard Hot 100, but peaked at number 17 on the Bubbling Under Hot 100 Singles chart.)	—	—	—	—	—	—	—		Yung Rich Nation
"Culture" (featuring DJ Khaled)	2017	93	36	25	82	—	—	—	—		Culture
"Get Right Witcha"	2017	72	29	19	63	—	—	—	—	RIAA: Gold; RMNZ: Gold	Culture
"Big on Big"	2017	— (Note: "Big on Big" did not enter the Billboard Hot 100, but peaked at number eight on the Bubbling Under Hot 100 Singles chart.)	47	—	—	—	—	—	—		Culture
"Brown Paper Bag"	2017	— (Note: "Brown Paper Bag" did not enter the Billboard Hot 100, but peaked at number one on the Bubbling Under Hot 100 Singles chart.)	40	—	—	—	—	—	—		Culture
"Deadz" (featuring 2 Chainz)	2017	— (Note: "Deadz" did not enter the Billboard Hot 100, but peaked at number five on the Bubbling Under Hot 100 Singles chart.)	45	—	—	—	—	—	—		Culture
"All Ass"	2017	— (Note: "All Ass" did not enter the Billboard Hot 100, but peaked at number seven on the Bubbling Under Hot 100 Singles chart.)	46	—	—	—	—	—	—		Culture
"Kelly Price" (featuring Travis Scott)	2017	58	23	15	55	—	— (Note: "Kelly Price" did not enter the NZ Top 40 Singles Chart, but peaked at number six on the Heartseeker Singles chart.)	—	—		Culture
"Out Yo Way"	2017	— (Note: "Out Yo Way" did not enter the Billboard Hot 100, but peaked at number 15 on the Bubbling Under Hot 100 Singles chart.)	— (Note: "Out Yo Way" did not enter the Hot R&B/Hip-Hop Songs chart, but peaked at number one on the Bubbling Under R&B/Hip-Hop Singles chart.)	—	—	—	—	—	—		Culture
"Blue Cheese" (2 Chainz featuring Migos)	2017	— (Note: "Blue Cheese" did not enter the Billboard Hot 100, but peaked at number 11 on the Bubbling Under Hot 100 Singles chart.)	— (Note: "Blue Cheese" did not enter the Hot R&B/Hip-Hop Songs chart, but peaked at number one on the Bubbling Under R&B/Hip-Hop Singles chart.)	—	—	—	—	—	—	RIAA: Gold	Pretty Girls Like Trap Music
"Major Bag Alert" (DJ Khaled featuring Migos)	2017	— (Note: "Major Bag Alert" did not enter the Billboard Hot 100, but peaked at number 24 on the Bubbling Under Hot 100 Singles chart.)	— (Note: "Major Bag Alert" did not enter the Hot R&B/Hip-Hop Songs chart, but peaked at number eight on the Bubbling Under R&B/Hip-Hop Singles chart.)	—	—	—	—	—	—		Grateful
"Iced Out My Arms" (DJ Khaled featuring Future, Migos, 21 Savage and T.I.)	2017	— (Note: "Iced Out My Arms" did not enter the Billboard Hot 100, but peaked at number five on the Bubbling Under Hot 100 Singles chart.)	— (Note: "Iced Out My Arms" did not enter the Hot R&B/Hip-Hop Songs chart, but peaked at number two on the Bubbling Under R&B/Hip-Hop Singles chart.)	—	—	—	—	—	—		Grateful
"Danger" (with Marshmello)	2017	82	34	—	49	—	—	—	—	RIAA: Gold	Bright: The Album
"Higher We Go (Intro)"	2018	83	40	—	77	—	—	—	—		Culture II
"BBO (Bad Bitches Only)" (featuring 21 Savage)	2018	48	24	22	52	—	—	—	—	RIAA: Platinum	Culture II
"Auto Pilot (Huncho on the Beat)"	2018	85	41	—	94	—	—	—	—		Culture II
"Emoji a Chain"	2018	87	43	—	82	—	—	—	—		Culture II
"CC" (featuring Gucci Mane)	2018	96	45	—	93	—	—	—	—		Culture II
"Too Much Jewelry"	2018	— (Note: "Too Much Jewelry" did not enter the Billboard Hot 100, but peaked at number one on the Bubbling Under Hot 100 Singles chart.)	49	—	—	—	—	—	—		Culture II
"Gang Gang"	2018	73	35	—	67	—	—	10	—	RIAA: Gold	Culture II
"White Sand" (featuring Travis Scott, Ty Dolla Sign, and Big Sean)	2018	64	31	—	58	—	—	—	—	RIAA: Gold	Culture II
"Crown the Kings"	2018	— (Note: "Crown the Kings" did not enter the Billboard Hot 100, but peaked at number 13 on the Bubbling Under Hot 100 Singles chart.)	— (Note: "Crown the Kings" did not enter the Hot R&B/Hip-Hop Songs chart, but peaked at number three on the Bubbling Under R&B/Hip-Hop Singles chart.)	—	—	—	—	—	—		Culture II
"Flooded"	2018	— (Note: "Flooded" did not enter the Billboard Hot 100, but peaked at number 20 on the Bubbling Under Hot 100 Singles chart.)	— (Note: "Flooded" did not enter the Hot R&B/Hip-Hop Songs chart, but peaked at number six on the Bubbling Under R&B/Hip-Hop Singles chart.)	—	—	—	—	—	—		Culture II
"Beast"	2018	— (Note: "Beast" did not enter the Billboard Hot 100, but peaked at number 12 on the Bubbling Under Hot 100 Singles chart.)	— (Note: "Beast" did not enter the Hot R&B/Hip-Hop Songs chart, but peaked at number two on the Bubbling Under R&B/Hip-Hop Singles chart.)	—	—	—	—	—	—		Culture II
"Open It Up"	2018	— (Note: "Open It Up" did not enter the Billboard Hot 100, but peaked at number 18 on the Bubbling Under Hot 100 Singles chart.)	— (Note: "Open It Up" did not enter the Hot R&B/Hip-Hop Songs chart, but peaked at number five on the Bubbling Under R&B/Hip-Hop Singles chart.)	—	—	—	—	—	—		Culture II
"Notice Me" (featuring Post Malone)	2018	52	26	24	35	—	4	11	55	RIAA: Platinum; MC: Gold; RMNZ: Platinum	Culture II
"Too Playa" (featuring 2 Chainz)	2018	— (Note: "Too Playa" did not enter the Billboard Hot 100, but peaked at number nine on the Bubbling Under Hot 100 Singles chart.)	— (Note: "Too Playa" did not enter the Hot R&B/Hip-Hop Songs chart, but peaked at number one on the Bubbling Under R&B/Hip-Hop Singles chart.)	—	—	—	—	—	—	RIAA: Gold	Culture II
"Raw Shit" (DaBaby featuring Migos)	2019	51	27	24	73	—	—	—	—	RIAA: Gold	Kirk
"We Going Crazy" (DJ Khaled featuring H.E.R. and Migos)	2021	— (Note: "We Going Crazy" did not enter the Billboard Hot 100, but peaked at number three on the Bubbling Under Hot 100 chart.)	47	—	—	—	—	—	—		Khaled Khaled
"Having Our Way" (featuring Drake)	2021	15	5	3	15	57	4	14	70	RIAA: Gold	Culture III
"Malibu" (featuring Polo G)	2021	65	28	25	57	—	21	—	—		Culture III
"Birthday"	2021	— (Note: "Birthday" did not enter the Billboard Hot 100, but peaked at number 11 on the Bubbling Under Hot 100 chart.)	—	—	—	—	—	—	—		Culture III
"Modern Day"	2021	61	26	23	66	—	—	—	—		Culture III
"Vaccine"	2021	— (Note: "Vaccine" did not enter the Billboard Hot 100, but peaked at number three on the Bubbling Under Hot 100 chart.)	48	—	—	—	—	—	—		Culture III
"Roadrunner"	2021	— (Note: "Roadrunner" did not enter the Billboard Hot 100, but peaked at number 16 on the Bubbling Under Hot 100 chart.)	—	—	—	—	—	—	—		Culture III
"What You See" (with Justin Bieber)	2021	— (Note: "What You See" did not enter the Billboard Hot 100, but peaked at number 25 on the Bubbling Under Hot 100 chart.)	—	—	—	—	—	—	—		Culture III
"Jane"	2021	— (Note: "Jane" did not enter the Billboard Hot 100, but peaked at number 15 on the Bubbling Under Hot 100 chart.)	—	—	—	—	—	—	—		Culture III
"Antisocial" (featuring Juice Wrld)	2021	— (Note: "Antisocial" did not enter the Billboard Hot 100, but peaked at number six on the Bubbling Under Hot 100 chart.)	—	—	—	—	—	—	—		Culture III
"Light It Up" (with Pop Smoke)	2021	— (Note: "Light It Up" did not enter the Billboard Hot 100, but peaked at number 14 on the Bubbling Under Hot 100 chart.)	—	—	79	—	17	—	—		Culture III
"—" denotes releases that did not chart or were not released in that territory.

== Guest appearances ==
List of non-single guest appearances, with other performing artists, showing year released and album name
Title	Year	Other artist(s)	Album
"Never Goin' Broke"	2013	Que, Sonny Digital	Forbes Atlanta
"Pull Up"	2013	Rich The Kid	Been About the Benjamins
"On Me"	2013	Ballout, Chief Keef	Ballout from the Streets 2
"Carolina"	2013	Dirty Dave	Dirty Dave
"Ken Nyugen"	2013	Dirty Dave, Chill Will	Dirty Dave
"Drugs Only"	2013	Dirty Dave, Chill Will	Dirty Dave
"Pesos"	2013	J. Money	The Medication
"Show Ya Pussy"	2013	R. Kelly	Black Panties
"Flavor Flav"	2013	Jermaine Miller, Flavor Flav	Zone 3
"Walk in With Me"	2013	Gucci Mane	Migo Lingo
"Sorry"	2013	Rich The Kid	Migo Lingo
"Girls Kissing Girls"	2013	Chaz Gotti, Waka Flocka Flame, Bloody Jay	808 Gotti
"Migo Lingo"	2013	Hoodrich Pablo Juan	The Block Iz Hot
"Work"	2013	Soulja Boy	The King
"Jackie Chan"	2013	Gucci Mane	The State vs. Radric Davis 2: The Caged Bird Sings
"Pocket Watching"	2014	Figg Panamera	Figg Panamera Trap Tones, Vol. 4
"Fuck the Rap Game" (Remix)	2014	Jose Guapo	Solid Foundation
"Giddyup"	2014	Fat Trel, Slutty Boyz	The Fat Gleesh Collection
"Bricks" (Remix)	2014	G4 Boyz	Ballin Wit No Deal 2
"Pajama Pants"	2014	Nick Cannon, Future, Traphik	White People Party Music
"300 Spartans"	2014	Sy Ari Da Kid, D Dash, Translee, Verse Simmonds, Que, K Camp, Stuey Rock, Tha Joker, Jose Guapo, Chaz Gotti, Bo Deal, Bambino Gold, Dae Dae, Doe Boy, Scotty ATL, Issa, John John Da Don, Fly Guy Veto, Tabius Tate, Zuse, Kidd Kidd, Nyemiah Supreme, Jacquees, Two9, Fort Knox	Ultrasound 2 (The Birth)
"Famous"	2014	Rich The Kid	Street Runnaz 83
"Trap"	2014	Rich The Kid	Finesse The Plug
"Watcha Gondo"	2014	Mendo Kelly, 116, 21 Savage	—N/a
"Whippin Babies"	2014	Lil' Mook	—N/a
"Slide Thru"	2014	Rayven Justice	I Have a Dream
"Choices (Yup) [Remix]"	2014	E40, Rick Ross	—N/a
"Pocket Watchin'"	2014	Figg Panamera	The Independent Game
"Looking for You"	2014	Justin Bieber	—N/a
"NWA"	2014	Gucci Mane, Peewee Longway, MPA Wicced, MPA Duke	Brick Factory Vol. I
"Lil Niggaz"	2014	Lil Durk, Cash Out	Signed To The Streets 2
"Work"	2014	Soulja Boy	King Soulja 2
"In My Hands"	2014	Mike Will Made-It	Ransom
"Sloppy Toppy"	2014	Travis Scott, Peewee Longway	Days Before Rodeo
"Goin' Crazy"	2014	Rich The Kid	Feels Good 2 Be Rich
"What You Know"	2014	T-Pain, Trendsetter Sense, K Camp	The Iron Way
"Legs Open Like an ATM"	2014	Derek Rhodes, Ray J	Raydation 2
"Amazing Amy"	2015	Lil Wayne	Sorry 4 the Wait 2
"#L'HOMMEAUBOB"	2015	Gradur	L'Homme Au Bob
"Mr. Miyagi"	2015	Zaytoven, Cassius Jay	Finesse: The Soundtrack
"Every City We Go"	2015	Kid Ink	Full Speed
"Lotta Respect"	2015	Boosie Badazz	Every Ghetto, Every City
"Luv in It"	2015	Verse Simmonds	—N/a
"Scooby & Shaggy"	2015	DJ Clue	Banned from CD: Part One
"No Days Off"	2015	NLA	Past Due
"Everybody on the Floor"	2015	The Game	—N/a
"Change My Mind"	2015	Avery Wilson	—N/a
"If It Wasn't for Your Pussy"	2015	Mally Mall, Young Egypt	—N/a
"Go Away" (Remix)	2015	Woop	—N/a
"Loco"	2015	Mr. Capone-E, Mally Mall	—N/a
"Zero"	2015	Young Thug	Slime Season
"Give No Fuks"	2015	Jeremih	Late Nights
"Whole Lot"	2015	DJ Funky, Akon, Solo Lucci	—N/a
"Dem Jeans"	2015	Timbaland	King Stays King
"Get Off My Line"	2015	Mally Mall	EMPIRE Presents: Triple X-Mas
"2 Piece" (Remix)	2015	Mally Mall, Eric Bellinger, Jeremih, Jazz Lazer	EMPIRE Presents: Triple X-Mas
"She Love It"	2016	Kooly Bros, Johnny Cinco	—N/a
"Bad Intentions" (Remix)	2016	Niykee Heaton	The Bedroom Tour Playlist
"Loud"	2016	Time	—N/a
"Look Alive" (Remix)	2016	Rae Sremmurd	—N/a
"Hands on It"	2016	TWRK, Sage the Gemini, Sayyi	—N/a
"Back Hurt"	2016	ASAP Ferg	Always Strive and Prosper
"Oh Me Oh My"	2016	DJ Snake, Travis Scott, G4shi	Encore
"Feeling Rich Today" (Remix)	2016	Philthy Rich, Sauce Walka, Jose Guapo	—N/a
"Baller Alert"	2016	Chocolate Droppa, T.I.	Kevin Hart: What Now? (The Mixtape Presents: Chocolate Droppa)
"??? (Where)"	2016	Ty Dolla $ign	Campaign
"Run Up a Check"	2016	Maneeyak, J Money	—N/a
"Diamond Dancing"	2016	Frenchie	—N/a
"Heard Ah That"	2016	DJ Stevie J	—N/a
"Same Place"	2016	Frenchie	Chicken Room 2
"Drop It Off"	2017	Young Dolph	Gelato
"Hold Up"	2017	French Montana, Chris Brown	—N/a
"Sacrifices"	2017	Big Sean	I Decided.
"I Know You Ain't"	2017	Steph Lecor	—N/a
"D Up"	2017	Juelz Santana, Jim Jones	—N/a
"Highlo"	2017	Mally Mall, French Montana, Jazz Lazer, B-Real	Mally's World, Vol. 1
"Seize the Block"	2017	—N/a	The Fate of the Furious (soundtrack)
"Major Bag Alert"	2017	DJ Khaled	Grateful
"Iced Out My Arms"	2017	DJ Khaled, Future, T.I., 21 Savage	Grateful
"Do What I Wanna Do"	2017	HoodRich Pablo Juan	Designer Drugz 3
"Blue Cheese"	2017	2 Chainz	Pretty Girls Like Trap Music
"Stack It Up"	2017	Bando Jonez	—N/a
"My Line"	2017	Stalley	Tell The Truth: Shame The Devil
"Five Guys"	2017	Zaytoven, Young Thug	Zaytoven Presents: Trapping Made It Happen
"Keep It 100"	2018	Kid Red, Chris Brown	Red Alert
"Fucking Up Profits"	2018	—N/a	Before Anythang (soundtrack)
"Waterworld"	2018	Carnage	Battered Bruised & Bloody
"What You Know" (Remix)	2018	Trendsetter Sense, T-Pain	—N/a
"Raw Shit"	2019	DaBaby	Kirk
"Work for it (Remix)"	2019	Jane Zhang	Past Progressive
"We Going Crazy"	2021	DJ Khaled, H.E.R	Khaled Khaled

== Music videos ==
=== As lead artist ===
List of music videos as lead artist, showing year released and directors
Title	Year	Director(s)
"R.I.P."	2013	Cricket
"Dennis Rodman" (featuring Gucci Mane)	2013	Cricket
"Chirpin"	2013	Cricket
"Chinatown"	2013	Gabriel Hart
"Bando"	2013	Cricket
"FEMA"	2013	Mike Ryan
"Adios"	2013	Cricket
"Versace"	2013	Gabriel Hart
"Jumpin Out The Gym" (featuring Riff Raff and Trinidad James)	2013	Gabriel Hart
"Hannah Montana"	2013	Gabriel Hart
"Emmitt Smith"	2014	Gabriel Hart
"Who The Hell"	2014	Keemotion
"Came In" (featuring Peewee Longway)	2014	Keemotion
"Fight Night"	2014	Gabriel Hart
"Freak No More"	2014	Cam Kirk
"Handsome and Wealthy"	2014	Gabriel Hart
"Top Floor" (featuring Johnny Cinco)	2014	Gabriel Hart
"Story I Tell"	2014	Keemotion
"Trenchez" (featuring Skippa Da Flippa)	2014	Keemotion
"Black Bottles" (featuring Rick Ross)	2014	Dre Films
"What Else You Heard" (featuring Skippa Da Flippa)	2014	Tra-V McFilms
"Wishy Washy"	2015	Gabriel Hart
"Cross the Country"	2015	Shomi Patwary
"One Time"	2015	Ninian Doff
"Origin"	2015	Gabriel Hart
"Pipe It Up"	2015	Motion Family
"Trap Problems"	2015	ShotByDJ
"Forest Whitaker"	2015	ShotByDJ
"Say So"	2015	ShotByDJ
"Look at My Dab"	2015	Gabriel Hart
"On a Mission"	2016	ShotByDJ
"Commando"	2016	Joe Yung Spike
"Say Sum"	2016	Gabriel Hart
"Cocoon"	2016	Daps
"3 Way (Intro)"	2016	Keemotion
"Bad and Boujee" (featuring Lil Uzi Vert)	2016	Daps
"Call Casting"	2017	Keemotion
"T-Shirt"	2017	Daps and Quavo
"Deadz" (featuring 2 Chainz)	2017	Daps and Migos
"What the Price"	2017	Daps and Migos
"Get Right Witcha"	2017	King Content
"Slippery" (featuring Gucci Mane)	2017	Daps and Migos
"Too Hotty"	2017	Daps and Migos
"Danger" (with Marshmello)	2017	R.J Sanchez and Brendan Vaughan
"MotorSport" (featuring Nicki Minaj and Cardi B)	2017	Bradley&Pablo and Quavo
"Stir Fry"	2018	Sing J. Lee and Quavo
"Walk It Talk It" (featuring Drake)	2018	Daps and Quavo
"Narcos"	2018	Quavo
"Give No Fxk" (featuring Travis Scott and Young Thug)	2020	Joseph Desrosiers Jr.
"Need It" (featuring YoungBoy Never Broke Again)	2020	
"Straightenin"	2021	
"Avalanche"	2021	
"How We Coming"	2021	

=== As featured artist ===
List of music videos as a featured artist, showing year released and directors
Title	Year	Director(s)
"Pesos" (J Money featuring Migos)	2013	44 Dawgs
"We Ready" (Soulja Boy featuring Migos)	2013	Gabriel Hart
"Bricks" (Carnage featuring Migos)	2013	Tyler Yee
"Jackie Chan" (Gucci Mane featuring Migos)	2013	Mike Ryan
"Flavor Flav" (J Money featuring Migos)	2014	iNightLyfe
"Pocket Watching" (Figg Panamera featuring Migos)	2014	—N/a
"300 Spartans" (Sy Ari Da Kid featuring D Dash, Translee, Verse Simmonds, Que, K Camp, Stuey Rock, Tha Joker, Jose Guapo, Chaz Gotti, Bo Deal, Bambino Gold, Dae Dae, Doe Boy, Scotty ATL, Issa, John John Da Don, Fly Guy Veto, Migos, Tabius Tate, Zuse, Kidd Kidd, Nyemiah Supreme, Jacquees, Two9 and Fort Knox)	2014	BPace Productions and Dontell Antonio
"Trap" (Rich The Kid featuring Migos)	2014	A Zae Production
Gas In My Tank" (Soulja Boy featuring Migos)	2014	Hi-Def
"ATM" (Ray J featuring Dria and Migos)	2014	Matt Alonzo
"Goin' Crazy" (Rich The Kid featuring Migos)	2014	Gabriel Hart
"Got It on Me" (Kirko Bangz featuring Migos)	2014	—N/a
"Pajama Pants" (Nick Cannon featuring Migos, Traphik and Future)	2015	Gabriel Hart
"2 Piece" (Mally Mall featuring Migos and Rayven Justice)	2015	Tha Razor
"Loco" (Mr. Capone-E featuring Migos and Mally Mall)	2015	JD Films
"Thank Yo Mama" (Malachiae Warren featuring Migos)	2015	Payne Lindsey
"If It Wasn't for Your Pussy" (Mally Mall featuring Migos and Young Egypt)	2015	Santiago Salviche
"Moses" (French Montana featuring Chris Brown and Migos)	2015	Spiff TV
"Actavis" (Soulja Boy featuring Migos)	2015	Justin Petrone
"Loud" (Time featuring Migos)	2016	—N/a
"Can't Believe" (Young Egypt featuring Migos)	2016	—N/a
"Key to the Streets" (YFN Lucci featuring Migos and Trouble)	2016	Marc Diamond
"Back Hurt" (A$AP Ferg featuring Migos)	2016	Shomi Patwary
"Bad Intentions" (Niykee Heaton featuring Migos)	2016	Daps
"Heard Ah That" (DJ Stevie J featuring Migos)	2016	Brandon Lovera
"??? (Where)" (Ty Dolla Sign featuring Migos)	2016	Gabe Shaddow and Ty Dolla Sign
"Hold Up" (French Montana featuring Chris Brown and Migos)	2017	Keemotion
"Gucci on My" (Mike WiLL Made-It featuring 21 Savage, YG and Migos)	2017	Motion Family
"Peek A Boo" (Lil Yachty featuring Migos)	2017	Millicent Hailes
"Body" (Sean Paul featuring Migos)	2017	Daps
"Bon Appétit" (Katy Perry featuring Migos)	2017	Dent de Cuir
"Sacrifices" (Big Sean featuring Migos)	2017	Kid. Studio
"Blue Cheese" (2 Chainz featuring Migos)	2017	Daps
"Night Call" (Steve Aoki featuring Lil Yachty and Migos)	2017	Ours&Yours
"I Get the Bag" (Gucci Mane featuring Migos)	2017	Eif Rivera
"Hands on It" (TWRK featuring Migos, Sage the Gemini and Sayyi)	2018	—N/a
"Solitaire" (Gucci Mane featuring Migos)	2018	Clifton Bell
"Hot Summer" (DJ Durel featuring Migos)	2018	Gabriel Hart
"Pure Water" (Mustard featuring Migos)	2019	Colin Tilley
"We Going Crazy" (DJ Khaled featuring H.E.R. & Migos)	2021	
"We Set the Trends" (Jim Jones featuring Migos)	2021	
"We Set the Trends" (remix) (Jim Jones featuring Migos, Lil Wayne, Juelz Santana & DJ Khaled)	2022	

== See also ==
- Quavo discography
- Offset discography
- Takeoff discography
