= What the Price =

2017 promotional single by Migos

Promotional single by Migos

from the album Culture
- Released: January 19, 2017
- Genre: Hip hop; trap
- Length: 4:08
- Label: Quality Control; 300; Atlantic
- Songwriters: Quavious Marshall; Kirshnik Ball; Kiari Cephus; Ricky Harrell; Keanu Torres; William Gaskins
- Producers: Ricky Racks; Keanu Beats; 808Godz

Music video
- "What the Price" on YouTube

"What the Price" is a song by American hip hop group Migos, released on January 19, 2017 as the second promotional single from their second studio album Culture (2017). It was produced by Ricky Racks, Keanu Beats and 808Godz.

== Composition ==
The production contains guitar, while Auto-Tune is used for vocals. The lyrics reference rising prices of drugs they are dealing. Takeoff also raps about avoiding the path that preachers and teachers in his youth have encouraged him to follow and opting for a music career instead.

== Critical reception ==
Winston Cook-Wilson of Spin described the song as "Autotune-driven and pointillistic, dominated some damaged guitar licks and a melody that feels unusually mournful for the Atlanta group." Tom Breihan of Stereogum called it "a hypnotic and miasmic slapper that features some bluesy guitar-noodling" and commented "If you're going to listen to a new Migos song today, it's probably best that it's something that sounds as weirdly sad as this." HotNewHipHop wrote of the song, "It's one of those tracks that builds and builds and builds after each verse until you are absolutely head banging along with the tempo of the beat." Calum Slingerland remarked the song "provides a good look at Offset's increased attention to melody in its hook". Trent Clark of HipHopDX wrote in a review of Culture, "after dazzling with the aforementioned 'Bad and Boujee,' 'T-Shirt' and 'Call Casting,' singing about kilo deals on a cut like 'What The Price' just doesn't feel as magical and most likely stifles the group's potential to be heavyweights when it comes to crafting albums."

== Music video ==
An official music video premiered on March 23, 2017. Directed by Daps and Migos, it sees the trio performing in a forest junkyard, with a public address system consisting of electric guitars and amplifiers. The three are surrounded by broken-down cars, performing on top of them as well, and smoking barrels. They are clad in studded leather jackets, bandanas, denim and caution tape, and also flash stacks of money. Producer Zaytoven performs alongside them, playing the keytar atop an old, wrecked, upside down sedan in front of a fire. In another story of the visual, Migos enters a biker bar, where they drink vodka and discuss a shady deal, before having a slow motion brawl with customers, which involves fistfights and bottle-smashing. The group leaves the bar unscathed and rescues a girl from the biker gang they fought, with Offset winning her heart.

== Charts ==
Chart (2017)	Peak position
Canada (Canadian Hot 100)	92
US Bubbling Under Hot 100 (Billboard)	2
US Hot R&B/Hip-Hop Songs (Billboard)	41
