= Yung Rich Nation =

2015 studio album by Migos

Studio album by Migos
- Released: July 31, 2015
- Genres: Hip hop; trap
- Length: 56:30
- Labels: Quality Control; 300; Atlantic
- Producers: Deko; DJ Durel; Honorable C.N.O.T.E.; Murda Beatz; OG Parker; Zaytoven

Migos chronology
| Rich Nigga Timeline (2014) | Yung Rich Nation (2015) | 3 Way (2016) |

Singles from Yung Rich Nation
- 1. "One Time" Released: February 5, 2015; 2. "Pipe It Up" Released: July 7, 2015

Yung Rich Nation is the debut studio album by American hip hop group Migos. It was released on July 31, 2015, by Quality Control Music, 300 Entertainment and Atlantic Records. The album features guest appearances from Chris Brown and Young Thug, while the production was handled by Zaytoven, Honorable C.N.O.T.E. and Murda Beatz, among others.

== Background ==
The trio is composed of three rappers, known by their stage names Quavo, Offset and Takeoff, collectively known as Migos. The group is an Atlanta-based hip hop trio that were formed in 2011. The trio have been putting out releases of nine mixtapes that gained them such as a mass popularity at the time. On June 13, 2013, Migos released their first installment of the Y.R.N. series, titled Y.R.N. (Young Rich Niggas). On April 18, 2015, all three members were arrested on felony, gun, and drug charges, during their performance at Georgia Southern University. Quavo and Takeoff were released on $10,000 bond, while Offset still remained in custody, forcing Migos to cancel their promotional tour that would be assured to support the release of their debut album, titled Y.R.N.: Tha Album. The trio's first major label album would initially be released on the schedule date on June 16, 2015. However, the trio announced that the official release date for their upcoming debut album would have to be on July 31, 2015. The trio would later change the album's title to Yung Rich Nation, along with the change to the album's cover artwork as well.

== Promotion ==
In July 2015, Migos announced that they will be going on the Yung Rich Nation Tour, with OG Maco.

=== Singles ===
The album's first single, "One Time", was released on February 5, 2015. The music video for the song was released on March 23, 2015, it was directed by Ninian Doff. "Pipe It Up" was released on July 7, 2015, as the album's second single.

== Critical reception ==
Professional ratings
Aggregate scores
| Source | Rating |
|---|---|
| AnyDecentMusic? | 5.9/10 |
| Metacritic | 67/100 |
Review scores
| Source | Rating |
| Billboard | 3.5/5 stars |
| Consequence | B |
| Exclaim! | 6/10 |
| The Guardian | 3/5 stars |
| HipHopDX | 3.5/5 |
| Pitchfork | 7.0/10 |
| Rolling Stone | 3/5 stars |
| Spin | 7/10 |
| USA Today | 3/4 stars |
| Vice (Expert Witness) | B+ |

Yung Rich Nation was met with generally positive reviews. At Metacritic, which assigns a normalized rating out of 100 to reviews from professional publications, the album received an average score of 67, based on nine reviews. Aggregator AnyDecentMusic? gave it 5.9 out of 10, based on their assessment of the critical consensus.

Martin Caballero of The Boston Globe said, "The group compensates for meager substance with plenty of style and energy, and has enough of both to almost pull it off". Pat Levy of Consequence said, "When all is said and done, this album will be looked at as a turning point for the trio: the moment they went legit". Rebecca Haithcoat of Spin said, "It's no secret that "One Time" is a smash; with Migos' signature flow and dying-battery synths dolloped onto a smooth melody, how could it not hit in the club? And the menacing throwback slink of "Gangsta Rap" still manages to sound fresh". Meaghan Garvey of Billboard said, "Fans of Migos' mixtape work will find a lot to love: quirky but efficient bangers fit for shouting across crowded clubs, produced by Atlanta hometown heroes like Honorable C.N.O.T.E. and Zaytoven".

Craig Jenkins of Pitchfork said, "The lyricism is sharp and the cadences more varied than usual, but grim early album autobiographical cuts like "Migos Origin" and "Street Nigga Sacrifice" will likely scare off a casual listener drawn to the group by a "Fight Night" or "Handsome and Wealthy". These are all solid album cuts, but laid out in a row at the top of the tracklist, they're uninviting". Christopher R. Weingarten of Rolling Stone said, "Yung Rich Nation sticks to their addictive formula of raps that tumble out in polyrhythmic triplets and ad libs that punctuate like paintballs, all soaked in a giddy joie de vivre". Calum Slingerland of Exclaim! said, "Production-wise, the record includes what are easily some of the least memorable instrumentals that the trio has ever worked with in comparison to their catalogue of freeleases, though the continued emphasis on minimalism gives the rhymes room to breathe". Alexis Petridis of The Guardian said, "It all sounds like a victory lap rather than a step forward, but perhaps that's just as well".

== Commercial performance ==
Yung Rich Nation debuted at number 17 on the US Billboard 200 with 18,000 album-equivalent units, of which 14,000 were pure album sales. It was the eleventh highest-selling album in the United States in its debut week.

== Track listing ==
Yung Rich Nation track listing
| No. | Title | Writer(s) | Producer(s) | Length |
|---|---|---|---|---|
| 1. | "Memoirs" | Quavious Marshall; Kirsnick Ball; Kiari Cephus; Carlton Mays, Jr. | Honorable C.N.O.T.E. | 3:13 |
| 2. | "Dab Daddy" | Marshall; Ball; Cephus; Mays, Jr. | Honorable C.N.O.T.E. | 3:21 |
| 3. | "Migos Origin" | Marshall; Ball; Cephus; Xavier Dotson | Zaytoven | 3:39 |
| 4. | "Spray the Champagne" | Marshall; Ball; Mays, Jr.; Shane Lindstrom | Honorable C.N.O.T.E.; Murda Beatz | 2:40 |
| 5. | "Street Nigga Sacrifice" | Marshall; Ball; Cephus; Mays, Jr. | Honorable C.N.O.T.E. | 3:43 |
| 6. | "Highway 85" | Marshall; Ball; Cephus; Mays, Jr. | Honorable C.N.O.T.E. | 4:17 |
| 7. | "One Time" | Marshall; Ball; Cephus; Grant Decouto | Deko | 4:41 |
| 8. | "Just for Tonight" (featuring Chris Brown) | Marshall; Ball; Cephus; Lindstrom; Christopher Brown | Murda Beatz | 3:33 |
| 9. | "Pipe It Up" | Marshall; Ball; Lindstrom | Murda Beatz | 3:26 |
| 10. | "Gangsta Rap" | Marshall; Ball; Decouto; Daryl Lee; Joshua Parker | OG Parker; Deko; DJ Durel | 2:08 |
| 11. | "Playa Playa" | Marshall; Ball; Cephus; Lindstrom | Murda Beatz | 4:40 |
| 12. | "Cocaina" (featuring Young Thug) | Marshall; Ball; Lindstrom; Jeffery Williams | Murda Beatz | 5:18 |
| 13. | "Trap Funk" | Marshall; Ball; Cephus; Mays, Jr. | Honorable C.N.O.T.E. | 3:36 |
| 14. | "What a Feeling" | Marshall; Ball; Dotson | Zaytoven | 3:29 |
| 15. | "Recognition" | Marshall; Ball; Cephus; Decouto | Deko | 4:46 |
| Total length: | | | | 56:30 |

== Personnel ==
Credits adapted from the album's liner notes.

Performers

- Migos – primary artist
- Chris Brown – featured artist (track 8)
- Young Thug – featured artist (track 12)

Technical

- Colin Leonard – mastering engineer (all tracks)
- Thomas "Tillie" Mann – mixing engineer (all tracks)

Production

- Honorable C.N.O.T.E. – producer (tracks 1, 2, 4–6, 13)
- Zaytoven – producer (tracks 3, 14)
- Murda Beatz – producer (tracks 4, 8, 9, 11, 12)
- Deko – producer (tracks 7, 10, 15)
- OG Parker – producer (track 10)
- DJ Durel – producer (track 10)

== Charts ==
Chart performance for Yung Rich Nation
| Chart (2015) | Peak position |
|---|---|
| US Billboard 200 | 17 |
| US Top R&B/Hip-Hop Albums (Billboard) | 5 |
