= Walk It Talk It =

Single by Migos featuring Drake

Single by Migos featuring Drake

from the album Culture II
- Released: March 18, 2018
- Recorded: 2017
- Genre: Hip hop; trap
- Length: 4:36
- Label: Quality Control; Motown; Capitol
- Songwriters: Kirsnick Ball; Kiari Cephus; Andrew Decouto; Harbosky Martiniz Gordon; Aubrey Graham; Frederick D. Hall; Montay Humphrey; Donald B. Jenkins; Quavious Marshall; Jerel Nance; Brian Nash; Joshua Parker; Korey Roberson; Howard M. Simons
- Producers: OG Parker; Deko

Migos singles chronology
"Stir Fry" (2017)	"Walk It Talk It" (2018)	"Solitaire" (2018)

Drake singles chronology
"Lemon (Drake Remix)" (2018)	"Walk It Talk It" (2018)	"Nice for What" (2018)

Music video
- Walk It Talk It on YouTube

"Walk It Talk It" is a song by American hip hop trio Migos featuring Canadian rapper Drake. The single was released on March 18, 2018. It was included on the trio's third studio album, Culture II (2018). After the album's release, it debuted at number 18 and later peaked at number 10 on the Billboard Hot 100 after its release as the third single. The song was produced by frequent collaborators OG Parker and Deko.

== Background ==
The song is the sixth track on Migos' third studio album Culture II, which was released in January 2018. It has become one of the more popular songs on the album, being the third-highest charting of all the songs, following "Stir Fry", which peaked at number eight on the Hot 100, and "MotorSport", which reached number six. American pop star Britney Spears, used elements of the song in a remix of her hit-single "I'm a Slave 4 U" during her Piece of Me Tour.

== Music video ==
The music video, directed by Daps and Quavo, debuted on Migos' official Vevo channel on March 18, 2018. The video features guest appearances from Jamie Foxx and labelmate Lil Yachty. In the video, the trio and Drake perform on a fictional dance-themed show called Culture Ride (inspired by Soul Train), with Jamie Foxx playing fictional host Ron Delirious (a pun of the late Soul Train host Don Cornelius). In an interview conducted by Genius, Daps said that the whole video was shot on Beta Tape, which is why the highest quality is 480p on YouTube.

== Lawsuit ==
In October 2018, the group was sued by rapper M.O.S, who claimed that the song is similar to his 2007 song "Walk It Like I Talk It". The lawsuit was later dismissed.

== Charts ==
=== Weekly charts ===
Chart (2018)	Peak position
Australia (ARIA)	55
Belgium (Ultratip Bubbling Under Flanders)	10
Belgium (Ultratip Bubbling Under Wallonia)	13
Canada Hot 100 (Billboard)	14
Czech Republic Singles Digital (ČNS IFPI)	63
France (SNEP)	81
Germany (GfK)	94
Hungary (Stream Top 40)	37
Ireland (IRMA)	52
Netherlands (Single Top 100)	93
New Zealand (Recorded Music NZ)	36
Portugal (AFP)	35
Slovakia Singles Digital (ČNS IFPI)	38
Sweden (Sverigetopplistan)	66
Switzerland (Schweizer Hitparade)	41
UK Singles (OCC)	31
US Billboard Hot 100	10
US Hot R&B/Hip-Hop Songs (Billboard)	7
US Rhythmic Airplay (Billboard)	5

=== Year-end charts ===
Chart (2018)	Position
Canada (Canadian Hot 100)	52
Portugal (AFP)	109
US Billboard Hot 100	43
US Hot R&B/Hip-Hop Songs (Billboard)	22
US Rhythmic (Billboard)	36

== Certifications ==
Region	Certification	Certified units/sales
Brazil (Pro-Música Brasil)	3× Platinum	120,000^{‡}
Canada (Music Canada)	2× Platinum	160,000^{‡}
Denmark (IFPI Danmark)	Gold	45,000^{‡}
France (SNEP)	Platinum	200,000^{‡}
Italy (FIMI)	Gold	25,000^{‡}
Mexico (AMPROFON)	Gold	30,000^{‡}
New Zealand (RMNZ)	2× Platinum	60,000^{‡}
Poland (ZPAV)	Gold	25,000^{‡}
Portugal (AFP)	Gold	5,000^{‡}
Spain (PROMUSICAE)	Gold	30,000^{‡}
United Kingdom (BPI)	Platinum	600,000^{‡}
United States (RIAA)	6× Platinum	6,000,000^{‡}
^{‡} Sales+streaming figures based on certification alone.

== Release history ==
Region	Date	Format	Label	Ref.
United Kingdom	March 18, 2018	Rhythmic contemporary radio	Capitol	
United States	March 18, 2018	Urban contemporary radio	Quality Control; Capitol	
Italy	April 12, 2018	Contemporary hit radio	Universal	
