= G Koop =

American record producer and songwriter

- Born: Robert Mandell
- Origin: Boston, Massachusetts, U.S.
- Genres: Hip hop, Pop
- Occupations: Record producer; songwriter; musician
- Instruments: Keyboards; guitar; bass; drums; FL Studio
- Years active: 2002–present
- Website: gkoop.com

Robert Mandell, professionally known as G Koop, is an American Grammy Award-nominated record producer, songwriter and musician.

== Early life ==
G Koop is originally from Boston, Massachusetts. His father had a large collection of albums, and his mother contends that G Koop's first word was "doobie," interpreted as a request for The Doobie Brothers to be played. His first job was at a record store. As a young child, he learned to play a number of instruments, including guitar, bass, piano, and drums.

G Koop graduated from Berklee College of Music. While there, he studied music theory and performance. G Koop plays some of these instruments in his own studio while making his samples. Also while at Berklee, G Koop met Graham Richards and Anthony Caruso. The three have had an ongoing collaboration dubbed "G Koop and O-Man" since then.

== Career ==
G Koop moved to California in 2002 and formed a jazz band, "The People's Quintet," with drummer Donald "Duck" Bailey. Unable to find work for the group, G Koop instead began working with music production software, such as Pro Tools and Reason.

He has been called a specialist in "replaying samples", in which an original sample is reinterpreted and recreated in the studio. The resulting track is a new interpretation that is no longer under the original's copyright, but it still retains the original's character. Producers can use the new work in their own songs without having to pay the fees required to sample the original track.

G Koop first produced for the Bay Area hip-hop group Foreign Legion. The group's MC, Prozack Turner, introduced him to producer Jake One, who in turn employed G Koop as a piano teacher. The two worked together on Jake's 2008 album, White Van Music, with G Koop performing instruments. He also worked on Jake's 2009 collaboration with Freeway, The Stimulus Package. The two also partnered together on Drake's "Furthest Thing" for his 2013 Nothing was the Same album. Jake One found the original sample for "Furthest Thing" from a 1990s live gospel album that Gene Brown, a record collector, recommended to him. However, the rights owners to the song requested high fees. Instead, Jake One asked G Koop to make an interpolation of the sample to avoid publishing issues. G Koop played all the instruments—guitar, piano, organ, drums, and bass—in his studio. The album's main producer, Noah "40" Shebib, recorded the vocals for the track with a choir in Toronto.

G Koop's first major placement as producer was Nelly's "Self Esteem" featuring Chuck D, which was on Nelly's 2008 gold album Brass Knuckles. He has worked with a number of artists, including Atmosphere, Doom, Funkadelic, The Game, G Unit, Ice Cube, Pusha T, Rhymesayers, and Rihanna, among others. G Koop also wrote, produced, and played a number of songs with George Clinton on Funkadelic's 2014 First Ya Gotta Shake the Gate. The album, the first for the band in 33 years, provided 33 tracks with a number of artists, including Sly Stone, Soul Clap, and Bootsy Collins. The second single on the album, "Ain’t that Funkin’ Kinda Hard on You," was written and produced by G Koop and George Clinton. Hip Hop producer Ill Tal, in his review, called it "one of the best songs on the album and the name of George’s new auto-biography. The song is smooth, mellow, and funky with George doing most of the vocal leads." Nick DeRiso, in his review of the album for Something Else Reviews, called "Ain’t that Funkin’ Kinda Hard on You" the "perfect reintroduction of George Clinton … since it begins with a darkly ingratiating embrace rather that the expected turn-this-mother-out groove." DeRiso goes on to call the track the "standout moment from Funkadelic’s sprawling new comeback effort." Other G Koop songs were singled out in reviews as well. Ill Tal wrote of "You Can’t Unring the Bell," that it is "probably my favorite hip-hop influenced song on the album." Ill Tal went on to refer to G Koop (although not by name): "Whoever made the beat did a great job sampling a break beat for the drums and what sounds like an old horn riff from George’s vaults." G Koop's bass playing was also recognized in E.E. Bradman's review for Bass Player, who commended G Koop's bass playing on a number of tracks.

With Metro Boomin, G Koop co-produced the song "Bad and Boujee" by Migos, featuring Lil Uzi Vert—his first no. 1 hit. The song was released in October 2016, and it rose to no. 1 on the Billboard Hot 100 in January 2017. The song has gone platinum in the United States. The album the song appeared on, Migos' Culture, debuted at no. 1 on the Billboard 200. The sample pack used on the song was originally sent to Metro Boomin, and was used to make not only Bad and Boujee, but also 21 Savage's "Ocean Drive."

G Koop worked with producer Southside of 808 Mafia on DJ Khaled's 2016 "I Got the Keys," featuring Jay Z and Future. I Got the Keys has gone platinum, and rose to no. 30 on the Billboard Hot 100. The song is on the album Major Key, produced by Southside and co-produced by G Koop and Jake One as co-producers. The album was released at no. 1 on the Billboard 200, and was nominated for a Grammy for Best Rap Album.

Since then, he has worked with Ant, one of two members of Atmosphere, on Atmosphere's albums Fishing Blues and Southsiders, and in a collaboration with Brother Ali on the latter's album, "All the Beauty in this Whole Life."

G Koop's studio, "Fuzz Deluxxe," is based in Oakland. He also runs the website "Sample Replay Society," which works as a catalog for his work. He collects old instruments, such as the Clavinet and Fender Rhodes, and has several Fender guitars. He is a client of Pulse Recording.

== Selected discography ==
Year	Artist	Song title	Album	Role
2025	Big L	"U Aint Gotta Chance feat. Nas"	Harlem's Finest: Return of the King	Producer
2020	Katy Perry	"Smile"	Smile	Producer
2017	2 Chainz	"It’s a Vibe"		Producer
2016	Migos	"Bad and Boujee"	Culture	Producer
2016	DJ Khaled	"I Got the Keys"	Major Key	Songwriter/Producer
2016	Little Louie Vega	"Ain’t That Funkin Kinda Hard on You"	Louie Vega Starring… XXVIII	Producer
2016	21 Savage	"Ocean Drive"	Savage Mode	Songwriter/Producer
2016	Atmosphere		Fishing Blues	Songwriter/Engineer/Musician
2016	Atmosphere		Frida Kahlo vs. Ezra Pound	Songwriter/Engineer/Musician
2016	Rihanna	"Woo"	Anti	Producer
2016	DJ Esco	"Benjamins Burn feat. Future"	Project E.T.	Producer
2016	Royce da 5'9"	"Pray"	Layers	Producer
2015	The Game	"Last Time You Seen"	The Documentary 2	Producer
2015	The Game		The Documentary 2.5	Producer
2015	G Koop	"Butterfly feat. 13teen"	Soul Clap Presents: Tempo Dreams, Vol. 3	Featured Artist
2015	G Unit	"Boy Boy"	The Beast is G Unit	Producer
2015	Future	"The Percocet and Stripper Joint"	DS2	Songwriter/Producer
2014	Funkadelic	"Ain’t The Funkin’ Kinda Hard on You"	First Ya Gotta Shake the Gate	Songwriter/Producer/Musician
2014	Funkadelic	"In Da Kar"	First Ya Gotta Shake the Gate	Songwriter/Producer/Musician
2014	Funkadelic	"Not Your Average Rapper"	First Ya Gotta Shake the Gate	Songwriter/Producer/Musician
2014	Funkadelic	"You Can’t Unring The Bell"	First Ya Gotta Shake the Gate	Songwriter/Producer/Musician
2014	Funkadelic	"Old Fool"	First Ya Gotta Shake the Gate	Songwriter/Producer/Musician
2014	Funkadelic	"Pole Power"	First Ya Gotta Shake the Gate	Songwriter/Producer/Musician
2014	Funkadelic	"Boom There We Go Again"	First Ya Gotta Shake the Gate	Songwriter/Producer/Musician
2014	Funkadelic	"Meow Meow"	First Ya Gotta Shake the Gate	Songwriter/Producer/Musician
2014	Funkadelic	"Catchin’ Boogie Fever"	First Ya Gotta Shake the Gate	Songwriter/Producer/Musician
2014	Funkadelic	"Zip It"	First Ya Gotta Shake the Gate	Songwriter/Producer/Musician
2014	Funkadelic	"Dippety Dippety Doo Stop The Violence"	First Ya Gotta Shake the Gate	Songwriter/Producer/Musician
2014	Freeway & The Jacka	"We Holdin'"	Highway Robbery	Producer
2013	Atmosphere	All Songs	Southsiders	Engineer
2013	Latryx	"Nebula's Eye"	The Second	Producer
2013	Drake	"Furthest Thing"	Nothing was the Same	Musician
2012	Gift of Gab	"Protocol"	The Next Logical Progression	Mixer/Mastering/Production
2012	Gift of Gab	"NLP"	The Next Logical Progression	Mixer/Mastering/Production
2012	Gift of Gab	"Rise"	The Next Logical Progression	Mixer/Mastering/Production
2012	Gift of Gab	"Everything Is Fine feat. George Clinton & Latryx"	The Next Logical Progression	Mixer/Mastering/Production
2012	Gift of Gab	"Toxic feat. Martian Luther"	The Next Logical Progression	Mixer/Mastering/Production
2012	Gift of Gab	"Wack but Good People"	The Next Logical Progression	Mixer/Mastering/Production
2012	Gift of Gab	"Dream Warrior feat. Ms. K"	The Next Logical Progression	Mixer/Mastering/Production
2012	Gift of Gab	"Beyond Logic"	The Next Logical Progression	Mixer/Mastering/Production
2012	Gift of Gab	"Effed Up"	The Next Logical Progression	Mixer/Mastering/Production
2012	Gift of Gab	"Market & 8th"	The Next Logical Progression	Mixer/Mastering/Production
2012	Yo Gabba Gabba	"Atomic Frogs"	Music is… Awesome! Vol. 4	Producer
2011	Keak Da Sneak, P.S.D. The Drivah, Messy Marv	"Ghetto Love"	Da-Bidness 2	Producer
2011	Keak Da Sneak, P.S.D. The Drivah, Messy Marv	"K.I.M. (Keep It Movin)"	Da-Bidness 2	Producer
2011	Lincoln Adler	"Grateful"	Grateful	Musician/Engineer
2011	Lincoln Adler	"Visas of Freedom"	Grateful	Musician/Engineer
2011	Lincoln Adler	"Island Dreams"	Grateful	Musician/Engineer
2010	Locksmith	"Man Up"		Production
2010	Foreign Legion	"Travel Lite"		Synth
2010	Fiber	"Planecrash"	(Single)	Producer
2010	Ice Cube	"Pros vs. Joes"	I am the West	Production
2010	Lyrics Born	"I'm The Best (Funky Fresh in the Flesh)"		Production
2010	Daboy Dame	"You Better Tuck It"		Production
2009	Doom	"Microwave Mayo"	Born like This	Co-production
2009	Doom	"Rap Ambush"	Born like This	Co-production
2008	Nelly	"Self Esteem"	Brass Knuckles	Producer/Engineer
2008	Ben Barron		Spirit of the Guitar	Producer/Engineer/Mixer/Recording
2008	The Mighty Underdogs	"Gunfight feat. MF Doom"	Droppin’ Science Fiction	Musician/Engineer
2008	The Mighty Underdogs	"Want You Back"	Droppin’ Science Fiction	Musician/Engineer
2008	The Mighty Underdogs	"Ill Vacation feat. Lyrics Born"	Droppin’ Science Fiction	Musician/Engineer
2008	The Mighty Underdogs	"Lovelife feat. Ladybug Mecca"	Droppin’ Science Fiction	Musician/Engineer
2008	The Mighty Underdogs	"So Sad feat. Julian and Damien Marley"	Droppin’ Science Fiction	Musician/Engineer
2008	The Mighty Underdogs	"Escape feat. Mr. Lif and Akrobatik"	Droppin’ Science Fiction	Musician/Engineer
2008	The Mighty Underdogs	"Folks"	Droppin’ Science Fiction	Musician/Engineer
2008	Jake One	"I’m Coming feat. Black Milk and Nottz"	White Van Music	Musician
2008	Jake One	"Bless the Child feat. Little Brother"	White Van Music	Musician
2008	Jake One	"Oh Really feat. Posdnus and Slug"	White Van Music	Musician
2008	Jake One	"Trapdoor feat. MF Doom"	White Van Music	Musician
2008	Jake One	"Home feat. Vitamin D, C Note, Maine and Ish"	White Van Music	Musician
2008	Jake One	"How we Ride feat. Freeway"	White Van Music	Musician
2008	Jake One	"Get er Done feat. MF Doom"	White Van Music	Musician
2008	Jake One	"R.I.P."	White Van Music	Musician
2007	2Pac	"Resist the Temptation"	The Best of 2Pac, Pt. 1: Thug	Co-producer
2007	Young Buck	"Clean up Man"	Buck the World	Producer
2007	Subkrew	"Welcome Hell"	Entermission	Producer
2007	Subkrew	"Loose Change"	Entermission	Producer
2007	Subkrew	"Knightlife"	Entermission	Producer
2006	Prozack Turner		Bang a Thon	Engineer
