= Restroom Occupied =

2019 single by Yella Beezy featuring Chris Brown

Single by Yella Beezy featuring Chris Brown

from the album Baccend Beezy
- Released: July 19, 2019
- Recorded: 2019
- Genre: Trap; R&B
- Length: 3:36
- Label: Hitco
- Songwriters: Deandre Conway, Christopher Brown
- Producers: Chrishan, OG Parker

Yella Beezy singles chronology
| "Rich MF" (2019) | "Restroom Occupied" (2019) | "Ay Ya Ya Ya" (2019) |

Chris Brown singles chronology
| "No Guidance" (2019) | "Restroom Occupied" (2019) | "Blow My Mind" (2019) |

Music video
- "Restroom Occupied" on YouTube

"Restroom Occupied" is a song by American rapper Yella Beezy, featuring American singer Chris Brown. It was released on July 19, 2019 as the second single from Yella Beezy's mixtape Baccend Beezy (2019).

An official music video for the song was released on November 14, 2019, and features a club scenario.

== Music video ==
The video was directed by Ben Griffin. On November 14, 2019, it was uploaded to Yella Beezy YouTube account. Comedian Michael Blackson makes a cameo appearance in the video.

== Charts ==
| Chart (2019) | Peak position |
|---|---|
| US Bubbling Under Hot 100 Singles (Billboard) | 9 |
| US Bubbling Under R&B/Hip-Hop Singles (Billboard) | 1 |
| US R&B/Hip-Hop Airplay (Billboard) | 12 |
| US Rhythmic Airplay (Billboard) | 39 |

== Certifications ==
| Region | Certification | Certified units/sales |
|---|---|---|
| United States (RIAA) | Gold | 500,000^{‡} |
^{‡} Sales+streaming figures based on certification alone.
