= Culture (album) =

2017 studio album by Migos

Studio album by Migos
- Released: January 27, 2017
- Recorded: 2016
- Genres: Hip hop; trap
- Length: 58:25
- Labels: Quality Control; 300; Atlantic
- Producers: 808Godz; Bron Bron; Buddah Bless; Cardo; Cash Clay Beats; Cassius Jay; Deko; Deraj Global; DY; G Koop; Keanu Beats; Metro Boomin; Murda Beatz; Nard & B; OG Parker; Purps; Ricky Racks; Tre Pounds; XL Eagle; Zaytoven

Migos chronology
3 Way (2016)	Culture (2017)	Culture II (2018)

Singles from Culture
- 1. "Bad and Boujee" Released: October 28, 2016; 2. "T-Shirt" Released: February 14, 2017; 3. "Slippery" Released: May 16, 2017

Culture is the second studio album by American hip hop group Migos. It was released on January 27, 2017, by Quality Control Music, 300 Entertainment and Atlantic Records. The album features guest appearances from DJ Khaled, Lil Uzi Vert, Gucci Mane, 2 Chainz and Travis Scott, while the production was handled by Metro Boomin, Zaytoven, Murda Beatz, Buddah Bless, and OG Parker, among others.

Culture was supported by three singles: "Bad and Boujee", "T-Shirt" and "Slippery". The album received generally positive reviews from critics and debuted at number one on the US Billboard 200. It also topped the US Top R&B/Hip-Hop Albums chart, becoming Migos' first number-one album on both charts. The album also debuted at number one on the Canadian Albums Chart. In July 2017, the album was certified platinum by the Recording Industry Association of America (RIAA). It was nominated for Best Rap Album at the 2018 Grammy Awards.

== Background ==
The trio first initially announced that the title for their second album would be called No Label 3, however, they later changed it to Culture. After it was scheduled for release in October 2016, the release of the album was delayed due to their conflict with 300 Entertainment.

== Cover art ==
The cover artwork is made by Stole "Moab" Stojmenov, a young Italian graphic designer based in Milan, and makes explicit reference on the turning point that this album represent for Migos themselves. The cover is what Migos gave to American hip hop culture and the city of Atlanta in every sphere, from music to fashion.

== Promotion ==
=== Singles ===
On October 28, 2016, Migos released the lead single, "Bad and Boujee". The song features a guest appearance from American rapper Lil Uzi Vert, while the production was handled by Metro Boomin and G Koop. The song has topped the US Billboard Hot 100, marking the first ever number-one for Migos and Lil Uzi Vert, respectively. On June 20, 2017, "Bad and Boujee" was certified four-times platinum by the Recording Industry Association of America (RIAA).

"T-Shirt" was first released as the album's promotional single on January 6, 2017. It was later impacted urban contemporary radio as the album's second single on February 14, 2017. The song was produced by Nard & B and XL Eagle. It peaked at number 19 on the Billboard Hot 100.

"Slippery" featuring Gucci Mane, was released as the album's third single on May 16, 2017. The song was produced by Deko and OG Parker. It peaked at number 29 on the Billboard Hot 100.

=== Promotional singles ===
The first promotional single, "Call Casting", was released on January 13, 2017. The song was produced by Buddah Bless. It peaked at number 62 on the Billboard Hot 100.

The second promotional single, "What the Price", was released on January 19, 2017. The song was produced by Ricky Racks, Keanu Beats and 808Godz.

== Critical reception ==
Professional ratings
Aggregate scores
Source	Rating
AnyDecentMusic?	7.1/10
Metacritic	79/100
Review scores
Source	Rating
AllMusic	5/5 stars
The A.V. Club	B+
Consequence	B
The Irish Times	4/5 stars
The New Zealand Herald	4/5 stars
The Observer	3/5 stars
Pitchfork	8.1/10
Rolling Stone	3.5/5 stars
Vice (Expert Witness)	A−
XXL	4/5

Culture was met with generally positive reviews. At Metacritic, which assigns a normalized rating out of 100 to reviews from professional publications, the album received an average score of 79, based on 18 reviews. Aggregator AnyDecentMusic? gave it 7.1 out of 10, based on their assessment of the critical consensus.

Neil Z. Yeung of AllMusic praised the album saying, "Culture propels the Migos three into the mainstream with a collection of woozy trap gems that is a peak in their young careers thus far". Writing for Rolling Stone, Christopher R. Weingarten said, "Culture also sees Migos upping their game musically, working with some of Atlanta's hottest producers (Metro Boomin, Zaytoven) to cook up stickier melodies than ever". Clayton Purdom of The A.V. Club said, "On Culture the band stakes a claim as the most important rap group to come out of Atlanta since Outkast. That it even seems fathomable is proof of the album's success". Steve "Flash" Juon of RapReviews said, "Offset has developed into a charismatic storyteller who holds your attention when he keep the stories on wax rather than behind bars". Karas Lamb of Consequence said, "Backed by production from Murda Beatz, Purps, Cardo, Zaytoven and Nard & B, co-pilots Quavo, Offset, and Takeoff sustain the hubris, excess, and immediate gratification adored by fans of gutter rap machismo while somehow bottling the very particular charm necessary for them to capture the hearts of pop-loving teens across the globe and carry rapping children's lit live on the radio". Chris Gibbons of XXL said, "Culture is a tour de force of all that makes Migos great while showcasing all of the group's strengths—the gift for catchy hooks and melodies, unique flows, incredible group chemistry and phenomenal one-liners".

Lewis Lister of Clash said, "CULTURE may be limited in its scope, but it delivers in spades everything one might have hoped for from "the Beatles of this generation". Sofia Rajkumarsingh of The Line of Best Fit said, "Migos never try to recreate anything they've already done, but simply deliver more music that reflects their contagious, unadulterated flow. Culture is an album where they seize a moment of much-deserved success". Winston Cook-Wilson of Spin said, "If you gauge artistic success by innovation, you can just filter the best of Culture, a very decent group of Migos songs, into a playlist. But if you appreciate Migos and the sound they ushered into contemporary rap as being one of the genre's most basic, essential natural resources, it will be easier to let the whole album—a drama of perseverance—ride out". Kitty Empire of The Observer said, "Like their increasingly musical, but still weird, productions, Migos's triplet-heavy, robotic non-flows have come on leaps and bounds, while retaining the group's core starkness".

=== Rankings ===
Select rankings of Culture
Publication	List	Rank	Ref.
Billboard	Billboard's 50 Best Albums of 2017	8	
Clash	Clash Albums of the Year 2017	15	
Complex	The Best Albums of 2017	7	
Exclaim!	Exclaim!'s Top 10 Hip-Hop Albums of 2017	7	
Fact	The 50 Best Albums of 2017	23	
HipHopDX	HipHopDX's Best Rap Albums of 2017	7	
Pitchfork	The 50 Best Albums of 2017	19	
Rolling Stone	50 Best Albums of 2017	9	
Rolling Stone	The 200 Greatest Hip-Hop Albums of All Time	54	
Spin	50 Best Albums of 2017	11	
Stereogum	50 Best Albums of 2017	33	

=== Industry awards ===
Awards and nominations for Culture
Year	Ceremony	Category	Result	Ref.
2018	Grammy Awards	Best Rap Album	Nominated	

== Commercial performance ==
Culture debuted at number one on the US Billboard 200, earning 131,000 album-equivalent units in its first week (44,000 of which were pure album sales). It also topped the US Top R&B/Hip-Hop Albums chart, becoming Migos' first number-one album on both charts. As of July 5, 2017, the album has moved 1,002,000 album-equivalent units in the United States. On July 14, 2017, Culture was certified platinum by the Recording Industry Association of America (RIAA) for combined sales, streaming and track-sales equivalent of a million units.

It also debuted at number one on the Canadian Albums Chart with first-week sales of 2,000 copies.

== Track listing ==
Culture track listing
No.	Title	Writer(s)	Producer(s)	Length
1.	"Culture" (featuring DJ Khaled)	Quavious Marshall; Kirshnik Ball; Kiari Cephus; Khaled Khaled; Dwan Avery; Jeffrey LaCroix	DY; Tre Pounds	2:33
2.	"T-Shirt"	Marshall; Ball; Cephus; James Rosser, Jr.; Brandon Rackley; Trevon Campbell	Nard & B; XL Eagle	4:02
3.	"Call Casting"	Marshall; Ball; Cephus; Tyron Douglas; Rubin Sanders	Buddah Bless; Bron Bron	3:52
4.	"Bad and Boujee" (featuring Lil Uzi Vert)	Marshall; Cephus; Symere Woods; Robert Mandell; Leland Wayne	Metro Boomin; G Koop	5:43
5.	"Get Right Witcha"	Marshall; Ball; Cephus; Shane Lindstrom; Xavier Dotson	Murda Beatz; Zaytoven^{[a]}	4:17
6.	"Slippery" (featuring Gucci Mane)	Marshall; Ball; Cephus; Radric Davis; Grant Decouto; Joshua Parker	Deko; OG Parker	5:04
7.	"Big on Big"	Marshall; Ball; Cephus; Dotson	Zaytoven	4:50
8.	"What the Price"	Marshall; Ball; Cephus; Ricky Harrell; Keanu Torres; William Gaskins	Ricky Racks; Keanu Beats; 808Godz	4:08
9.	"Brown Paper Bag"	Marshall; Ball; Cephus; Dotson	Zaytoven	3:31
10.	"Deadz" (featuring 2 Chainz)	Marshall; Ball; Cephus; Tauheed Epps; Ronald LaTour	Cardo	4:34
11.	"All Ass"	Marshall; Ball; Cephus; Nathaniel Caserta	Purps	4:54
12.	"Kelly Price" (featuring Travis Scott)	Marshall; Ball; Cephus; Jacques Webster II; Courtney Elkins; Jared Jackson	Cash Clay Beats; Deraj Global	6:03
13.	"Out Yo Way"	Marshall; Ball; Cephus; Caserta; Joshua Cross	Purps; Cassius Jay	4:48
Total length:				58:25

Notes

- ^{^[a]} signifies an additional producer

== Personnel ==
Credits adapted from the album's liner notes.

Performers

- Migos – primary artist
- DJ Khaled – featured artist (track 1)
- Lil Uzi Vert – featured artist (track 4)
- Gucci Mane – featured artist (track 6)
- 2 Chainz – featured artist (track 10)
- Travis Scott – featured artist (track 12)

Technical

- Colin Leonard – mastering engineer
- Larry Anthony – mastering engineer
- Daryl McPherson – mixing engineer
- Michael Dottin – mixing engineer
- Quavious Marshall – mixing engineer

Production

- DY – producer (track 1)
- Tre Pounds – producer (track 1)
- Nard & B – producer (track 2)
- XL Eagle – producer (track 2)
- Buddah Bless – producer (track 3)
- Bron Bron – producer (track 3)
- Metro Boomin – producer (track 4)
- G Koop – producer (track 4)
- Murda Beatz – producer (track 5)
- Zaytoven – additional producer (track 5), producer (tracks 7, 9)
- Deko – producer (track 6)
- OG Parker – producer (track 6)
- Ricky Racks – producer (track 8)
- Keanu Beats – producer (track 8)
- 808Godz – producer (track 8)
- Cardo – producer (track 10)
- Purps – producer (tracks 11, 13)
- Cash Clay Beats – producer (track 12)
- Deraj Global – producer (track 12)
- Cassius Jay – producer (track 13)

Additional personnel

- Stole Stojmenov – art direction and design
- Nick Steinhardt – package design
- Alex McDonell – photography

== Charts ==
=== Weekly charts ===
Chart performance for Culture
Chart (2017)	Peak position
Australian Albums (ARIA)	26
Australian Urban Albums (ARIA)	2
Belgian Albums (Ultratop Flanders)	67
Belgian Albums (Ultratop Wallonia)	92
Canadian Albums (Billboard)	1
Czech Albums (ČNS IFPI)	58
Danish Albums (Hitlisten)	23
Dutch Albums (Album Top 100)	9
Finnish Albums (Suomen virallinen lista)	6
French Albums (SNEP)	44
German Albums (Offizielle Top 100)	63
Latvian Albums (LaIPA)	39
New Zealand Albums (RMNZ)	20
Norwegian Albums (VG-lista)	13
Slovak Albums (ČNS IFPI)	84
Swedish Albums (Sverigetopplistan)	18
Swiss Albums (Schweizer Hitparade)	22
UK Albums (Official Charts)	16
UK R&B Albums (Official Charts)	6
US Billboard 200	1
US Top R&B/Hip-Hop Albums (Billboard)	1

=== Year-end charts ===
2017 year-end chart performance for Culture
Chart (2017)	Position
Canadian Albums (Billboard)	13
Danish Albums (Hitlisten)	60
Dutch Albums (MegaCharts)	81
Icelandic Albums (Plötutíóindi)	20
New Zealand Albums (RMNZ)	46
Swedish Albums (Sverigetopplistan)	78
US Billboard 200	8
US Top R&B/Hip-Hop Albums (Billboard)	6

2018 year-end chart performance for Culture
Chart (2018)	Position
US Billboard 200	66
US Top R&B/Hip-Hop Albums (Billboard)	44

=== Decade-end charts ===
Decade-end chart performance for Culture
Chart (2010–2019)	Position
US Billboard 200	83

== Certifications ==
Certifications for Culture
Region	Certification	Certified units/sales
Denmark (IFPI Danmark)	Platinum	20,000^{‡}
France (SNEP)	Gold	50,000^{‡}
United Kingdom (BPI)	Gold	100,000^{‡}
United States (RIAA)	Platinum	1,000,000^{‡}
^{‡} Sales+streaming figures based on certification alone.

== Release history ==
Release dates and formats for Culture
Region	Date	Label(s)	Format(s)	Ref.
United States	January 27, 2017	Quality Control; YRN; 300	Digital download	
