= Daps (director) =

- Born: Oladapo Fagbenle; 12 February 1986 (age 40); Lagos, Nigeria
- Origin: London, England
- Occupation: cinematographer
- Website: dapsofficial.com

Oladapo Fagbenle (born 12 February 1986), professionally known as Daps, is a Nigerian-born British artist, video director, and former NCAA athlete. He is best known for directing music videos for recording artists such as Migos, Stormzy, Iggy Azalea, Kendrick Lamar, Willie xo, Wizkid, 2 Chainz, and Davido.

== Career ==
Born to Nigerian parents, Daps begun his career within the media industry as a video producer in New York and London. Before this, he played collegiate basketball at Campbell University and Bellarmine University. Daps is also the brother of British actor, O-T Fagbenle, video producer, Luti Fagbenle, and basketball player Temi Fagbenle. Daps currently resides in Los Angeles, California.

=== Basketball ===
Daps began playing basketball in London, England, where he played for the Westminster Warriors. He then continued his athletic career in the United States where he attended The Master's School in Connecticut for one year. Daps received a scholarship to play basketball at Campbell University in North Carolina where he competed for two years and received his bachelor's degree. Daps then transferred to Bellarmine University where he played basketball for two more years and received his master's degree. Daps is also the older brother of WNBA Golden State Valkyries Centre Temi Fagbenle.

=== Entertainment career ===
Daps began his video production career in the fall of 2010 and began directing music videos in 2013. In 2016 he directed the video for "Bad and Boujee" for the Migos which went on to become a US number 1 and generated hundreds of millions of views. The video for the Daps-directed, critically acclaimed "T-Shirt" was released.

== Music videography ==
Artist(s)	Song Title	Label	Director	Production Company
Iggy Azalea	"Black Widow" (featuring Rita Ora)	Virgin EMI	Director X / Daps (B-Unit Director)	Luti Media
Jordin Sparks	"Double Tap" (featuring 2 Chainz)	Louder Than Life/Sony Music	Daps	Luti Media
Dappy	"Beautiful Me"	All Around The World	Daps	Luti Media
Kendrick Lamar	"King Kunta"	Top Dawg/Interscope	Director X / Daps (B-Unit Director)	
Cris Cab	"Bada Bing"	Island	Daps	Luti Media
Iggy Azalea	"Team"	Def Jam	Fabien Montique & Daps	Luti Media
Niykee Heaton	"Bad Intentions" (featuring Migos)	Capitol	Daps	Luti Media
Migos	"Cocoon"	Quality Control/300 Ent.	Daps	Luti Media/Creative Row
Quavo & Nicki Minaj	"She For Keeps"	Quality Control	Daps & Quavo	
Sneakbo	"Right Here" (featuring Nyla)	Universal	Daps	Luti Media
The Shires	"My Universe"	Universal	Daps	Luti Media
Migos	"Bad & Boujee" (featuring Lil Uzi Vert)	Quality Control/300 Ent.	Daps	Creative Row
Migos	"T-Shirt"	Quality Control/300 Ent.	Daps	Creative Row
Stormzy	"Big for Your Boots"	Merky	Daps	Mastermind Productions/Creative Row
Migos	"Deadz" (featuring 2 Chainz)	Quality Control/300 Ent.	Daps	Creative Row
Wizkid	"Come Closer" (featuring Drake)	RCA/Sony Music	Daps	Creative Row
Young Thug	"All the Time"	300 Ent.	Daps	Creative Row
Sean Paul	"Body" (featuring Migos)	Universal	Daps	Luti Media/Creative Row
Migos	"Slippery" (featuring Gucci Mane)	Quality Control/300 Ent	Daps	Creative Row
Ayo & Teo	"Rolex"	Columbia	Daps	Luti Media
Lil Yachty	"Dirty Mouth"	Quality Control/Motown/Capitol	Daps	
Willie XO	"Kraze "	SBMG	Daps	
Davido	"Fall"	DMW/Sony Music	Daps	Luti Media/Creative Row
Rich the Kid	"Plug Walk"	Rich Forever Music/Interscope	Daps	
City Girls	"Where the Bag Ag"	Quality Control	Daps	
Davido	"Like Dat"	DMW/Sony Music	Daps	Creative Row
DJ Snake	"Enzo"	Universal	Daps	
2 Chainz	"Blue Cheese" (featuring Migos)	Def Jam	Daps	
City Girls	"Twerk" (featuring Cardi B)	Quality Control/Motown/Capitol	Daps & Sara Lacombe	
Lil Baby	"Close Friends"	Quality Control	Daps	
Lil Uzi Vert	"Sanguine Paradise"	Warner/Atlantic	Daps & Lil Uzi Vert	
Saweetie	"My Type"	Warner/Artistry	Daps	
DaBaby & Lil Baby	"Baby"	Quality Control	Daps	
City Girls	"Jobs"	Quality Control/Motown	Daps	
