= One Time (Migos song) =

Single by Migos

Single by Migos

from the album Yung Rich Nation
- Released: February 10, 2015
- Recorded: 2015
- Genre: Trap
- Length: 4:41
- Label: Quality Control; 300; Atlantic
- Songwriters: Quavious Marshall; Kirsnick Ball; Kiari Cephus; Grant Decouto
- Producer: Deko

Migos singles chronology
"Handsome and Wealthy" (2014)	"One Time" (2015)	"Pipe It Up" (2015)

Music video
- "One Time" on YouTube

"One Time" is a song by American hip hop group Migos. It premiered on February 5, 2015, and was released for digital download on February 10, 2015 by Quality Control Music, 300 Entertainment and Atlantic Records. The song was produced by Deko.

== Composition ==
The song features a "wavy" and "simple, bass heavy" beat, as well as ad-libs throughout the song. In the hook, Quavo lists off things that only take one time for Migos to influence pop culture or accomplish.

== Music video ==
A music video for the song, directed by Ninian Doff, was released on March 23, 2015. It finds Migos waking up and recovering from a wild party, with flashbacks of the party shown. The video features cameos from actor Blake Anderson and football player DeSean Jackson.

== Charts ==
Chart (2015)	Peak position
US Bubbling Under Hot 100 (Billboard)	7
US Hot R&B/Hip-Hop Songs (Billboard)	34
