= Get Right Witcha =

2017 song by Migos

Song by Migos

from the album Culture
- Released: January 27, 2017
- Genre: Hip hop; trap
- Length: 4:17
- Label: Quality Control; 300
- Songwriters: Quavious Marshall; Kirsnick Ball; Kiari Cephus; Shane Lindstrom; Xavier Dotson
- Producers: Murda Beatz; Zaytoven

Music video
- "Get Right Witcha" on YouTube

"Get Right Witcha" is a song by the American hip hop group Migos from their second studio album Culture (2017). It was produced by Murda Beatz and Zaytoven.

== Composition ==
The song features a flute-based instrumental and describes Migos' extravagant and busy lifestyle.

== Critical reception ==
In a Complex review of Culture, the song was lauded: "On 'Get Right Witcha', you go from infectious Quavo hook to fire Quavo verse to insane Offset verse and finish with Takeoff spazzing. The song never lets up the momentum, and the energy between all three Migos is palpable."

== Music video ==
The music video for the song, directed by King Content, was released on April 5, 2017. Filmed at Sunset Ranch Hollywood, the video features the members of Migos in expensive cars, wearing jewelry, flaunting stacks of money, and riding horses. The video also includes "lingerie-clad women" dancing.

== Charts ==
Chart (2017)	Peak position
Canada Hot 100 (Billboard)	63
US Billboard Hot 100	72
US Hot R&B/Hip-Hop Songs (Billboard)	29

== Certifications ==
Region	Certification	Certified units/sales
New Zealand (RMNZ)	Gold	15,000^{‡}
United States (RIAA)	Gold	500,000^{‡}
^{‡} Sales+streaming figures based on certification alone.
