= Deadz =

2017 song by Migos featuring 2 Chainz

Song by Migos featuring 2 Chainz

from the album Culture
- Released: January 27, 2017
- Length: 4:34
- Label: Quality Control; YRN; 300
- Songwriters: Quavious Marshall; Kirshnik Ball; Kiari Cephus; Tauheed Epps; Ronald LaTour
- Producer: Cardo

Music video
- "Deadz" on YouTube

"Deadz" is a song by American hip hop group Migos from their second studio album Culture (2017). It features American rapper 2 Chainz and was produced by Cardo.

== Composition ==
The song uses a horn-blaring instrumental and centers on the rappers counting their money.

== Critical reception ==
The song was met with generally positive reviews from critics. Rolling Stone's Christopher R. Weingarten commented that the song "puts 'ah ooh!' exultations into a Game of Thrones gladiator march". Clayton Purdom of The A.V. Club wrote "Even when the trio goes big, as on the ominous 'Deadz,' they still find room for dynamics, climaxing in a syncopated Takeoff verse backed by warped '80s horror synths." Paul A. Thompson of Pitchfork deemed it as one of the "fascinating reconciliations" from Culture, writing that it "seems to find a middle ground between the sparse Atlanta sounds and Chicago's maximalism that were warring around the time of Y.R.N." Karas Lamb of Consequence commented that the use of Auto-Tune "works for" the song. Chris Gibbons of XXL praised Quavo's line boasting that his money is "long like anacondas" and considered 2 Chainz's feature the best guest appearance on Culture, writing, "Even though his feature is also very short, he makes the most of it and showcases fantastic chemistry with Migos" and "2 Chainz has so much charisma that he barely needs to say anything else to make a lasting impression."

== Music video ==
The music video was released on February 23, 2017. Directed by Daps and Migos, it opens with an orchestra performing the instrumental of the song in front of a mansion. Quavo then appears rapping in a chandelier-filled hallway and behind a piano. A group of pallbearers wearing diamond-studded masks appear in the clip. Wearing diamond jewelry, the Migos members count stacks of money near the coffins of George Washington, Abraham Lincoln and Benjamin Franklin in a mortuary, throwing some on them, and are also seen with 2 Chainz rapping from a balcony overlooking the orchestra. Migos resurrects the historical figures by tossing money into their caskets.

== Charts ==
Chart (2017)	Peak position
US Bubbling Under Hot 100 (Billboard)	5
US Hot R&B/Hip-Hop Songs (Billboard)	45
