= Stir Fry (song) =

Single by Migos

from the album Culture II
- Released: December 20, 2017
- Recorded: 2017
- Genre: Hip-hop; trap
- Length: 3:10
- Label: Quality Control; Capitol; Motown
- Songwriters: Quavious Marshall; Kiari Cephus; Kirsnick Ball; Pharrell Williams; Harry Palmer
- Producer: Pharrell Williams

Migos singles chronology
"MotorSport" (2017)	"Stir Fry" (2017)	"Walk It Talk It" (2018)

Music video
- "Stir Fry" on YouTube

"Stir Fry" is a song by American hip-hop group Migos. It was released on December 20, 2017, as the second single from Migos' third studio album Culture II (2018). Written alongside producer Pharrell Williams, it peaked at number eight on the Billboard Hot 100.

== Background and composition ==
"Stir Fry" differs from Migos' traditional Atlanta-style trap sound. In an interview with Beats 1's Ebro Darden, the group revealed the instrumental for the song was originally intended for an unreleased T.I. song in 2008. Quavo stated that "Pharrell said that he was waiting for this moment."

The song was used for the 2018 NBA All-Star Weekend.

== Critical reception ==
Pitchfork gave the song a positive review saying that, "The song's interlocking polyrhythms—bongos, cricket-like whistles, clicking trap hi-hats, and slowed-down snares sampled from the Mohawks' "Champ"—are a beauty to behold. It's a disorienting maze of sounds, a beat that's difficult to wrap your head around, let alone rap over."

== Music video ==
The music video was released on January 28, 2018. Directed by Sing Lee and Quavo, the video features the trio dressed in silk brocade suits gambling in a Chinese restaurant with Pharrell Williams and Nigo. At the end of the video, the trio clash with an opposing gang.

Migos also created a cooking themed music video with BuzzFeed Tasty depicting the trio making a stir fry dish.

== Personnel ==
Credits adapted from Tidal.

- Pharrell Williams – production
- Colin Leonard – master engineering
- DJ Durel – engineering
- Mike Larson – engineering
- Thomas Cullison – engineering
- Thomas "Tillie" Mann – mixing
- Leslie Brathwaite – mixing

== Charts ==
=== Weekly charts ===
Chart (2017–2018)	Peak position
Australia (ARIA)	24
Belgium (Ultratip Bubbling Under Flanders)	8
Canada Hot 100 (Billboard)	19
Czech Republic Singles Digital (ČNS IFPI)	77
France (SNEP)	159
Hungary (Stream Top 40)	35
Ireland (IRMA)	45
Netherlands (Single Top 100)	77
New Zealand (Recorded Music NZ)	18
Portugal (AFP)	62
Slovakia Singles Digital (ČNS IFPI)	53
Sweden (Sverigetopplistan)	63
Switzerland (Schweizer Hitparade)	79
UK Singles (Official Charts)	51
US Billboard Hot 100	8
US Hot R&B/Hip-Hop Songs (Billboard)	5
US Pop Airplay (Billboard)	35
US Rhythmic Airplay (Billboard)	4

=== Year-end charts ===
Chart (2018)	Position
Canada (Canadian Hot 100)	75
US Billboard Hot 100	48
US Hot R&B/Hip-Hop Songs (Billboard)	24
US Rhythmic (Billboard)	26

== Certifications ==
Region	Certification	Certified units/sales
Australia (ARIA)	Platinum	70,000^{‡}
Brazil (Pro-Música Brasil)	Gold	20,000^{‡}
Canada (Music Canada)	Platinum	80,000^{‡}
Denmark (IFPI Danmark)	Gold	45,000^{‡}
New Zealand (RMNZ)	3× Platinum	90,000^{‡}
Portugal (AFP)	Gold	5,000^{‡}
United Kingdom (BPI)	Gold	400,000^{‡}
United States (RIAA)	5× Platinum	5,000,000^{‡}
^{‡} Sales+streaming figures based on certification alone.

== Release history ==
Region	Date	Format	Label	Ref.
Various	December 20, 2017	Digital download	Quality Control Music; Capitol; Motown	
Italy	February 2, 2018	Contemporary hit radio	Universal	
