= Slippery (song) =

2017 single by Migos featuring Gucci Mane

Single by Migos featuring Gucci Mane

from the album Culture
- Released: May 16, 2017
- Recorded: 2016
- Genre: Hip hop; trap
- Length: 5:04 (single version): 5:12 (album version)
- Label: Quality Control; 300
- Songwriters: Quavious Marshall; Kirsnick Ball; Kiari Cephus; Grant Decouto; Joshua Parker; Radric Davis
- Producers: Deko; OG Parker

Migos singles chronology
"Body" (2017)	"Slippery" (2017)	"Too Hotty" (2017)

Gucci Mane singles chronology
"What Happened Last Night" (2017)	"Slippery" (2017)	"Perfect Pint" (2017)

Music video
- "Slippery" on YouTube

"Slippery" is a song by American hip hop group Migos featuring fellow American rapper Gucci Mane. It was sent to radio on May 16, 2017 as the third single from Migos' second studio album Culture (2017). The song was produced by frequent collaborators Deko and OG Parker.

== Commercial performance ==
The song peaked at number 29 on the Billboard Hot 100 on the week of July 22, 2017.

== Music video ==
The music video for the song, directed by Daps and Quavo, premiered May 4, 2017, via Migos' YouTube channel. The music video had 475 million views as of June 2022.

== Charts ==
=== Weekly charts ===
Chart (2017)	Peak position
Canada Hot 100 (Billboard)	46
US Billboard Hot 100	29
US Hot R&B/Hip-Hop Songs (Billboard)	12
US Rhythmic Airplay (Billboard)	22

=== Year-end charts ===
Chart (2017)	Position
US Billboard Hot 100	86
US Hot R&B/Hip-Hop Songs (Billboard)	40

== Certifications ==
Region	Certification	Certified units/sales
Denmark (IFPI Danmark)	Gold	45,000^{‡}
France (SNEP)	Gold	100,000^{‡}
Italy (FIMI)	Gold	25,000^{‡}
New Zealand (RMNZ)	Platinum	30,000^{‡}
Portugal (AFP)	Gold	5,000^{‡}
United Kingdom (BPI)	Silver	200,000^{‡}
United States (RIAA)	Gold	500,000^{‡}
^{‡} Sales+streaming figures based on certification alone.
