= Kelly Price (song) =

Song by Migos featuring Travis Scott

Song by Migos featuring Travis Scott

from the album Culture
- Released: January 27, 2017
- Genre: Trap
- Length: 6:03
- Label: Quality Control; 300
- Songwriters: Quavious Keyate Marshall; Kirshnik Ball; Kiari Kendrell Cephus; Jacques Webster II; Courtney Elkins; Jared Jackson
- Producers: Cash Clay Beats; Deraj Global; !DubMagic!

"Kelly Price" is a song by American hip hop group Migos, released on January 27, 2017, from their second studio album Culture (2017). Featuring American rapper Travis Scott, the song was produced by Cash Clay Beats, Deraj Global and !DubMagic!.

== Composition ==
In the song, Quavo, Takeoff and Travis Scott sing about riding in luxury cars and their lifestyle of spending time with women and taking drugs. XXL described the instrumental as "elegant, slow-moving".

== Critical reception ==
In an otherwise positive review of Culture, Winston Cook-Wilson of Spin wrote, "The album only seems to tire of being serviceable and precise in its final act, slumping into the oddly bloated, Travis-Scott-assisted ballad 'Kelly Price'".

== Charts ==
Chart (2017)	Peak position
Canada Hot 100 (Billboard)	55
New Zealand Heatseekers (RMNZ)	6
US Billboard Hot 100	58
US Hot R&B/Hip-Hop Songs (Billboard)	23
