= Look at My Dab =

Single by Migos

from the album Back to the Bando
- Released: October 30, 2015
- Recorded: 2015
- Genre: Trap
- Length: 3:37
- Label: Quality Control; YRN; 300
- Songwriters: Quavious Marshall; Kirsnick Ball
- Producer: Drumma Boy

Migos singles chronology
"Pipe It Up" (2015)	"Look at My Dab" (2015)	"Woa" (2016)

"Look at My Dab" (originally titled "Bitch Dab") is a song by American hip hop group Migos. It was released as a single on October 30, 2015 by Quality Control Music and 300 Entertainment. The song was included on their mixtape Back to the Bando (2015) and was produced by Drumma Boy. It peaked at number 87 on the US Billboard Hot 100 chart.

== Music videos ==
Migos released two music videos to promote "Look at My Dab". The first video was uploaded to Mass Appeal magazine's YouTube channel on November 12, 2015, while the second one was released on December 19, 2015 via WorldStarHipHop's YouTube channel. In the video American rapper Young Thug makes a cameo appearance.

== Cultural impact ==
The song helped popularize the dab dance, the origins of which have been disputed. Atlanta hip-hop artists frequently mentioned as possible pioneers have included Migos, Skippa da Flippa, Peewee Longway, Soulja Boy and Rich The Kid.

However, the origins of the "dab" actually date back decades, to the "henshin" pose/sequence in Japanese popular culture, where it has commonly appeared in tokusatsu superhero shows such as Kamen Rider and Super Sentai (later adapted into Power Rangers) since the 1970s, as well as anime shows such as Sailor Moon and Dragon Ball Z (e.g. Ginyu Force, Great Saiyaman, fusion dance) since at least the 1990s. The dab also appeared in the Bollywood music video "Maye Ne Maye" from the 1994 Bollywood film Hum Aapke Hain Koun. Whatever its origins, "Look at My Dab" helped popularize the dab in American popular culture, and the dab has since gone viral on social media platforms.

== Charts ==
Chart (2015–16)	Peak position
US Billboard Hot 100	87
US Hot R&B/Hip-Hop Songs (Billboard)	28
