= OG Parker =

American record producer

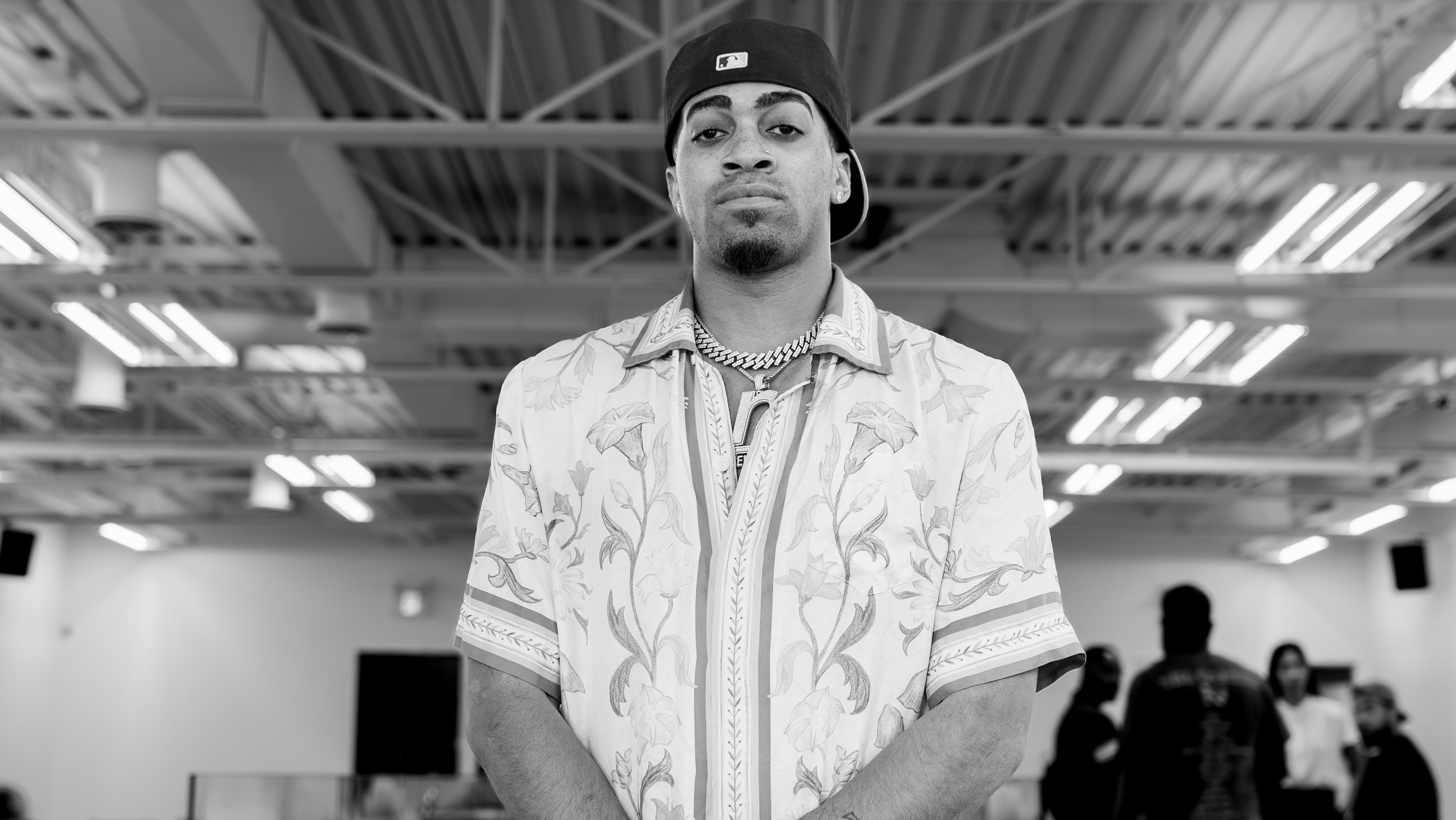
- Parker in 2023

Background information
- Born: Joshua Isaih Parker; October 27, 1993 (age 32); Fayetteville, Georgia, U.S.
- Origin: Atlanta, Georgia, U.S.
- Genres: Hip hop; trap; R&B
- Occupations: Record producer; songwriter
- Instruments: FL Studio; Komplete Kontrol S61; keyboard; piano; saxophone; clarinet; percussion
- Years active: 2013–present
- Labels: Quality Control Music; Neutral Records

Joshua Isaih "'OG" Parker (born October 27, 1993), is an American hip hop record producer from Atlanta, Georgia. In 2015, he worked as an in-house producer for the record label Quality Control Music. His stage moniker is adapted from his early affiliation with OG Maco's collective OGG, where he became acquainted with frequent collaborator Deko. Parker has since produced for prominent artists including Tory Lanez, Migos, Drake, PartyNextDoor, Chris Brown, Jacquees, Gucci Mane, Fetty Wap, K Camp, and YFN Lucci.

== Early life and career ==
Parker was born and raised in Fayetteville, Georgia.

He attended Georgia State University from 2012 to 2014 and studied music and graphic arts. While in school he began creating remixes of popular songs and producing beats using FL Studio. In 2015, Parker dropped out to focus on his music professionally. He joined OG Maco's collective OGG, where he adapted his moniker.

Parker has produced for artists including Chris Brown, Migos, Katy Perry, DJ Carnage, and Lil Yachty, among others. In 2016, he produced seven tracks on YFN Lucci's critically acclaimed project Wish Me Well 2.

In 2020, Parker was enlisted by Red Bull to host their syndicated show The Cut USA, a show pairing 9 singer-songwriters and 9 music producers to create new tracks in Red Bull Studios.

In 2021, Parker launched NEUTRAL RECORDS, a record label, management group and publishing company. His signees include R&B singer Imani, along with producers Beezo, XY, and Kilo Keys. The same year, Parker and YouTuber DDG released the collaborative album DIE 4 RESPECT, where Parker produced all tracks and enlisted guest appearances from Coi Leray, Lil Yachty, and YoungBoy Never Broke Again.

In 2022, Parker was awarded a Grammy Award for Album of the Year for his production work on Jazmine Sullivan's song "On It" from her album Heaux Tales (2021). Parker has also garnered 6 other nominations throughout his career.

== Filmography ==
2018 Superfly as Darryl Pastore

== Production discography ==
=== Charted songs ===
Title	Year	Peak''chart positions					Album
Title	Year	US	US R&B/HH	AUS	CAN	UK	Album
"Slippery" (Migos featuring Gucci Mane)	2017	29	12	—	46	—	Culture
"Pills & Automobiles" (Chris Brown featuring Yo Gotti, A Boogie wit da Hoodie, and Kodak Black)	2017	46	16	—	67	—	Heartbreak on a Full Moon
"B.I.D" (Tory Lanez)	2018	—	—	—	46	85	Memories Don't Die
"Walk It Talk It" (Migos featuring Drake)	2018	10	7	55	14	31	Culture II
"Loyal" (PartyNextDoor featuring Drake)	2019	60	29	82	19	31	Partymobile
"Restroom Occupied" (Yella Beezy featuring Chris Brown)	2019	109	101	—	—	—	Baccend Beezy
"Thot Shit" (Megan Thee Stallion)	2021	16	6	38	43	27	Something for Thee Hotties

=== RIAA Certifications ===
Track	Year	Certification	Album	Co-Producers
“1Hunnid” (K Camp)	2015	Platinum	Only Way Is Up	Deko
“Slippery” (Migos featuring Gucci Mane)	2017	4× Platinum	Culture	Deko
“Pills & Automobiles” (Chris Brown featuring Yo Gotti, A Boogie wit da Hoodie, and Kodak Black)	2017	3× Platinum	Heartbreak On A Full Moon	Smash David, the Martianz
“B.I.D.” (Tory Lanez)	2018	Gold	Memories Don't Die	Smash David
“Walk It Talk It” (Migos featuring Drake)	2018	6× Platinum	Culture II	Deko
“Loyal” (PartyNextDoor ft Drake)	2019	Platinum	PARTYMOBILE	DreGotJuice, OG Parker& 40
“Just Might” (Summer Walker featuring PartyNextDoor)	2019	Platinum	Over It	Arsenio Archer, G. Ry & OG Parker
“Indigo” (Chris Brown)	2019	Gold	Indigo	Romano, Soundz, Scott Storch
“Stuntin' On You” (Tyla Yaweh featuring DaBaby)	2020	Gold		Hitmaka, Chrishan
“Man in the Mirror” (A Boogie Wit da Hoodie)	2021	Gold	B4 AVA	Smash David, S.Dot, Dez Wright, DiorWinterr
“On It” (Jazmine Sullivan featuring Ari Lennox)	2021	Gold	Heaux Tales	WU10, Cardiak
“Hood Melody” (DDG & OG Parker featuring YoungBoy Never Broke Again)	2021	Gold	DIE 4 RESPECT	LondnBlue, Kazi Medina, Smash David & Jon Milli
"Thot Shit” (Megan Thee Stallion)	2021	2× Platinum	Something for Thee Hotties	Shawn “Source” Jarrett, OG Parker & LilJuMadeDaBeat
“Baddest" (Yung Bleu featuring Chris Brown & 2 Chainz)	2021	Gold	Moon Boy	Hitmaka, OG Parker, Romano & Mike Woods
"Vette Motors” (NBA Youngboy)	2022	Gold	The Last Slimeto	OG Parker, jetsonmade, Beezo, liltyh & Jason Goldberg
"Sweetest Pie” (Megan Thee Stallion featuring Dua Lipa)	2022	Platinum	Traumazine	Romano, Platinum Libraries & KOZ

== Production credits ==
Track	Year	Artist(s)	Album	Co-Producers
"Restroom Occupied"	2019	Yella Beezy ft Chris Brown	Baccend Beezy	
"Baguettey"	2019	Yella Beezy ft Trapboy Freddy	Baccend Beezy	Romano
"Trust"	2019	Yella Beezy	Baccend Beezy	Smash David
"Run Back"	2019	Always Never	Where Now (EP)	G.Ry, Romano, BRYVN
"Hands Off"	2019	Gucci Mane ft Jeremih	Delusions of Grandeur	
"Natural Disaster"	2019	Chris Brown	Indigo	Romano, Smash David
"Burgundy"	2019	Chris Brown	Indigo	Romano
"Indigo"	2019	Chris Brown	Indigo	Scott Storch, Romano, Soundz
"Choosin"	2019	PnB Rock	TrapStar Turnt PopStar	Romano, G Ry, 1Mind
"Type a Way"	2019	Eric Bellinger ft Chris Brown & OG Parker	The Rebirth 2	Romano
"Showin Out"	2019	Dreezy	Big Dreez	Xeryus, Romano
"Love Someone"	2019	Dreezy ft Jacquees	Big Dreez	Romano, Xeryus
"Control"	2019	August Alsina ft Ty Dolla Sign	Forever and a Day	Xeryus, Romano
"Us"	2019	August Alsina	Forever and a Day	Romano
"Go"		August Alsina	Forever and a Day	Romano, Pearl Lion
"Bipolar"	2018	Gucci Mane ft Quavo	Evil Genius	Deko & Smash David
"Cat Piss"	2018	Ski Mask the Slump God ft Lil Yachty	Stokeley	Deko & Romano
"Did for the Streets"	2018	Lil Durk	Signed to the Streets 3	1Mind, Romano, CVRE
"Perfect Timing"	2018	MihTY, Jeremih & Ty Dolla $ign	MIH-TY	Romano, Keyboard Kid, HItmaka
"FlEXiBle"	2018	Tory Lanez ft Lil Baby & Chris Brown	Love Me Now?	Romano, Smash David
"Still"	2018	Kollision	Better Than Yesterday	
"How Bout That"	2018	Quavo	Quavo Huncho	Romano
"Walk With A Limp"	2018	Mozzy ft YFN Lucci	Gangland Landlord	Dre Got The Juice, Goldenchyld, Budda Beats
"No Validation"	2018	Jacquees	4275	
"Whatever You Into"	2018	Jacquees	4275	
"Mamacita"	2018	BlocBoy JB	Simi	Deko, Romano
"LA Nights"	2018	Ne-Yo	Good Man	G Ry, Romano
"Trouble In The City"	2018	merge!	Non-album single	Deko, Romano
"Street Punk"	2018	Hoodrich Pablo Juan ft Lil Yachty	Rich Hood	G Ry
"Big Tymers"	2018	Lil Baby and Marlo	2 The Hard Way	
"Waterworld"	2018	Carnage ft Migos	Battered Bruised & Bloody	Carnage
"Walk It Talk It"	2018	Migos ft Drake	Culture II	Deko
"B.I.D."	2018	Tory Lanez	Memories Don't Die	Smash David
"Slippery"	2017	Migos ft Gucci Mane	Culture	Deko
"Enormous"	2017	Gucci Mane ft Ty Dolla Sign	Mr. Davis	TM88, Rex Kudo
"Liger"	2017	Carnage ft Young Thug	Young Martha	Carnage
"Been Broke Before"	2017	YFN Lucci	Long Live Nut	Romano
"Testimony"	2017	YFN Lucci ft Boosie	Long Live Nut	
"Options"	2017	Lil Baby	Perfect Timing	Beezo Beatz
"Paper Ova Here"	2017	Quavo	Non-album singles	
"Intruder"	2017	Takeoff	Non-album singles	
"Pills and Automobiles"	2017	Chris Brown ft. Yo Gotti, A Boogie wit da Hoodie & Kodak Black	Heartbreak on a Full Moon	Smash David, the Martianz
"Sensei"	2017	Chris Brown ft. A1	Heartbreak on a Full Moon	Deko
"1Hunnid"	2016	K Camp ft Fetty Wap	Only Way Is Up	Deko
"Everytime"	2016	YFN Lucci ft Johnny Cinco	Wish Me Well 2	
"Artificial"	2016	YFN Lucci	Wish Me Well 2	
"Like We Never"	2016	YFN Lucci	Wish Me Well 2	Goldenchyld, Dre Got Juice, King Wade
"Who I Do It For"	2016	YFN Lucci	Wish Me Well 2	Goldenchyld
"Talk That Shit"	2016	YFN Lucci	Wish Me Well 2	Goldenchyld
