= Pipe It Up =

Single by Migos

Single by Migos

from the album Yung Rich Nation
- Released: July 7, 2015
- Length: 3:26
- Label: YRN; Quality Control; 300
- Songwriters: Quavious Marshall; Kirsnick Ball; Shane Lindstrom
- Producer: Murda Beatz

Migos singles chronology
"One Time" (2015)	"Pipe It Up" (2015)	"Can't Believe" (2015)

Music video
- "Pipe It Up" on YouTube

"Pipe It Up" is a song by American hip hop group Migos. It was released on July 7, 2015, as the second single from their debut studio album Yung Rich Nation (2015). The song was produced by Murda Beatz.

== Background and composition ==
Caitlin White of Stereogum described the song as "built off an impossibly fast Migos-flow trademarked hook, burbling synthesizers, and a clean, crisp little piano tinkle". Migos uses the phrase "pipe it up" as a response to different situations. The rap in a triplet rhythm pattern. In the song, they also declare they invented the phrase "pipe it up" and predict it will become popular.

== Music video ==
The music video was released on August 3, 2015. It sees Quavo and Takeoff performing, with people from a neighborhood, including kids, who show dancing moves. Offset does not appear in the video.

== Remix ==
The official remix of the song features American rappers 2 Chainz and Jeezy. Trevor Smith of HotNewHipHop praised 2 Chainz's verse, describing that he is a perfect fit for the "bouncy" instrumental, "coming through with some of his most hilariously inventive punchlines in a minute".

== Charts ==
Chart (2015–16)	Peak position
US Bubbling Under Hot 100 (Billboard)	6
US Hot R&B/Hip-Hop Songs (Billboard)	38
