= 3 Way (EP) =

EP by Migos
- Released: July 7, 2016
- Recorded: 2016
- Genres: Hip hop; trap
- Length: 20:26
- Labels: Quality Control; YRN
- Producers: Zaytoven; Cassius Jay; Dun Deal; Ricky Racks

Migos chronology
| Yung Rich Nation (2015) | 3 Way (2016) | Culture (2017) |

Singles from 3 Way (EP)
- 1. "3 Way (Intro)" Released: July 28, 2016; 2. "Slide On Em" Released: August 25, 2016

Professional ratings
Review scores
| Source | Rating |
|---|---|
| HipHopDX | 3.7/5 stars |
| Pitchfork | 6.5/10 stars |

3 Way is the second and final extended play (EP) by American hip hop group Migos. It was released on July 7, 2016, by Quality Control Music and YRN tha Label. The EP features a single guest appearance from Blac Youngsta. The EPs production is handled by Zaytoven, Cassius Jay, Dun Deal and Ricky Racks, creative director Worldstarpromo.

== Critical reception ==
3 Way received generally positive reviews. Kathy Iaondoli from Pitchfork gave 3 Way a score of 6.5 out of 10 and wrote:

Sonically, 3-Way is very much an extension of Migos’ Y.R.N. 2 mixtape from earlier this year, but their content is seemingly drifting into new directions. With the upcoming election, racial injustice, and police brutality, many artists have changed the subject of their tune. Perhaps the country’s current climate inspired Migos to delve deeper this time, or perhaps they were this deep all along and we just weren't listening.

Site HipHopDX.com gave it 3.5 of 5.

== Track listing ==
All tracks are written by Quavious Marshall, Kirsnick Ball and Kiari Cephus.

| No. | Title | Producer(s) | Length |
|---|---|---|---|
| 1. | "3 Way (Intro)" | Zaytoven | 3:44 |
| 2. | "Savages Only" | Cassius Jay | 5:05 |
| 3. | "Coppers And Robbers" | Zaytoven | 3:55 |
| 4. | "Can't Go Out Sad" | Ricky Racks | 4:33 |
| 5. | "Slide On Em" (featuring Blac Youngsta) | Dun Deal | 3:30 |
| Total length: | | | 20:26 |
