= Call Casting =

Promotional single by Migos

Promotional single by Migos

from the album Culture
- Released: January 13, 2017
- Length: 3:52
- Label: Quality Control; YRN; 300
- Songwriters: Quavious Marshall; Kirshnik Ball; Kiari Cephus; Tyron Douglas; Rubin Sanders
- Producers: Buddah Bless; Bron Bron

Music video
- "Call Casting" on YouTube

"Call Casting" is a song by American hip hop group Migos, first released as a music video on January 4, 2017. It was later released to streaming services on January 13, 2017, as the first promotional single from their second studio album Culture (2017). It was produced by Buddah Bless and Bron Bron.

== Music video ==
In December 2016, Migos traveled to Lagos, Nigeria for a performance. While there, they also filmed the music video for "Call Casting". Directed by Keemotion, it sees the trio hanging out in shantytowns and near soccer stadiums, while also smoking and sipping from Styrofoam cups. The clip is interspersed with shots of local people, wildlife (specifically giraffes and zebras), and a traffic jam.

== Critical reception ==
The song was generally well received by music critics. Christopher R. Weingarten of Rolling Stone wrote favorably of its melody, describing it as a "menacing-yet-fun calliope swirl". Karas Lamb of Consequence called it "a classic A-Town stomp." Chris Schulz of The New Zealand Herald wrote, "Try the horn blasts and piano riffs of Call Casting, in which Migos repeat short stabs of words so often they'll soon be imprinted into your brain." Kenan Draughorne of Los Angeles Times praised Takeoff for his "stomping chorus over the church organs" of the song.

== Charts ==
Chart (2017)	Peak position
Canada Hot 100 (Billboard)	65
US Billboard Hot 100	62
US Hot R&B/Hip-Hop Songs (Billboard)	25
