= Bad and Boujee =

2016 single by Migos featuring Lil Uzi Vert

Single by Migos featuring Lil Uzi Vert

from the album Culture
- Released: October 28, 2016
- Recorded: 2016
- Studio: Mally Mall's White House
- Genre: Hip hop; trap
- Length: 5:34 (single and video version); 5:43 (album version); 3:27 (radio edit)
- Label: Quality Control; 300; Atlantic
- Songwriters: Quavious Marshall; Kiari Cephus; Symere Woods; Leland Wayne; Robert Mandell
- Producers: Metro Boomin; G Koop

Migos singles chronology
"Cocoon" (2016)	"Bad and Boujee" (2016)	"T-Shirt" (2017)

Lil Uzi Vert singles chronology
"Too Much Sauce" (2016)	"Bad and Boujee" (2016)	"Go Off" (2017)

Music video
- "Bad and Boujee" on YouTube

"Bad and Boujee" is a song by American hip-hop group Migos featuring American rapper Lil Uzi Vert. Written alongside producer Metro Boomin and co-producer G Koop, it was originally released to the Quality Control Music YouTube channel on August 27, 2016 before being officially released on October 28 by Quality Control Music, 300 Entertainment, and Atlantic Records as the lead single from the group's second studio album Culture (2017).

In late December 2016, "Bad and Boujee" became an Internet phenomenon, spawning many memes with the lyrics "rain drop, drop top". This viral trend, combined with Donald Glover's shoutout at the 2017 Golden Globes, would help its commercial performance and cause the song to spike into the top ten and later peak at number one on the US Billboard Hot 100 for the week of January 21, 2017, making it the first number one single for both Migos and Lil Uzi Vert. There were also many memes about member Takeoff's omission from the song. The single received a nomination for Best Rap Performance at the 60th Annual Grammy Awards. The track has acquired over 1 billion Spotify plays as of August 2025.

== Composition ==
The song is written in the key of E♭ minor at a tempo of 127 bpm. The instrumental has been described as a "boom-heavy, moody-keyboard creeper". The verses are performed by Offset, Quavo, and Lil Uzi Vert, who all rap about their lifestyles of using expensive products, drugs, and being with women. Ad-libs are also heard throughout the song.

== Critical reception ==
Complex placed it at number 24 on its The 50 Best Songs of 2016 list, saying; "The track is lurching and confident, the kind of song that's sure of its own appeal but knows not to step outside of the pocket. It seems like an unlikely hit, but try listening just once". Pigeons & Planes ranked it at number 43 on their Best Songs of 2016 list, saying that the "track is really all about Offset". The Fader ranked the song at number 25 on its The 115 Best Songs of 2016 list. Fact named it as one of the 20 best rap and R&B tracks of 2016. Vulture favorably compared "Bad and Boujee" to James Brown's song "Super Bad". In 2021, it was ranked No. 451 on Rolling Stone's "500 Greatest Songs of All Time".

== Chart performance ==
The song reached number one on the Billboard Hot 100, making it the first chart-topping single for both Migos and Lil Uzi Vert. A week after its peak, it was dethroned by Ed Sheeran's "Shape of You", but retrieved its peak position the following week and stood there for two more weeks before being replaced by "Shape of You" again. It remained in the top ten of the chart for 14 consecutive weeks and was later ranked as the sixth biggest song of 2017.

"Bad and Boujee" has also peaked at number five in Canada, making it Migos and Lil Uzi Vert's first charted single in that country. As of June 20, 2017, the song has sold 4,000,000 units in the United States. The song was certified 4× Platinum by the Recording Industry Association of America (RIAA).

== Music video ==
The Daps-directed music video for "Bad and Boujee" premiered via Migos' YouTube channel on October 31, 2016. It features cameo appearances from rappers Travis Scott and OG Maco.

In an interview with Kiss FM Kenya, director Daps revealed the inspiration behind the concept of the viral music video: "The concept came about from the title really. 'Bad' is good looking so we needed pretty ladies and 'boujee' is stuck up so we needed them to play that part. I like having juxtapositions in my videos as it makes the art stand out. The contrast between these ladies dressed in high fashion but having them in regular environments grasped me. Then it was about adding in little elements after that — the doves, the noodles, Ace of Spades, silk shirts on a dirt bike." Rapper & Social Media Celebrity, Rubi Rose, also made her debut appearance as the main model during the video.

As of February 2025, the video on YouTube has over 1.3 billion views.

== Live performances ==
On January 17, 2017, Migos performed the song on Jimmy Kimmel Live!. On February 20, they performed it on The Ellen DeGeneres Show. Migos also performed the song at 2017 BET Awards.

== Media usage ==
The song is featured in the television show Black-ish.

"Bougie", originating from bourgeois, has been a popularly referenced term within African American cultural media. Due to the mass proliferation of the song, the term 'bougie'/'boujee' quickly rose to popularity in hip hop culture and social media. Netizens have also created memes utilizing select lines from the song.

== Charts ==
=== Weekly charts ===
Chart (2016–2017)	Peak position
Australia (ARIA)	34
Australia Urban (ARIA)	3
Belgium (Ultratop 50 Flanders)	50
Belgium (Ultratip Bubbling Under Wallonia)	25
Canada Hot 100 (Billboard)	5
Czech Republic Singles Digital (ČNS IFPI)	69
Denmark (Tracklisten)	39
France (SNEP)	77
Germany (GfK)	65
Ireland (IRMA)	40
Netherlands (Single Top 100)	41
New Zealand (Recorded Music NZ)	17
Norway (VG-lista)	29
Portugal (AFP)	34
Scottish Singles Sales (Official Charts)	87
Sweden (Sverigetopplistan)	37
Switzerland (Schweizer Hitparade)	31
UK Singles (Official Charts)	30
UK Indie (Official Charts)	1
US Billboard Hot 100	1
US Hot R&B/Hip-Hop Songs (Billboard)	1
US Pop Airplay (Billboard)	31
US Rhythmic Airplay (Billboard)	1

=== Year-end charts ===
Chart (2017)	Position
Canada (Canadian Hot 100)	42
France (SNEP)	171
US Billboard Hot 100	6
US Hot R&B/Hip-Hop Songs (Billboard)	4
US Rhythmic (Billboard)	14

=== Decade-end charts ===
Chart (2010–2019)	Position
US Hot R&B/Hip-Hop Songs (Billboard)	46

== Certifications ==
Region	Certification	Certified units/sales
Australia (ARIA)	2× Platinum	140,000^{‡}
Denmark (IFPI Danmark)	Platinum	90,000^{‡}
France (SNEP)	Platinum	133,333^{‡}
Germany (BVMI)	Gold	200,000^{‡}
Italy (FIMI)	Platinum	50,000^{‡}
New Zealand (RMNZ)	3× Platinum	90,000^{‡}
Poland (ZPAV)	Gold	25,000^{‡}
Portugal (AFP)	Platinum	10,000^{‡}
United Kingdom (BPI)	Platinum	600,000^{‡}
United States (RIAA)	4× Platinum	4,000,000^{‡}
^{‡} Sales+streaming figures based on certification alone.

== See also ==
- List of Billboard Hot 100 number-one singles of 2017
- List of Billboard Rhythmic number-one songs of the 2010s
- List of number-one R&B/hip-hop songs of 2017 (U.S.)
