= T-Shirt (Migos song) =

Single by Migos

from the album Culture
- Released: February 14, 2017
- Recorded: 2016
- Genre: Hip hop; trap
- Length: 4:02
- Label: Quality Control; 300
- Songwriters: Quavious Marshall; Kirsnick Ball; Kiari Cephus; Shadiyah Advihasa; James Rosser, Jr.; Brandon Rackley
- Producers: Nard & B; XL Eagle

Migos singles chronology
"Bad and Boujee" (2016)	"T-Shirt" (2017)	"Slide" (2017)

Music video
- " T-Shirt" on YouTube

"T-Shirt" is a song by American hip hop group Migos. It impacted radio on February 14, 2017, as the second single from their second studio album Culture (2017). The song was produced by Nard & B alongside their TrenchWerk cohort XL Eagle. The song peaked in the top 20 of the US Billboard Hot 100, and has acquired 373 million YouTube views and 548 million Spotify plays as of October 2026.

Music critic Simon Reynolds praised "T-Shirt" as "vocal alchemy via Auto-Tune, turning profane tales of fast lane life into a holy trance, a choral weave of glistening rap, ecstatic ad libs, and a wordless backing ripple of Gregorian gurgles and droning moans."

== Music video ==
The music video for the song, directed by DAPS and Quavo, features the trio dressed as Arctic hunters in fur and Versace snow boots, with snowmobiles, spears and practicing archery, alongside three women. It was filmed at a mountain range near Lake Tahoe. The video premiered on January 6, 2017, via Migos' YouTube channel.

== Live performances ==
On March 23, 2017, Migos performed "T-Shirt", alongside The Roots, on The Tonight Show Starring Jimmy Fallon.

== Charts ==
=== Weekly charts ===
Chart (2017)	Peak position
Canada Hot 100 (Billboard)	16
France (SNEP)	127
New Zealand Heatseekers (RMNZ)	5
Portugal (AFP)	99
Switzerland (Schweizer Hitparade)	53
UK Singles (Official Charts)	82
UK Hip Hop/R&B (Official Charts)	12
US Billboard Hot 100	19
US Hot R&B/Hip-Hop Songs (Billboard)	11
US Rhythmic Airplay (Billboard)	20

=== Year-end charts ===
Chart (2017)	Position
Canada (Canadian Hot 100)	78
US Billboard Hot 100	52
US Hot R&B/Hip-Hop Songs (Billboard)	25

== Certifications ==
Region	Certification	Certified units/sales
Denmark (IFPI Danmark)	Gold	45,000^{‡}
France (SNEP)	Gold	66,666^{‡}
New Zealand (RMNZ)	Platinum	30,000^{‡}
United Kingdom (BPI)	Gold	400,000^{‡}
United States (RIAA)	2× Platinum	2,000,000^{‡}
^{‡} Sales+streaming figures based on certification alone.

== Release history ==
Country	Date	Format	Label	Ref.
United States	February 14, 2017	Urban contemporary	Quality Control; 300	
