= Deko =

American music producer

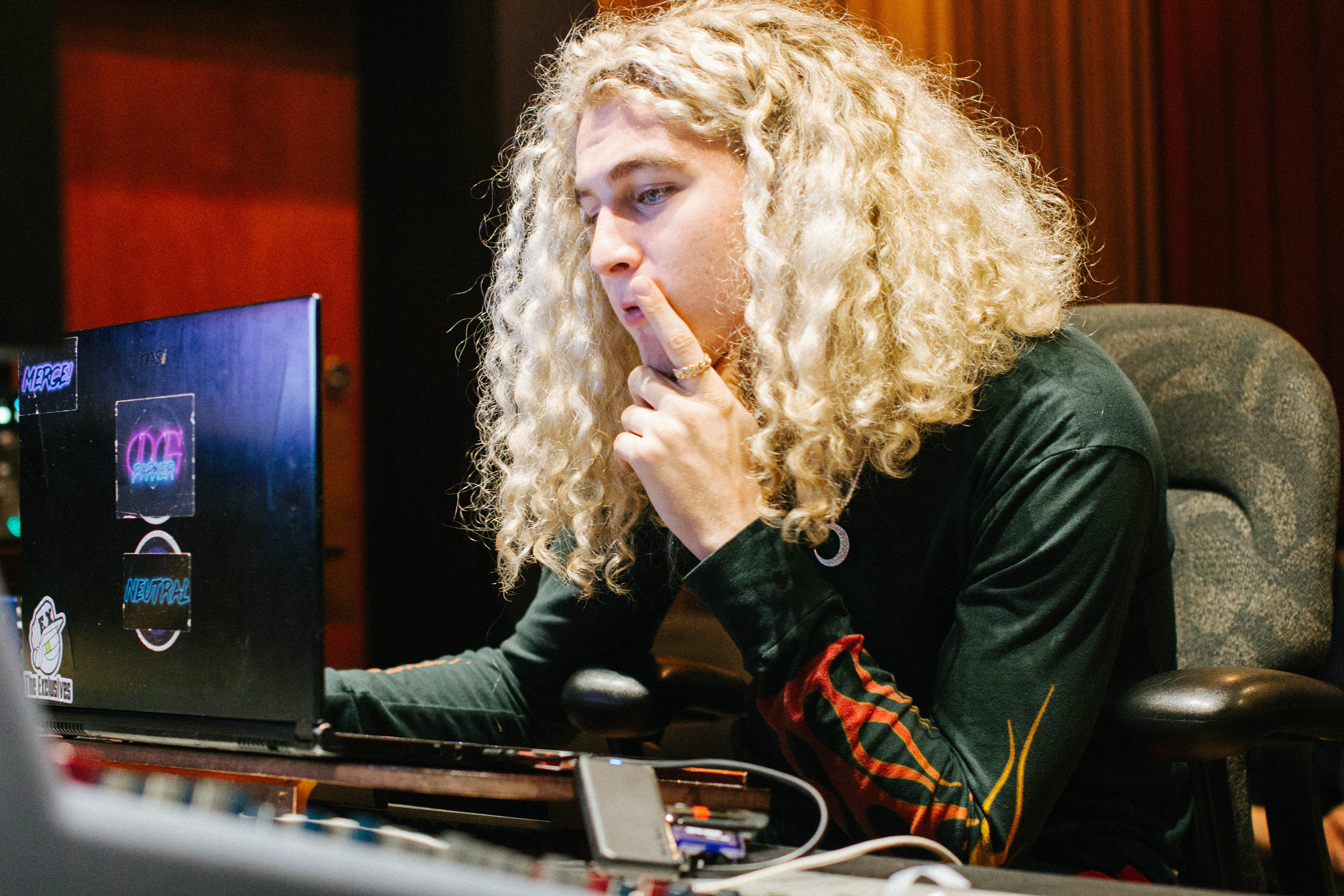
- Deko in 2018

Background information
- Born: Grant Andrew DeCouto; March 24, 1995 (age 31); Roswell, Georgia, U.S.
- Origin: Atlanta, Georgia, U.S.
- Genres: Hip hop, trap, hyperpop, R&B
- Occupations: Record producer, rapper, singer
- Years active: 2013–present
- Label: Warner Chappell

Grant Andrew Decouto (born March 24, 1995), known professionally as Deko, is an American rapper and record producer. He is best known for producing Migos' 2017 single "Slippery". He is part of the EDM trio Merge, with OG Parker and Tee Romano. He and visual artist Osean created Yameii Online, a vocaloid virtual rapper.

== Production discography ==
Track	Year	Artist	Album	Producer(s)
Cat Piss	2018	Ski Mask the Slump God	Stokeley	Merge!
Bipolar	2018	Gucci Mane ft Quavo	Evil Genius	Deko, OG Parker, Smash David
Walk It, Talk It	2018	Migos ft Drake	Culture II	Deko, OG Parker
Sensei	2017	Chris Brown ft A1	Heartbreak on a Full Moon	A1, Deko, OG Parker
Slippery	2017	Migos ft Gucci Mane	Culture	Deko, OG Parker
1Hunnid ft Fetty Wap	2016	K Camp		OG Parker
One Time	2015	Migos		Deko
Commando	2015	Migos	Young Rich Niggas 2	Deko, OG Parker
Recognition	2015	Migos	Yung Rich Nation	Deko

== Solo discography ==
=== Studio albums ===
Title	Details
MoonKid	Released: February 22, 2019; Label: Warner Chappell; Format: Digital download
Iridescent	Released: July 12, 2019; Label: Warner Chappell; Format: Digital download
Moonkid Mondays, Vol. 1	Released: March 2, 2020; Label: Deko; Format: Digital download
Crystalline	Released: March 2, 2020; Label: Yameii For President 2077; Format: Digital download
Moonkid Mondays, Vol. 2	Released: September 14, 2020; Label: Yameii For President 2077; Format: Digital download
Nu Radio!	Released: November 22, 2021; Label: Yameii For President 2077; Format: Digital download
DekoSoCold	Released: December 23, 2022; Label: DreamsOnline; Format: Digital download
nu genesis	Released: September 14, 2023; Label: DreamsOnline; Format: Digital download
Odyssey1	Released: March 1, 2024; Label: DreamsOnline; Format: Digital download
eclipse	Released: March 24, 2025; Label: DreamsOnline; Format: Digital download

=== Singles ===
Title	Details
What Is It (ft. fijimacintosh)	Released: December 3, 2017; Label: Warner Chappell; Format: Digital download
DONT MATTER (Prod. OG Parker)	Released: February 28, 2018; Label: Warner Chappell; Format: Digital download
Venus Retrogade (Fall)	Released: November 18, 2018; Label: Warner Chappell; Format: Digital download
All My Ice (Prod. Jerome Keys)	Released: January 31, 2019; Label: Warner Chappell; Format: Digital download
Excelsior	Released: January 5, 2021; Label: Yameii For President 2077; Format: Digital download
Buss! (Save Me) [feat. Yameii Online]	Released: January 11, 2021; Label: Yameii For President 2077; Format: Digital download
I Love It!	Released: January 14, 2021; Label: Yameii For President 2077; Format: Digital download
Times We Had	Released: January 14, 2021; Label: Yameii For President 2077; Format: Digital download
mythbusters (Prod. spyrosocold)	Released: January 25, 2021; Label: Yameii For President 2077; Format: Digital download
Unimportant (feat. Yameii Online)	Released: July 28, 2021; Label: Yameii For President 2077; Format: Digital download
i called you sober	Released: July 31, 2021; Label: Yameii For President 2077; Format: Digital download
breathe ~_~;	Released: July 14, 2023; Label: Dreams Online LLC/Opposition; Format: Digital download
Gran Turismo ･:*+	Released: August 1, 2023; Label: Dreams Online LLC/Opposition; Format: Digital download
