= Takeoff discography =

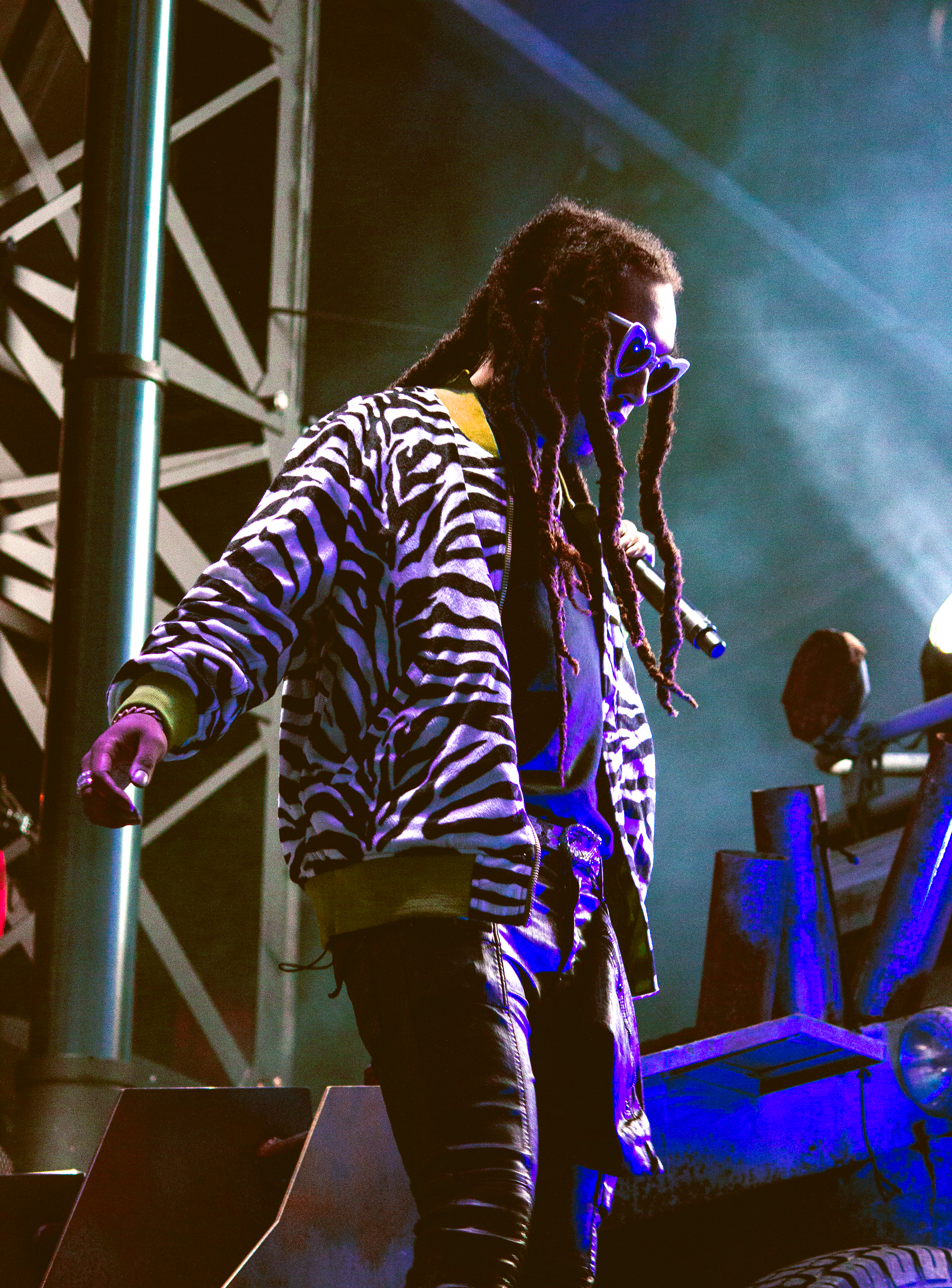
- Takeoff performing in August 2017
- Studio albums: 1
- Singles: 6
- Collaborative mixtapes: 1

American rapper Takeoff released one studio album, one collaborative album, two compilation albums, one extended play, and six singles in his lifetime.

In 2017, Takeoff released the single "Intruder" as a non-album single and was featured on his uncle Quavo's collaborative project, Huncho Jack, Jack Huncho, with fellow rapper Travis Scott, on the song "Eye 2 Eye". The song charted on the Hot 100 at 65th and in Canada at 55th. In that year, he also collaborated with Scottish DJ Calvin Harris for his Funk Wav Bounces Vol. 1 album on the song titled "Holiday". The song, featuring Snoop Dogg and John Legend, charted on the Dance/Electronic Songs chart at 26th.

In 2018, he released his debut studio album The Last Rocket via Quality Control Music, Capitol Records and Motown, on November 2, 2018. The album peaked in the top 30 of the Netherlands and Norway charts at 29th and 24th respectively while placing at 42nd and 51st on the United Kingdom and Sweden charts. It also appeared on the Belgium and Ireland charts at 69th and 62nd. The album spawned the single "Last Memory", which appeared on the US and Canadian charts, while a non-single song from the album "Casper" appeared on the New Zealand Hot chart.

== Albums ==
=== Studio albums ===
Title	Album details	Peak chart positions							
Title	Album details	US	BEL (FL)	CAN	IRE	NLD	NOR	SWE	UK
The Last Rocket	Released: November 2, 2018; Label: Quality Control, Capitol, Motown; Format: CD, LP, digital download, streaming	4	69	8	62	29	24	51	42

=== Collaborative albums ===
Title	Album details	Peak chart positions		
Title	Album details	US	CAN	NLD
Only Built for Infinity Links (with Quavo)	Released: October 7, 2022; Label: Quality Control, Motown; Formats: Digital download, streaming, LP	7	20	87

=== Compilation albums ===
Title	Album details
Quality Control: Control the Streets, Volume 1 (as part of Quality Control)	Released: December 8, 2017; Label: Quality Control, Capitol, Motown; Formats: CD, digital download, streaming
Quality Control: Control the Streets, Volume 2 (as part of Quality Control)	Released: August 16, 2019; Label: Quality Control, Motown; Formats: CD, digital download, streaming

== Extended plays ==
Title	EP details
Culture III (Takeoff's Way)	Released: June 14, 2021; Label: YRN the Label, Quality Control, Capitol, Motown; Format: Digital download, streaming

== Singles ==
=== As lead artist ===
Title	Year	Peak chart positions					Certifications	Album
Title	Year	US	CAN	NZ Hot	SA	WW	Certifications	Album
"Intruder"	2017	—	—	—	—	—		Non-album single
"Last Memory"	2018	54	86	21	—	—	RIAA: Gold	The Last Rocket
"I Suppose" (as part of Quality Control)	2019	—	—	—	—	—		Control the Streets, Vol. 2
"Too Blessed" (with Rich the Kid and Quavo)	2020	—	—	—	—	—		Lucky 7
"All Time High" (with YRN Lingo)	2020	—	—	—	—	—		Noir
"Crypto" (with Rich the Kid)	2022	—	—	—	—	—		Non-album single
"Hotel Lobby (Unc & Phew)" (with Quavo)	2022	55	55	8	33	77	RIAA: Platinum	Only Built for Infinity Links
"Us vs. Them" (with Quavo & Gucci Mane)	2022	— (Note: "Us vs. Them" did not enter the Billboard Hot 100, but peaked at number 21 on the Bubbling Under Hot 100 chart.)	—	—	—	—		Only Built for Infinity Links
"Big Stunna" (with Quavo & Birdman)	2022	—	—	—	—	—		Only Built for Infinity Links
"Nothing Changed" (with Quavo)	2022	— (Note: "Nothing Changed" did not enter the Billboard Hot 100, but peaked at number 17 on the Bubbling Under Hot 100 chart.)	—	—	—	—		Only Built for Infinity Links
"See Bout It" (with Quavo & Mustard)	2022	—	—	—	—	—		Only Built for Infinity Links

=== As featured artist ===
Title	Year	Peak chart positions		Album
Title	Year	US	CAN	Album
"Eye 2 Eye" (Huncho Jack featuring Takeoff)	2017	65	55	Huncho Jack, Jack Huncho
"Who? What!" (Travis Scott featuring Quavo and Takeoff)	2018	43	41	Astroworld
"Dope Boy Phone" (Quavo featuring Takeoff)	2025	—	—	TBA

== Other charted songs ==
List of other charted songs, with selected chart positions, showing year released and album name
Title	Year	Peaks				Certifications	Album
Title	Year	US	US Dance/ Elec.	CAN	NZ Hot	Certifications	Album
"Holiday" (Calvin Harris featuring Snoop Dogg, John Legend and Takeoff)	2017	—	26	—	—		Funk Wav Bounces Vol. 1
"She Gon Wink"	2018	— (Note: "She Gon Wink" did not enter the Billboard Hot 100, but peaked at number seven on the Bubbling Under Hot 100 chart.)	—	—	—		The Last Rocket
"Casper"	2018	99	—	87	32	RIAA: Gold	The Last Rocket
"I Don't Sleep" (Lil Wayne featuring Takeoff)	2020	— (Note: "I Don't Sleep" did not enter the Billboard Hot 100, but peaked at number three on the Bubbling Under Hot 100 chart.)	—	—	37		Funeral
"What's Crackin" (Pop Smoke featuring Takeoff)	2021	— (Note: "What's Crackin" did not enter the Billboard Hot 100, but peaked at number nine on the Bubbling Under Hot 100 chart.)	—	63	—		Faith
"Paid My Dues" (Roddy Ricch featuring Takeoff)	2021	— (Note: "Paid My Dues" did not enter the Billboard Hot 100, but peaked at number eleven on the Bubbling Under Hot 100 chart.)	—	—	—		Live Life Fast
"Party" (DJ Khaled featuring Quavo and Takeoff)	2022	66	—	73	—		God Did
"To The Bone" (with Quavo and YoungBoy Never Broke Again)	2022	83	—	—	32		Only Built for Infinity Links
"Messy" (with Quavo)	2022	— (Note: "Messy" did not enter the Billboard Hot 100, but peaked at number four on the Bubbling Under Hot 100 chart.)	—	—	—		Only Built for Infinity Links
"Feel the Fiyaaaah" (Metro Boomin and ASAP Rocky featuring Takeoff)	2022	59	—	52	—		Heroes & Villains

== Guest appearances ==
List of non-single guest appearances, with other performing artists, showing year released and album name
Title	Year	Other artist(s)	Album
"Holiday"	2017	Calvin Harris, Snoop Dogg, John Legend	Funk Wav Bounces Vol. 1
"Eye 2 Eye"	2017	Huncho Jack	Huncho Jack, Jack Huncho
"Who? What"	2018	Travis Scott, Quavo	Astroworld
"Keep That Shit"	2018	Quavo	Quavo Huncho
"Slidin"	2019	Tyga, Ty Dolla $ign	Legendary
"I Don't Sleep"	2020	Lil Wayne	Funeral
"What's Crackin"	2021	Pop Smoke	Faith
"Paid My Dues"	2021	Roddy Ricch	Live Life Fast
"Party"	2022	DJ Khaled, Quavo	God Did
"Feel the Fiyaaaah"	2022	Metro Boomin, A$AP Rocky	Heroes & Villains
"Patty Cake"	2023	Quavo	Rocket Power
"Back Where It Begins"	2023	Quavo, Future	Rocket Power

== See also ==
- Migos discography
- Quavo discography
- Offset discography
