= Ice Tray (song) =

Single by Quality Control, Quavo and Lil Yachty

from the album Control the Streets, Vol. 1
- Released: December 10, 2017
- Genre: Trap
- Length: 3:33
- Label: Quality Control; Motown; Capitol
- Songwriters: Quavious Marshall; Miles McCollum; Daryl McPherson
- Producer: DJ Durel

Quavo singles chronology
"Forever" (2017)	"Ice Tray" (2017)	"Catch a Body" (2018)

Lil Yachty singles chronology
"Faking It" (2017)	"Ice Tray" (2017)	"Pretender" (2018)

Music video
- "Ice Tray" on YouTube

"Ice Tray" is a song released by record label Quality Control and performed by American rappers Quavo and Lil Yachty. The song, produced by DJ Durel, was released through Quality Control Music, Motown Records and Capitol Records as the fourth single from Quality Control's compilation album, Control the Streets, Vol. 1 (2017).

== Background ==
The song was initially released as the third track from Control the Streets, Vol. 1, before being released as the compilation album's fourth single.

== Controversy with Joe Budden ==
The song is notable for directly sending shots at rapper and media personality Joe Budden. Budden later took to Twitter to respond to the lines: "Soon as it’s all peace [Quavo] decides to unleash this lyrical venom in my direction...that's crazy". Budden also continued his social media antics by directly writing to Quavo, "I am your OG & you will respect me as such." Budden later clarified his stance on his issues with Quavo and Migos: "I have no problem with Quavious. Now, plot twist: I think Quavious is hating on me which makes him a Joe Budden." The song's music video took the controversy even a step further, as it would mock Complex's Everyday Struggle. Budden has had a history of conflicts with Lil Yachty, Quavo and Migos, from when he was bashing Lil Yachty on Everyday Struggle and most notably the incident at the BET Awards pre-show, where Budden walked off set of an interview conducted with his Everyday Struggle colleagues DJ Akademiks and Nadeska Alexis for the hip hop trio, causing a conflict that was momentarily caught on tape.

== Music video ==
The video features lookalikes of Joe Budden, DJ Akademiks and Nadeska Alexis, on a mock re-enactment episode of Complex's Everyday Struggle, titled "Old Rappers Struggling". The video also features cameo appearances from Offset and Takeoff of Migos, as well as jeweler Johnny Dang who has designed jewelry for many famed hip hop stars.

== Charts ==
Chart (2017–18)	Peak position
Canada Hot 100 (Billboard)	67
US Billboard Hot 100	74
US Hot R&B/Hip-Hop Songs (Billboard)	30

== Certifications ==
Region	Certification	Certified units/sales
Canada (Music Canada)	Gold	40,000^{‡}
^{‡} Sales+streaming figures based on certification alone.
