= Qrömelife =

Studio album by Quavo
- Released: October 2, 2026
- Genre: Hip-hop
- Length: 37:35
- Labels: Quality Control; Motown
- Producer: Pharrell Williams

Quavo chronology
Rocket Power (2023)	Qrömelife (2026)

Singles from Qrömelife
- 1. "Haavin" Released: June 26, 2026; 2. "Trance (Walk It Down)" Released: August 14, 2026; 3. "Backwards" Released: September 11, 2026; 4. "House Music" Released: October 2, 2026

Qrömelife (stylized in all caps; pronounced "chrome-life") is the third solo studio album by American rapper Quavo. It was released on October 2, 2026, through Quality Control Music. It is his first solo project since Rocket Power (2023). The album is produced entirely by Pharrell Williams, who also appears as a guest alongside T.I., Future, Offset, Tyler, the Creator, ASAP Rocky, Lil Baby, Yung Miami, and Justin Timberlake.

== Background ==
Quavo wrote on Instagram that he and Pharrell made the album in 2025, when he was "still dealing with grief" after the death of his nephew and Migos groupmate Takeoff, who was shot and killed in Houston on November 1, 2022. He described the album as being about getting through difficult times with his faith, his family, and music, and thanked Pharrell for guiding him creatively. His previous solo album, Rocket Power, debuted at number 18 on the Billboard 200.

The album follows a period of renewed activity between Quavo and Offset, the remaining members of Migos. The group's Instagram account, dormant for two years, was reactivated in May 2026 with photos of the two in a recording studio. In September 2026, Quavo told DJ Greg Street of V-103 that Migos would return with a tour and a new album. He later said the album would be a final Migos project with Offset and would include posthumous vocals from Takeoff.

== Release and promotion ==
Quavo announced the track listing on Instagram on September 25, 2026, and opened pre-orders at the same time.

Over the weekend of September 26–27, Quavo held a listening party for the album in Los Angeles. In attendance was fellow Migos member, Offset, and the track "Away", on which he is featured, played at the event. It is their first collaboration since "We Did It" from Kanye West's Donda 2 (2022), and the first by the pair as Migos since Culture III (2021). Billboard described the track "House Music", featuring Justin Timberlake, as an experimental collaboration that was also previewed at the event.

A short film released to accompany the album revealed that Quavo had become a father for the first time to a daughter. In an interview with Complex, he said fatherhood had given him a new sense of motivation.

== Critical reception ==
Professional ratings
Review scores
Source	Rating
Pitchfork	3.3/10

Alphonse Pierre of Pitchfork gave the album a 3.3/10, writing that the album felt "like attending a networking event" and criticized the production by Pharrell as "phoned-in".

== Track listing ==
Credits attributed from Apple Music. All tracks are produced by Pharrell Williams.

Qrömelife track listing
No.	Title	Writer(s)	Length
1.	"Backwards" (featuring T.I.)	Quavious Marshall; Pharrell Williams; Clifford Harris	3:11
2.	"BA" (featuring Future)	Marshall; Williams; Nayvadius Wilburn	2:29
3.	"Hit-a-Lik"	Marshall; Williams	2:56
4.	"Away" (featuring Offset)	Marshall; Williams; Kiari Cephus	2:23
5.	"Baby Breath" (featuring Pharrell Williams, Tyler, the Creator and ASAP Rocky)	Marshall; Williams; Tyler Okonma; Rakim Mayers	3:47
6.	"Trance (Walk It Down)"	Marshall; Williams; Christopher Barbosa; Edward Chisolm; Brandon Anderson; Tony Cottrell	2:41
7.	"Factory Trim"	Marshall; Williams	2:22
8.	"Sweep"	Marshall; Williams	2:06
9.	"Ball My Love" (featuring Lil Baby)	Marshall; Williams; Dominique Jones; Luther Vandross	2:47
10.	"Haoyu Dewdat" (featuring Yung Miami)	Marshall; Williams; Caresha Brownlee; Ronald Banks; Steven Carrell; Glen Reid Jr.; George Clinton, Jr.; Edward Green; Craig Lawson; Percy Miller; Nathan Perez	2:47
11.	"House Music" (featuring Justin Timberlake)	Marshall; Williams; Justin Timberlake; Theron Thomas	2:45
12.	"Thick in the Mirror"	Marshall; Williams	2:04
13.	"Haavin"	Marshall; Williams; Bill Kapri	2:30
14.	"Destined"	Marshall; Williams	2:42
Total length:			37:35

Extended version
No.	Title	Writer(s)	Producer(s)	Length
15.	"Hotel Lobby (Unc & Phew)" (with Takeoff)	Marshall; Kirshnik Ball; Fabio Aguilar; Shane Lindstrom; Keanu Torres	Aguilar; Keanu Beats; Murda Beatz	2:22
16.	"Hotel Lobby (Unc & Phew) (A Colors Show)" (with Takeoff)	Marshall; Ball; Aguilar; Lindstrom; Torres	Aguilar; Keanu Beats; Murda Beatz	2:45
Total length:				42:42

Notes

- "BA" stands for Bernard Arnault, the CEO of LVMH
- "Haoyu Dewdat" and "Haavin" are stylized in all caps

== Personnel ==
Credits are adapted from Tidal.

- Quavo – vocals
- Pharrell Williams – production, mixing (all tracks); vocals (track 5), additional vocals (11)
- Mike Larson – engineering (all tracks), mixing (1–12, 14), programming (6), additional programming (13)
- Benjamin Thomas – engineering (all tracks), programming (6), additional programming (13)
- Manny Marroquin – mixing
- Francesco Di Giovanni – additional mixing
- Ramiro Fernandez-Seaone – additional mixing
- Colin Leonard – mastering
- Jermaine Dupri – additional vocals (1)
- EveryBodyKnowStroud – engineering (1)
- Hal Ritson – programming, engineering (2)
- Richard Adlam – programming, engineering (2)
- Tammy Infusino – additional vocals (2)
- Future – vocals (2)
- Offset – vocals (4)
- Tyler, the Creator – vocals (5)
- ASAP Rocky – vocals (5)
- DJ Durel – engineering (5)
- Ben Sedano – additional engineering (5)
- Thomas Cullison – additional engineering (5)
- Lil Baby – vocals (9)
- Yung Miami – vocals (10)
- Justin Timberlake – vocals (11)

== Charts ==
Chart performance for Qrömelife
Chart (2026)	Peak position
Australian Albums (ARIA)	98
Australian Hip Hop/R&B Albums (ARIA)	18
French Albums (SNEP)	156
US Billboard 200	103
US Top R&B/Hip-Hop Albums (Billboard)	31
