= Rocket Power (album) =

Studio album by Quavo
- Released: August 18, 2023
- Genres: Hip-hop; trap
- Length: 51:03
- Labels: Quality Control; Motown
- Producers: Aldae; Al Geno; Alex Lustig; Atake; B100; Babywave; Basobeats; BeautifulMvn; Bnyx; Buddah Bless; Cheeze Beatz; Dez Wright; DJ Durel; Felix Leone; Go Grizzly; Isaiah Tejada; Jack Uriah; Jambo; Jimmie Gutch; Kenny Beats; Koncept P; TheLabCook; Macshooter49; The Monsters & Strangerz; Murda Beatz; Nejdos; Oriel Bitton; Pooh Beatz; Schyler O'Neal; SkipOnDaBeat; Sluzyyy; Squat Beats; Tweek Tune; Wheezy

Quavo chronology
Only Built for Infinity Links (2022)	Rocket Power (2023)	Qrömelife (2026)

Singles from Rocket Power
- 1. "Greatness" Released: February 22, 2023; 2. "Turn Yo Clic Up" Released: July 14, 2023

Rocket Power is the second studio album by American rapper Quavo. It was released on August 18, 2023, by Quality Control Music and Motown. The album features guest appearances from the late Takeoff, whom the album is dedicated to, Future, Young Thug, Hunxho, and BabyDrill.

Rocket Power is a follow up to Quavo's debut album, Quavo Huncho, and his collab album with Takeoff, Only Built for Infinity Links. The album debuted at number 18 on the US Billboard 200 chart. The album also debuted in the Top 100 in other territories such as Austria, Belgium, Canada, France, Germany, and Switzerland. It was supported by two singles, "Greatness" and "Turn Yo Clic Up".

== Background ==
Rocket Power is dedicated to Quavo's nephew and fellow Migos member Takeoff, who was shot and killed shortly after the release of their collaborative album Only Built for Infinity Links. Quavo has described creating the album as a form of therapy for him, writing:

This album is for the Rocket, our true fans, and also, this is my therapy. This album is a true reflection of how I feel right now. Sometimes I’m good, sometimes I’m down, sometimes I’m disappointed, sometimes I fall apart, but then I always find my strength again. I know everything might not be alright right now, but the Rocket showed me a way to make it right!

On February 22, 2023, Quavo released the album's lead single, titled "Greatness". On April 5, 2023, Quavo announced the album title, dedicating it to Takeoff. On July 14, 2023, Quavo released the second single of the album, "Turn Yo Clic Up", a collaboration with fellow American rapper Future. On July 24, 2023, Quavo released the trailer for the album and discussed the album's themes stating: "This Album Is Embodying All My Emotions. Through the process of healing I've learned to turn tragedy into triumph. I had to dig deep into my purpose and find the power to keep striving". On August 1, 2023, Quavo announced that the album would be delayed by exactly two weeks and now be released 17 days later instead of three. Quavo announced the album's track listing on August 17, 2023, the day before it was released.

== Critical reception ==
Professional ratings
Aggregate scores
Source	Rating
Metacritic	73/100
Review scores
Source	Rating
AllMusic	3.5/5 stars
Clash	7/10
HipHopDX	3.6/5
Pitchfork	7/10
RapReviews	7.5/10

Rocket Power was met with generally positive reviews. At Metacritic, which assigns a normalized rating out of 100 to reviews from professional publications, the album received an average score of 73, based on five reviews, indicating "generally favorable reviews".

Robin Murray of Clash gave a positive review, stating "In the end, Rocket Power isn't perfect, but it's definitely rewarding. For fans, it's simply emotional to hear Quavo in the studio again, doing what he does best. After unimaginable grief, he's able to look to the future – and that in itself is worth cherishing". Steve 'Flash' Juon from RapReviews stated, "The focus of Quavo's Rocket Power is on him – as it should be". HipHopDX critic Will Schube said, "It, like so many mainstream rap records, could be five songs shorter, and would be more successful if some of this fat was trimmed. Even though some of the material sounds like it was left over for solo work pre-tragedy, or supposed to be on the second Unc & Phew tape, it holds back an album that could have been in the best of the year conversation".

Dylan Green of Pitchfork said, "Listening to him navigate those raw emotions while staying the diamond-encrusted course makes for some of his messiest and most mature music yet". Publication AllMusic said, "While the beats are huge and the songs are full of energetic hooks and smooth, snaking flows, a sense of loss and mourning touches all of it".

== Track listing ==
Rocket Power track listing
No.	Title	Writer(s)	Producer(s)	Length
1.	"Fueled Up"	Quavious Marshall; Shane Lindstrom; Kenneth Blume III	Murda Beatz; Kenny Beats	3:08
2.	"Patty Cake" (with Takeoff)	Marshall; Kirshnik Ball; Daryl McPherson; Grant Dickinson	DJ Durel; TheLabCook	2:13
3.	"Mama Told Me"	Marshall; Paul Penso; Allan Lopez; Darold Brown	Koncept P; Tweek Tune	2:25
4.	"Who Wit Me"	Marshall; Benjamin Saint-Fort; Patrick Saint-Fort	Bnyx; BeautifulMvn	2:21
5.	"Narkedo Speaks"	Marshall; B. Saint-Fort	Bnyx	0:54
6.	"Hold Me"	Marshall; B. Saint-Fort; Gregory Hein; James Gutch	Bnyx; Aldae; Jimmie Gutch	2:21
7.	"Where Can I Start"	Marshall; Kevin Price; Timothy McKibbins; Darryl McCorkell; Julius Rivera III	Go Grizzly; B100; Cheeze Beatz; Squat Beats	2:29
8.	"Wall to Wall"	Marshall; Lindstrom; Darryl Clemons; Donald Paton; Abraham Herrera; Edgar Matthews; Tyler Ludy	Murda Beatz; Pooh Beatz; Felix Leone; Jack Uriah	2:42
9.	"Turn Yo Clic Up" (with Future)	Marshall; Nayvadius Wilburn; Ahn-tuan Tran; Basil von Stietencron; Chi Trieu; Maximilian McFarlin	Atake; Basobeats; Sluzyyy; Macshooter49	3:50
10.	"Back Where It Begins" (with Takeoff featuring Future)	Marshall; Ball; Wilburn; Wesley Glass; Justin Glass; Wiktor Kaczmarski	Wheezy; Babywave; Nejdos	3:50
11.	"11.11"	Marshall; Price; McCorkell; Jerel Nance; Raul Bermejo	Go Grizzly; Cheeze Beatz; Jambo	2:30
12.	"Galaxy"	Marshall; Clemons; Alex Lustig; Nance	Pooh Beatz; Lustig	2:39
13.	"Disciples"	Marshall; Lindstrom; Oriel Bitton	Murda Beatz; Bitton	2:48
14.	"Focused" (featuring Young Thug)	Marshall; Jeffery Williams; Tyron Douglas	Buddah Bless	3:57
15.	"Stain" (with Hunxho featuring BabyDrill)	Marshall; DelQuristo Wilson; Ibrahim Dodo; B. Saint-Fort; Rob Davis; Catherine Dennis	Bnyx	3:46
16.	"Not Done Yet"	Marshall; Jordan K. Johnson; Stefan Johnson; Alexander Izquierdo; Edgar Ferrera; Isaiah Tejada; Richard Scarborough; Arial Imani; Jayme Silverstein	The Monsters & Strangerz; SkipOnDaBeat; Tejada	2:20
17.	"Rocket Power"	Marshall; Lindstrom; B. Saint-Fort; Dylan Cleary-Krell; Schyler O'Neal	Murda Beatz; Bnyx; Dez Wright; O'Neal	3:36
18.	"Greatness"	Marshall; Gene Hixon	Al Geno	3:05
Total length:				51:03

== Personnel ==
- Quavo – rap vocals, engineering (all tracks), mixing (track 13)
- Colin Leonard – mastering
- Manny Marroquin – mixing
- Anthony Vilchis – mixing assistance
- Trey Station – mixing assistance
- Zach Pereyra – mixing assistance
- Takeoff – rap vocals (2, 10)
- Future – rap vocals (9, 10)
- Young Thug – rap vocals (14)
- Babydrill – rap vocals (15)
- Hunxho – rap vocals (15)

== Charts ==
Chart performance for Rocket Power
Chart (2023)	Peak position
Austrian Albums (Ö3 Austria)	54
Belgian Albums (Ultratop Flanders)	151
Belgian Albums (Ultratop Wallonia)	79
Canadian Albums (Billboard)	41
French Albums (SNEP)	55
German Albums (Offizielle Top 100)	64
New Zealand Albums (RMNZ)	31
Swiss Albums (Schweizer Hitparade)	7
US Billboard 200	18
US Top R&B/Hip-Hop Albums (Billboard)	4
