= Supastars =

Promotional single by Migos

Promotional single by Migos

from the album Culture II
- Released: January 22, 2018
- Genre: Trap
- Length: 4:53
- Label: Capitol; Motown; Quality Control
- Songwriters: Quavious Marshall; Kirshnik Ball; Kiari Cephus; Carlton Mays, Jr.; Tyron Douglas; Daryl McPherson
- Producers: Honorable C.N.O.T.E.; Buddah Bless; DJ Durel

"Supastars" is a song by American hip hop group Migos, released on January 22, 2018 as a promotional single from their second studio album Culture II (2018). It was produced by Honorable C.N.O.T.E., Buddah Bless and DJ Durel.

== Composition ==
The song features a "luminescent" piano loop and "droning" synth accents in a trap beat, as well as melodic vocals from Migos, who rap about their wealthy lifestyles which accompany their status as "superstars", with mention of new cars and jewelry.

== Critical reception ==
Sheldon Pearce of Pitchfork wrote a mixed review, calling the beat of the song "compositionally dazzling, though, layering various textures atop each other to create a real glow. C Note's keyboard chords nestle into a bed of beaming chimes as a kazoo-like synth blurts out." However, he was more critical of the lyrics, writing,

The trio raps about their staples—clout, cash, trapping, superstardom—and these bars mostly come out in jumbles; each rapper cuts corners, producing some of their least memorable verses in some time. There are plenty of filler bars like Takeoff's "I put my wrist inside the freezer / Came out froze" and more than a few half-baked ideas like Offset's "Marvin the Martian / I'ma put your brain up for auction." When the raps aren't bungled or sketchy, they're forgettable, the product of a group simply painting-by-numbers. 'Supastars' points to the possibility of Culture II being just another big-budget sequel, a shallow cash-in on the hype and not much more.

Frank Guan of Vulture gave a favorable review, describing the instrumental as "a thing of beauty — slender, delicate, rapid, and forceful" and adding, "All Takeoff, Offset, and Quavo have to do is ride along with it. A couple of lines about dedication and exploding heads from Takeoff aside, the lyrics are the usual diamond-encrusted wallpaper, but so what? Lean back into the interior and enjoy the trip."

== Charts ==
Chart (2018)	Peak position
Canada Hot 100 (Billboard)	51
US Billboard Hot 100	53
US Hot R&B/Hip-Hop Songs (Billboard)	27

== Certifications ==
Region	Certification	Certified units/sales
United States (RIAA)	Gold	500,000^{‡}
^{‡} Sales+streaming figures based on certification alone.
