= To the Bone =

To the Bone may refer to:

== Film and TV ==
- To the Bone (film), a 2017 American film
- "To the Bone" (Doctors), a 2003 television episode
- "To the Bone" (Law & Order: Criminal Intent), a 2006 television episode

== Music ==
- ToTheBones, an English rock band
- To the Bone (Kris Kristofferson album) (1981)
- To the Bone (The Kinks album) (1994)
- To the Bone (Steven Wilson album) (2017), or the title track
- To the Bone (song), a song by Quavo and Takeoff with YoungBoy Never Broke Again
