= Narcos (Migos song) =

Single by Migos

from the album Culture II
- Released: July 24, 2018
- Recorded: 2017
- Genre: Trap
- Length: 4:15
- Label: Quality Control; Motown; Capitol
- Songwriters: Quavious Marshall; Kiari Cephus; Kirsnick Ball; Daryl McPherson; Henry Celestin; Robert Martino
- Producers: DJ Durel; Quavo

Migos singles chronology
"Migo Pablo" (2018)	"Narcos" (2018)	"Hot Summer" (2018)

Music video
- Narcos on YouTube

"Narcos" is a song recorded by American hip hop group Migos. The song serves as the fourth single from Migos' third album Culture II, released on July 24, 2018. The song was written by Quavious Marshall, Kiari Cephus, Kirsnick Ball, Daryl McPherson, Henry Celestin and Robert Martino with the production of Wheezy and Quavo. The song peaked at number 36 on the Billboard Hot 100.

== Background ==
The song is the third track on Migos' third album Culture II. The lyrics talk about the Latin drug dealers "Narcotraficantes", the drug trafficking, the life these drug dealers live and how they make money. The song also makes references to the famous Colombian drug dealer and narcoterrorist Pablo Escobar, and also references the famous Medellín Cartel. The official video was released on June 27, 2018, and the song was later sent to US rhythmic contemporary radio on July 24, 2018. The official video contain references from Netflix series Narcos.

== Music video ==
The official music video was directed by Quavo and co-directed by Joseph Desrosiers and was released on June 27, 2018. The video also features guest appearances from 21 Savage and DJ Durel. The video was shot in Miami in the house of American singer Madonna, apparently without her knowledge. The trio appear as drug traffickers, and the video is about the three making a deal with drug sellers, in order to sell more drugs. It also shows the luxury life, their wealth and the money that they earn selling drugs.

== Charts ==
=== Weekly charts ===
Chart (2018)	Peak position
Canada (Canadian Hot 100)	48
France (SNEP)	93
Ireland (IRMA)	84
Portugal (AFP)	75
Switzerland (Schweizer Hitparade)	52
US Billboard Hot 100	36
US Hot R&B/Hip-Hop Songs (Billboard)	17

=== Year-end charts ===
Chart (2018)	Position
US Hot R&B/Hip-Hop Songs (Billboard)	77

== Certifications ==
Region	Certification	Certified units/sales
Brazil (Pro-Música Brasil)	Platinum	40,000^{‡}
Canada (Music Canada)	Gold	40,000^{‡}
New Zealand (RMNZ)	Platinum	30,000^{‡}
Portugal (AFP)	Gold	5,000^{‡}
United Kingdom (BPI)	Silver	200,000^{‡}
United States (RIAA)	3× Platinum	3,000,000^{‡}
^{‡} Sales+streaming figures based on certification alone.

== Release history ==
Region	Date	Format	Label	Ref.
United States	July 24, 2018	Rhythmic contemporary radio	Quality Control; Capitol; Motown	
