= BBO (Bad Bitches Only) =

2018 song by Migos featuring 21 Savage

Song by Migos featuring 21 Savage

from the album Culture II
- Released: January 26, 2018
- Length: 4:11
- Label: Quality Control; Motown; Capitol
- Songwriters: Quavious Marshall; Kiari Cephus; Kirsnick Ball; Shayaa Abraham-Joseph; Tyron Douglas; Kanye West; Daryl McPherson; Mike Dean; Earl Moss
- Producers: Buddah Bless; West; DJ Durel; Quavo; Dean (add.)

"BBO (Bad Bitches Only)" is a song by American hip hop group Migos featuring Atlanta-based rapper 21 Savage. It was released on January 26, 2018 as a track on the former's second studio album Culture II. The song was written by the artists alongside producers Buddah Bless, Kanye West, DJ Durel, and Mike Dean, with another production credit going to Quavo and another writing credit going to Earl Moss for the sampling of The Festivals "You've Got the Makings of a Lover".

== Composition ==
The song contains gospel elements from "You've Got the Makings of a Lover" by the Festivals, a horn instrumental and "futuristic synth blips". 21 Savage opens the song with the chorus, in which he raps about his "iced-out" watches, chain and necklace.

== Critical reception ==
The song was met with generally positive reviews. Jackson Howard of Pitchfork praised the song's production and the influence from Kanye West. In addition, he wrote that "Despite the usual flurry of inventive Migos quotables and opulent brags — Offset says that he's "living the wild life like Tarzan," while Takeoff taunts, "I say Phillipe [sic]/You say 'fill-up'" — no verse steals the show, and sandwiched in between 21's hook, the three members slip into a comfortable back and forth." Rob Arcand of Spin wrote the song "accentuates each rapper's strongest qualities" and that "While 21's hook remains the most penetrating, it's hard to argue that there's ever a weak moment among the four verses. On an album that's otherwise chocked [sic] full hit-or-miss ideas, 'BBO' stands out as the tightest package of the Migos formula from start to finish." Trevor Smith of HotNewHipHop wrote, "the beat is incredibly dynamic, allowing each member to take drastically different directions with their verses and let their personalities shine through".

Uproxx called it the 44th best track of 2018.

== Charts ==
| Chart (2018) | Peak position |
|---|---|
| Canada Hot 100 (Billboard) | 52 |
| US Billboard Hot 100 | 48 |
| US Hot R&B/Hip-Hop Songs (Billboard) | 24 |

== Certifications ==
| Region | Certification | Certified units/sales |
|---|---|---|
| United States (RIAA) | Platinum | 1,000,000^{‡} |
^{‡} Sales+streaming figures based on certification alone.
