= Turn Yo Clic Up =

2023 single by Quavo and Future

Single by Quavo and Future

from the album Rocket Power
- Released: July 14, 2023
- Length: 3:50
- Label: Quality Control; Motown; Capitol
- Songwriters: Quavious Marshall; Nayvadius Wilburn; Ahn-tuan Tran; Basil von Stietencron; Chi Trieu; Maximilian McFarlin
- Producers: Atake; Basobeats; Sluzyyy; Macshooter49

Quavo singles chronology
"Baby" (2023)	"Turn Yo Clic Up" (2023)

Future singles chronology
"Favorite Song (Toxic Version)" (2023)	"Turn Yo Clic Up" (2023)

Music video
- "Turn Yo Clic Up" on YouTube

"Turn Yo Clic Up" is a song by American rappers Quavo and Future, released on July 14, 2023 as the second single from the former's second solo and fourth overall studio album Rocket Power (2023). It was produced by Atake, Basobeats, Sluzyyy and Macshooter49.

== Background ==
Quavo alluded to the song during the weekend prior to its release in a Twitter post: "The Pain Won't Ever Go Away #RocketPower🚀 It's Time To Turn Yo Clicc Up Thru It All." He teased the song and its video on social media the night before it was released.

== Composition ==
The song features a "magnetic" beat providing a "grimey and spacey soundscape" for the rappers' "gruff" flows. Quavo performs the first verse and chorus, centering on maintaining his crew's high position and using his signature echoing ad-libs, while Future performs the second verse, in which he disses football quarterback Russell Wilson, who married Future's ex-girlfriend Ciara ("Goyard bag, tote the cutter / I got it out the field, fuck Russell"), and name-drops his other ex-girlfriends as well ("Go and ask Lori about the Patek / Then go and ask Joie and ask Dess").

== Critical reception ==
Aron A. of HotNewHipHop commented, "Quavo and Future's chemistry undoubtedly thrive every time they team up." Tom Breihan of Stereogum wrote of the song, "It's the kind of breezy, effortless track that many of us would've taken for granted a few years ago. Now, after Takeoff's passing, anything that recalls the peak Migos era sounds weirdly comforting."

== Charts ==
Chart performance for "Turn Yo Clic Up"
Chart (2023–2024)	Peak position
New Zealand Hot Singles (RMNZ)	31
US Billboard Hot 100	83
US Hot R&B/Hip-Hop Songs (Billboard)	24
US Rhythmic Airplay (Billboard)	38
