= BBO =

BBO may stand for:

- Barium boron oxide, another name of barium borate
- Big Bang Observer, planned space gravitational wave observatory
- IATA code for Berbera Airport
- "BBO (Bad Bitches Only)", a song by Migos from the album Culture II
- Beta barium borate (β-BaB_{2}O_{4}) crystal
- Bundesbahn Österreich, a former name for the Austrian Federal Railways
- Bureau Bijzondere Opdrachten, a WWII Dutch secret service
- Bridge Base Online, for the game of bridge
- British Ballet Organization
- BBO, the ICAO code for Flybaboo
- The Basset–Boussinesq–Oseen equation for the motion of a sphere in an unsteady, low-Reynolds number, flow
