= To the Bone (song) =

2022 song by Unc & Phew and YoungBoy Never Broke Again

Song by Unc & Phew and YoungBoy Never Broke Again

from the album Only Built for Infinity Links
- Released: October 7, 2022
- Length: 4:43
- Label: Quality Control; Capitol; Motown; YRN
- Songwriters: Quavious Keyate Marshall; Kirsnick Khari Ball; Kentrell DeSean Gaulden; Ant Tuan Antoine Tran; Chi Nhan Trieu; Lars Engelbarts
- Producers: Atake; Larzz; Sluzyyy

Visualizer video
- "To The Bone" on YouTube

"To the Bone" is a song by American hip hop superduo Unc & Phew and rapper YoungBoy Never Broke Again from the former two's collaborative album Only Built for Infinity Links (2022). It was produced by Atake, Larzz and Sluzyyy.

== Composition ==
The song finds Takeoff "[bending] time" and "[cramming] syllables" while Quavo melodically raps to the beat. YoungBoy on the other hand takes on a gangsta rap style. Critics note that it's an "imitation" of Migos' "Need It," also featuring YoungBoy.

== Music video ==
In a 2023 podcast with YoungBoy Never Broke Again, he announced that Quavo and Takeoff - prior to his death - had flown out to Utah where YoungBoy is currently placed on house arrest to film the official music video, however, YoungBoy noted that he was in a bad mood and regretted canceling the video shoot: "they came out here to do the video, but I think something happened. And it had me in a f*cked up mood. So, I had canceled the video. I regret it, though. It's okay, though."

== Personnel ==
Credits and personnel adapted from Tidal.

Musicians

- Anh Tuan Antoine Tran – production, composer, songwriter
- Chi Nhan Trieu – production, composer, songwriter
- Lars Engelbarts – production, composer, songwriter
- Quavious Keyate Marshall – lead artist, songwriter, composer
- Kirsnick Khari Ball – lead artist, songwriter, composer
- Kentrell DeSean Gaulden – lead artist, songwriter, composer

Technical

- Colin Leonard – master engineering
- Quavo – mixing
- DJ Durel – mixing
- DJ Durel – recording

== Charts ==
Chart performance for "To The Bone"
Chart (2022)	Peak position
New Zealand Hot Singles (RMNZ)	32
US Billboard Hot 100	83
US Hot R&B/Hip-Hop Songs (Billboard)	24
