= Too Hot =

Too Hot may refer to:

- "Too Hot" (Alanis Morissette song), 1991
- "Too Hot" (Kool & the Gang song), 1979
- "Too Hot" (Coolio song), 1995
- "Too Hot" (Jason Derulo song), 2019
- "Too Hot", a song by Prince Buster
- Too Hot, a ring name of Scott Taylor (wrestler)

== See also ==
- 2 Hot, a 1978 album by Peaches & Herb
- "Too Hotty", a 2017 song by Migos
