= Notice Me =

Notice Me may refer to:

- "Notice Me" (Migos song), 2018
- "Notice Me" (Sandée song), 1988
- "Notice Me", a song by SZA from the 2022 album SOS
