= Nothing Changed =

2022 single by Unc & Phew

Single by Unc & Phew

from the album Only Built for Infinity Links
- Released: September 30, 2022
- Genre: Hip hop; trap
- Length: 3:19
- Label: Quality Control; Motown
- Songwriters: Quavious Marshall; Kirsnick Ball; Daryl McPherson; Marcel Korkutata
- Producers: DJ Durel; Mars

Unc & Phew singles chronology
"Big Stunna" (2022)	"Nothing Changed" (2022)	"Big Stunna" (2022)

Music video
- "Nothing Changed" on YouTube

"Nothing Changed" is a song by American hip hop superduo Unc & Phew, composed of rappers and Migos members Quavo and Takeoff, released on September 30, 2022, as the fourth single from their only studio album Only Built for Infinity Links (2022). It was produced by DJ Durel and Mars.

== Content ==
The song finds the rappers reflecting on their past, success and wealth, as well as their loyalty, remaining close to their roots and continuing to work hard nevertheless. Quavo opens the song with the chorus.

== Charts ==
Chart performance for "Nothing Changed"
Chart (2022)	Peak position
US Bubbling Under Hot 100 (Billboard)	17
US Hot R&B/Hip-Hop Songs (Billboard)	44
