= Control the Streets =

Control the Streets may refer to:

- Control the Streets, Volume 1, a 2017 album
- Control the Streets, Volume 2, a 2019 album
