= Us vs. Them (Unc & Phew song) =

2022 single by Unc & Phew featuring Gucci Mane

Single by Unc & Phew featuring Gucci Mane

from the album Only Built for Infinity Links
- Released: July 29, 2022
- Genre: Hip hop; trap
- Length: 3:36
- Label: Quality Control; Motown
- Songwriters: Quavious Marshall; Kirsnick Ball; Radric Davis; Alexander Monro; Daryl McPherson; Mohkom Bhangal; Pepijn Baltus
- Producers: DJ Durel; Duce; Eza; Money Musik

Unc & Phew singles chronology
"Hotel Lobby (Unc & Phew)" (2022)	"Us vs. Them" (2022)	"Big Stunna" (2022)

Gucci Mane singles chronology
"Dissin the Dead" (2022)	"Us vs. Them" (2022)	"Gelati" (2022)

Music video
- "Us vs. Them" on YouTube

"Us vs. Them" is a song by American hip hop superduo Unc & Phew, consisting of rappers and Migos members Quavo and Takeoff, released on July 29, 2022 as the second single from their only studio album Only Built for Infinity Links (2022). It was produced by DJ Durel, Duce, Eza and Money Musik.

== Composition ==
"Us vs. Them" is a trap song with a theme of competition, finding the rappers claiming victory over their enemies. Takeoff begins the song with the chorus, in which he touches on his allies and references "Many Men (Wish Death)" by 50 Cent, before performing the first verse. Quavo raps the second verse, which contains NBA references; he mentions Glen Rice in a drug-related metaphor and compares his duo to Stephen Curry and Klay Thompson. The final verse is performed by Gucci Mane, who calls for the release of then-incarcerated rappers Young Thug and Gunna.

== Music video ==
The music video was directed by Keemotion and released alongside the single. It sees the three artists rapping in a warehouse as fireworks explode behind them. They move to a basketball court, where they are flanked by women holding basketballs, and football field where a game is taking place. The clip also shows a boxer striking blows at a punching bag.

== Charts ==
Chart performance for "Us vs. Them"
Chart (2022)	Peak position
US Bubbling Under Hot 100 (Billboard)	21
