= Only Built for Infinity Links =

Studio album by Unc & Phew
- Released: October 7, 2022
- Recorded: 2021–2022
- Genres: Hip hop; trap
- Length: 59:14
- Labels: Quality Control; Motown
- Producers: Atake; Budda Beats; Buddah Bless; Cloud; DaySix; DJ Durel; Dson Beats; Duce; Evertime; Eza; Fabio Aguilar; Joseph L'Étranger; Keanu Beats; Larzz; Mars; Mike Dean; Money Musik; Murda Beatz; Mustard; Nic Nac; PHIL; Pyroman; Quavo; Rott; Sean Momberger; Sluzyyy; Zaytoven

Quavo chronology
Quavo Huncho (2018)	Only Built for Infinity Links (2022)	Rocket Power (2023)

Takeoff chronology
The Last Rocket (2018)	Only Built for Infinity Links (2022)

Singles from Only Built for Infinity Links
- 1. "Hotel Lobby" Released: May 20, 2022; 2. "Us vs. Them" Released: July 29, 2022; 3. "Big Stunna" Released: August 26, 2022; 4. "Nothing Changed" Released: September 30, 2022; 5. "See Bout It" Released: October 7, 2022

Only Built for Infinity Links is the only studio album by American hip hop duo Unc & Phew, consisting of Quavo and Takeoff. It was released through Quality Control Music and Motown on October 7, 2022. The album contains guest appearances from Mustard, YoungBoy Never Broke Again, Young Thug, Gunna, Summer Walker, Birdman, and Gucci Mane. It was the last project released in Takeoff's lifetime as he was shot and killed just 25 days after the album's release on November 1, 2022.

== Background ==
Quavo and Takeoff worked on the album over a two-year period and "modeled elements of the cover art" on Kanye West and Jay-Z's collaboration for Watch the Throne (2011) as well as Outkast’s album Stankonia (2000). The title is a reference to Raekwon's 1995 debut album Only Built 4 Cuban Linx..., with Takeoff claiming that Raekwon approved of the title, as well as a reference to the "unbreakable bond" that Quavo and Takeoff have as uncle and nephew, respectively. The album was notably made without input from Offset of Migos despite no formal split of the trio; Quavo also stated in an interview that he would like to see his and Takeoff's career "as a duo".

== Critical reception ==
Professional ratings
Aggregate scores
Source	Rating
Metacritic	70/100
Review scores
Source	Rating
AllMusic	4/5 stars
Clash	8/10
HipHopDX	3.7/5
Pitchfork	7.0/10
Slant Magazine	2.5/5 stars

Only Built for Infinity Links received positive reviews from critics. At Metacritic, which assigns a normalized rating out of 100 to reviews from mainstream publications, the album received an average score of 70, based on six reviews, indicating "generally favorable" reviews.

AllMusic praised the album, writing that the duo "delivers the unfazable personality and triplet flows that made their group famous." Robin Murray of Clash praised the album's variety and the two artists' creativity, describing it as "packed with highlights" and calling it a "record that blazes with life". Similarly, HipHopDX's Peter Berry wrote, "Offset or no Offset, Quavo and Takeoff's stylistic DNA holds steady. It's home-grown. It's theirs, and it's as potent as ever."

== Commercial performance ==
Only Built for Infinity Links debuted at number seven on the US Billboard 200 chart, earning 33,000 album-equivalent units (including 2,500 copies in pure album sales) in its first week. The album also accumulated a total of 41.1 million on-demand streams of the album's songs.

== Track listing ==
Only Built for Infinity Links track listing
No.	Title	Writer(s)	Producer(s)	Length
1.	"Two Infinity Links"	Quavious Marshall; Kirsnick Ball; Arem Schefrin; Michael Zager; Tyron Douglas	Buddah Bless; Quavo	2:09
2.	"Tony Starks"	Marshall; Ball; Adam Janecek; Shane Lindstrom	DaySix; Murda Beatz	2:28
3.	"Hotel Lobby"	Marshall; Ball; Fabio Aguilar; Lindstrom; Keanu Torres	Aguilar; Keanu Beats; Murda Beatz	2:22
4.	"Bars into Captions"	Marshall; Ball; André Benjamin; Antwan Patton; Patrick L. Brown; Raymon Murray; Rico Wade; Douglas	Buddah Bless; Quavo	2:47
5.	"See Bout It" (with Mustard)	Marshall; Ball; Dijon McFarlane; Nicholas Balding; Sean Momberger	Mustard; Nic Nac; Momberger	3:00
6.	"To the Bone" (with YoungBoy Never Broke Again)	Marshall; Ball; Kentrell Gaulden; Ant Tuan Antoine Tran; Chi Nhan Trieu; Lars Engelbarts	Atake; Larzz; Sluzyyy	4:43
7.	"Not Out"	Marshall; Ball; Daryl McPherson; Eeti Eratuli	DJ Durel; Evertime	2:57
8.	"Chocolate" (with Young Thug and Gunna)	Marshall; Ball; Jeffery Williams; Sergio Kitchens; McPherson; Raymond Herring	DJ Durel; Rott	3:28
9.	"2.30"	Marshall; Ball; McPherson; Xavier Dotson	Zaytoven	3:26
10.	"Look @ This"	Marshall; Ball; McPherson; Lindstrom; Dotson	Murda Beatz; Zaytoven; DJ Durel	3:16
11.	"Mixy" (with Summer Walker)	Marshall; Ball; Nija Charles; Jeremy McIntyre; Lindstrom; Summer Walker	Murda Beatz; Joseph L'Étranger	4:30
12.	"Messy"	Marshall; Ball; McPherson; Aaron Tanarasoo; Philipp Lindworsky	DJ Durel; Cloud; PHIL	2:57
13.	"Nothing Changed"	Marshall; Ball; McPherson; Marcel Korkutata	DJ Durel; Mars	3:19
14.	"Integration"	Marshall; Ball; Tran	Atake, DJ Durel	3:27
15.	"Big Stunna" (with Birdman)	Marshall; Ball; Bryan Williams; McPherson; Zachary Thomas	Budda Beats; DJ Durel	3:37
16.	"Us vs. Them" (with Gucci Mane)	Marshall; Ball; Radric Davis; Alexander Monro; McPherson; Mohkom Bhangal; Pepijn Baltus	DJ Durel; Duce; Eza; Money Musik	3:36
17.	"Hell Yeah"	Marshall; Ball; Nicolas Zita; Jason Constantin	Dson Beats; Pyroman	3:33
18.	"Tools"	Marshall; Ball; Tran; McPherson; Mike Dean	Atake; DJ Durel; Mike Dean	3:39
Total length:				59:14

== Personnel ==
Performers

- Quavo – rap vocals
- Takeoff – rap vocals
- YoungBoy Never Broke Again – rap vocals (track 6)
- DJ Durel – keyboards (7–10, 12, 15, 16, 18), programming (7, 8, 10, 12, 15, 16, 18)
- Gunna – rap vocals (8)
- Young Thug – rap vocals (8)
- Summer Walker – vocals (11)
- Birdman – rap vocals (15)

Technical

- Colin Leonard – mastering
- Larry Anthony – mastering (15, 16)
- DJ Durel – mixing (1–17), engineering (all tracks)
- Quavo – mixing (1–17)
- Mike Dean – mixing (18)

== Charts ==
=== Weekly charts ===
Weekly chart performance for Only Built for Infinity Links
Chart (2022)	Peak position
Belgian Albums (Ultratop Flanders)	167
Belgian Albums (Ultratop Wallonia)	119
Canadian Albums (Billboard)	20
Dutch Albums (Album Top 100)	87
French Albums (SNEP)	82
Nigeria Albums (TurnTable)	34
Swiss Albums (Schweizer Hitparade)	35
US Billboard 200	7
US Top R&B/Hip-Hop Albums (Billboard)	3

=== Year-end charts ===
2022 year-end chart performance for Only Built for Infinity Links
Chart (2022)	Position
US Top R&B/Hip-Hop Albums (Billboard)	97

2023 year-end chart performance for Only Built for Infinity Links
Chart (2023)	Position
US Billboard 200	188
US Top R&B/Hip-Hop Albums (Billboard)	64

== Certifications ==
Certifications and sales for "Only Built for Infinity Links"
Region	Certification	Certified units/sales
New Zealand (RMNZ)	Gold	7,500^{‡}
^{‡} Sales+streaming figures based on certification alone.
