= Casper (song) =

2018 song by Takeoff

Song by Takeoff

from the album The Last Rocket
- Released: November 2, 2018
- Length: 3:17
- Label: Quality Control; Capitol; Motown
- Songwriter(s): Kirsnick Ball; Joshua Cross; Gary Fountaine
- Producer(s): Cassius Jay; Nonstop da Hitman

Music video
- "Casper" on YouTube

"Casper" is a song by American rapper Takeoff from his debut studio album The Last Rocket (2018). It was produced by Cassius Jay and Nonstop da Hitman.

== Content ==
In the song, Takeoff recounts his success as a rapper and pays tribute to his late grandmother.

== Critical reception ==
The song received generally positive reviews from music critics. Devin Ch of HotNewHipHop gave it a "Very Hottttt" rating and wrote, "he does make like a ghost, when in fact you may have thought he was only referencing the practice of exiting a moving vehicle, or an appreciable Rolls-Royce sitting pretty under umbrage." Jonah Bromwick of Pitchfork wrote, "Takeoff is lyrically all over the place atop a gauzy beat from Nonstop Da Hitman. 'I want to look at the stars today,' he injects with childlike wonder into a hook that would otherwise seem rote. He shouts out his grandma and requests that those he share dinner with say grace. The cosmos, his elders, an abiding religiosity: These are recurring motifs for the rapper born Kirshnik Khari Ball, and this earnestness even makes the album's title seem like more than a cheap joke about his pseudonym."

== Music video ==
The official music video was released on November 27, 2018. Directed by Gabriel Hart, it finds Takeoff on an adventure in space, traveling in a white Rolls-Royce and wearing a spacesuit. After blasting off and going into orbit, he lands on the Moon, where he spends time with models. He hovers over Earth with his rocket shoes and returns there, where he confronts an army of scientists in a neon orange long sleeve shirt and black, ripped jeans.

== Charts ==
Chart (2018)	Peak position
Canada (Canadian Hot 100)	87
New Zealand Hot Singles (RMNZ)	32
US Billboard Hot 100	99
US Hot R&B/Hip-Hop Songs (Billboard)	50

== Certifications ==
Region	Certification	Certified units/sales
United States (RIAA)	Gold	500,000^{‡}
^{‡} Sales+streaming figures based on certification alone.
