= Notice Me (Migos song) =

2018 song by Migos featuring Post Malone

Song by Migos featuring Post Malone

from the album Culture II
- Released: January 26, 2018
- Genre: Trap
- Length: 3:53
- Label: Quality Control; Motown; Capitol
- Songwriters: Quavious Marshall; Kiari Cephus; Kirsnick Ball; Austin Post; Trocon Roberts, Jr.; Steven Bolden
- Producer: FKi 1st

"Notice Me" is a song by the American hip-hop group Migos featuring American rapper Post Malone. It was released on January 26, 2018, as a track from the former's second studio album Culture II. The song was produced by FKi 1st.

== Critical reception ==
In a review of Culture II, Alphonse Pierre of The Fader wrote, "On the FKI-produced 'Notice Me,' which features a seemingly leftover Post Malone chorus, Takeoff delivers one of Culture II's strongest verses, as he patiently keeps pace with the drowsy beat before suddenly diving into the triplet flow that he's always been the best at employing ("Sippin a tea, packin the heat, niggas that lookin for me")."

== Charts ==
Chart (2018)	Peak position
Canada Hot 100 (Billboard)	35
France (SNEP)	156
New Zealand Heatseekers (RMNZ)	4
Sweden Heatseeker (Sverigetopplistan)	11
Switzerland (Schweizer Hitparade)	55
US Billboard Hot 100	52
US Hot R&B/Hip-Hop Songs (Billboard)	26

== Certifications ==
Region	Certification	Certified units/sales
Brazil (Pro-Música Brasil)	Gold	20,000^{‡}
Canada (Music Canada)	Gold	40,000^{‡}
New Zealand (RMNZ)	Platinum	30,000^{‡}
United States (RIAA)	Platinum	1,000,000^{‡}
^{‡} Sales+streaming figures based on certification alone.
