= Culture II =

2018 studio album by Migos

Studio album by Migos
- Released: January 26, 2018
- Studios: 80 Hertz; Miloco (London); 301; Sonomax (Sydney); Alchemix (Brisbane); Blueprint (Manchester); Chalice (Los Angeles); Crank (Northbridge); Cruise Control (Amsterdam); The Fairmont Zimbali Resort (Durban); Fried Music (Helsinki); Hit Factory Criteria (Miami); Mama's House; Mansion (Atlanta); Quad (New York City)
- Genres: Hip hop; trap
- Length: 106:18
- Labels: Quality Control; Capitol; Motown
- Producers: The Arcade; Buddah Bless; Cardo; Cubeatz; Da Honorable C.N.O.T.E.; Deko; DJ Durel; Dun Deal; Earl the Pearll; FigurezMadeIt; FKi 1st; Ill.e; JSDG; Kanye West; Manny Flexx; Metro Boomin; Murda Beatz; Nonstop da Hitman; OG Parker; Pharrell Williams; Quavo; Ricky Racks; StaccDaGreatest; Travis Scott; Ty Dolla Sign; Wheezy; Will Major; Zaytoven

Migos chronology
Culture (2017)	Culture II (2018)	Culture III (2021)

Singles from Culture II
- 1. "MotorSport" Released: October 27, 2017; 2. "Stir Fry" Released: December 20, 2017; 3. "Walk It Talk It" Released: March 18, 2018; 4. "Narcos" Released: July 24, 2018

Culture II is the third studio album by American hip hop group Migos. It was released on January 26, 2018, by Quality Control Music, Capitol Records and Motown. Culture II is a double album consisting of 24 tracks, and features guest appearances from 21 Savage, Drake, Gucci Mane, Travis Scott, Ty Dolla Sign, Big Sean, Nicki Minaj, Cardi B, Post Malone and 2 Chainz. It was executive produced by Quavo, alongside production work from a variety of collaborators including Metro Boomin, Buddah Bless, Kanye West, Pharrell Williams and Murda Beatz, among others. The album serves as a sequel to Migos' previous album, Culture.

Culture II was supported by four singles: "MotorSport", "Stir Fry", "Walk It Talk It" and "Narcos", as well as the promotional single "Supastars". The album received generally positive reviews from critics and debuted at number one on the US Billboard 200. It is Migos' second US number-one album.

== Background ==
In July 2017, a rumor surfaced that Culture II was on a hard drive that was lost by Quavo. Migos confirmed that a single from the album will be dropping soon and was previewed on Rap-Up. Anticipation regarding the upcoming album built due to the Atlanta rap group's use of social media. Posts included many names such as Kanye West, Donald Glover and others who they have worked with, and revealed on January 22 that West helped produce the album.

On November 21, 2017, through a New York Times story on the group, it was revealed that the updated release date for the album was January 2018; earlier reports suggested an October release. Quavo announced on January 8 that he and DJ Durel were mixing the album. On January 15, 2018, Migos announced the release date of January 26 via their official social media accounts. The same day, Quavo posted a snippet of the song "Culture National Anthem". Merchandise for the album has been released within Bloomingdale's 'Music Is Universal' pop-up space in conjunction with Universal Music Group.

Migos' DJ known as DJ Durel says that group only spend 20 to 45 minutes to do each song. He also stated "when they're in the zone, there's no way you can stop them from laying down a good song. It's going to come out perfect. It's not going to come out rushed or anything".

== Promotion ==
=== Singles ===
The album's lead single, "MotorSport", was released on October 27, 2017, and includes lead vocals from Cardi B and Nicki Minaj. The song is produced by Murda Beatz and Cubeatz. The song peaked at number six on the US Billboard Hot 100.

The album's second single, "Stir Fry", was released on December 20, 2017. The song is produced by Pharrell Williams. It peaked at number eight on the Billboard Hot 100.

The album's third single, "Walk It Talk It" featuring Drake, was sent to UK rhythmic contemporary and US urban contemporary radio on March 18, 2018, the same day as the release of the official music video. The song peaked at number 10 on the Billboard Hot 100.

The music video for the song, "Narcos", was released on June 27, 2018. It was later sent to US rhythmic contemporary radio on July 24, 2018, as the album's fourth single. The song initially peaked at number 36 on the Billboard Hot 100.

=== Promotional singles ===
"Supastars" was released as a promotional single on January 22, 2018, shortly after premiering on Zane Lowe's Beats 1 radio. The song is produced by Honorable C.N.O.T.E., Buddah Bless, Quavo and DJ Durel. It peaked at number 53 on the Billboard Hot 100.

== Critical reception ==
Professional ratings
Aggregate scores
Source	Rating
AnyDecentMusic?	6.7/10
Metacritic	69/100
Review scores
Source	Rating
AllMusic	3.5/5 stars
Consequence	B
Exclaim!	6/10
The Guardian	4/5 stars
NME	4/5 stars
The Observer	3/5 stars
Pitchfork	6.4/10
Q	4/5 stars
Rolling Stone	3/5 stars
XXL	4/5

Culture II was met with generally positive reviews. At Metacritic, which assigns a normalized rating out of 100 to reviews from professional publications, the album received an average score of 69, based on 19 reviews. Aggregator AnyDecentMusic? gave it 6.7 out of 10, based on their assessment of the critical consensus.

Dave Heaton of PopMatters praised the album saying, "While not all of these 24 songs are equally impressive, nothing about Culture II feels like they're going through the motions". Jordan Bassett of NME said, "Migos are firing on all cylinders here, their new record a lush, chaotic patchwork that pops with primary colours. The fab three have done it again". Alexis Petridis of The Guardian stated that "for such a gargantuan album, it's surprisingly light on its feet, skipping nimbly between musical styles", complimenting the album's production, but criticising the lyrical themes. Dan Weiss of Consequence said, "The trio gave a double album their best, with plenty of head-turning lines, hilarious stray shouts ("dinner rolls!" on "CC" is a fave), and productions that further dilate the luxury trap spectrum, but not wildly so". In his review, Neil Z. Yeung of AllMusic states, "With enough highlights to form a single digestible effort, Migos could have delivered another culture-defining classic with just a little trimming. Instead, they've taken what should have been a potent, big league statement and diluted it". Meaghan Garvey of Pitchfork said, "It's still a joy to hear the Migos rap, which is why it's especially depressing that Culture II ultimately feels like a drag—a formless grab bag compiled without much care". Scott Glaysher of XXL said, "Although the creative achievements aren't revolutionary, they are thorough and consistent".

In a mixed review, Rolling Stone's Charles Aaron stated: "Culture II ultimately feels less like a celebratory howl from the mountaintop than a transitional inventory dump. With its easily-trimmable 24 tracks, Culture II appears to be tailored to finesse chart rules, which count 1,500 individual song streams toward one full album sale." In another mixed review, Exclaim!'s Calum Slingerland stated: "Having more songs available to stream results in more royalties, though it doesn't equate to a flawless full-length." Kitty Empire of The Observer said, "Culture II was never going to be a modest affair, in which three self-effacing twentysomethings quietly enumerated their blessings. Apart from some anxiety ("Tryna be like the Carters/Gotta be like the Carters" – Too Playa) and exhaustion (Work Hard), Culture II is wall-to-wall diamonds, watches, cars, chains, brands, fashion houses and exotic fauna". Arcade of Sputnikmusic saying "Culture II sounds like a satire of every other rap album released by a major label these days, catering to the lowest common denominator of casual music listener. As a business decision, it's genius; as a piece of music, it's little more than an elaborate consumer scam".

=== Rankings ===
In The Wire magazine's annual critics' poll, British music critic Simon Reynolds named Culture II his favorite release of the year.

Select year-end rankings of Culture II
Publication	List	Rank	Ref.
Clash	Clash Albums of the Year 2018	40	
Complex	50 Best Albums of 2018	50	
People	Top 10 Albums of 2018	5	

== Commercial performance ==
Culture II debuted at number one on the US Billboard 200 with 199,000 album-equivalent units, of which 38,000 were pure album sales in its first week. It is Migos' second US number-one album. On December 14, 2018, Culture II was certified double platinum by the Recording Industry Association of America (RIAA) for combined sales, streaming and track-sales equivalent of two million units.

In 2018, Culture II was ranked as the tenth most popular album of the year on the Billboard 200. By the end of 2018, the album sold over 1,599,000 album-equivalent units in the US, with over 115,000 being pure sales.

== Track listing ==
Disc one
No.	Title	Writer(s)	Producer(s)	Length
1.	"Higher We Go (Intro)"	Quavious Marshall; Kiari Cephus; Kirsnick Ball; Leland Wayne; Danny Zook	Metro Boomin; Quavo	4:15
2.	"Supastars"	Marshall; Cephus; Ball; Carlton Mays, Jr.; Tyron Douglas; Daryl McPherson	Da Honorable C.N.O.T.E.; Buddah Bless; DJ Durel; Quavo	4:53
3.	"Narcos"	Marshall; Cephus; Ball; McPherson; Henry Celestin; Robert Martino	DJ Durel; Quavo	4:15
4.	"BBO (Bad Bitches Only)" (featuring 21 Savage)	Marshall; Cephus; Ball; Shayaa Abraham-Joseph; Douglas; Kanye West; McPherson; Mike Dean; Earl Moss	Buddah Bless; West; DJ Durel; Quavo; Dean^{[a]}	4:11
5.	"Auto Pilot"	Marshall; Cephus; Ball; McPherson	DJ Durel; Quavo	4:47
6.	"Walk It Talk It" (featuring Drake)	Marshall; Cephus; Ball; Aubrey Graham; Joshua Parker; Andrew Decouto; Jerel Nance; Brian Nash; Donald Jenkins; Montay Humphrey; Frederick Hall; Howard Simmons; Korey Roberson; Harbosky Gordon	OG Parker; Deko	4:36
7.	"Emoji a Chain"	Marshall; Cephus; Ball; Wayne; DeaVonte Kimble; Dean	Metro Boomin; Topp; Dean^{[a]}	5:15
8.	"CC" (featuring Gucci Mane)	Marshall; Cephus; Ball; Radric Davis; McPherson	DJ Durel; Quavo	4:19
9.	"Stir Fry"	Marshall; Cephus; Ball; Pharrell Williams; Harry Palmer	Williams	3:10
10.	"Too Much Jewelry"	Marshall; Cephus; Ball; Xavier Dotson; Dean	Metro Boomin; Zaytoven; Dean^{[a]}	4:05
11.	"Gang Gang"	Marshall; Cephus; Ball; Shane Lindstorm; Kurtis McKenzie; Julia Michaels	Murda Beatz; The Arcade	3:01
12.	"White Sand" (featuring Travis Scott, Ty Dolla Sign and Big Sean)	Marshall; Cephus; Ball; Jacques Webster II; Tyrone Griffin, Jr.; Sean Anderson; McPherson; Wesley Glass	Wheezy; Quavo; DJ Durel; Ty Dolla Sign; Travis Scott	3:22

Disc two
No.	Title	Writer(s)	Producer(s)	Length
13.	"Crown the Kings"	Marshall; Cephus; Ball; McPherson; Bob Marley; Peter Tosh	DJ Durel; Quavo	3:49
14.	"Flooded"	Marshall; Cephus; Ball; McPherson; Nance; Isaac Bynum	Earl the Pearll; DJ Durel	4:30
15.	"Beast"	Marshall; Cephus; Ball; Lindstrom; Ilyas Warsama	Murda Beatz; Ill.e	4:20
16.	"Open It Up"	Marshall; Cephus; Ball; Ronald LaTour	Cardo	4:05
17.	"MotorSport" (featuring Nicki Minaj and Cardi B)	Marshall; Cephus; Ball; Onika Maraj; Belcalis Almanzar; Lindstrom; Kevin Gomringer; Tim Gomringer; Ramón Ayala; Eddie Ávila	Murda Beatz; Cubeatz	5:03
18.	"Movin' Too Fast"	Marshall; Cephus; Ball; Jahceim White; Emmanuel Chrispin; Nance	JSDG; Manny Flexx	4:23
19.	"Work Hard"	Marshall; Cephus; Ball; McPherson; Nance; David Cunningham	DJ Durel; Dun Deal; Quavo	5:17
20.	"Notice Me" (featuring Post Malone)	Marshall; Cephus; Ball; Austin Post; Trocon Roberts, Jr.; Steven Bolden	FKi 1st	3:53
21.	"Too Playa" (featuring 2 Chainz)	Marshall; Cephus; Ball; Tauheed Epps; McPherson; Lee Buddle	DJ Durel; Quavo	5:12
22.	"Made Men"	Marshall; Cephus; Ball; Nance; Gary Fountaine; Joshua Cross; Cornell Wheeler, Jr.	Nonstop da Hitman; Cassius Jay^{[a]}	4:48
23.	"Top Down on da Nawf"	Marshall; Cephus; Ball; Ricky Harrell, Jr.	Ricky Racks	4:55
24.	"Culture National Anthem (Outro)"	Marshall; Cephus; Ball; William Gaskin; Travond Durham; Joseph Nguyen; Dean	Will Major; StaccDaGreatest; FigurezMadeIt; Dean^{[a]}	4:43
Total length:				106:18

Notes

- ^{^[a]} signifies an additional producer
- "Narcos" features additional vocals from Filip Nikolic
- "Auto Pilot" was originally titled "Auto Pilot (Huncho on the Beat)"
- The single version of "MotorSport" credits Nicki Minaj and Cardi B as lead artists.

Sample credits

- "BBO (Bad Bitches Only)" contains elements from "You've Got the Makings of a Lover", written by Earl Moss, as performed by the Festivals.
- "Stir Fry" contains an interpolation of "The Champ", written by Harry Palmer.
- "Crown the Kings" contains elements from "Get Up, Stand Up", written by Bob Marley and Peter Tosh, as performed by the Wailers.
- "Made Men" contains elements from "Schweet", written by Cornell Wheeler Jr., from MSXII Sound Design Presents – Lofi Melodics 3.

== Personnel ==
Credits adapted from the album's liner notes.

Musicians

- Danny Zook – guitar (track 1)
- Filip Nikolic – guitar (track 3)
- Mike Dean – keyboard (tracks 4, 10, 24), guitar (track 7), vocoder (tracks 7, 10)
- Lee Buddle – saxophone (track 21)

Technical

- Ethan Stevens – engineering (all tracks)
- Sean Phelan – engineering (all tracks)
- Daryl "DJ Durel" McPherson – engineering (all tracks), recording (tracks 1–24), mixing (tracks 1–8, 10–16, 18–24)
- Buster Ross – studio assistant (all tracks)
- Mike Dean – mixing (tracks 1–8, 10–16, 18–24), mastering (tracks 1–8, 10–16, 18–24)
- Quavo – mixing (tracks 1–8, 10–16, 18–24)
- Thomas "Tillie" Mann – recording (Offset) (tracks 7, 8), mixing (tracks 9, 17)
- Sean Paine – recording assistance (Offset) (track 8)
- Mike Larson – recording (track 9)
- Thomas Cullison – second recording (track 9)
- Leslie Brathwaite – mixing (track 9)
- Colin Leonard – mastering (tracks 9, 17)
- Aubry "Big Juice" Delaine – recording (Nicki Minaj) (track 17)
- Nick Valentin – recording assistance (Nicki Minaj) (track 17)
- Brian Judd – recording assistance (Nicki Minaj) (track 17)
- Jamil "Millz" Alleyne – tracking (track 20)
- Justin "JBTurnMeUp" Boggy – production mixing (track 20)

Additional personnel

- Stole "Moab" Stojmenov – art direction, design
- Danny Zook – sample clearance (Alien Music)
- Ron Cabiltes – sample clearance (Alien Music)

== Charts ==
=== Weekly charts ===
Chart performance for Culture II
Chart (2018)	Peak position
Australian Albums (ARIA)	13
Austrian Albums (Ö3 Austria)	14
Belgian Albums (Ultratop Flanders)	8
Belgian Albums (Ultratop Wallonia)	18
Canadian Albums (Billboard)	1
Czech Albums (ČNS IFPI)	16
Danish Albums (Hitlisten)	3
Dutch Albums (Album Top 100)	2
Finnish Albums (Suomen virallinen lista)	9
French Albums (SNEP)	6
German Albums (Offizielle Top 100)	14
German Albums (Top 20 Hip Hop)	1
Irish Albums (IRMA)	10
Italian Albums (FIMI)	15
New Zealand Albums (RMNZ)	5
Norwegian Albums (VG-lista)	4
Scottish Albums (Official Charts)	63
Slovak Albums (ČNS IFPI)	5
Swedish Albums (Sverigetopplistan)	11
Swiss Albums (Schweizer Hitparade)	5
UK Albums (Official Charts)	4
UK R&B Albums (Official Charts)	4
US Billboard 200	1
US Top R&B/Hip-Hop Albums (Billboard)	1

=== Year-end charts ===
2018 year-end chart performance for Culture II
Chart (2018)	Position
Australian Albums (ARIA)	64
Belgian Albums (Ultratop Flanders)	83
Belgian Albums (Ultratop Wallonia)	147
Canadian Albums (Billboard)	12
Danish Albums (Hitlisten)	38
Dutch Albums (MegaCharts)	53
French Albums (SNEP)	88
Icelandic Albums (Plötutíóindi)	38
New Zealand Albums (RMNZ)	36
South Korean International Albums (Gaon)	98
Swedish Albums (Sverigetopplistan)	92
UK Albums (OCC)	78
US Billboard 200	10
US Top R&B/Hip-Hop Albums (Billboard)	7

2019 year-end chart performance for Culture II
Chart (2019)	Position
US Billboard 200	76
US Top R&B/Hip-Hop Albums (Billboard)	56

=== Decade-end charts ===
Decade-end chart performance for Culture II
Chart (2010–2019)	Position
US Billboard 200	71

== Certifications ==
Certifications for Culture II
Region	Certification	Certified units/sales
Canada (Music Canada)	2× Platinum	160,000^{‡}
Denmark (IFPI Danmark)	Platinum	20,000^{‡}
France (SNEP)	Platinum	100,000^{‡}
Italy (FIMI)	Gold	25,000^{‡}
New Zealand (RMNZ)	2× Platinum	30,000^{‡}
Norway (IFPI Norway)	Gold	10,000^{‡}
Poland (ZPAV)	Gold	10,000^{‡}
United Kingdom (BPI)	Gold	100,000^{‡}
United States (RIAA)	2× Platinum	2,000,000^{‡}
^{‡} Sales+streaming figures based on certification alone.
