= Too Hotty =

Single by Quality Control and Migos featuring Eurielle

from the album Control the Streets, Vol. 1
- Released: May 26, 2017
- Length: 4:57
- Label: Quality Control Music; Motown; Capitol
- Songwriters: Joshua Luellen; Kiari Cephus; Quavious Marshall; Ryan Louder; Lauren Nicole Walker; Kirshnik Ball
- Producer: Southside

Migos singles chronology
"Slippery" (2017)	"Too Hotty" (2017)	"Night Call" (2017)

Music video
- "Too Hotty" on YouTube

"Too Hotty" is a song released by American record label Quality Control and performed by American hip hop trio Migos featuring British singer Eurielle. It was written by the artists alongside Ryan Louder and producer Southside. It was released through Quality Control Music, Motown Records, and Capitol Records on May 26, 2017, as the lead single from Quality Control's compilation album, Control the Streets, Vol. 1 (2017). This was the label's debut single.

== Background ==
The song was initially released as "To Hotty", and was credited to American hip hop trio Migos, composed of the three recording artists. It was later unpublished from SoundCloud. On August 25, 2017, it was re-released as "Too Hotty" and rebranded as a Quality Control track. The song's title was inspired by WWE wrestler Scotty 2 Hotty.

== Critical reception ==
Rap-Up described the song as "head-knocking" and "high-energy", they felt it "featured a haunting vocal sample". Peter Berry of XXL wrote that the song featured "icy cold production" from Southside, and "Offset delivered yet another killer verse with a machine gun flow that rides the beat perfectly". Max Weinstein of the same publication regarded it as a "dreamy song". Phil Witmer of Vice opined that the song is "blessed with an unearthly beat and the endless applicability of the titular figure's name to rap lyrics". Navjosh of HipHop-N-More called it a "typical sounding track".

== Music video ==
The music video was released on August 25, 2017, and was directed by Daps and Migos. In the beginning, Offset can be seen surrounded by candles in a house, intercut with scenes of a luxury sports car. The scene later shifts to the woods as he continues rapping. Quavo later appears in a warehouse as a mechanic. Lastly, Quavo, Offset, and Takeoff can be seen in a parking lot with flames sparking around, as Takeoff finishes the song.

== Charts ==
Chart (2017)	Peak position
US Billboard Hot 100	91
US Hot R&B/Hip-Hop Songs (Billboard)	37
US Rhythmic (Billboard)	39
