= Hotel Lobby (Unc & Phew song) =

2022 single by Unc & Phew

Single by Unc & Phew

from the album Only Built for Infinity Links and Qrömelife (Extended Version)
- Released: May 20, 2022
- Recorded: 2022
- Genre: Trap
- Length: 2:22
- Label: Quality Control; Motown
- Songwriters: Quavious Marshall; Kirshnik Ball; Shane Lindstrom; Keanu Torres; Fabio Aguilar
- Producers: Murda Beatz; Keanu Beats; Aguilar

Unc & Phew singles chronology
"Hotel Lobby" (2022)	"Us vs. Them" (2022)

Music video
- "Hotel Lobby" on YouTube

"Hotel Lobby" is the debut single by American hip hop supergroup Unc & Phew, composed of rappers Quavo and Takeoff. It was released on May 20, 2022, and was produced by Murda Beatz, Keanu Beats and Fabio Aguilar. It is released as the first single off their collaborative album Only Built for Infinity Links. It was later added to the extended version of Quavo’s third studio album Qrömelife.

== Background ==
The song was teased in February 2022 through Migos' Instagram account. Following its announcement prior to release, fans noticed Offset's absence from the record, leading to speculation that Migos would break up.

After Takeoff's passing, Migos eventually disbanded; however, Quavo and Offset reunited at the BET Awards 2023 on June 25, 2023, performing the song as a tribute dedicated to Takeoff.

== Composition ==
The song finds Quavo and Takeoff rapping in their signature "triplet flow" about their wealth, over a trap beat.

== Music video ==
A music video was released alongside the single and directed by Keemotion and Quavo. It pays homage to the 1998 film Fear and Loathing in Las Vegas, with Quavo and Takeoff taking the roles of characters Raoul Duke and Dr. Gonzo respectively. They drive through a desert, dodging bats and picking up hitchhikers, and stop at a "glitzy" Las Vegas hotel, where they are seen taking psychedelic drugs, drinking, smoking, and doing "comedic performances".

== Charts ==
=== Weekly charts ===
2022–2023 weekly chart performance for "Hotel Lobby (Unc & Phew)"
Chart (2022–2023)	Peak position
Canada Hot 100 (Billboard)	55
Global 200 (Billboard)	77
Ireland (IRMA)	74
Netherlands (Single Tip)	15
New Zealand Hot Singles (RMNZ)	8
Portugal (AFP)	160
South Africa Streaming (TOSAC)	28
Switzerland (Schweizer Hitparade)	69
US Billboard Hot 100	55
US Hot R&B/Hip-Hop Songs (Billboard)	12
US Rhythmic Airplay (Billboard)	33

2026 weekly chart performance for "Hotel Lobby (Unc & Phew)"
Chart (2026)	Peak position
Turkey International Airplay (Radiomonitor Türkiye)	8

=== Year-end charts ===
2022 year-end chart performance for "Hotel Lobby (Unc & Phew)"
Chart (2022)	Position
US Hot R&B/Hip-Hop Songs (Billboard)	42

== Certifications ==
Certifications for "Hotel Lobby (Unc & Phew)"
Region	Certification	Certified units/sales
Brazil (Pro-Música Brasil)	Gold	20,000^{‡}
Denmark (IFPI Danmark)	Gold	45,000^{‡}
France (SNEP)	Gold	100,000^{‡}
United Kingdom (BPI)	Silver	200,000^{‡}
United States (RIAA)	Platinum	1,000,000^{‡}
^{‡} Sales+streaming figures based on certification alone.
