= Control the Streets, Volume 1 =

Compilation album by Quality Control
- Released: December 8, 2017
- Recorded: 2016–17
- Genres: Hip hop, trap
- Length: 102:37
- Labels: Quality Control; Capitol; Motown
- Producers: Kevin "Coach K" Lee (exec.); Pierre "Pee" Thomas (also exec.); Bricks da Mane; Buddah Bless; Cubeatz; Digital Nas; DJ Durel; Dreek; DY; Earl the Pearl; Frank Dukes; Honorable C.N.O.T.E.; Jake One; Joey Casanova; Litgangjesus; MajorNine; Mike Almighty; Murda Beatz; Nascent; Quavo; Quay Global; Ricky Racks; Slade da Monsta; Southside; StarKraft; Supah Mario

Quality Control chronology
| Solid Foundation (2014) | Control the Streets, Volume 1 (2017) | Control the Streets, Volume 2 (2019) |

Singles from Quality Control: Control the Streets Volume 1
- 1. "Too Hotty" Released: May 26, 2017; 2. "On Me" Released: September 29, 2017; 3. "My Dawg (Remix)" Released: December 5, 2017; 4. "Ice Tray" Released: December 10, 2017; 5. "Fuck Dat Nigga" Released: January 8, 2018

Professional ratings
Review scores
| Source | Rating |
|---|---|
| Pitchfork | 7.9/10 |
| XXL | 3/5 |

Quality Control: Control the Streets, Volume 1 is a compilation album released by American record label Quality Control. The album was released on December 8, 2017, by Quality Control Music, Capitol Records and Motown. It features artists from the label such as Migos, Lil Yachty, Lil Baby, Marlo, Kollision and City Girls. It has guest appearances from Cardi B, Tee Grizzley, Moneybagg Yo, Kodak Black, Travis Scott, Gucci Mane, Nicki Minaj, Ty Dolla Sign, Eurielle, YRN Lingo, Young Thug and Mango Foo. Meanwhile, the album's production was handled by DJ Durel, Southside, Murda Beatz, Earl the Pearl and many others.

== Background ==
On December 6, 2017, the label's CEO Kevin "Coach K" Lee confirmed the compilation was close to release.

== Singles ==
The album's first single, "Too Hotty" with Migos featuring British singer Eurielle, was released on May 26, 2017. The album's second single, "On Me" with Lil Yachty and Young Thug, was released on September 29, 2017. The album's third single, "My Dawg (Remix)" with Lil Baby and Kodak Black featuring Quavo and Moneybagg Yo, was released on December 5, 2017. The album's fourth single, "Ice Tray" with Quavo and Lil Yachty, was released on December 10, 2017. The album's fifth single, "Fuck Dat Nigga" with City Girls, was released on January 8, 2018.

== Track listing ==
Control the Streets, Volume 1
| No. | Title | Writer(s) | Producer(s) | Length |
|---|---|---|---|---|
| 1. | "Intro" (featuring Quavo, Offset and Lil Yachty) | Kiari Cephus; Quavious Marshall; Miles McCollum; Marcus Slade | Slade da Monsta | 2:26 |
| 2. | "Pop Shit (censored Pop Sh*t)" (with Migos) | Marshall; Cephus; Kirsnick Ball; Dwan Avery | DY | 4:26 |
| 3. | "Ice Tray" (with Quavo and Lil Yachty) | Marshall; McCollum; Daryl McPherson | DJ Durel | 3:33 |
| 4. | "Boat Skirrt" (with Lil Yachty) | McCollum; Joshua Luellen | Southside | 2:18 |
| 5. | "Hellcat" (with Quavo) | Marshall; McPherson; Charles Driggers | DJ Durel; Bricks da Mane | 3:59 |
| 6. | "Um Yea" (with Offset and Cardi B) | Cephus; Belcalis Almanzar; McPherson | DJ Durel | 3:39 |
| 7. | "We the Ones" (with Takeoff and Tee Grizzley) | Ball; Terry Wallace; McPherson | DJ Durel | 3:14 |
| 8. | "Menace" (featuring Lil Yachty, Quavo and Offset) | McCollum; Marshall; Cephus; Luellen | Southside | 2:25 |
| 9. | "My Dawg (Remix)" (with Lil Baby and Kodak Black featuring Quavo and Moneybagg Yo) | Dominique Jones; Dieuson Octave; Marshall; Demario White Jr.; Chris Rosser | Quay Global | 5:17 |
| 10. | "What It Do" (with Migos) | Marshall; Cephus; Ball; Shane Lindstrom | Murda Beatz | 3:26 |
| 11. | "Mediterranean" (with Offset and Travis Scott) | Cephus; Jacques Webster II; Ricky Harrell; Litgangjesus | Ricky Racks; Litgangjesus | 3:44 |
| 12. | "South Africa" (with Quavo) | Marshall; McPherson | Quavo; DJ Durel | 3:44 |
| 13. | "The Load" (with Gucci Mane and Lil Baby featuring Marlo) | Radric Davis; Jones; Rudolph Johnson; Carlton Mays Jr. | Honorable C.N.O.T.E. | 4:07 |
| 14. | "Sides" (with Lil Baby) | Jones; Rosser | Quay Global | 3:00 |
| 15. | "Interview" (with Migos) | Ball; Cephus; Ty-Ron Douglas | Buddah Bless | 2:54 |
| 16. | "Interlude" (with Offset and Lil Yachty) | Cephus; McCollum; Nasir Pemberton | Digital Nas | 1:18 |
| 17. | "Bosses Don't Speak" (with Migos) | Marshall; Cephus; Ball; Harrell | Ricky Racks; Litgangjesus | 4:01 |
| 18. | "Holiday" (with Lil Yachty and Quavo) | McCollum; Marshall; Mays; Jonathan Priester | Honorable C.N.O.T.E.; Supah Mario | 3:29 |
| 19. | "Thick & Pretty" (with Migos) | Marshall; Cephus; Ball; Kevin Gomringer; Tim Gomringer | Murda Beatz | 4:32 |
| 20. | "She for Keeps" (with Quavo and Nicki Minaj) | Marshall; Onika Maraj; Lindstrom | Murda Beatz | 3:57 |
| 21. | "Movin' Up" (with Lil Yachty and Ty Dolla Sign) | McCollum; Tyrone Griffin Jr.; Isaac Bynum | Earl the Pearl | 2:47 |
| 22. | "Space Cadet" (with Kollision) | Rodriquez Woods; Rosser | Quay Global | 3:00 |
| 23. | "Hook Up" (with Offset and Lil Baby) | Cephus; Jones; Rosser | Quay Global | 3:27 |
| 24. | "Violation (Freestyle)" (with Offset) | Cephus; McPherson | DJ Durel | 1:44 |
| 25. | "Fuck Dat Nigga (censored Fu*k Dat Ni**a)" (with City Girls) | Jatavia Johnson; Caresha Brownlee; Chad Thomas | MajorNine | 3:14 |
| 26. | "Too Hotty" (with Migos featuring Eurielle) | Ball; Cephus; Marshall; Lauren Walker; Ryan Louder; Luellen | Southside | 4:55 |
| 27. | "Blow Like a Whistle" (with Quavo and YRN Lingo) | Marshall; Lorenzo Gibson | Mike Almighty | 3:43 |
| 28. | "On Me" (with Lil Yachty and Young Thug) | McCollum; Jeffery Williams; Bynum | Earl the Pearl | 3:36 |
| 29. | "Wrist Thunderstorm" (with Offset and Mango) | Cephus; Jacob Dutton; Slade | Jake One; Slade da Monsta; Nascent | 3:03 |
| 30. | "Live Like Dis" (with Marlo) | Johnson | Bricks da Mane; Dreek; Joey Casanova; StarKraft | 4:00 |
| Total length: | | | | 102:37 |

== Charts ==
=== Weekly charts ===
| Chart (2017) | Peak position |
|---|---|
| Belgian Albums (Ultratop Flanders) | 182 |
| Canadian Albums (Billboard) | 17 |
| Dutch Albums (Album Top 100) | 73 |
| French Albums (SNEP) | 155 |
| Latvian Albums (LaIPA) | 74 |
| New Zealand Heatseeker Albums (RMNZ) | 3 |
| US Billboard 200 | 5 |
| US Top R&B/Hip-Hop Albums (Billboard) | 1 |

=== Year-end charts ===
| Chart (2018) | Position |
|---|---|
| US Billboard 200 | 121 |
| US Top R&B/Hip-Hop Albums (Billboard) | 50 |
