= Last Memory =

2018 single by Takeoff

Single by Takeoff

from the album The Last Rocket
- Released: October 26, 2018
- Genre: Hip hop; trap
- Length: 2:51 (single version); 2:42 (album version)
- Label: Quality Control; Universal; Capitol; Motown
- Songwriters: Kirsnick Ball; John Fitch; Daryl Harleaux
- Producer: Monsta Beatz

Takeoff singles chronology
"Intruder" (2017)	"Last Memory" (2018)	"Too Blessed" (2020)

Music video
- "Last Memory" on YouTube

"Last Memory" is a song by American rapper Takeoff. It was released on October 26, 2018, as the lead single from his only solo studio album The Last Rocket (2018). It was written by Takeoff and the Monsta Beatz, who produced the song as well.

== Composition ==
C. Vernon Coleman II of XXL describes the song having "trap accents" and writes that Takeoff is "still flexing like no tomorrow." Takeoff raps about his success and "waking up after a night he can't remember."

== Music video ==
The music video was uploaded onto the YouTube channel of the Migos, which Takeoff is part of, on October 26, 2018. It finds Takeoff in a mansion, surrounded by women and wealth while rapping.

== Live performances ==
On November 20, 2018, Takeoff performed the song live on The Tonight Show Starring Jimmy Fallon.

== Charts ==
Chart (2018)	Peak position
New Zealand Hot Singles (RMNZ)	21
Canada Hot 100 (Billboard)	86
US Billboard Hot 100	54

== Certifications ==
Region	Certification	Certified units/sales
United States (RIAA)	Gold	500,000^{‡}
^{‡} Sales+streaming figures based on certification alone.
