= The Last Rocket =

Studio album by Takeoff
- Released: November 2, 2018
- Genre: Hip hop; trap
- Length: 35:17
- Label: Quality Control; Capitol; Motown
- Producer: Buddah Bless; Cassius Jay; Cubeatz; DJ Durel; DY; Gezin; Masked Man; Monsta Beatz; Murda Beatz; Nonstop da Hitman; Smokescreen; Wheezy

Takeoff chronology
The Last Rocket (2018)	Only Built for Infinity Links (2022)

Singles from The Last Rocket
- 1. "Last Memory" Released: October 26, 2018

The Last Rocket is the only studio album by American rapper Takeoff. It was released on November 2, 2018, by Quality Control Music, Capitol Records and Motown. First announced through a private party in Los Angeles, California on October 23, 2018, the album's release made Takeoff the second member of Migos to release a solo album, following Quavo's Quavo Huncho in October 2018 and preceding Offset's Father of 4 the following year.

== Background ==
Throughout 2018, all three members of Migos began pursuing solo careers, with Quavo being the first member to release a solo album, releasing Quavo Huncho in October. The previous year, Offset had released a collaborative album with 21 Savage and Metro Boomin entitled Without Warning. Takeoff became the second member to announce a solo album on October 23, at a private listening party held in Los Angeles. The title of the album was announced to be The Last Rocket, and Takeoff confirmed it would include production from longtime Migos collaborator DJ Durel. A track named "Infatuation" was announced to be on the album. Two days later, he released his first single off the album, "Last Memory", along with the music video.

== Critical reception ==
Professional ratings
Aggregate scores
Source	Rating
Metacritic	82/100
Review scores
Source	Rating
AllMusic	3.5/5 stars
Exclaim!	8/10
Highsnobiety	1.5/5
HipHopDX	3.9/5
NME	4/5 stars
Pitchfork	7.7/10
XXL	4/5

The Last Rocket was met with widespread critical acclaim. At Metacritic, which assigns a normalized rating out of 100 to reviews from mainstream publications, the album received an average score of 82, based on six reviews.

In a positive review, Clayton Tomlinson of Exclaim! praised The Last Rocket for its "themes [and] storytelling." Tomlinson described The Last Rocket as a powerful example of Takeoff's skills as a rapper," and described the album as superior to that of fellow Migos member Quavo's debut album Quavo Huncho. Hip hop magazine XXL wrote that "Although large swaths of the lyrical content here could slip seamlessly onto a Migos project, Takeoff's nimble flow and dextrous wordplay is a treat. From a pure rapping perspective, Takeoff is establishing himself as Migos' most dangerous weapon, for however much that's worth". Sam Moore of NME commended the album's runtime and Takeoff's performance: "The record's 35-minute duration feels typical of Takeoff's more humble approach to business, and, while he does occasionally play it rather safe (see the by-the-numbers brag'n'trap of "Soul Plane" and the drowsy lead single "Last Memory"), his debut solo album still manages to more or less prove that, given the chance, Takeoff is capable of standing out on his own." Daniel Spielberger of HipHopDX concluded: "With its brevity and risk-taking, The Last Rocket succeeds at illustrating Takeoff's talents. Though there's no outright banger and some filler, this solo album serves as a glimmer of hope for the longevity of hip hop's current favorite trio."

In a negative review, Trey Alston of Highsnobiety criticized Takeoff's lack of individuality in comparison to other Migos members: "Takeoff's dull delivery, uninspired bars, and mostly uniform beats make what could have been the album that fueled the fire of diehard fans instead a body of work that confirms the critical consensus. The Last Rocket is a scary indicator that either Takeoff is scared to reinvent the wheel so he's trying it in small doses, or there really isn't any stone left unturned for him and Migos on the whole. There are hints of brilliance here that if expanded upon, showcase that there's some hope for Migos yet. But Takeoff's latest is more yawn-inducing than mesmerizing on all fronts; in rap, that's like signing a death warrant on your career. And this is a debut solo album, for Christ's sake. It looks like that rocket is lost in the atmosphere; let's just hope it doesn't come crashing back down."

== Commercial performance ==
The Last Rocket debuted at number four on the US Billboard 200 with 49,000 album-equivalent units (including 5,000 in pure album sales). Two songs from the album managed to chart on the US Billboard Hot 100; "Last Memory" peaked at number 54, while "Casper" charted at number 99.

== Track listing ==
The Last Rocket track listing
No.	Title	Writer(s)	Producer(s)	Length
1.	"Martian"	Kirsnick Ball; Daryl McPherson	DJ Durel	3:08
2.	"She Gon Wink"	Ball; McPherson; Quavious Marshall	DJ Durel	3:36
3.	"None to Me"	Ball; Bryan Simmons; Dwan Avery; Filip Gežin	TM88; DY; Gezin	2:31
4.	"Vacation"	Ball; Shane Lindstrom; Kevin Gomringer; Tim Gomringer	Murda Beatz; Cubeatz	2:49
5.	"Last Memory"	Ball; John Fitch; Daryl Harleaux	Monsta Beatz	2:42
6.	"I Remember"	Ball; Lindstrom; Matthew McQueen	Murda Beatz; Smokescreen	2:59
7.	"Lead the Wave"	Ball; McPherson	DJ Durel	3:25
8.	"Casper"	Ball; Joshua Cross; Gary Fountaine	Cassius Jay; Nonstop da Hitman	3:17
9.	"Insomnia"	Ball; Tyron Douglas	Buddah Bless	2:44
10.	"Infatuation"	Ball; Timothy Johnson III; Corey Ricketts	Masked Man	3:41
11.	"Soul Plane"	Ball; Cross	Cassius Jay	3:18
12.	"Bruce Wayne"	Ball; Wesley Glass; Cross	Wheezy; Cassius Jay	3:47
Total length:				35:17

Notes

- "She Gon Wink" features vocals by Quavo
- "Infatuation" features vocals by Dayytona Fox

== Charts ==
Chart performance for The Last Rocket
Chart (2018)	Peak position
Belgian Albums (Ultratop Flanders)	69
Belgian Albums (Ultratop Wallonia)	108
Canadian Albums (Billboard)	8
Dutch Albums (Album Top 100)	29
Irish Albums (IRMA)	62
Latvian Albums (LAIPA)	27
Norwegian Albums (VG-lista)	24
Swedish Albums (Sverigetopplistan)	51
Swiss Albums (Schweizer Hitparade)	83
UK Albums (Official Charts)	42
US Billboard 200	4
US Top R&B/Hip-Hop Albums (Billboard)	2

== Release history ==
Release dates and formats for The Last Rocket
Region	Date	Label	Format(s)	Ref.
Various	November 2, 2018	Capitol; Motown; Quality Control	Digital download; streaming	
Various	December 14, 2018	Capitol; Motown; Quality Control	CD	
Various	February 22, 2019	Capitol; Motown; Quality Control	Vinyl	
