= ToTheBones =

English rock band

To The Bones
- Origin: Bolton, England
- Genres: Alternative rock
- Years active: 2005 – present
- Labels: Org / Medici / Evening Economies / Martian Pop Records
- Members: Rhys Bradley; Tom Evans; Jude Jagger; Chris Yates
- Past members: Matt Evans; Wayne Riley
- Website: Official website

To The Bones, also known as ToTheBones, are an English four piece rock band from Bolton, England. The group formed in January 2005 and up to date have released four singles and an album.

== Career ==
To The Bones, also known as ToTheBones, are a 4-piece rock band from Bolton, England, who were described by the NME as 'White hot slasher grunge'. The band have performed with many bands over the years including shows with The Eighties Matchbox B-Line Disaster, The Eagles of Death Metal, Hell is For Heroes, Oceansize, The Living End, Deerhunter, Pulled Apart by Horses, Dinosaur Pile Up and many more. The band have also played many festivals such Leeds and Reading, Guilfest, Camden Crawl, Offset Festival, The great escape festival and also a performed on a pilot TV show designed by Zane Lowe.

In 2011, original players Wayne Riley and Matt Evans parted with the band, leading the way for current members Chris Yates on guitar and Jude Jagger on bass to join To The Bones. They feature on all recordings from 2012 onwards which includes the single "Emperor's Ride" which was released on 22 April 2013 and was mixed by the British record producer Dave Eringa.

The single "Rex" was recorded with Dave Eringa in 24 hours in Beethoven Street Studios in London. Eringa reportedly recorded the band for free after being so impressed with the song.

== Current band line up ==
- Rhys Gordon Bradley (Vocals, Guitar)
- Jude Jagger (Bass guitar, Vocals)
- Tom Evans (Drums)
- Chris Yates (Guitar)

== Discography ==
=== Albums ===
- Duke Type A (20 October 2008)
- "Astral Magic" (22 November 2010)

=== Singles ===
Date	Title	Album	UK
25/03/2007	"Rex"	Duke Type A	-
07/07/2008	"Sharkies Bone Symphony"	Duke Type A	-
20/10/2008	"Rex (Dave Eringa Version)"	Duke Type A	-
10/03/2009	"Lips On Red (Sean Genockey Version)"	Duke Type A	

=== EPs ===
- Beakeriser (October 2005)
- The Halo Effect (January 2006)
