= Unc & Phew =

American hip hop duo (2022)

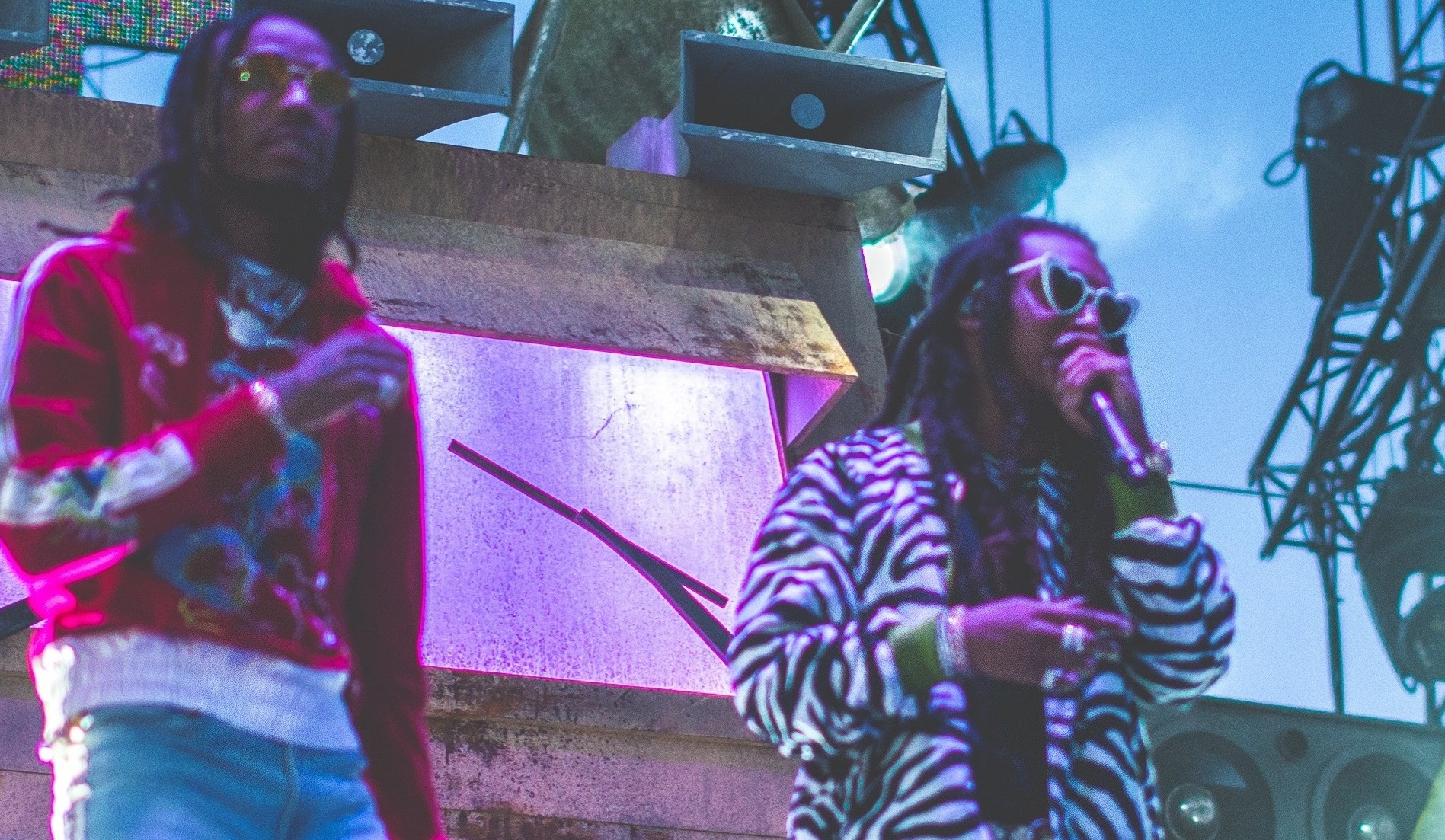
- Quavo (left) pictured performing alongside Takeoff (right) as part of Migos, in 2017

Background information
- Origin: Georgia, US
- Genres: Hip hop; trap
- Years active: 2022
- Labels: Quality Control; Motown
- Spinoff of: Migos
- Past members: Takeoff; Quavo
- Website: uncandphew.com

Unc & Phew were an American hip hop duo composed of rappers and Migos members Quavo and Takeoff. The duo released their only studio album Only Built for Infinity Links on October 7, 2022, to generally favorable reviews. On November 1, 2022, less than a month after the release of the duo's debut album, Takeoff was shot and killed in Houston, Texas.

== History ==
=== Background ===
The group's name is derived from the familial relationship between Quavo and Takeoff as uncle and nephew, "Unc" being a shortened form of the word uncle and "Phew" being a shortened form of the word nephew.

=== Formation and debut studio album ===
In 2022, hip hop group Migos, of whom Quavo and Takeoff are a part, was rumored to have broken up after Quavo's ex-girlfriend Saweetie had reportedly slept with Offset. Quavo alluded to the rift in the duo's song "Messy" and in an interview where he insinuated Offset's lack of loyalty. In May 2022, Quavo and Takeoff released their first track "Hotel Lobby (Unc & Phew)" under the Unc & Phew moniker amid rumors of their rap group Migos' disbandment. In July 2022, they released their single "Us vs. Them" with American rapper Gucci Mane. In August 2022, they released a single with American rapper Birdman titled "Big Stunna". In September 2022, they announced their debut studio album Only Built for Infinity Links with an October 2022 release date. In an interview with Complex, the duo claimed to have "studied legendary rap duos of old throughout the album’s conception, and paid homage to them in the cover art and title". Also in September 2022, they released what would be the fourth single for their album titled "Nothing Changed". On October 31, 2022, a day prior to Takeoff's death, they released the music video for their song "Messy". On November 1, 2022, Takeoff was shot and killed while with Quavo and others at a Houston bowling alley.

== Discography ==
=== Studio albums ===
Title	Album details	Peak chart positions		
Title	Album details	US	CAN	NLD
Only Built for Infinity Links	Released: October 7, 2022; Label: Quality Control, Motown; Formats: LP, digital download, streaming	7	20	87

=== Singles ===
Title	Year	Peak chart positions						Certifications	Album
Title	Year	US	US R&B /HH	CAN	NZ Hot	SA	WW	Certifications	Album
"Hotel Lobby"	2022	55	12	55	8	33	78	RIAA: Platinum	Only Built for Infinity Links
"Us vs. Them" (with Gucci Mane)	2022	— (Note: "Us vs. Them" did not enter the Billboard Hot 100, but peaked at number 21 on the Bubbling Under Hot 100 chart.)	—	—	—	—	—		Only Built for Infinity Links
"Big Stunna" (with Birdman)	2022	—	—	—	—	—	—		Only Built for Infinity Links
"Nothing Changed"	2022	— (Note: "Nothing Changed" did not enter the Billboard Hot 100, but peaked at number 17 on the Bubbling Under Hot 100 chart.)	44	—	—	—	—		Only Built for Infinity Links
"See Bout It" (with Mustard)	2022	—	—	—	—	—	—		Only Built for Infinity Links
