= DJ Durel =

American record producer

- Durel (right) in the studio with Quavo

Background information
- Born: Daryl McPherson; Cleveland, Ohio
- Genres: Hip hop; trap
- Occupation: Producer
- Years active: 2013–present
- Label: Quality Control

Daryl McPherson, known as DJ Durel, is an American record producer, recording engineer, and DJ from Cleveland, Ohio. He was the official DJ of American hip-hop group Migos.

== Career ==
In late 2017, Control the Streets, Vol. 1, a compilation album released by Quality Control Music, featured six tracks produced by DJ Durel – more than any other producer features on the 30-track album.

In 2018, Migos released Culture II, crediting DJ Durel and Quavo as executive producers of the album. DJ Durel is listed as a producer on 12 of the 24 songs on the album and as a recording engineer for the entire album.

== Discography ==
=== Singles ===
List of singles as a lead artist, with selected chart positions
Title	Year	Peak chart positions	Album
Title	Year	US R&B/HH Bub.	Album
Hot Summer (with Migos)	2018	19	Non-album single

=== As featuring artist ===
List of singles as featuring artist, showing year released and album name
Title	Year	Album
"Come On" (Quality Control, City Girls & Saweetie featuring DJ Durel)	2019	Control the Streets, Vol. 2

== Production discography ==
=== 2014 ===
- Migos – Rich Nigga Timeline

=== 2015 ===
- Migos – Yung Rich Nation

=== 2017 ===
- Quality Control – Control the Streets Vol. 1

=== 2018 ===
- Migos – Culture II
- Gucci Mane featuring Migos and Lil Yachty – "Solitaire"
- Lil Yachty – Lil Boat 2
- Takeoff - The Last Rocket

=== 2019 ===
- Young Thug – So Much Fun

=== 2021 ===
- Migos - Culture III

=== 2022 ===
- Bu$hi – "Parachute"
