= Takeoff (rapper) =

American rapper (1994–2022)

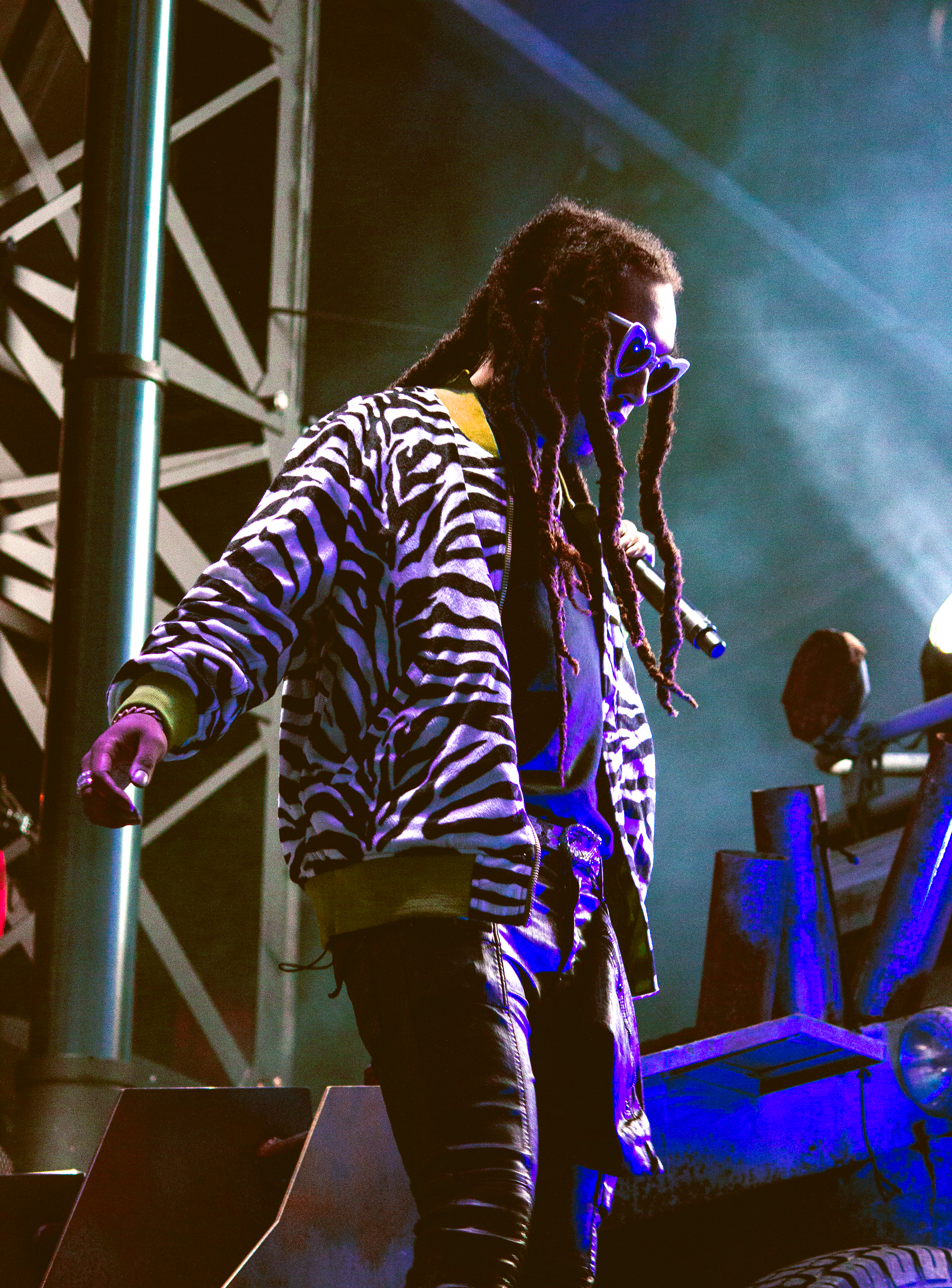
- Takeoff performing in 2017
- Born: Kirsnick Khari Ball; June 18, 1994; Lawrenceville, Georgia, U.S.
- Died: November 1, 2022 (aged 28); Houston, Texas, U.S.
- Cause of death: Murder (gunshot wounds)
- Resting place: Gwinnett Memorial Park, Lawrenceville, Georgia, U.S.
- Occupations: Rapper; singer; songwriter
- Years active: 2008–2022
- Relatives: Quavo (uncle)
- Musical career
- Genres: Hip-hop; trap
- Labels: Quality Control; Motown; Capitol
- Formerly of: Migos; Unc & Phew

Kirsnick Khari Ball (Note: Other sources spell the name as Kirshnik.) (June 18, 1994 – November 1, 2022), known professionally as Takeoff, was an American rapper. He was best known as the youngest member of the hip hop group Migos along with his uncle Quavo and close friend Offset. The group scored multiple top-10 hits on the Billboard Hot 100 including "MotorSport" (featuring Nicki Minaj and Cardi B), "Stir Fry", "Walk It Talk It" (featuring Drake), and "Bad and Boujee" (featuring Lil Uzi Vert), the last of which peaked at number one on the Billboard Hot 100 chart, although he was notably omitted from the song. He also received two Grammy Award nominations as a member of the group. On November 1, 2022, Takeoff was fatally shot in Houston, Texas.

== Early life ==
Kirsnick Khari Ball was born on June 18, 1994, in Lawrenceville, Georgia, a suburb of Atlanta. He grew up in Lawrenceville, and was raised by his mother, Titania Davenport, along with his uncle and future rapmate Quavo. Ball started making beats and developing rhythms in the seventh grade. He started recording music professionally in 2012, when he released the mixtape Juug Season with Quavo and Offset in August of that year as part of the hip hop trio Migos.

== Career ==
=== 2008–2018: Early work with Migos ===
Ball began rapping with his uncle Quavo. The pair met Offset in grade school and became a trio. Ball adopted the stage name Takeoff because he was known for recording verses in a single take. The group initially performed under the stage name Polo Club, but eventually changed their name to Migos. The group released their first full-length project, a mixtape titled Juug Season, on August 25, 2011. They followed with the mixtape No Label, on June 1, 2012.

Migos initially rose to prominence after the release of their single "Versace", in 2013. The song was remixed by Canadian rapper Drake and peaked at number 99 on the Billboard Hot 100 chart and number 31 on the Hot R&B/Hip-Hop Songs chart. Their debut studio album, Yung Rich Nation, was released on July 31, 2015, and featured guest appearances from Chris Brown and Young Thug, and production from Zaytoven and Murda Beatz. The album peaked at number 17 on the Billboard 200.

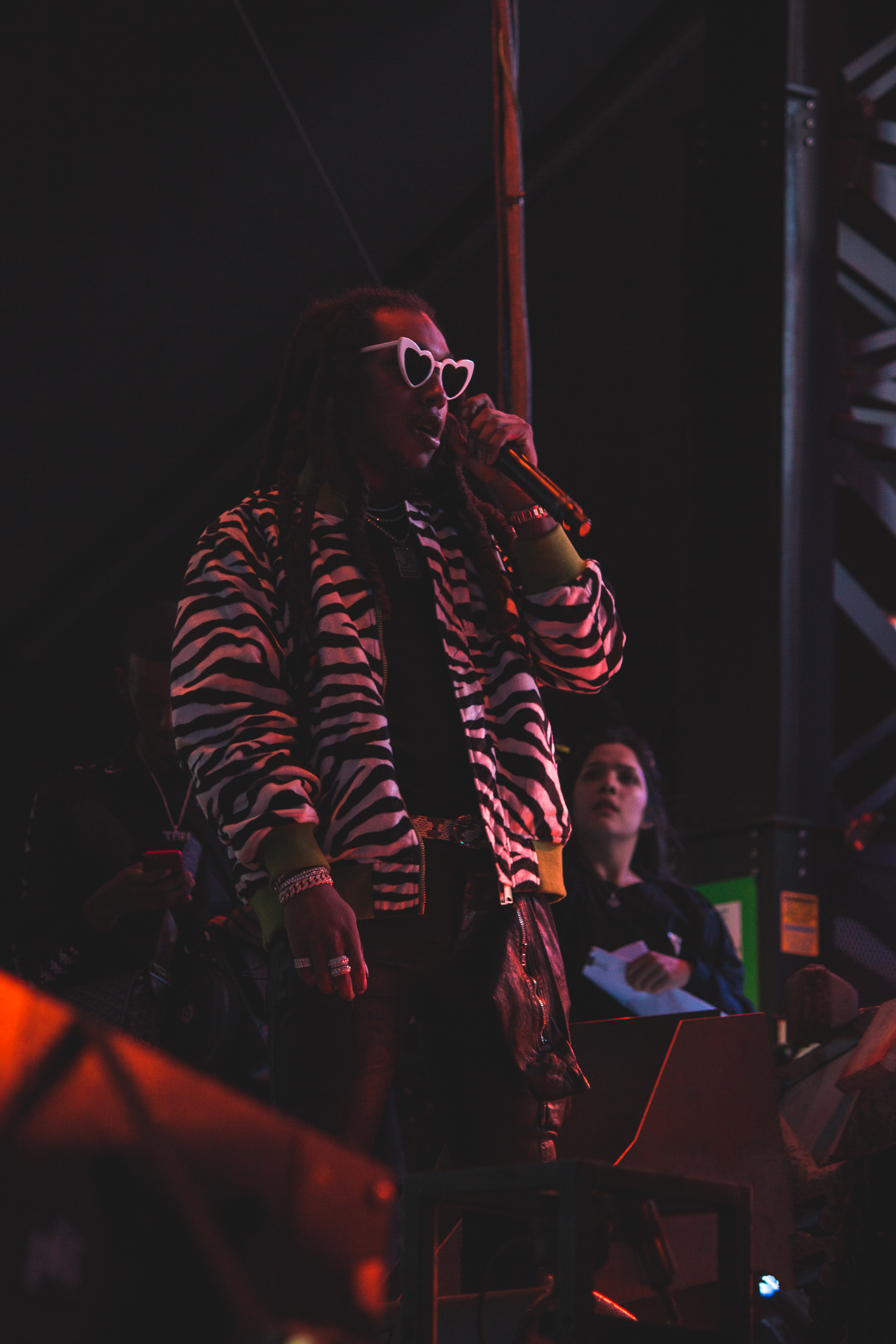
Takeoff performing at the 2017 VELD Music Festival

Migos achieved their first number one single in 2016 with "Bad and Boujee" (featuring Lil Uzi Vert), peaking on the Billboard Hot 100 during the week of January 21, 2017. The song has gone on to be certified four times platinum by the Recording Industry Association of America (RIAA). While he can be seen in one of the background scenes in the music video, Takeoff is not featured nor credited on the song. Takeoff claimed that he was not featured on the song because he was busy at the time of recording. His absence from the song resulted in many memes.

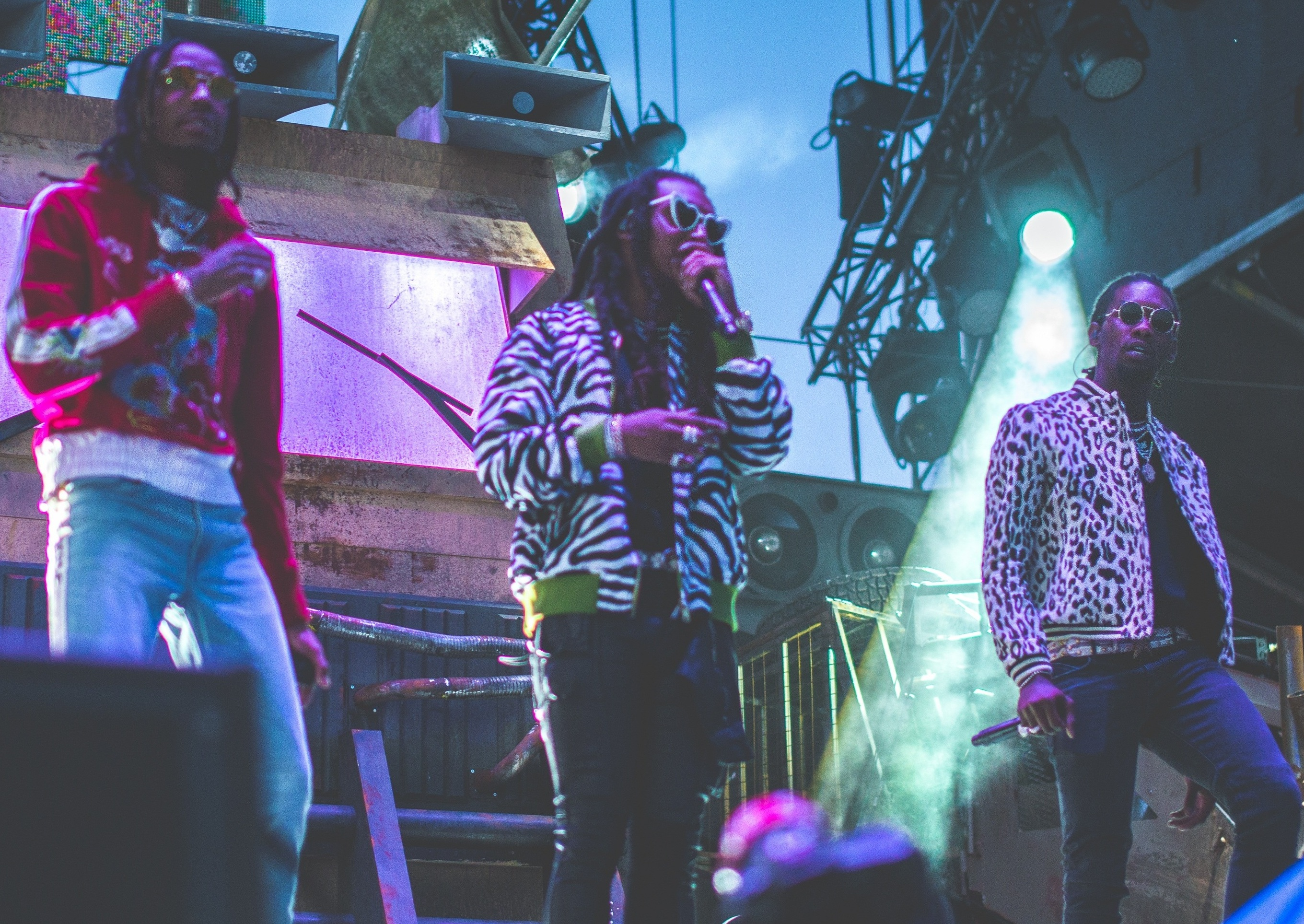
Takeoff (center) pictured performing with Migos, alongside Quavo (left) and Offset (right), in 2017

Migos' second studio album, Culture, was released on January 27, 2017, debuting at number 1 on the US Billboard 200, moving 131,000 album-equivalent units, including 44,000 copies sold, during its first week of release. The album went on to achieve platinum certification in the country in July 2017. The group's third album, Culture II, was released on January 26, 2018. It became Migos' second album to debut at number 1 on the Billboard 200, moving 199,000 equivalent units, including 38,000 copies sold, in its first week of release.

=== 2018–2021: The Last Rocket and later Migos work ===
Following the release of Culture II, on October 23, 2018, Takeoff announced an upcoming solo project titled The Last Rocket to be released the following month. Two days after the announcement, he released his first single off the album, "Last Memory", along with the music video. The album was released on November 2, 2018.

The fourth Migos album, Culture III, was released on June 11, 2021. This would be the final Migos album released during Takeoff's lifetime.

=== 2022: Friction within Migos and Only Built for Infinity Links ===
In October 2022, rumors surrounding a possible disbandment of Migos arose, based on reports that Quavo's ex-girlfriend Saweetie and Offset slept together. Following this, Quavo and Takeoff released a collaborative album titled Only Built for Infinity Links on October 7, 2022, 25 days before Takeoff's death.

== Legal issues ==
=== Georgia Southern University incident ===
On April 18, 2015, Migos were scheduled to headline Georgia Southern University's 2015 Spring concert at Hanner Fieldhouse. The show started at 7:00 p.m. with local opening acts; however, the group took to the stage nearly an hour and a half later than their scheduled 9:00 p.m. set time. Although their performance contract stipulated a minimum 45-minute set length, the group performed for less than 30 minutes before leaving the stage.

The University Police Department, the Statesboro Police Department and the Bulloch County Sheriff's Office, who were present at the concert as security detail, detected a strong scent of marijuana from the group's vans, and the drivers were questioned by law enforcement. Upon further investigation, the rap trio and 12 members of their entourage were arrested for possession of marijuana and another controlled substance, possession of firearms within a school safety zone, possession of firearms during the commission of a crime, and possession of firearms by convicted felons.

While university officials had been aware of Migos' reputation, the group were allowed to perform as the student body had voted to have the group perform among seven acts that were up for consideration, and student fees and ticket sales were used to pay for the concert. According to the performance contract, the group were to be paid $30,000 with their promoter Big House Collective receiving an additional $3,000. University officials initially sought to put Migos in breach of contract due to the group's late arrival, shortened performance, and possession of contraband on university property; however, the university ultimately paid half of the agreed-upon fees.

On April 20, 2015, Takeoff, Quavo, and six members of their entourage were released on bond by the Bulloch County District Attorney's Office while Offset and six others remained in custody without bond. As a result of their arrests, on April 28, 2015, Migos announced they would postpone their Yung Rich Nation Tour until July.

=== Sexual assault lawsuit ===
On August 5, 2020, Takeoff was named as the perpetrator in a civil lawsuit filed by a female victim on charges of "sexual battery, assault, false imprisonment, gender violence, and interference with civil rights" at a June 2020 party in Los Angeles. As of April 2, 2021, it was reported that the Los Angeles District Attorney's office would not be filing criminal charges against Takeoff due to insufficient evidence. The civil suit court proceedings were still in progress as of April 2021.

== Murder and trial ==
Murder of Takeoff
- Location: Houston, Texas, U.S.
- Date: November 1, 2022; 4 years ago 2:40 a.m. (CDT)
- Attack type: Homicide by shooting
- Deaths: 1 (Kirsnick Khari Ball, a.k.a. Takeoff, aged 28)
- Injuries: 2
- Motive: Under investigation
- Accused: Patrick Xavier Clark
- Charges: Murder

The location of Takeoff's shooting in Houston, Texas

On November 1, 2022, following a private party at 810 Billiards & Bowling in the GreenStreet commercial development part of Houston, Texas, Ball was shot multiple times in the head and torso. Approximately 40 people had gathered outside the bowling alley after the party ended around 1:00 a.m. CDT, according to Houston's KHOU-11 TV.

Quavo had posted a video earlier in the night in which he had been driving around Houston with Jas Prince Jr. (the second son of James Prince), who was celebrating his father's birthday. Houston Police Sergeant Michael Arrington stated that an altercation broke out as a large group gathered outside the venue's third-floor entrance, and at least two guns were fired. In a statement, Takeoff's record label said that he was killed by a "stray bullet", and Houston police chief Troy Finner said that he did not believe Takeoff to be the intended target.

The Houston Police Department reported that a fatal shooting had taken place at 2:50 a.m. CDT and that the victim was found dead on arrival while two other victims were "taken in private vehicles to hospitals". The department also refused to release Takeoff's identity until "his family is notified" and his "ID verified by Harris County Institute of Forensic Sciences". Houston police later confirmed that Takeoff had been killed in the shooting.

A nurse who lived near the bowling alley heard the shots and ran to the scene. She tried to help him, but at the time of her arrival, he was already dead.

Two other people, 24-year-old Joshua "Wash" Washington (a business associate of Quavo) and a 23-year-old woman, suffered non-life-threatening injuries during the shooting.

=== Reactions ===
Rapper Desiigner announced in a live broadcast on Instagram that he was leaving rap and could no longer be creative due to the death of Takeoff, although he released a track and music video three weeks later, and has remained active in the rap business since. Hip-hop blogger DJ Akademiks held a three-hour stream in honor of Takeoff, in which he analyzed videos from the moment of the murder of Takeoff, and also called for fighting the ideology of violence in hip-hop, including stopping imitating rappers YNW Melly and Tay-K, both as notable for their murder charges as their music.

Rapper 50 Cent announced a moment of silence in honor of Takeoff during a concert in Finland, during which photos of him appeared on large screens. French soccer player Benjamin Pavard celebrated a goal for Bayern Munich by making a dab gesture, popularized by Migos. The Buffalo Bills football players held their traditional post-practice karaoke broadcast on Instagram, but before the party began, the players honored Takeoff with a moment of silence. The Atlanta Falcons paid tribute to Takeoff in their game against the Los Angeles Chargers, with pictures of him on big screens and his song playing in the background.

Basketball player LeBron James changed his profile photo on his Instagram account to a black and white Takeoff photo. A couple of days later, LeBron came to the Los Angeles Lakers' game against the Cleveland Cavaliers wearing a suit and chain, in homage to an outfit of the rapper in one of his photo shoots. On November 15, rapper Gucci Mane released the track and video "Letter to Takeoff" dedicated to Takeoff, and on January 4, 2023, Takeoff's uncle, Quavo, released a tribute song to his nephew named "Without You". Hip hop media "WHY TV" made tribute with the song to Takeoff.

Takeoff's label, Quality Control Music, released an official statement:

It is with broken hearts and deep sadness that we mourn the loss of our beloved brother Kirsnick Khari Ball, known to the world as Takeoff. Senseless violence and a stray bullet has taken another life from this world and we are devastated. Please respect his family and friends as we all continue to process this monumental loss.

Numerous murals depicting Takeoff began to appear in Atlanta following his death.

Takeoff’s fellow Migos rapper Offset postponed the release of his second solo album, previously reported to be released on November 11, 2022.

Wiz Khalifa called for peace in the hip-hop community following the violent deaths of Ball and fellow rapper PnB Rock who was also shot and killed less than two months prior to Ball.

=== Investigation and legal proceedings ===
On November 26, 2022, 22-year-old Joshua Cameron, also known as Lil Cam 5th, was detained in Houston. On December 2, 33-year-old Patrick Xavier Clark was detained. The police believe it was Clark's shot that killed Takeoff.

On May 26, 2023, Clark was indicted by a grand jury for the murder of Takeoff. If convicted, Clark faces between 25 years to life in prison.

In December 2023, Cameron's case related to Takeoff's death, which involved charges of both felon in possession of a weapon and unlawfully carrying a weapon with a felony conviction, was dismissed. On February 11, 2026, Clark's trial date was set for November 9, 2026. On November 3, 2026, the trial's start date was delayed to April 15, 2027.

=== Funeral ===
On November 5, Takeoff's friends and family held a farewell ceremony for the rapper, and a memorial was formed at the site of his death.

On November 10, Takeoff's private commemoration was held. On November 11, Takeoff's "Celebration of Life" was held at the State Farm Arena. Free tickets were offered for the event and eventually sold out. Offset, Quavo, Cardi B, Drake, Justin Bieber, Yolanda Adams, and Chloe Bailey performed at the ceremony. Attendance totalled over 20,000, including Gucci Mane, City Girls, YG, Lil Yachty, Cee-Lo Green, and Teyana Taylor. Atlanta Mayor Andre Dickens posthumously presented Takeoff with the Phoenix Award. Those present were not allowed to use their phones or take pictures of the event. Following the funeral service, Takeoff was buried at Peachtree Memorial Park in Peachtree Corners, Georgia.

=== Commercial impact ===
A few hours before the shooting, Quavo released a joint video with Takeoff for their song "Messy". After the incident, the clip gained several million views in a couple of hours and topped YouTube's trending list.

Migos' single "Cross the Country", released in 2014, reached number one on the online magazine chart HotNewHipHop. Takeoff and Quavo's joint album Only Built for Infinity Links climbed from number 84 to number 12 on the Billboard 200 chart after Takeoff's death. Takeoff's only solo album, The Last Rocket (2018), took the 189th place on the chart. Migos' albums, Culture and Culture II, recharted at 193rd and 116th, respectively. Quavo and Takeoff's collaborative track, "Hotel Lobby (Unc & Phew)", charted at number 78 on the Billboard Hot 100.

On December 2, 2022, producer and frequent collaborator Metro Boomin released the album Heroes & Villains, which contains the track "Feel the Fiyaaaah", a collaboration with fellow American rapper ASAP Rocky featuring Takeoff.

Quavo and Takeoff's single "Hotel Lobby (Unc & Phew)" was certified platinum on November 30, exactly 4 weeks after Takeoff's death.

== Discography ==
Studio albums

- The Last Rocket (2018)

Collaborative albums

- Only Built for Infinity Links (with Quavo as Unc & Phew) (2022)

== Filmography ==
- Takeover (2026)

== See also ==
- List of murdered hip-hop musicians
