= Circus Maximus Tour =

2023–25 concert tour by Travis Scott

- Tour by Travis Scott
- Poster displaying the European dates of the tour (2023)
- Location: Africa; Asia; Europe; North America; Oceania; South America
- Associated album: Utopia
- Start date: October 11, 2023
- End date: November 19, 2025
- Legs: 6
- No. of shows: 85
- Supporting acts: Teezo Touchdown; Don Toliver; Sheck Wes; Veeze; Skilla Baby; Babyface Ray; Yung Lean; Pablo Chill-E; Lomiiel
- Attendance: 2,100,000
- Box office: $265.1 million
- Website: www.travisscott.com/tour

Travis Scott concert chronology
- Astroworld – Wish You Were Here Tour (2018–2019); Circus Maximus Tour (2023–2025)

The Circus Maximus Tour (also known as the Utopia Tour Presents Circus Maximus) was the fourth concert tour by American rapper Travis Scott, in support of his fourth studio album, Utopia (2023). Teezo Touchdown served as the opening act for the entire first leg and Yung Lean served as the opening act for most of the third leg, while Don Toliver, Sheck Wes, Babyface Ray, Skilla Baby, Veeze, Pablo Chill-E, and Lomiiel served as opening acts at various other shows. The Circus Maximus Tour was Scott's first concert tour in almost five years, following the Astroworld – Wish You Were Here Tour from 2018 to 2019. The tour started on October 11, 2023, at the Spectrum Center in Charlotte, North Carolina, and concluded on November 19, 2025 in Mumbai, Maharashtra, India. Earning a total revenue of $265 million across 85 shows, the Circus Maximus Tour is the highest grossing solo rap tour of all time and the second highest-grossing rap tour of all time after Drake's It's All a Blur Tour, grossing $320 million.

== Set lists ==
=== Leg 1 ===
This set list is representative of the show in Charlotte, North Carolina on October 11, 2023. It is not representative of all concerts for the duration of the tour.

1. "Hyaena"
2. "Thank God"
3. "Modern Jam" (with Teezo Touchdown)
4. "Aye" (originally performed by Lil Uzi Vert)
5. "SDP Interlude"
6. "Sirens"
7. "Praise God" (originally performed by Kanye West)
8. "God's Country"
9. "My Eyes"
10. "Butterfly Effect"
11. "Highest in the Room"
12. "Mamacita"
13. "Circus Maximus"
14. "Delresto (Echoes)" (played from tape during outfit change)
15. "Mafia"
16. "I Know ?"
17. "90210"
18. "Meltdown"
19. "Topia Twins"
20. "No Bystanders"
21. "Fein" (performed twice)
22. "Antidote"
23. "Sicko Mode"
24. "Goosebumps"
25. "Telekinesis"

=== Leg 2 ===
This set list is representative of the show in Chicago, Illinois on January 3, 2024. It is not representative of all concerts for the duration of the tour.

1. "Hyaena"
2. "Thank God"
3. "Modern Jam"
4. "Aye" (originally performed by Lil Uzi Vert)
5. "SDP Interlude"
6. "3500"
7. "Nightcrawler"
8. "Sirens"
9. "Upper Echelon"
10. "Praise God" (originally performed by Kanye West)
11. "God's Country"
12. "My Eyes"
13. "Butterfly Effect"
14. "Highest in the Room"
15. "Mamacita"
16. "Circus Maximus"
17. "Delresto (Echoes)" (played from tape during outfit change)
18. "Maria I'm Drunk"
19. "Can't Say" (with Don Toliver)
20. "Bandit" (originally performed by and with Don Toliver, unreleased at the time)
21. "I Know ?"
22. "90210"
23. "Meltdown"
24. "Topia Twins"
25. "No Bystanders"
26. "Fein" (performed a different number of times each show)
27. "Sicko Mode"
28. "Antidote"
29. "Goosebumps"
30. "Telekinesis"
31. "Lost Forever" (with "Telekinesis" resuming during SZA's part after the song ends)

=== Leg 3 ===
This set list is representative of the show in Arnhem, Netherlands on June 28, 2024. It is not representative of all concerts for the duration of the tour.

1. "Hyaena"
2. "Thank God"
3. "Modern Jam"
4. "Aye" (originally performed by Lil Uzi Vert)
5. "SDP Interlude"
6. "Backr00ms" (originally performed by Playboi Carti)
7. "Type Shit" (originally performed with Future, Metro Boomin, and Playboi Carti)
8. "Nightcrawler"
9. "Sirens"
10. "Upper Echelon"
11. "Praise God" (originally performed by Kanye West)
12. "God's Country"
13. "My Eyes"
14. "Butterfly Effect"
15. "Highest in the Room"
16. "Mamacita"
17. "Circus Maximus"
18. "Delresto (Echoes)" (played from tape during outfit change)
19. "Mafia"
20. "I Know ?"
21. "90210"
22. "Meltdown"
23. "Topia Twins"
24. "No Bystanders"
25. "Fein" (performed a different number of times each show)
26. "Sicko Mode"
27. "Antidote"
28. "Goosebumps"
29. "Parking Lot" (originally performed with Mustard)
30. "Telekinesis"

=== Leg 4 ===
This set list is representative of the show in Santiago, Chile on September 7, 2024. It is not representative of all concerts for the duration of the tour.

1. "Hyaena"
2. "Thank God"
3. "Modern Jam"
4. "Aye" (originally performed by Lil Uzi Vert)
5. "SDP Interlude"
6. "Mo City Flexologist"
7. "Backr00ms" (originally performed by Playboi Carti)
8. "Type Shit" (originally performed with Future, Metro Boomin, and Playboi Carti)
9. "Nightcrawler"
10. "Sirens"
11. "Upper Echelon"
12. "Praise God" (originally performed by Kanye West)
13. "God's Country"
14. "My Eyes"
15. "Butterfly Effect"
16. "Highest in the Room"
17. "Mamacita"
18. "Circus Maximus"
19. "Delresto (Echoes)" (played from tape during outfit change)
20. "Drugs You Should Try It"
21. "I Know ?"
22. "90210"
23. "Meltdown"
24. "Topia Twins"
25. "No Bystanders"
26. "Fein" (performed a different number of times each show)
27. "Sicko Mode"
28. "Antidote"
29. "Goosebumps"
30. "Telekinesis"

== Tour dates ==
List of 2023 concerts
Date (2023)	City	Country	Venue	Opening act	Attendance	Revenue
October 11	Charlotte	United States	Spectrum Center	Teezo Touchdown	15,702 / 15,702 (100%)	$1,576,716
October 13	Raleigh	United States	PNC Arena	Teezo Touchdown	15,292 / 15,292 (100%)	$1,740,793
October 17	Dallas	United States	American Airlines Center	Teezo Touchdown	27,497 / 27,497 (100%)	$3,588,066
October 18	Dallas	United States	American Airlines Center	Teezo Touchdown	27,497 / 27,497 (100%)	$3,588,066
October 20	Kansas City	United States	T-Mobile Center	Teezo Touchdown	15,835 / 16,323 (97%)	$1,683,603
October 22	Denver	United States	Ball Arena	Teezo Touchdown	14,929 / 16,139 (92,5%)	$1,845,501
October 25	Phoenix	United States	Footprint Center	Teezo Touchdown	29,312 / 29,312 (100%)	$3,737,225
October 26	Phoenix	United States	Footprint Center	Teezo Touchdown	29,312 / 29,312 (100%)	$3,737,225
October 29	Las Vegas	United States	MGM Grand Garden Arena	Teezo Touchdown	10,312 / 11,423 (90,27%)	$1,464,624
October 31	Oakland	United States	Oakland Arena	Teezo Touchdown	31,184 / 31,184 (100%)	$3,981,574
November 1	Oakland	United States	Oakland Arena	Teezo Touchdown	31,184 / 31,184 (100%)	$3,981,574
November 5	Inglewood	United States	SoFi Stadium	Teezo Touchdown	49,735 / 49,735 (100%)	$7,941,151
November 8	Seattle	United States	Climate Pledge Arena	Teezo Touchdown	15,903 / 15,903 (100%)	$2,440,315
November 10	Vancouver	Canada	Rogers Arena	Teezo Touchdown	16,401 / 16,401 (100%)	$2,107,129
November 12	Portland	United States	Moda Center	Teezo Touchdown	15,599 / 15,748 (99%)	$1,974,532
November 15	Salt Lake City	United States	Delta Center	Teezo Touchdown	13,740 / 13,740 (100%)	$1,756,616
November 18	Tulsa	United States	BOK Center	Teezo Touchdown	13,924 / 16,951 (82%)	$1,801,301
November 21	Austin	United States	Moody Center	Teezo Touchdown	22,089 / 22,089 (100%)	$3,157,157
November 22	Austin	United States	Moody Center	Teezo Touchdown	22,089 / 22,089 (100%)	$3,157,157
November 27	Miami	United States	Kaseya Center	Teezo Touchdown	17,340 / 17,340 (100%)	$2,769,317
December 1	Atlanta	United States	State Farm Arena	Teezo Touchdown	29,779 / 29,779 (100%)	$4,116,231
December 2	Atlanta	United States	State Farm Arena	Teezo Touchdown	29,779 / 29,779 (100%)	$4,116,231
December 4	Nashville	United States	Bridgestone Arena	Teezo Touchdown	12,823 / 14,862 (86,28%)	$1,630,072
December 6	Baltimore	United States	CFG Bank Arena	Teezo Touchdown	10,881 / 10,881 (100%)	$1,545,411
December 8	Pittsburgh	United States	PPG Paints Arena	Teezo Touchdown	14,734 / 15,273 (96,47%)	$1,720,398
December 10	Philadelphia	United States	Wells Fargo Center	Teezo Touchdown	18,018 / 18,018 (100%)	$2,723,762
December 12	Detroit	United States	Little Caesars Arena	Teezo Touchdown	18,539 / 18,539 (100%)	$2,577,035
December 18	Brooklyn	United States	Barclays Center	Teezo Touchdown	32,118 / 32,118 (100%)	$3,757,972
December 19	Brooklyn	United States	Barclays Center	Teezo Touchdown	32,118 / 32,118 (100%)	$3,757,972
December 21	New York City	United States	Madison Square Garden	Teezo Touchdown	17,703 / 17,703 (100%)	$3,533,062
December 23	Boston	United States	TD Garden	Teezo Touchdown	31,583 / 32,423 (Note: Attendance and Revenue combined with the attendance and revenue from December 23, 2023 and January 12, 2024.) (97,4%)	$4,572,513
December 26	Newark	United States	Prudential Center	Teezo Touchdown	16,576 / 16,576 (100%)	$2,734,071
December 29	Toronto	Canada	Scotiabank Arena	Teezo Touchdown	17,697 / 17,697 (100%)	$2,575,312

List of 2024 concerts
Date (2024)	City	Country	Venue	Opening act	Attendance	Revenue
January 3 (Note: Originally scheduled to take place on December 15, 2023.)	Chicago	United States	United Center	Don Toliver; Chase B	35,249 / 35,249 (Note: Attendance and Revenue combined with the attendance and revenue from January 3 and 22, 2024.) (100%)	$5,715,798
January 6	Toronto	Canada	Scotiabank Arena		17,968 / 17,968 (100%)	$2,504,421
January 9	Montreal	Canada	Bell Centre		19,634 / 19,634 (100%)	$2,358,001
January 12	Boston	United States	TD Garden	Sheck Wes	15,832 / 16,219 (97,6%)	$2,158,045
January 14	University Park	United States	Bryce Jordan Center		9,248 / 11,455 (80,7%)	$1,355,983
January 17	Milwaukee	United States	Fiserv Forum	Veeze; Skilla Baby; Babyface Ray	9,181 / 10,322 (88,95%)	$915,975
January 20	St. Paul	United States	Xcel Energy Center	Veeze; Skilla Baby; Babyface Ray	9,532 / 11,630 (81,96 %)	$1,262,115
January 22	Chicago	United States	United Center	Veeze; Skilla Baby; Babyface Ray		
January 24	Columbus	United States	Schottenstein Center	Veeze; Skilla Baby; Babyface Ray	9,984 / 12,364 (80,75%)	$1,474,658
January 28	Miami	United States	Kaseya Center	Veeze; Skilla Baby; Babyface Ray	15,891 / 15,891 (100%)	$2,749,623
January 31	Orlando	United States	Kia Center	Veeze; Skilla Baby; Babyface Ray	14,279 / 16,156 (88,38%)	$1,536,262
June 28	Arnhem	Netherlands	GelreDome		52,467 / 54,162 (96,87%)	$4,855,422
June 30	Arnhem	Netherlands	GelreDome	Chase B	52,467 / 54,162 (96,87%)	$4,855,422
July 2	Kraków	Poland	Tauron Arena	Yung Lean	15,330 / 15,975 (95,96%)	$1,790,827
July 5	Zurich	Switzerland	Hallenstadion	Yung Lean	13,760 / 14,000 (98,29%)	$2,328,488
July 6	Nice	France	Allianz Riviera	Yung Lean	34,169 / 34,169 (100%)	$4,087,799
July 9	Antwerp	Belgium	Sportpaleis	Yung Lean	19,664 / 19,664 (100%)	$2,416,656
July 11	London	England	Tottenham Hotspur Stadium	Yung Lean	46,963 / 46,963 (100%)	$6,548,419
July 13	Manchester	England	Co-op Live	Yung Lean	16,291 / 16,291 (100%)	$2,601,476
July 16	Hamburg	Germany	Barclays Arena	Yung Lean	12,900 / 12,900 (100%)	$1,525,810
July 18	Prague	Czech Republic	O2 Arena	Yung Lean	15,765 / 16,128 (97,75%)	$1,679,830
July 20	Cologne	Germany	RheinEnergieStadion	Yung Lean	42,068 / 42,068 (100%)	$4,857,788
July 23	Milan	Italy	Ippodromo Snai La Maura	Yung Lean	79,896 / 79,896 (100%)	$7,041,329
July 26	Frankfurt	Germany	Deutsche Bank Park	Yung Lean	88,911 / 88,911 (100%)	$9,768,417
July 27	Frankfurt	Germany	Deutsche Bank Park	Yung Lean	88,911 / 88,911 (100%)	$9,768,417
July 30	Madrid	Spain	WiZink Center	Yung Lean	28,674 / 31,853 (90,02%)	$4,638,537
July 31	Madrid	Spain	WiZink Center	Yung Lean	28,674 / 31,853 (90,02%)	$4,638,537
August 2	Lisbon	Portugal	MEO Arena	Yung Lean	53,354 / 57,400 (92,95%)	$4,804,711
August 3	Lisbon	Portugal	MEO Arena	Yung Lean	53,354 / 57,400 (92,95%)	$4,804,711
August 4	Lisbon	Portugal	MEO Arena	Yung Lean	53,354 / 57,400 (92,95%)	$4,804,711
September 7	Santiago	Chile	Estadio Municipal de La Florida	Pablo Chill-E	18,537 / 26,348 (70%)	$1,775,882
September 9	Buenos Aires	Argentina	Movistar Arena		12,200 / 12,834 (95%)	$1,963,998
September 11	São Paulo	Brazil	Allianz Parque		42,200 / 44,313 (95%)	$4,208,054
September 13 (Note: As part of Rock in Rio.)	Rio de Janeiro	Brazil	Barra Olympic Park		—	—
September 15	Bogotá	Colombia	Coliseo MedPlus		17,081 / 19,140 (89%)	$1,314,917
September 18	San Juan	Puerto Rico	Coliseo de Puerto Rico		11,739 / 13,984 (84%)	$1,422,085
September 21	Mexico City	Mexico	Azteca Stadium Terrace		62,276 / 85,072 (73%)	$4,930,077
September 22	Mexico City	Mexico	Azteca Stadium Terrace		62,276 / 85,072 (73%)	$4,930,077
October 9	East Rutherford	United States	MetLife Stadium		61,728 / 61,728 (100%)	$8,676,707
October 17	Sydney	Australia	Allianz Stadium		79,572 / 79,572 (100%)	$10,460,353
October 18	Sydney	Australia	Allianz Stadium		79,572 / 79,572 (100%)	$10,460,353
October 22	Melbourne	Australia	Marvel Stadium		115,347 / 115,347 (100%)	$12,556,215
October 23	Melbourne	Australia	Marvel Stadium		115,347 / 115,347 (100%)	$12,556,215
October 26	Brisbane	Australia	Suncorp Stadium		47,723 / 47,723 (100%)	$6,150,714
October 30	Auckland	New Zealand	Eden Park		41,120 / 47,195 (87%)	$3,052,019
Total					1,206,441	$154,675,831

List of 2025 concerts
Date (2025)	City	Country	Venue	Opening act	Attendance	Revenue
April 11-13 (Note: Part of Coachella.)	Indio	United States	Empire Polo Club			
April 18-20 (Note: Part of Coachella.)	Indio	United States	Empire Polo Club			
May 11	Barcelona	Spain	Tres Xemeneies			
May 16	Doha	Qatar	Ahmad bin Ali Stadium			
August 22 (Note: Part of Leeds Festival.)	Leeds	England	Bramham Park			
August 24 (Note: Part of Reading Festival.)	Reading	England	Little John's Farm			
October 11	Johannesburg	South Africa	FNB Stadium	Young Stunna		
October 18	Delhi	India	Jawaharlal Nehru Stadium			
October 19	Delhi	India	Jawaharlal Nehru Stadium			
October 25	Goyang (Note: Promoted as Seoul.)	South Korea	Goyang Stadium			
October 29	Macao	China	Macao Outdoor Performance Venue			
November 1	Sanya	China	Sanya Sports Stadium			
November 8	Tokorozawa (Note: Promoted as Tokyo.)	Japan	Belluna Dome			
November 15	Abu Dhabi	United Arab Emirates	Etihad Park			
November 19	Mumbai	India	Mahalaxmi Racecourse			
Total					-	-

== Canceled shows ==
List of canceled concerts, showing date, city, country, venue, and reason for cancellation
Date	City	Country	Venue	Reason
October 14, 2023	Raleigh	United States	PNC Arena	Unknown
November 13, 2023	Portland	United States	Moda Center	Unknown
January 3, 2024	Louisville	United States	KFC Yum! Center	Unknown
