= Circus Maximus (song) =

2023 song by Travis Scott featuring the Weeknd and Swae Lee

Song by Travis Scott featuring the Weeknd and Swae Lee

from the album Utopia
- Released: July 28, 2023
- Recorded: 2022
- Studio: Abbey Road (London); Miraval (Correns)
- Genre: Industrial hip hop; alternative R&B
- Length: 4:18
- Label: Cactus Jack; Epic
- Songwriters: Jacques Webster II; Abel Tesfaye; Khalif Brown; Noah Goldstein; Jahaan Sweet; Michael Dean
- Producers: Travis Scott; Goldstein; Sweet (add.); Mike Dean (add.)

"Circus Maximus" is a song by American rapper and singer Travis Scott featuring Canadian singer-songwriter the Weeknd and fellow American rapper and singer Swae Lee from the former's fourth studio album Utopia (2023). The song was produced by Scott and Noah Goldstein, with additional production from Jahaan Sweet and Mike Dean. It was preceded by Scott's debut film of the same name; a visual accompaniment to the album released the day prior.

== Background ==
"Circus Maximus" uses the same style of drums that were used on "Black Skinhead" by Kanye West. Scott also uses the same rapping style for that song: "A walkin' distraction / I'm naturally Black and / Unnaturally breathin' / Like a waist that is snatchin'". Mike Dean was also involved in the production of both songs, which might be a possible reason for the samples that Scott chose for Utopia.

== Critical reception ==
The song received generally mixed reviews. Complex's Jordan Rose saw the resemblance of the song to "Black Skinhead" but deemed it one of the worst things of Utopia as he felt that the album was influenced by Kanye West too much. Tom Breihan of Stereogum also acknowledged the influence but felt that "Kanye West was always interesting", but "Travis Scott is simply not". Shaad D'Souza of The Guardian opined that it "dampens the pummelling qualities of the older song, and although Scott does sound a great deal like West, he feels like a void at the centre of the song, lacking the supernova intensity required to anchor such a darkly toned, militant track".

Mackenzie Cummings-Grady of Billboard ranked it as the tenth best song from Utopia.

== Live performances ==
The Weeknd performed "Circus Maximus" with an extension to his chorus in the Latin American leg for his After Hours til Dawn Tour. It is unknown if the verse is scrapped from the song or made for his own live rendition.

Scott performed the song for the first time at the Circus Maximus on August 7, 2023, along with the rest of the tracks from Utopia. Later, the track was included in the setlist for Scott's Circus Maximus Tour.

== Charts ==
Chart performance for "Circus Maximus"
Chart (2023)	Peak position
Australia (ARIA)	49
Australia Hip Hop/R&B (ARIA)	23
Canada Hot 100 (Billboard)	32
Czech Republic Singles Digital (ČNS IFPI)	52
France (SNEP)	57
Global 200 (Billboard)	32
Greece International (IFPI)	65
Italy (FIMI)	61
Lithuania (AGATA)	60
Poland (Polish Streaming Top 100)	48
Portugal (AFP)	48
Slovakia Singles Digital (ČNS IFPI)	29
Sweden Heatseeker (Sverigetopplistan)	10
UK Audio Streaming (Official Charts)	87
US Billboard Hot 100	36
US Hot R&B/Hip-Hop Songs (Billboard)	19

== Certifications ==
Certifications for "Circus Maximus"
Region	Certification	Certified units/sales
Brazil (Pro-Música Brasil)	Gold	20,000^{‡}
Canada (Music Canada)	Gold	40,000^{‡}
United States (RIAA)	Gold	500,000^{‡}
^{‡} Sales+streaming figures based on certification alone.
