= Utopia (Travis Scott album) =

Studio album by Travis Scott
- Released: July 28, 2023
- Recorded: August 2019 – July 2023
- Studios: Shangri-La (California); Miraval (Correns); Island Sound (Honolulu); Mercedes-Benz Stadium (Atlanta); Abbey Road (London)
- Genre: Hip-hop
- Length: 73:27
- Labels: Cactus Jack; Epic
- Producers: 30 Roc; The Alchemist; Allen Ritter; Bnyx; Boi-1da; BoogzDaBeast; Buddy Ross; Cadenza; Dez Wright; Dom Maker; FnZ; Guy-Manuel de Homem-Christo; Illangelo; Jahaan Sweet; James Blake; Justin Vernon; Metro Boomin; Nami; Nik Dean; Noah Goldstein; Oz; Scotty Coleman; Sevn Thomas; Slim Pharoah; Tay Keith; Travis Sayles; Travis Scott; Vegyn; Vinylz; Wheezy; WondaGurl; Ye

Travis Scott chronology
JackBoys (2019)	Utopia (2023)	JackBoys 2 (2025)

Alternate covers
- Four alternate covers

Singles from Utopia
- 1. "K-pop" Released: July 21, 2023; 2. "Delresto (Echoes)" Released: July 28, 2023; 3. "Meltdown" Released: August 15, 2023; 4. "I Know ?" Released: September 26, 2023; 5. "Fein" Released: March 12, 2024

Utopia is the fourth studio album by American rapper Travis Scott. It was released through Cactus Jack and Epic Records on July 28, 2023. The album features guest appearances from Teezo Touchdown, Drake, Playboi Carti, Beyoncé, Rob49, 21 Savage, the Weeknd, Swae Lee, Yung Lean, Dave Chappelle, Young Thug, Westside Gunn, Kid Cudi, Bad Bunny, SZA, Future, and James Blake. Physical releases of the album feature additional guest appearances from Lil Uzi Vert and Sheck Wes.

Production was handled by a variety of record producers, including Scott and Blake themselves, WondaGurl, Kanye West (credited as Ye), Allen Ritter, Guy-Manuel de Homem-Christo, Wheezy, Buddy Ross, Vegyn, 30 Roc, Jahaan Sweet, Boi-1da, Vinylz, Tay Keith, Bnyx, Oz, Justin Vernon, the Alchemist, Dom Maker, Illangelo, DVLP, and Metro Boomin, among others. The album serves as the follow-up to Scott's third studio album, Astroworld (2018), as well as JackBoys (2019), his compilation album that was released in collaboration with Cactus Jack. It is a concept record that was accompanied by a film titled Circus Maximus, which was released the day before the album.

Utopia divided reviewers, with some critics praising its appeal and production, while others criticized its lack of cohesion and excessive familiarity to West's works. It debuted at number one on Billboard 200 chart, in which it earned 496,000 album-equivalent units, of which 252,000 units were pure album sales. All 19 songs from the album debuted in the Billboard Hot 100, making Scott the 15th artist in the chart's history to log 100-plus career entries. Commercially, the album became Scott's first number one album in the United Kingdom, also reaching the top in Australia, Canada, Ireland, Italy, the Netherlands, New Zealand, Norway, and Sweden. The album was supported by five singles: "K-pop", "Delresto (Echoes)", "Meltdown", "I Know ?", and "Fein".

== Background and recording ==
On July 8, 2020, Scott first revealed the title of the album when he posted a picture on Instagram with its name, which would later be revealed to be the title. On August 3, 2020, he further teased the title of the album in a thank you letter to fans on the second anniversary of his third studio album, Astroworld (2018). In October, Scott continued to tease the album in a series of tweets. Recording for the album began in 2019 with Scott posting updates throughout recording sessions on social media.

In a February 2021 interview with i-D, Scott said he had been collaborating with new artists while attempting to expand his sound and making songs on his own instrumentals that he had created. In May 2021, record producer and audio engineer Mike Dean stated that Scott was recording music that was alike to that from his debut mixtape, Owl Pharaoh (2013), for Utopia. In an interview with Women's Wear Daily in June, Scott described the sound of Utopia, stating that he is "in this new album mode where it's like psychedelic rock". In February 2023, Scott revealed at the 2023 NBA All-Star weekend event in Salt Lake City that Utopia would be released after Don Toliver, Sheck Wes, and SoFaygo, who are his artists signed to Cactus Jack Records, would release their respective projects.

== Release and promotion ==
On August 2, 2022, Scott announced a one-week-long residency in the Zouk Nightclub in Las Vegas, known as the Road to Utopia from September 17 to 24. In December, it was reported that the album and a world tour would be scheduled for early 2023.

In May 2023, photos of Scott wearing an unreleased Air Jordan 1 Low shoe with the presumed Utopia logo and his bodyguard holding a Utopia labelled briefcase surfaced online. Record producer and audio engineer Mike Dean also shared his involvement in completing the record with an Instagram post later that day. On June 15, 2023, Scott was seen leaving Abbey Road Studios with his bodyguards, recreating the cover art for the Beatles' eleventh studio album, Abbey Road (1969). On June 27, Scott updated his website with the Utopia logo and a decoded pre-order link. Shortly after, new Utopia billboards began to appear across Los Angeles featuring a clock and a lock that fans speculated at a July 21, 2023, release date.

On July 9, 2023, Scott shared videos linked to Utopia on social media, including one in which he can be seen working on the project with Rick Rubin. Following the announcement, an insider told Complex that a release date for the album had not yet been confirmed. Scott updated his website again to share tickets for the event, pre-order links, CDs, vinyl records, and merchandise. On July 22, in Miami, Florida, during his headlining performance at Rolling Loud, Scott said that the performance would be the last time he performed the setlist from the Astroworld era and that Utopia will be released alongside a film called Circus Maximus six days later. The film featured segments directed by Nicolas Winding Refn, Harmony Korine, Gaspar Noé, Valdimar Jóhannsson, Kahlil Joseph, and Scott himself. On July 25, Scott tweeted out Utopia's release date of July 28, 2023, and revealed the trailer for Circus Maximus, which would have an AMC Theatres premiere the night before Utopia. The following day, Metrograph reported they were invited to a private screening. The same day, Utopia totems were found in Utopia, Texas, playing a siren-like sound. Scott posted four alternative cover arts with different versions to his Instagram profile in the days leading up to its release.

== Live events ==
On July 9, 2023, Scott announced a launch event for Utopia scheduled to be livestreamed from the Pyramids of Giza on July 28. On July 17, 2023, rumors circulated that the Musicians' Syndicate of Egypt released a statement, claiming that due to "information about peculiar rituals performed by the star during his performance, contradicting our authentic societal values and traditions, the Syndicate's president and board of directors have decided to cancel the license issued for hosting this type of concert, which goes against the cultural identity of the Egyptian people." However, Scott's manager, David Stormberg, confirmed that the articles that stated that the concert was cancelled were fake. Live Nation, the concert's promoter, would also come with a statement citing such articles as false and that the show would continue as is.

On July 26, Live Nation Middle East revealed that the launch party at the Pyramids of Giza would be canceled due to problems with the construction in the desert, to which Scott responded in a series of tweets that he was looking for a new date and would be hosting four more listening parties for Utopia. The day of the release of the album, Scott announced a concert in Pompeii, Italy, coming soon. On August 1, 2023, the rapper announced "Circus Maximus", a concert at the Circus Maximus in Rome, Italy, as replacement show for the canceled Pyramids of Giza concert, for August 7, 2023.

On August 29, 2023, Scott announced the Circus Maximus Tour, starting on October 11, 2023, in Charlotte at Spectrum Center and concluding on December 29, 2023, in Toronto at Scotiabank Arena. On November 10, 2023, Scott announced the second leg of the tour, starting on January 3, 2024, in Louisville at KFC Yum! Center and concluding on January 31, 2024, in Orlando at Amway Center.

== Songs ==
In June 2021, Scott appeared on the Cactus Jack for Dior Summer 2022 show in which two new songs were played, "In My Head" and "Lost Forever", which feature fellow American rappers Swae Lee and Westside Gunn, respectively, but the former song did not appear on Utopia. In August 2021, Scott signed a picture deal with A24 and teased his own film based on the album. On August 6, 2022, Scott performed at the O2 Arena in London that weekend, where he performed the song "God's Country", which was Kanye West's song that was originally supposed to appear on his tenth studio album, Donda (2021), but it is speculated that West had given the song to Scott for him to use for Utopia.

In May 2023, Scott unveiled a preview of "K-pop", a collaboration with Puerto Rican rapper and singer Bad Bunny and Canadian singer the Weeknd, and was released as the lead single from Utopia on July 21, 2023. Later that month, the songs "Gold Blackberry" and an early version of "Til Further Notice" leaked on May 11, 2023, with the instrumental for Gold Blackberry previously used for the Travis Scott Air Jordan 1 Low Reverse collaboration ad and later for a Nike Attack collaboration advertisement, but Gold Blackberry did not appear on the album. That same month, Scott reportedly played songs from the record for the Houston Astros, and revealed that the record was in its mastering stage. "Delresto (Echoes)", a collaboration with American singer Beyoncé, was released through her imprint Parkwood Entertainment as the second single from the album alongside its release July 28, 2023. "Meltdown", featuring Canadian rapper Drake, was also released as a single alongside the album and debuted at number three on the Billboard Hot 100. "Fein", the album's eighth track, a collaboration with American rapper Playboi Carti debuted at number five on the Hot 100, while the album's tenth track "I Know ?" debuted at number 11. "I Know ?" was sent to US rhythmic radio on September 26, 2023, as the album's fourth single. "Fein" was sent to US rhythmic radio on March 12, 2024, as the album's fifth single.

== Critical reception ==
Professional ratings
Aggregate scores
Source	Rating
AnyDecentMusic?	6.2/10
Metacritic	67/100
Review scores
Source	Rating
AllMusic	4/5 stars
American Songwriter	4.5/5 stars
Clash	9/10
The Guardian	2/5 stars
HipHopDX	2.4/5
MusicOMH	4/5 stars
NME	3/5 stars
Pitchfork	5.7/10
RapReviews	7/10
Slant Magazine	3.5/5 stars

Utopia was met with generally positive reviews. At Metacritic, which assigns a rating out of 100 to reviews from professional publications, the album received a weighted average score of 67, based on 13 reviews. Aggregator AnyDecentMusic? gave it 6.2 out of 10, based on their assessment of the critical consensus.

American Songwriter's Thomas Galindo wrote that the album is "a terrific thing" and "a much-needed thing for hip-hop", complimenting Scott for staying "true to his style, his preferences, and his principles, [and] going against the grain of the tendencies in the viral-hungry world that is 2023 rap". Robin Murray of Clash gave the album a score of 9 out of 10, appreciating it for "its daring, bravado, and continual rule-breaking", writing that "Utopia isn't built through boasts – there's a sense of evolution, of a voice chafing against the barriers we erect in our lives". Ben Devlin of MusicOMH praised the album, stating, "The Texan auteur might have had a bumpy start to the 2020s, but his fourth album sees him doing what he does best". RapReviews critic Michael G. Barilleaux said, "Nevertheless, while it's difficult to get past the wording of Travis Scott's Astroworld follow up, the instrumental completeness and overall energy is difficult to forget". Publication AllMusic said, "There are experiments with ambience, risky beat switches, theatrical and hook-free pop, and orchestration that Scott has never attempted before. The multi-platinum guest features might set the album up for global conquest, but the most exciting moments come when it sounds like Scott is discovering a new way to push his craft forward". Paul Attard of Slant Magazine remarked that the album "operates less as a cohesive body of work and more as a series of show-stopping set pieces" with "cluttered middle section where it slowly starts to feel as if Scott has lost the thread within". The critic stated that the rapper "seems less concerned with what he's saying than with the emotion and feeling his music conveys. [...] Few in today's hip-hop landscape can truly be considered an auteur the way Scott is". HotNewHipHop criticized the album's lack of cohesion and excessive familiarity, stating "the numerous reference points to Kanye West, (..) blurs the line between paying homage, calling back to the early phases of his career, and recycling ideas." Rolling Stone said "There's just not enough substance, though. That's not a new knock on Scott. But the expectation of subpar lyricism doesn't absolve him from criticism; if he didn't want to be called out for bland bars, he could simply produce compilation albums like Metro Boomin or DJ Khaled."

Alphonse Pierre of Pitchfork described Utopia as "a shiny, empty spectacle loaded with pop superstars who rarely make an impact" and felt that its "global ambitions sacrifice that little bit of realness he had left" as Scott "waters down the cutting-edge sounds of the past and, in the process, flattens his Southerness to the point that he feels like he's from nowhere". Nathan Evans of NME reflected on Kanye West's influence on the album, writing that "Scott steps back into the gargantuan shadow of his mentor. [West] is not just an inspiration but an apparition that looms over Scott's identity on this album". Evans also stated that the rapper "sounds maddened by the pursuit of finding that vague world" looking for "the spectrum to enlist pop superstars, trap's A-Team, electronic mavens and alternative heroes". Reviewing the album for The Guardian, Shaad D'Souza stated, "He's a canny grounding force, and has a sharp ear for bringing together seemingly disparate ingredients. Utopia could have used more of that sure hand". Vivian Medithi of HipHopDX said, "Utopia is more boring than Travis Scott".

=== Year-end lists ===
Select year-end rankings of Utopia
Critic/Publication	List	Rank	Ref.
Billboard	The 50 Best Albums of 2023	21	
Billboard	The 20 Best Rap Albums of 2023	10	
Complex	The Best Albums of 2023	3	
Hot Press	50 Best Albums of 2023	43	
Rap-Up	10 Best Rap Albums of 2023	2	

=== Industry awards ===
Awards and nominations for Utopia
Year	Ceremony	Category	Result	Ref.
2023	Billboard Music Awards	Top Rap Album	Nominated	
2024	Grammy Awards	Best Rap Album	Nominated	

== Commercial performance ==
In the United States, Utopia debuted at number one on Billboard 200 chart, earning 496,000 album-equivalent units (including 252,000 in pure album sales) in its first week. This became Scott's fourth album to top the chart and the third that he was credited for. The album also accumulated a total of 330.68 million on-demand streams of the album's songs. All 19 songs from the album debuted in the Billboard Hot 100, making Scott the 15th artist in the chart's history to log over 100 career entries.

In United Kingdom, Utopia debuted at number one of the UK Albums Chart, becoming Scott's first album to achieve it. It also earned the biggest streaming week in 2023 for an album in the country. The album also topped the Irish Albums Chart. In Australia, Utopia became Scott's second studio album to debut at number one on the ARIA Albums Chart, after Astroworld (2018). In addition eighteen tracks from the album debuted on the ARIA Singles Chart, including "Meltdown" at number six.

== Track listing ==
Utopia track listing
No.	Title	Writer(s)	Producer(s)	Length
1.	"Hyaena"	Jacques Webster II; Ebony Oshunrinde; Mike Dean; Jahaan Sweet; Noah Goldstein; Andy Votel; Derek Shulman; Ray Shulman; Kerry Minnear; George Clinton; Edward Hazel	Travis Scott; WondaGurl^{[b]}; M. Dean^{[b]}; Sweet^{[b]}; Goldstein^{[b]}	3:42
2.	"Thank God"	J. Webster; Mark Mbogo; Stormi Webster; Ye; Allen Ritter; Michael Mulé; Isaac de Boni; Oshunrinde; Jahmal Gwin	Travis Scott; Ye; Ritter; FnZ; WondaGurl; BoogzDaBeast	3:04
3.	"Modern Jam" (featuring Teezo Touchdown)	J. Webster; Aaron Thomas; Guy-Manuel de Homem-Christo; M. Dean; Sweet	Travis Scott; de Homem-Christo; Sweet^{[b]}; M. Dean^{[b]}	4:15
4.	"My Eyes"	J. Webster; Dua Saleh; Sampha Sisay; Justin Vernon; Wesley Glass; Buddy Ross; Joseph Thornalley; Oshunrinde	Travis Scott; Vernon; Wheezy; Buddy Ross; Vegyn; WondaGurl	4:11
5.	"God's Country"	J. Webster; Ye; Samuel Gloade; Dez Wright	Travis Scott; 30 Roc; Wright	2:07
6.	"Sirens"	J. Webster; Goldstein; Ross; Evan Mast; John Fannon; Keith Kabwe; Isaac Mpofu; Sweet	Travis Scott; Goldstein^{[b]}; Ross^{[b]}; E*vax^{[b]}; John Mayer^{[b]}; WondaGurl^{[b]}	3:24
7.	"Meltdown" (featuring Drake)	J. Webster; Aubrey Graham; Matthew Samuels; Anderson Hernandez; Brytavious Chambers; Benjamin Saint-Fort; Scotty Coleman	Boi-1da; Vinylz; Tay Keith; Bnyx; Coleman; Skeleton Cartier^{[b]}	4:06
8.	"Fein" (featuring Playboi Carti)	J. Webster; Jordan Carter; Khadimou Fall; Sweet	Travis Scott; Sweet^{[b]}	3:11
9.	"Delresto (Echoes)" (featuring Beyoncé)	J. Webster; Beyoncé Knowles-Carter; James Litherland; Terius Gesteelde-Diamant; Chauncey Hollis; M. Dean; Ritter	Travis Scott; Beyoncé^{[a]}; Hit-Boy^{[b]}; M. Dean^{[b]}; Ritter^{[b]}	4:34
10.	"I Know ?"	J. Webster; Ozan Yildirim; Coleman; Ross; Kobe Hood; Terrance George	Travis Scott; Oz; Coleman; Derek "206" Anderson^{[b]}	3:31
11.	"Topia Twins" (featuring Rob49 and 21 Savage)	J. Webster; Robert Thomas; Shéyaa Abraham-Joseph; Cash Esmailian; Glass; Oliver Rodigan; Wright; Henri Velasco; Edwards; Douglas Ford	Travis Scott; Wheezy; Cadenza; Edwards^{[a]}; Wright^{[b]}; Velasco^{[b]}	3:43
12.	"Circus Maximus" (featuring the Weeknd and Swae Lee)	J. Webster; Abel Tesfaye; Khalif Brown; Goldstein; Sweet; M. Dean; Gary Klebe	Travis Scott; Goldstein; Sweet^{[b]}; M. Dean^{[b]}; WondaGurl^{[b]}	4:18
13.	"Parasail" (featuring Yung Lean and Dave Chappelle)	J. Webster; Jonatan Håstad; David Chappelle; Sweet; Goldstein; Ross; Thornalley; Anthony Ruiz	Travis Scott; Sweet; Goldstein; Ross; Vegyn; Anthro^{[a]}	2:34
14.	"Skitzo" (featuring Young Thug)	J. Webster; Jeffery Williams; Samuels; Sweet; Dylan Teixeira; Travis Sayles; Oshunrinde; Ford; Blue Miller; India Simpson; Nik Dean; Coleman; Slim Pharoah; Nami Ondas	Boi-1da; Sweet; Nami; Sayles; Sevn Thomas; N. Dean; Slim Pharoah; Coleman	6:06
15.	"Lost Forever" (featuring Westside Gunn)	J. Webster; Alvin Worthy; Alan Maman; Litherland; Ford; Elliott Baker; Dominic Maker	Travis Scott; The Alchemist; James Blake; Maker	2:43
16.	"Looove" (featuring Kid Cudi)	J. Webster; Scott Mescudi; Pharrell Williams	Travis Scott; Pharrell^{[b]}; Ross^{[b]}	3:46
17.	"K-pop" (featuring Bad Bunny and the Weeknd)	J. Webster; Benito Martínez; Tesfaye; Carlo Montagnese; Saint-Fort; Samuels; Sweet; Bigram Zayas	Illangelo; Bnyx; Boi-1da; Sweet; DVLP^{[a]}	3:05
18.	"Telekinesis" (featuring SZA and Future)	J. Webster; Solána Rowe; Nayvadius Cash; Gwin; Ye; Sweet; Nima Jahanbin; Paimon Jahanbin; Edgar Panford; Victory Boyd	Travis Scott; BoogzDaBeast; Ye^{[b]}; Sweet^{[b]}; Hudmo^{[b]}	5:53
19.	"Til Further Notice" (featuring James Blake and 21 Savage)	J. Webster; Litherland; Abraham-Joseph; Leland Wayne	James Blake; Metro Boomin	5:14
Total length:				73:27

Notes

- ^{^[a]} signifies a co-producer
- ^{^[b]} signifies an additional producer
- All songs are stylized in uppercase. For example, "Hyaena" is written as "HYAENA".
- "Thank God" features uncredited additional vocals from KayCyy, Teezo Touchdown, and Stormi Webster
- "My Eyes" features uncredited additional vocals from Sampha and Justin Vernon
- "Sirens" features uncredited additional vocals from Drake
- "Delresto (Echoes)" features uncredited additional vocals from Justin Vernon
- The initial vinyl and CD versions of the album included "Aye", taken from Lil Uzi Vert's third studio album, Pink Tape (2023), in place of "Meltdown"; it does not include Drake's vocals on "Sirens" and includes main vocals from Sheck Wes on "Fein".
- The names of the artists on the album were initially hidden on streaming services, but they were credited four days after it was released.

Sample credits

- "Hyaena" contains a sample from "Proclamation", written by Derek Shulman, Ray Shulman, and Kerry Minnear, as performed by Gentle Giant; and a sample from "Maggot Brain", written by George Clinton and Edward Hazel, as performed by Funkadelic.
- "Modern Jam" contains samples from an early demo version of "I Am a God", written and performed by Kanye West.
- "My Eyes" contains a sample from "Over There", written by Amber Bain, Phil Cook, and Justin Vernon, as performed by the Japanese House.
- "Sirens" contains a sample from "Explorer Suite", written by John Fannon, as performed by New England; and samples from "Nsunka Lwendo", written by Keith Kabwe and Isaac Mpofu, as performed by Amanaz.
- "Parasail" contains uncredited samples from "Drug Song", written and performed by Dave Bixby.
- "Skitzo" contains a sample from "Ready for Love", written by India Simpson and Blue Miller, as performed by India Arie.
- "Lost Forever" contains uncredited samples from "Don't Be So Nice", written and performed by Chuck Senrick.
- "Looove" contains uncredited samples from "Numbers on the Boards", written by Terrence Thornton, Don Cannon, Charles Njapa, Bunny Sigler, Kanye West, Shawn Carter, Chris Martin, Anthony King, and John Matthews, as performed by Pusha T.
- "Telekinesis" contains samples from "Arena — BPM 83", written by Nima Jahanbin and Paimon Jahanbin, as performed by Wallis Lane.

== Personnel ==
Musicians

- Travis Scott – vocals
- KayCyy – vocals (track 2)
- Teezo Touchdown – vocals (track 3)
- Sampha – vocals (track 4)
- Sheck Wes – vocals (track 8)
- Justin Vernon – vocals (track 9)
- James Blake – vocals (track 15)
- Giovanna Moraga – cello (track 18)
- Kaveri Rastegar – flute (track 18)
- Jenny Takamatsu – violin (track 18)
- Daphne Chen – violin (track 18)
- Marta Honer – violin (track 18)

Technical

- Mike Dean – mastering (all tracks), mixing (tracks 1–3, 6, 8, 9, 12, 15, 17)
- Caleb Laven – mixing (track 4), recording (tracks 1–4, 13, 17, 18)
- Derek "206" Anderson – mixing (track 10), recording (tracks 1–3, 5–10, 12, 13, 17, 18)
- Tom Elmhirst – mixing (tracks 4, 7, 13, 18, 19)
- Manny Marroquin – mixing (tracks 5, 10, 11, 14, 16)
- Travis Scott – recording (tracks 1–4, 11, 15, 16)
- Luis Bordeaux – recording (track 3)
- Stuart White – recording (track 9)
- Brandon Harding – recording (track 9)
- Alex Dowidchuk – recording (track 11)
- Josh Smith – recording (track 19)
- Ethan Stevens – recording (track 19)
- Adam Hong – engineering assistance (tracks 4, 13, 18, 19)
- Zach Pereyra – engineering assistance (tracks 5, 10, 11, 14, 16)
- Trey Station – engineering assistance (tracks 5, 10, 11, 14, 16)
- Anthony Vilchis – engineering assistance (tracks 5, 10, 11, 14, 16)
- Liv Painter – engineering assistance (track 18)

== Charts ==
=== Weekly charts ===
Weekly chart performance for Utopia
Chart (2023–2025)	Peak position
Australian Albums (ARIA)	1
Australian Hip Hop/R&B Albums (ARIA)	1
Austrian Albums (Ö3 Austria)	1
Belgian Albums (Ultratop Flanders)	3
Belgian Albums (Ultratop Wallonia)	1
Canadian Albums (Billboard)	1
Czech Albums (ČNS IFPI)	1
Danish Albums (Hitlisten)	1
Dutch Albums (Album Top 100)	1
Finnish Albums (Suomen virallinen lista)	1
French Albums (SNEP)	1
German Albums (Offizielle Top 100)	2
Hungarian Albums (MAHASZ)	1
Icelandic Albums (Tónlistinn)	1
Irish Albums (Official Charts)	1
Italian Albums (FIMI)	1
Japanese Combined Albums (Oricon)	48
Japanese Hot Albums (Billboard Japan)	56
Lithuanian Albums (AGATA)	2
New Zealand Albums (RMNZ)	1
Nigerian Albums (TurnTable Top 50)	9
Norwegian Albums (VG-lista)	1
Polish Albums (ZPAV)	2
Portuguese Albums (AFP)	9
Scottish Albums (Official Charts)	44
Slovak Albums (ČNS IFPI)	1
Spanish Albums (Promusicae)	2
Swedish Albums (Sverigetopplistan)	1
Swiss Albums (Schweizer Hitparade)	1
UK Albums (Official Charts)	1
UK R&B Albums (Official Charts)	3
US Billboard 200	1
US Top R&B/Hip-Hop Albums (Billboard)	1

=== Year-end charts ===
2023 year-end chart performance for Utopia
Chart (2023)	Position
Australian Albums (ARIA)	34
Austrian Albums (Ö3 Austria)	10
Belgian Albums (Ultratop Flanders)	53
Belgian Albums (Ultratop Wallonia)	36
Canadian Albums (Billboard)	16
Danish Albums (Hitlisten)	26
Dutch Albums (Album Top 100)	34
French Albums (SNEP)	51
German Albums (Offizielle Top 100)	31
Hungarian Albums (MAHASZ)	11
Icelandic Albums (Tónlistinn)	7
Italian Albums (FIMI)	22
New Zealand Albums (RMNZ)	32
Polish Albums (ZPAV)	32
Spanish Albums (PROMUSICAE)	88
Swiss Albums (Schweizer Hitparade)	2
UK Albums (OCC)	47
US Billboard 200	10
US Top R&B/Hip-Hop Albums (Billboard)	4

2024 year-end chart performance for Utopia
Chart (2024)	Position
Australian Albums (ARIA)	22
Australian Hip Hop/R&B Albums (ARIA)	3
Austrian Albums (Ö3 Austria)	4
Belgian Albums (Ultratop Flanders)	20
Belgian Albums (Ultratop Wallonia)	35
Canadian Albums (Billboard)	11
Danish Albums (Hitlisten)	29
Dutch Albums (Album Top 100)	17
French Albums (SNEP)	50
German Albums (Offizielle Top 100)	6
Global Albums (IFPI)	20
Hungarian Albums (MAHASZ)	11
Icelandic Albums (Tónlistinn)	13
Italian Albums (FIMI)	26
New Zealand Albums (RMNZ)	15
Polish Albums (ZPAV)	13
Swiss Albums (Schweizer Hitparade)	6
UK Albums (OCC)	58
US Billboard 200	16
US Top R&B/Hip-Hop Albums (Billboard)	4

2025 year-end chart performance for Utopia
Chart (2025)	Position
Australian Albums (ARIA)	70
Austrian Albums (Ö3 Austria)	48
Belgian Albums (Ultratop Flanders)	91
Belgian Albums (Ultratop Wallonia)	131
French Albums (SNEP)	123
German Albums (Offizielle Top 100)	70
Hungarian Albums (MAHASZ)	43
Swiss Albums (Schweizer Hitparade)	34
US Billboard 200	70
US Top R&B/Hip-Hop Albums (Billboard)	19

== Certifications ==
Certifications and sales for Utopia
Region	Certification	Certified units/sales
Australia (ARIA)	Gold	35,000^{‡}
Austria (IFPI Austria)	Platinum	15,000^{‡}
Brazil (Pro-Música Brasil)	2× Platinum	80,000^{‡}
Canada (Music Canada)	3× Platinum	240,000^{‡}
Denmark (IFPI Danmark)	Platinum	20,000^{‡}
France (SNEP)	Platinum	100,000^{‡}
Germany (BVMI)	Platinum	150,000^{‡}
Hungary (MAHASZ)	2× Platinum	8,000^{‡}
Iceland (FHF)	—	2,679
Italy (FIMI)	2× Platinum	100,000^{‡}
Netherlands (NVPI)	Gold	18,600^{‡}
New Zealand (RMNZ)	2× Platinum	30,000^{‡}
Poland (ZPAV)	3× Platinum	60,000^{‡}
Portugal (AFP)	Platinum	7,000^{‡}
Spain (Promusicae)	Gold	20,000^{‡}
Sweden (GLF)	Platinum	30,000^{‡}
United Kingdom (BPI)	Platinum	300,000^{‡}
United States (RIAA)	2× Platinum	2,000,000^{‡}
^{‡} Sales+streaming figures based on certification alone.
