= Fein (song) =

- Chase B remix cover

Single by Travis Scott featuring Playboi Carti

from the album Utopia
- Released: March 12, 2024
- Recorded: 2023
- Studio: Abbey Road (London); Miraval (Correns)
- Genre: Rage
- Length: 3:11
- Label: Cactus Jack; Epic
- Songwriters: Jacques Webster II; Jordan Carter; Khadimou Fall; Jahaan Sweet
- Producers: Travis Scott; Jahaan Sweet

Travis Scott singles chronology
"Née-Nah" (2024)	"Fein" (2024)	"Type Shit" (2024)

Playboi Carti singles chronology
"Carnival" (2024)	"Fein" (2024)	"Type Shit" (2024)

Music video
- "Fein" on YouTube

"Fein" (stylized as "FE!N") is a song by American rapper Travis Scott featuring fellow American rapper Playboi Carti. Produced by Scott, the song was written by the artists alongside additional producer Jahaan Sweet, and Sheck Wes, who has guest vocals on the original version of the song and the version shown in the movie Circus Maximus. It was originally released on July 28, 2023, as a track from his fourth studio album, Utopia, before later being sent to US rhythmic radio as the fifth single from the album on March 12, 2024.

"Fein" is a hip-hop song from the rage microgenre of trap music with an intense, fast-paced structure and beat. Lyrically, the song revolves around Scott and Carti's hedonistic activities and how their lives are shaped by a matter of it. Scott's repeated, high-pitch chanting of the word "fiend", a term for a person addicted to drugs, serves as the song's chorus. Carti was noted for displaying a new, Atlanta trap-style delivery on the song which he had been teasing as a new creative direction for him a year prior. His deep cadence on the song, in contrast to the "baby voice" which he had been known for at the time, received significant attention from listeners, several of whom initially assumed he was performing the high-pitched chorus.

The song received generally positive reception from music critics. Carti's performance divided critics, some of whom declared it the highlight of the track while others were less impressed. Commercially, "Fein" peaked at number five on the Billboard Hot 100, serving as Carti's second top-ten hit on the chart, and Scott's fourteenth. It also peaked within the top-10 of Canada, Australia and the United Kingdom's charts. Scott's performances of "Fein", many of which took place during his Circus Maximus Tour, have attracted attention for their intense energy and him repeating the song ten times in a row on multiple occasions. A music video for the song was released on March 30, 2024, featuring Scott and Carti performing in a void-like background with a 360-degree rotating camera.

== Background and recording ==
"Fein" was originally released on July 28, 2023, as the eighth track on Travis Scott's fourth studio album Utopia. It was later sent to US rhythmic radio on March 12, 2024, as the album's fifth single. Playboi Carti's feature on "Fein" serves as his third collaboration with Scott; he was previously featured on Scott's 2017 song "Green & Purple" while Scott appeared on "Love Hurts", a track on Carti's 2018 album Die Lit. Prior to the release of "Fein", fans had been anticipating a new direction from Carti in regards to his vocal performance. In an April 2022 interview with XXL, he stated that he would adopt a deeper voice on his next album. Later in April and May 2023, video snippets of a then-unreleased song, dubbed "All Red", were leaked online, featuring audio of Carti performing with a deeper cadence. During an interview with Complex in 2025, Scott described the origin and creation of "Fein" alongside Carti, saying:

The song was kind of finished. I just brought it when we were in the A. I remember we did a song before that, and before I left, I was like, "Well, I got this one joint I want to play. I'm thinking about putting it on my album. We'll see if you want to fuck with it." And when I played it, he was just going crazy. It's interesting, because every album, I have songs like this. Kind of like "Sicko Mode." I've always had those songs in the mind, where I keep them tucked. I really don't even play them for my homies. Maybe a couple of homies hear it, but they don’t ever see the full vision until I'm done with it. That was just one of those ones. It was crazy. He did his verse right there. And then when I went back, I was fucking with it, making it the song it is now. It was fucking crazy.

== Composition ==
"Fein" is 3 minutes and 11 seconds long. Scott wrote the song along with Jahaan Sweet, Playboi Carti and Sheck Wes. Scott is credited for producing the song, with additional production from Sweet, 206Derek handling recording and Mike Dean being responsible for its mixing and mastering. The song, which belongs to the rage microgenre of trap music, is centered around its fast-paced, energetic and intense beat. According to Gigwise, the song "focuses on themes of indulgence, excess, and the relentless pursuit of pleasure." The track features an alarm-like synth during the opening before Scott performs a titular chorus of the word "fiend", a term for a malignant entity and slang for someone with a crippling addiction, often to drugs and other substances. The chorus, described as hypnotic, represents Scott's addictive desire not just for drugs but for his fame-driven lifestyle. Scott demonstrates his message in lines such as "I've been focused on the future, never on right now" and "what I'm sippin' not kombucha, either pink or brown".

"Fein"
An 18-second audio sample of Playboi Carti's verse on "Fein". Carti uses an Atlanta-trap inspired flow and deep vocal delivery.

"Fein" features Carti performing a verse with a deeper voice and a flow inspired by Atlanta trap; a new vocal delivery in contrast to his signature "baby voice". Lyrically, Carti expands on the lifestyle presented by Scott with a dark edge, describing the paranoia which comes with it through lines such as "pistols all in the kitchen, can't give the zip code up". Carti's utilization of a deeper voice in contrast to Scott's high-pitched delivery of the chorus has been described as a trade in stylistic places between the artists; Neon Music viewed the twist as embodying the progression of their respective sounds. Many listeners initially perceived the chorus as being performed by Carti until the lyrics on the song's Genius page were verified by Scott himself.

Sheck Wes, a signee to Scott's Cactus Jack record label, provides ad-libs on the released version of the song. An alternate version of the song can be heard in Utopia’s accompanying film Circus Maximus, as well as on some physical editions of the album. This version features a full verse from Wes as well as an alternate vocal delivery from Carti.

== Reception ==
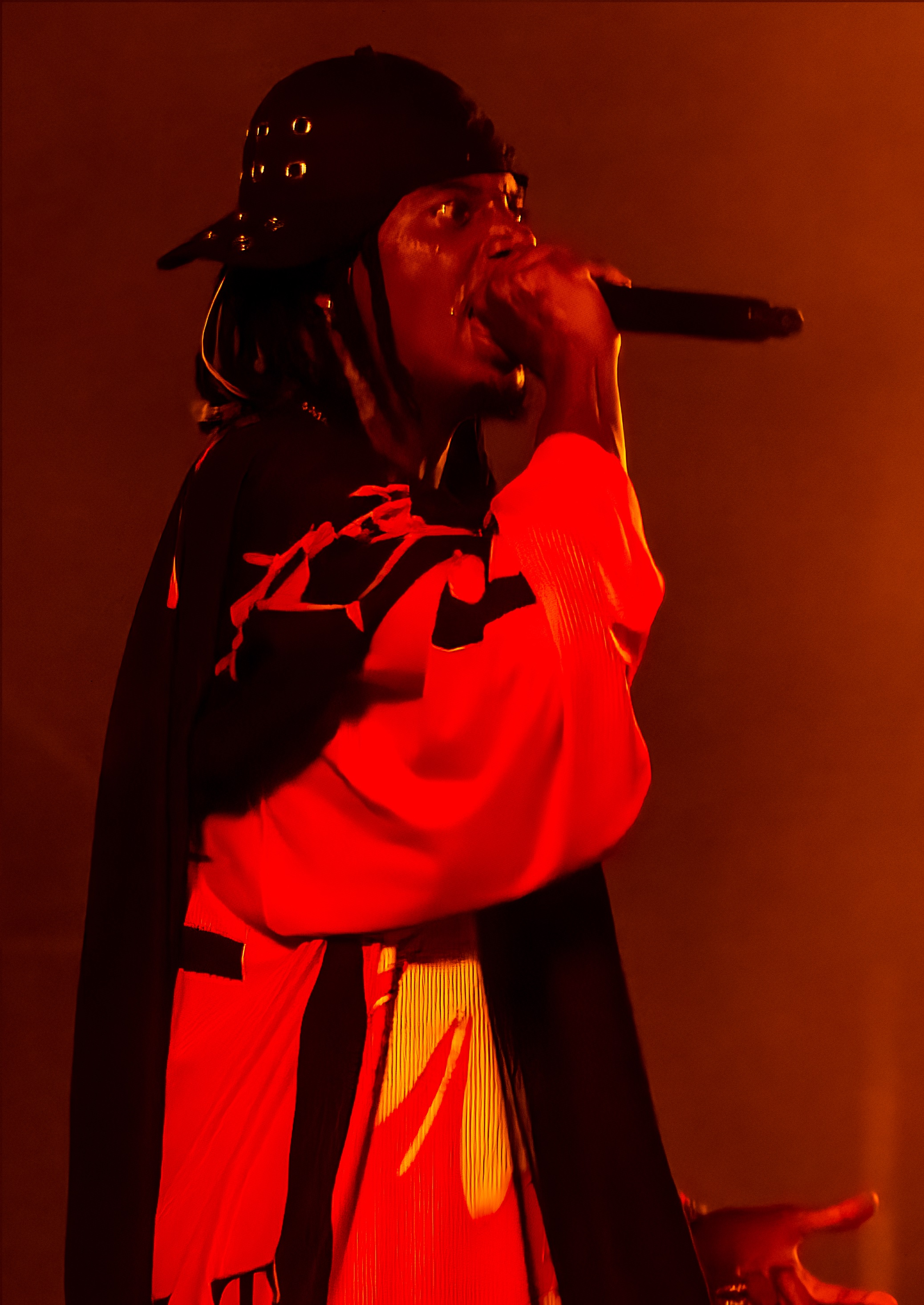
Playboi Carti was considered by many publications as the highlight of the song.

Complex's Eric Skelton considered "Fein" the best song from Utopia, while Ecleen Luzmila Caraballo considered it one of the best. Variety's Yousef Srour and Jem Aswad praised the collaborations in Utopia, citing Playboi Carti's new flow in the song as an example. Andre Gee of Rolling Stone commented the song has "the kind of beat that's good enough for Playboi Carti to repeat himself 182 times over." Desmond Leake of Paste wrote it "gives us a nice insight into the reclusive rapper's new sound, featuring the addictive refrain of 'Fein Fein' throughout the entire track." Casey Monroe of GigWise said that Carti's presence "complements Scott’s delivery, enhancing the track’s gritty atmosphere." In 2025, Complex described the song as a "clear and immediate highlight" from the album which "remains a playlist mainstay and fan-favorite from both artists’ discographies."

Pitchfork's Alphonse Pierre wrote that the song's beat is "played-out, but Playboi Carti's new vocal trick (sounding like he has bronchitis) soaks up the attention and just lets Travis do a bunch of ad-libbing." Similarly, Paul Attard of Slant Magazine stated that "'Fe!n,' despite its straight-up hallucinatory beat, contains the most dead air of any track here (as well as the worst guest spot in Playboi Carti, who sounds like he's suffering from bronchitis)." Nathan Evans of NME pointed out that Scott's line in the song "I've been focused on the future, never on right now" "exposes the fallacy" of Utopia, adding "By going back to the sound of his early work, Scott steps back into the gargantuan shadow of his mentor." Aron A. of HotNewHipHop said that Playboi Carti does not add anything exciting to the track, and despite his new style "the song itself isn't as memorable as the credits would otherwise suggest." Mackenzie Cummings-Grady of Billboard placed "Fein" last in her ranking of the songs from Utopia.

== Commercial performance ==
"Fein" debuted at number five on the Billboard Hot 100 in the first week of tracking for Utopia. It was the second highest-debuting song from the album, only behind "Meltdown" featuring Drake, which came in at number three. It served as Carti's highest-charting song at the time, and Scott's 14th top-ten appearance. On Billboard's Hot R&B/Hip-Hop Songs, the track debuted at number two. Outside of the United States, "Fein" reached a top ten position on the charts of several nations including the Canadian Hot 100, the ARIA Hip Hop/R&B Singles Chart and the UK Hip Hop/R&B Charts. By August 20, 2023, the song had accumulated over 75 million streams on Spotify.

By the time the song's music video released in March 2024, "Fein" was considered to be the most popular track off of Utopia. The song reached a new peak on the ARIA Hip Hop/R&B Singles Chart on October 28, gaining the number two position. On November 7, Spotify announced that "Fein" had reached 1 billion streams on its service. The song was Scott's sixth to reach the feat, and Carti's first.

== Live performances ==
Scott's live performances of the song have drawn an overall mixed reception. He performed most of the songs from Utopia for the first time, including "Fein", during his concert at the Circus Maximus in Rome on August 7, 2023. The event attracted media attention for triggering an approximately 1.3 magnitude artificial earthquake due to moshing from the crowd of nearly 60,000 people. Playboi Carti performed "Fein" for the first time on August 18 during a headlining show for Blockfest in Finland, where he was joined by Opium signee Destroy Lonely and a guitarist supporting the track.

During his Circus Maximus Tour set at the SoFi Stadium in California on November 5, Scott brought out Carti as they performed "Fein" for the first time together. Billboard labeled the performance "the show’s most riveting moment." At a Circus Maximus show in Tulsa, Oklahoma, on November 19, Scott performed "Fein" 10 consecutive times in a row. He did so again during a concert at Barclays Center in New York City on December 19. Scott explained his performance during an interview on The Tonight Show Starring Jimmy Fallon, saying: "Man, I have the best fans in the world and I go off the energy they give me, and they were wild that night, and so I just got even wilder."

Scott performed "Fein" alongside Carti, as well as "My Eyes" and "I Know ?", at the 66th Grammy Awards on February 4, 2024. The stage design for "Fein" was described as "post-apocalyptic", with Scott being surrounded by towers of black boxes and flames shooting through the stage, revealing a pit composed of speakers. During his verse, he shouted "they slept on me 10 times!", referencing the 10 times he had been nominated for a Grammy and lost, including that year's Best Rap Album, to which Utopia was nominated for but lost to Killer Mike's Michael. Scott then threw prop chairs to channel his aggression as Carti emerged and delivered his verse.

"Fein" was performed by Scott during his set on Saturday Night Live on March 30, 2024. Scott, dressed in a black leather shirt and pants over a white t-shirt, delivered the song behind a visual backdrop of a dark storm with lighting bolts and flames along with a smoke machine. After Scott performed the first half of the song, Playboi Carti, wearing a mask obscuring his face, emerged from the smoke and delivered his verse in a surprise unannounced appearance. The shaky camerawork, synced to the beat of the song and the rappers' movement, was a reference to the composition of the song's music video, which was released on the same day as the performance.

During his headlining performance at Rolling Loud in Miami on December 14, 2024, Scott brought out actor Owen Wilson onto the stage, where he shouted on a microphone "I'm feining (sic) for more!" before Scott began his performance of the song. During the performance, Wilson remained on stage and was seen bouncing up and down with his fists in the air.

== Music video ==
A music video for "Fein" was released on March 30, 2024, to Scott's YouTube channel via Vevo, the day he performed the song on SNL. The video, directed by Gabriel Moses, features Scott and Carti performing in a black backdrop while the camera makes continuous 360-degree rotations around them at a singular point. Other images featured in the video include a rodeo, a choir of children with bowl haircuts, a group of elderly women, a shirtless man with a shotgun, pole dancers, monks and sumo wrestlers.

=== Reception ===
HotNewHipHop writer Zachary Horvath believed that the video successfully captured the intensity of the song. Flisadam Pointer of Uproxx called the video "cinematic" and "an exciting watch". She further added that "Scott’s dramatic rotation and lively response make the video a visual representation of every rager’s deepest dark and dizzying fantasy brought to film." Within the first 24 hours of its release, the video amassed over 2.5 million views on YouTube. By mid-July, the video had gained over 45 million views.

=== Plagiarism allegation by director ===
On July 4, Gabriel Moses shared a screenshot of an anonymous tip via email on his Instagram story accusing Thai artist Lisa of imitating a scene from "Fein" in a video for her song "Rockstar". Moses commented "I got love for all my snitches man" and "Giving niggas till end of the month," while also posting the disputed clip. In the scene, the camera swiftly pans over people wearing white hoodies, similar to a scene in "Fein" where the camera quickly pans over children dressed in white. He further elaborated on Twitter on July 6 and claimed that "They [Lisa's team] reached out to my editor to work on this by the way & 'Fein' was the reference. He said no & they did it anyway. Enjoy the rest of your day." Lisa nor her team have not responded to the allegations.

== Remixes and samples ==
A version of the song remixed by Houston DJ and producer Chase B, a frequent collaborator of Scott, was released on April 19, 2024. The remix reworked the track into a dance record, limiting its lyrics and completely removing Playboi Carti's verse. The remix received poor reception from Scott's fans. On April 22, 2025, Killer Mike released a freestyle over the beat of "Fein" titled "Mania on My Mind".

"Fein" was announced as an official theme song for the WWE's WrestleMania 41. The song was played amid Scott's entrance during his appearance in the event.

The song was sampled and slightly remixed for the Call of Duty: Black Ops 7 Multiplayer reveal trailer on September 22, 2025.

== Charts ==
=== Weekly charts ===
Weekly chart performance for "Fein"
Chart (2023–2024)	Peak position
Australia (ARIA)	11
Australia Hip Hop/R&B (ARIA)	2
Austria (Ö3 Austria Top 40)	3
Belgium (Ultratop 50 Flanders)	39
Brazil Hot 100 (Billboard)	45
Canada Hot 100 (Billboard)	6
Croatia (Billboard)	15
Czech Republic Singles Digital (ČNS IFPI)	5
Denmark (Tracklisten)	22
Finland (Suomen virallinen lista)	33
France (SNEP)	11
Germany (GfK)	18
Global 200 (Billboard)	3
Greece International (IFPI)	5
Hungary (Single Top 40)	13
Iceland (Tónlistinn)	3
India International (IMI)	4
Israel (Mako Hitlist)	100
Ireland (IRMA)	14
Italy (FIMI)	39
Latvia Streaming (LaIPA)	1
Lithuania (AGATA)	7
Luxembourg (Billboard)	2
MENA (IFPI)	6
Netherlands (Single Top 100)	33
New Zealand (Recorded Music NZ)	6
Norway (VG-lista)	15
Poland (Polish Streaming Top 100)	3
Portugal (AFP)	8
Romania (Billboard)	5
South Africa Streaming (TOSAC)	5
Sweden (Sverigetopplistan)	52
Switzerland (Schweizer Hitparade)	1
UAE (IFPI)	12
UK Singles (Official Charts)	13
UK Hip Hop/R&B (Official Charts)	5
US Billboard Hot 100	5
US Hot R&B/Hip-Hop Songs (Billboard)	2
US Rhythmic Airplay (Billboard)	8

=== Year-end charts ===
2023 year-end chart performance for "Fein"
Chart (2023)	Position
US Hot R&B/Hip-Hop Songs (Billboard)	54

2024 year-end chart performance for "Fein"
Chart (2024)	Position
Australia (ARIA)	61
Australia Hip Hop/R&B (ARIA)	9
Austria (Ö3 Austria Top 40)	35
Canada (Canadian Hot 100)	84
France (SNEP)	169
Germany (GfK)	59
Global 200 (Billboard)	53
Hungary (Single Top 40)	94
Iceland (Tónlistinn)	33
India International (IMI)	7
Poland (Polish Streaming Top 100)	49
Portugal (AFP)	54
Switzerland (Schweizer Hitparade)	29
US Billboard Hot 100	97
US Hot R&B/Hip-Hop Songs (Billboard)	33
US Rhythmic (Billboard)	43

2025 year-end chart performance for "Fein"
Chart (2025)	Position
Global 200 (Billboard)	156

== Certifications ==
Certifications for "Fein"
Region	Certification	Certified units/sales
Australia (ARIA)	2× Platinum	140,000^{‡}
Belgium (BRMA)	Platinum	40,000^{‡}
Brazil (Pro-Música Brasil)	Diamond	160,000^{‡}
Canada (Music Canada)	4× Platinum	320,000^{‡}
Denmark (IFPI Danmark)	Gold	45,000^{‡}
France (SNEP)	Diamond	333,333^{‡}
Germany (BVMI)	Gold	300,000^{‡}
Hungary (MAHASZ)	Gold	2,000^{‡}
Italy (FIMI)	Platinum	100,000^{‡}
Mexico (AMPROFON)	Platinum+Gold	210,000^{‡}
New Zealand (RMNZ)	2× Platinum	60,000^{‡}
Poland (ZPAV)	2× Platinum	100,000^{‡}
Portugal (AFP)	2× Platinum	20,000^{‡}
Spain (Promusicae)	Gold	30,000^{‡}
Switzerland (IFPI Switzerland)	Platinum	30,000^{‡}
United Kingdom (BPI)	Platinum	600,000^{‡}
United States (RIAA)	4× Platinum	4,000,000^{‡}
Streaming
Greece (IFPI Greece)	2× Platinum	4,000,000^{†}
Sweden (GLF)	Gold	6,000,000^{†}
^{‡} Sales+streaming figures based on certification alone.^{†} Streaming-only figures based on certification alone.
