= Circus Maximus (film) =

2023 American musical film and visual album by Travis Scott

- Theatrical release poster
- Directed by: Travis Scott; Harmony Korine; Gaspar Noé; Nicolas Winding Refn; Valdimar Jóhannsson; CANADA; Andrew Dosunmu; Kahlil Joseph
- Written by: Travis Scott
- Produced by: Kathleen Heffernan; Kweku Mandela; Imran Siddiq; Oscar Tiné
- Starring: Travis Scott; Rick Rubin; James Blake; Sheck Wes; Yung Lean; Teezo Touchdown
- Cinematography: Travis Scott: Magnus Jønck; Arseni Khachaturan; Tim Lorentzén; Lukasz Zal
- Distributed by: AMC Theatres
- Release date: July 27, 2023
- Running time: 75 minutes
- Country: United States
- Language: English

Circus Maximus is a 2023 American musical anthology film co-written and directed by Travis Scott who served as executive producer as well. The film is Scott's directorial debut, with segments by Gaspar Noé, Nicolas Winding Refn, Harmony Korine, Valdimar Jóhannsson, Andrew Dosunmu, CANADA, and Kahlil Joseph.

It is a visual companion to the 2023 album Utopia and contains a number of music videos as well as concert footage of the songs from Utopia performed at the Amphitheatre of Pompeii in Pompeii, Italy, interrupted by segments featuring Rick Rubin.

It was released in select AMC Theatres on July 27, 2023, one day before the release of Utopia. It was released on Apple Music on August 7 and on YouTube on August 15.

== Synopsis ==
In interstitial segments, Travis Scott and Rick Rubin have a conversation about Scott’s current feelings. These segments were directed by Harmony Korine.

=== Til Further Notice ===
This segment is directed by Valdimar Jóhannsson. (Note: Stated in the end credits.) Travis Scott is seen walking around mountains in Iceland, and enters an enormous cave, where he is attacked by a monstrous octopus. After the octopus lets go, he continues to trek the mountains and coastline of Iceland, which seamlessly leads into the first conversation between Rubin and Scott.

=== Hyaena ===
This segment is directed by Andrew Dosunmu, and serves as the music video for "Hyaena". Travis Scott was spotted visiting a village in the Kano State of Nigeria for the video, which consists of documentary footage of Scott and life in the village.

=== Sirens ===
This segment is directed by Travis Scott and the Spanish production company CANADA, and serves as the music video for "Sirens". Parts of the segment were filmed in Tarragona, Spain. In this segment, a crowd of people are running around town into an arena, where it's revealed that they're forming a castell together with Scott to help a child reach a hole in the ceiling.

=== Delresto ===
This segment is directed by Nicolas Winding Refn, and serves as the music video for "Delresto (Echoes)". In this segment, Scott is in a blue taxi where his eerily masked driver recklessly careens around in Copenhagen, Denmark.

=== Modern Jam ===
Filmed in Paris, this segment is directed by Gaspar Noé, and serves as the music video for "Modern Jam". In this segment, Scott is DJing at a club. The video has heavy epileptic imagery with 1980s-style transitions throughout the segment.

=== Pompeii ===
This segment is directed by Harmony Korine, and consists of concert footage of Scott performing at the Amphitheatre of Pompeii in Pompeii, Italy.

Song list:

- "Hyaena"
- "Thank God"
- "Modern Jam" (performed alongside Teezo Touchdown)
- "My Eyes"
- "God's Country"
- "Sirens"
- "Fe!n" (performed alongside Sheck Wes) (Note: Sheck Wes raps a new verse not present in the original song.)
- "Circus Maximus"
- "Delresto (Echoes)"
- "Parasail" (performed alongside Yung Lean)
- "Til Further Notice" (performed alongside James Blake)
- "Telekinesis"

== Cast ==
- Travis Scott
- Rick Rubin
- James Blake
- Sheck Wes
- Yung Lean
- Teezo Touchdown
- Jazzelle
- RaysCorruptedMind

== Release and promotion ==
On July 23, 2023, Scott announced the title of the film at the end of his performance at Rolling Loud Miami 2023. On July 25, 2023, Scott announced the film on his social media and released a trailer and poster of the movie. Although the official poster states that it was produced by A24, the company has denied any involvement with the film.

Circus Maximus was released at select AMC Theatres in the U.S. on July 27, 2023. All attendees were given a free promotional T-shirt. On August 7, 2023, the film was released on Apple Music, hours after Scott performed in Rome. On August 15, 2023, the film was uploaded on YouTube alongside the music videos for "Hyaena", "Sirens", "Modern Jam", and "Delresto (Echoes)", which were included in the film.
