= Telekinesis (song) =

2023 song by Travis Scott featuring SZA and Future

Song by Travis Scott featuring SZA and Future

from the album Utopia
- Released: July 28, 2023
- Recorded: November 4, 2019 – June 2023
- Studio: Mercedes-Benz Stadium (Atlanta); Miraval (Correns)
- Genre: Hip-hop; electronic
- Length: 5:53
- Label: Cactus Jack; Epic
- Songwriters: Jacques Webster; Solána Rowe; Nayvadius Wilburn; Jahmal Gwin; Kanye West; Jahaan Sweet; Nima Jahanbin; Paimon Jahanbin; Edgar Panford; Victory Boyd
- Producers: Travis Scott; BoogzDaBeast; Nabeyin; Wallis Lane; Kanye West (add.); Jahaan Sweet (add.); Hudson Mohawke (add.)

"Telekinesis" (stylized in all caps) is a song by American rapper and singer Travis Scott featuring fellow American singer SZA and fellow American rapper Future from the former's fourth studio album, Utopia (2023). It was released on July 28, 2023, as the album's penultimate track. The song was written by the artists, BoogzDaBeast, Kanye West, Jahaan Sweet, Nabeyin, Wallis Lane, Edgar Panford, and Victory Boyd. It was produced by Scott, BoogzDaBeast, Nabeyin, and Wallis Lane, with additional production from West, Sweet, and Hudson Mohawke. Originally recorded for West's albums Jesus Is King (2019) and Donda (2021), he later gave the song to Scott, who was a featured artist on his version, and reused its chord progression for "Heaven and Hell".

A hip-hop and electronic song, "Telekinesis" features synthesizers and string arrangements, which rise throughout. Scott sings its refrain, with Future's lyrics concerning isolation and drug addiction while SZA laments a past lover. It received positive reviews from music critics, who often praised Future and SZA's guest appearances, as well as the song's arrangement. It went on to enter the Billboard Hot 100 at number 26 and the Hot R&B/Hip-Hop Songs chart at number 9. The song also attained top-50 positions in Australia, Canada, New Zealand, and the United Kingdom. It received platinum and double platinum certifications in the US and Canada by the Recording Industry Association of America and Music Canada, respectively.

In January 2025, Boyd filed a legal complaint against Scott, SZA, and Future, alleging that they had used elements of her song "Like the Way it Sounds", the demo that became West's version of "Telekinesis", without her knowledge or permission. Scott's lawyers argued that Boyd wasn't the song's sole author, as she created it with West.

== Background ==
"Telekinesis" was originally a gospel song recorded for Kanye West's albums Jesus Is King (2019), and Donda (2021). It went by multiple different names during production, including "Future Bounce", "Future Sounds", and "Ultrasounds". The song had previously leaked online, with Travis Scott as a featured artist, and was used in promotional material by West. After scrapping it, West repurposed the chord progression for the Donda track "Heaven and Hell", and later gave it to Scott. Like with other songs that were originally West's, such as "God's Country" and "Thank God", his vocals were removed from the final version.

== Composition ==
Through most of the song, soft, wavy synthesizers are played in the production. During Travis Scott's chorus refrain, the instrumental uses "quick snare hits, deep bass, trill hi-hats, and industrial tones", coming in when he proclaims "the future of the bounce". Future's lyrics revolve around isolation increasing his drug addiction, while SZA laments losing a past lover, referencing the song "Marvins Room" by Drake. The track samples "Arena — 83 bpm" by Wallis Lane.

== Critical reception ==
The song received generally positive reviews from music critics, with particular acclaim towards SZA's guest appearance. Complex's Stefan Breskin considered it the best song from Utopia, while Eric Skelton commented that the song "jumped out on first listen" and Mike Destefano called it a "close second" for him. Jessica McKinney and Destefano also regarded the song as having among the album's best features. Gabriel Bras Nevares of HotNewHipHop said, "Out of all the gorgeous moments on this new LP, 'Telekinesis' with Future and SZA is one of the most ascendant." He further stated "SZA's beautiful vocal performance and rapping paired perfectly with rising synths and string arrangements" and compared the song to Travis Scott and Beyoncé's "Delresto (Echoes)" in that "'Telekinesis' opts for consistent and elevatory progressions rather than a big payoff. As a result, it might not gratify you on impact, but every melody and second of its journey will work its way into you."

Vivian Medithi of HipHopDX commented "Unlike the rest of Scott's [Donda] leftovers, Utopia breathes new life into the track, if only by passing the baton to Future and SZA", before calling the song a "great example of why people bother with these records in the first place." Pitchfork's Alphonse Pierre wrote that "Future is strong over the orchestral beat of 'Telekinesis,' and I like when he raps, 'Countin' so much money till my skin peel.' SZA is here, too, sounding good and sounding like she's collecting a check." Andre Gee of Rolling Stone commented that Scott had a "solid verse" on the song, also praising Future's verses, adding that, "When Future laments on 'Telekinesis' that he's 'takin' more drugs all alone in a mansion/Walkin' around tweakin' with the yop in my hands,' you feel like someone's finally depicting what rich-nigga nihilism is supposed to sound like." Ben Devlin of MusicOMH wrote that "Scott's match-making reaches its apex" in the song. Mackenzie Cummings-Grady of Billboard ranked it as the best song from Utopia.

== Lawsuit ==
On January 8, 2025, songwriter Victory Boyd filed a copyright infringement legal complaint against Scott, SZA, and Future, alleging that "Telekinesis" utilized elements of her 2019 song "Like the Way It Sounds" – reportedly written during the studio sessions for West's album Jesus Is King – without her permission. The suit alleged that Boyd, who is credited as a co-writer on "Telekinesis", shared her original song with West, who then recorded a version titled "Ultrasounds"; West then shared the track with Scott without Boyd's "authorization, knowledge or consent". She requested that all the defendants "recall and destroy" any work containing "Telekinesis". Boyd also sued watchmaker Audemars Piguet for using "Telekinesis" in a collaborative advertising campaign with Scott's Cactus Jack brand, despite her refusal to grant them a license.

In response, Scott's lawyers stated in a July 14 motion that Boyd's lawsuit should be dismissed, as she failed to mention that West had contributed to the composition of "Like the Way It Sounds". In her original filing for the complaint, Boyd acknowledged that West had provided her with the "chords and beats" for the song, yet claimed sole authorship. In 2023, she filed a registration with the U.S. Copyright Office, naming herself the sole author of "Like the Way It Sounds", but later filed a second registration for only its lyrics in June 2025. Scott's legal team argued that both filings should be voided, as the first failed to name collaborators while the second was made after the case had begun. In a statement to Billboard, Boyd's attorney Keith Richard said they would "file opposition papers within the next two weeks", expecting Scott's motion "to be summarily denied in short order."

== Charts ==
=== Weekly charts ===
Weekly chart performance for "Telekinesis"
Chart (2023)	Peak position
Australia (ARIA)	19
Australia Hip Hop/R&B (ARIA)	16
Canada Hot 100 (Billboard)	18
Czech Republic Singles Digital (ČNS IFPI)	71
Denmark (Tracklisten)	39
France (SNEP)	64
Global 200 (Billboard)	23
Greece International (IFPI)	19
Iceland (Tónlistinn)	19
Ireland (IRMA)	38
Italy (FIMI)	75
Lithuania (AGATA)	49
Luxembourg (Billboard)	24
New Zealand (Recorded Music NZ)	13
Norway (VG-lista)	27
Portugal (AFP)	36
Sweden (Sverigetopplistan)	74
UK Singles (Official Charts)	31
UK Hip Hop/R&B (Official Charts)	15
US Billboard Hot 100	26
US Hot R&B/Hip-Hop Songs (Billboard)	9

=== Year-end charts ===
Year-end chart performance for "Telekinesis"
Chart (2023)	Position
US Hot R&B/Hip-Hop Songs (Billboard)	57

== Certifications ==
Certifications for "Telekinesis"
Region	Certification	Certified units/sales
Australia (ARIA)	Gold	35,000^{‡}
Brazil (Pro-Música Brasil)	Platinum	40,000^{‡}
Canada (Music Canada)	2× Platinum	160,000^{‡}
Denmark (IFPI Danmark)	Gold	45,000^{‡}
France (SNEP)	Gold	100,000^{‡}
Italy (FIMI)	Gold	50,000^{‡}
New Zealand (RMNZ)	Platinum	30,000^{‡}
Poland (ZPAV)	Gold	25,000^{‡}
United Kingdom (BPI)	Silver	200,000^{‡}
United States (RIAA)	Platinum	1,000,000^{‡}
^{‡} Sales+streaming figures based on certification alone.
