= Sirens (Travis Scott song) =

2023 song by Travis Scott

Song by Travis Scott

from the album Utopia
- Released: July 28, 2023
- Recorded: 2022
- Studio: Miraval (Correns)
- Genre: Progressive hip hop; Alternative hip-hop
- Length: 3:24
- Label: Cactus Jack; Epic
- Songwriters: Jacques Webster; Noah Goldstein; Josiah Sherman; Evan Mast; John Fannon; Keith Kabwe; Isaac Mpofu; Jahaan Sweet
- Producers: Travis Scott; Goldstein (add.); Buddy Ross (add.); E*vax (add.); John Mayer (add.); WondaGurl (add.)

Music video
- "Sirens" on YouTube

"Sirens" is a song by American rapper Travis Scott from his fourth studio album Utopia (2023). The song was produced by Scott, with additional production from Noah Goldstein, Buddy Ross, E*vax, John Mayer and WondaGurl. The song ends with vocals from Canadian rapper Drake, leading into the next song on the album in which he is officially featured on, "Meltdown".

== Composition ==
The song contains samples of "Explorer Suite" by New England and "Nsunka Lwendo" by Amanaz. It uses a distorted beat, which has been noted as influenced by Kanye West, as well as drums that "seemingly take inspiration from" dappankuthu music and "muddled" strings.

== Critical reception ==
The song received generally mixed reviews. Robin Murray of Clash wrote, 'SIRENS' is incredible, a true anthem whose rapid flow shows Travis at his most technically gifted. Intense and unrelenting, it feels built for wide open spaces". In an album review, Thomas Galindo of American Songwriter stated "And, while Scott's raps have never been the most substantive or introspective, the chemistry he finds with the immensely impressive production allows him to fit his voice perfectly into the pockets of his beats," citing "Sirens" as one of the songs that best display this quality. Aron A. of HotNewHipHop commented the song "feels like a psychedelic and exhilarating ride through the interstate at 100 MPH."

Nathan Evans of NME stated that Utopia "rivals OutKast's Stankonia for how it devours genres and settings into his world", before writing "But Scott sounds maddened by the pursuit of finding that vague world" and that it is reflected in how "he puts himself in the throes of" the "cacophonous Zamrock of 'Sirens'". Complex's Ecleen Luzmila Caraballo picked "Sirens" (along with "God's Country") as the "biggest skip" of Utopia, while Mike Destefano described it to be "a bit jarring at full volume, which is certainly intentional, but not the most inviting thing to listen to multiple times over." Vivian Medithi of HipHopDX said the song sounds like a "Huncho Jack, Jack Huncho reject". Andre Gee of Rolling Stone wrote "On 'Sirens,' he rhymes 'detail' with 'de-vail,' 'he-ail, 'pee-pail' and 'festie-vee-ail,' which he follows up with the (more sophisticated?) 'festie-vee-awl.' It might be million-dollar production, but it's not million-dollar rap."

Mackenzie Cummings-Grady of Billboard placed "Sirens" at number 12 in her ranking of the songs from Utopia.

== Music video ==
The music video was released as one of the segments of Travis Scott's film Circus Maximus. Directed by Catalan company Canada, it features Scott participating in building a human tower (or "castell") to escape the underground. The music video was mainly filmed in Tarragona, Spain, as well as in Barcelona, Terrassa, and Montcada i Reixac and features the castells associations Castellers de Vilafranca, Castellers de Mediona, Nois de la Torre, Xiquets de Tarragona and Xiquets del Serrall.

== Charts ==
Chart performance for "Sirens"
Chart (2023)	Peak position
Australia (ARIA)	37
Australia Hip Hop/R&B (ARIA)	19
Canada Hot 100 (Billboard)	24
Czech Republic Singles Digital (ČNS IFPI)	34
France (SNEP)	36
Global 200 (Billboard)	22
Greece International (IFPI)	50
Iceland (Tónlistinn)	18
Italy (FIMI)	54
Latvia (LAIPA)	20
Lithuania (AGATA)	45
New Zealand (Recorded Music NZ)	34
Portugal (AFP)	38
South Africa (Billboard)	17
Sweden Heatseeker (Sverigetopplistan)	4
UK Audio Streaming (OCC)	51
US Billboard Hot 100	27
US Hot R&B/Hip-Hop Songs (Billboard)	16

== Certifications ==
Certifications for "Sirens"
Region	Certification	Certified units/sales
Brazil (Pro-Música Brasil)	Gold	20,000^{‡}
Canada (Music Canada)	Gold	40,000^{‡}
United States (RIAA)	Gold	500,000^{‡}
^{‡} Sales+streaming figures based on certification alone.
