= Aye (Lil Uzi Vert song) =

2023 song by Lil Uzi Vert featuring Travis Scott

Song by Lil Uzi Vert featuring Travis Scott

from the album Pink Tape and Utopia
- Released: June 30, 2023
- Recorded: 2021–2022
- Genre: Rage
- Length: 3:36
- Label: Atlantic; Generation Now
- Songwriters: Symere Woods; Jacques Webster II; Benjamin Saint-Fort; Brandon Veal; Benjamin Thomas
- Producers: Bnyx; Brandon Finessin; Ben Thomas

"Aye" is a song by American rapper Lil Uzi Vert featuring fellow American rapper Travis Scott. It was released on June 30, 2023 as the third track from the former's third studio album Pink Tape, and was later included as the seventh track on the "first edition" of the latter's fourth studio album Utopia with a different mix, before later being replaced with "Meltdown" featuring Drake. The initial pressings of Utopia on vinyl also contained the first edition version of "Aye" rather than "Meltdown", along with a version of "Sirens" without Drake's skit outro, due to a late submission of his verse teased by Mike Dean (presumably to prevent leaks). The song was produced by Bnyx and Brandon Finessin of Working on Dying and Ben Thomas.

== Composition ==
The production of the song begins with strings, which later change pitch, and a slow-tempo trap beat with minimal hit-hats and snares and a booming bass. The rappers perform in a similar vocal and melodic style. Lil Uzi Vert uses an overall rough tone in their performance, consisting of shouts and emphatic lines, while Travis Scott follows Uzi's flow with some switching and more high-pitched vocalizations.

== Reception ==
Gabriel Bras Nevares of HotNewHipHop gave a positive review, writing "They show off plenty of chemistry here, even if Travis Scott has a pretty cringe griddy bar in there that doesn't show him at his best pen game by any means. Even though the Philly MC isn't going full lyrical miracle either, both artists bring an infectious energy to 'Aye' that will have you shouting that repetitive chorus as well." In addition, Nevares described the instrumental as "dramatic, hype-fueling, and addictive" and commented "it's exactly the kind of track to throw elbows out and jump to at a show." Matthew Ritchie of Pitchfork gave a negative review, writing "The pounding BNYX production of 'Aye,' which could soundtrack a supervillain's entrance, feels wasted by two uninspired verses from Uzi and Travis Scott."

== Charts ==
Chart performance for "Aye"
Chart (2023)	Peak position
Canada Hot 100 (Billboard)	44
Global 200 (Billboard)	54
Ireland (IRMA)	68
New Zealand Hot Singles (RMNZ)	4
Poland (Polish Streaming Top 100)	97
UK Singles (OCC)	94
US Billboard Hot 100	31
US Hot R&B/Hip-Hop Songs (Billboard)	11
