= Amanaz =

Zambian rock band

- Origin: Kitwe, Zambia
- Genres: Zamrock; psychedelic rock
- Years active: 1973–1976
- Labels: Zambia Music Parlour, Now-Again (reissue)
- Past members: Keith Kabwe; Isaac Mpofu; John Kanyepa; Jerry Mausala; Watson Lungu

Amanaz was a Zamrock band founded in 1973 in Kitwe, Zambia. The group released their only album, the acclaimed Africa, in 1975. Amanaz drew influences from American and British rock of the late 1960s–early 1970s, especially the music of Jimi Hendrix, and from traditional Zambian music, identifiable in Watson Lungu's drumming and Keith Kabwe's vocals.

The band's name is the acronym of "Ask Me About Nice Artistes in Zambia". Amanaz's include Keith Kabwe, Isaac Mpofu, John Kanyepa, Jerry Mausala and Watson Lungu.

== History ==
In 1973, the band recorded in the Malachite Film Studios of Chingola their sole album named Africa. It was first released as a LP in 1975, and since then re-issued by the German label Shadocks Music in 2008, and by the American label Now-Again Records in 2015. Of the 12 songs of the album, three are performed in the Bemba language and the rest in English.

Amanaz split up in 1976. The same year Keith Kabwe, the former band leader and main vocalist, created the short-lived band Drive Unit.

By 2014, Keith Kabwe served as a Pentecostal pastor in Mbala and was working on the release of gospel songs.

== Reception and legacy ==
The album continues to be influential as an embodiment of a strain of Zamrock. Pitchfork journalist Nate Patrin described it as "both behind and ahead of its era" and therefore uniquely "out of time". Music critic Mark Deming noted that Amanaz's music was based on "deep, bluesy grooves with a strong psychedelic undercurrent and thick layers of fuzz guitar".

Amanaz's song "Khala My Friend" has been featured in several television shows and films. In 2012, it appeared on the soundtrack of Rick Alverson's The Comedy. In 2016, the song was featured in Season 1, Episode 2 of the TBS show People of Earth, as well as Season 3, Episode 1 of the HBO show High Maintenance. Then again in 2021, in the closing credits of Season 2, Episode 3 ("Do the Right-est Thing") of the Apple TV+ series Ted Lasso.

In 2023, a song from their 1975 album Africa, "Nsunka Lwendo" was sampled on American Rapper Travis Scott's song "Sirens" from his 2023 album Utopia.

== Discography ==
- Africa (1975)
