= Sign Crushes Motorist =

Irish slowcore artist

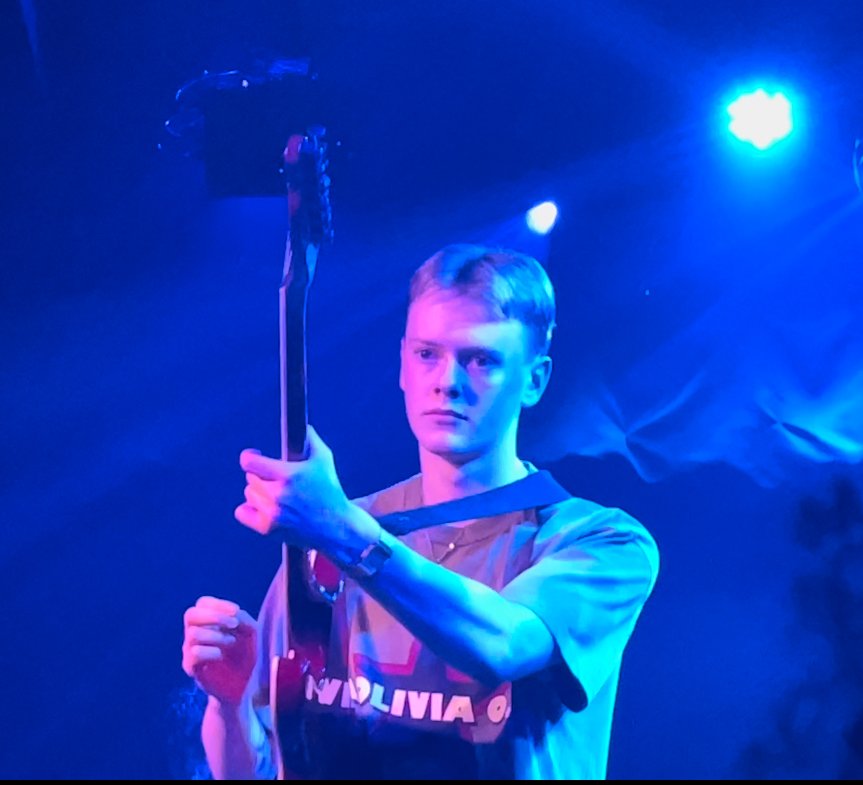
- McCay performing as Sign Crushes Motorist in New York City in 2024

Background information
- Also known as: Birth Day; Burnt Letters; Busty Latinas; Dead Calm; Death Trap; Hold; Make His Ribs Show; Manta; Moon Water; Miserable Teens Club; Roaming; Carson Clay; Scm48; Take Care; Liam Mc Cay
- Born: Liam McCay; 28 February 2005 (age 21); Donegal, Ireland
- Genres: Indie rock; lo-fi; slowcore
- Instrument: Guitar • violin • banjo • keyboards
- Years active: 2022–present
- Website: signcrushesmotorist.bandcamp.com

Sign Crushes Motorist is a musical project by Irish musician Liam McCay (born 28 February 2005). Originally from County Donegal, he is best known for releasing music under this pseudonym, though he has also released music under several others, including Birth Day, Take Care and Dead Calm.

The Sign Crushes Motorist moniker comes from the title of a song by the American band Duster. McCay gained wider recognition in 2023, when several tracks took off online. In December 2023, Eli Enis of Stereogum described the project as “one of the most popular slowcore bands on the internet”.

In October 2025, BBC News reported that McCay had developed more than 14 musical aliases, with Sign Crushes Motorist alone surpassing 2.2 million monthly listeners.

== Early life ==
Liam McCay was born at University Hospital Galway in Galway, Ireland. When he was eight weeks old his family moved to Buncrana, where they have remained since. McCay learned to play the fiddle at age eight and listened to artists such as Simon and Garfunkel and Leonard Cohen growing up.

== Selected discography ==
=== Albums ===
- Roaming (as Roaming) (2022)
- Boyhood (as Birth Day) (2022)
- Televisions (as Death Trap) (2022)
- purgatory (as miserable teens club) (2022)
- i'll be okay (as sign crushes motorist) (2022)
- Basement Tapes (as Make His Ribs Show) (2022)
- Agony (as Take Care) (2022)
- Reject (as Take Care) (2022)
- Alive (as Take Care) (2023)
- Nebula (as Manta) (2023)
- hurting (as sign crushes motorist) (2023)
- Accept (as Dead Calm) (2023)
- 18 (as Carson Clay) (2023)
- Make His Ribs Show (as Make His Ribs Show) (2025)
- 10x (as hold) (2025)
- SADDEST TRUTH (with KayCyy, as sign crushes motorist) (2025)
- Keep Moving (as Dead Calm) (2025)
- FUT Draft (as Carson Clay) (2025)
- Ardaravan Nights (as Liam McCay) (2026)

=== EPs ===
- Moon Water - EP (as Moon Water) (2021)
- it'll pass (as hold) (2021)
- busty latinas (as busty latinas) (2022)
- just give it time (as hold) (2022)
- Split (with Theo Salewicz, It Was Warmer Then, and Make His Ribs Show) (2023)
- up right now (as scm48) (2025)
- Warrior (as Liam McCay) (2026)
