= Meltdown (Travis Scott song) =

2023 single by Travis Scott featuring Drake

Single by Travis Scott featuring Drake

from the album Utopia
- Released: August 15, 2023
- Recorded: 2023
- Studio: Miraval (Correns)
- Genre: Hip hop
- Length: 4:06
- Label: Cactus Jack; Epic
- Songwriters: Jacques Webster II; Aubrey Graham; Matthew Samuels; Anderson Hernandez; Brytavious Chambers; Benjamin Saint-Fort; Scotty Coleman
- Producers: Boi-1da; Vinylz; Tay Keith; Bnyx; Coleman

Travis Scott singles chronology
"Delresto (Echoes)" (2023)	"Meltdown" (2023)	"I Know ?" (2023)

Drake singles chronology
"On the Radar Freestyle" (2023)	"Meltdown" (2023)	"Slime You Out" (2023)

"Meltdown" is a song by American rapper Travis Scott featuring Canadian rapper Drake. It was released on August 15, 2023, as the seventh track and third single from the former's fourth studio album Utopia. The artists wrote the song with producers Coleman, Boi-1da, Vinylz, Tay Keith, and Bnyx.

== Composition and lyrics ==
The song starts out with Drake whispering over a "build-up of a squally string sample" and transitions into an "airy and raspy flow" with several disses against producer Pharrell Williams and rapper Pusha T. Williams was targeted due to his newly assumed position as creative director for Louis Vuitton, previously held by the late Virgil Abloh, a friend of Drake. He also addressed Pusha T's close connection to Williams. The latter had previously been mocked by Drake in the video for "Jumbotron Shit Poppin" (2022). Another slight sees Drake calling out Pusha T for performing a diss track against Jim Jones, a close Drake supporter, at a fashion show held by Williams in June 2023. The diss was also noted for appearing on the same album where Williams contains a production credit ("Looove"). Another reference includes a lawsuit initiated by Vogue after Drake and 21 Savage released a fake Vogue cover to promote their 2022 album Her Loss. Scott "finds himself similarly getting petty and flamboyant across his verses" and references fictional character Willy Wonka during one of his verses. The lyrics are assumed to be aimed at actor Timothée Chalamet, who portrayed Wonka in Wonka (2023); the film was later released on December 15. Chalamet was reportedly dating Scott's ex-girlfriend, American model and media personality Kylie Jenner, at the time of the release. Similar to one of their earlier collaborations, Scott's single, "Sicko Mode", from his third studio album, Astroworld, the track makes use of three beat switches in the song.

== Critical reception ==
Aron A. of HotNewHipHop praised the artists for their "exceptional performance", describing their verses as an "impressive lyrical putting" with "plenty of quotable bars". Another offering within their "incredible track record", A. opines that their collaborations work best when "unexpected". In a negative review, Mackenzie Cummings-Grady of Billboard placed "Meltdown" among the worst three tracks of the album, calling it "disappointingly one-dimensional" and particularly criticized Drake's verses for containing "hollow flexes" and "cheap digs".

== Commercial performance ==
In the United States "Meltdown" debuted at number three on the Billboard Hot 100, becoming Scott's 13th top-ten single, simultaneously with Utopia's track "Fe!n". The song also debuted at number one on the Hot R&B/Hip-Hop Songs, becoming Scott's 6th number one and Drake's 28th. In Canada the song debuted at number one of the Canadian Hot 100, becoming Scott's fourth song to debut directly at no. 1 on the chart and Drake's 12th in his career.

In the United Kingdom "Meltdown" debuted at number ten on the Official Singles Chart, becoming highest new entry of the week and Scott's fifth top-ten song in the country.

== Charts ==
=== Weekly charts ===
Weekly chart performance for "Meltdown"
Chart (2023)	Peak position
Australia (ARIA)	8
Australia Hip Hop/R&B (ARIA)	3
Austria (Ö3 Austria Top 40)	8
Canada Hot 100 (Billboard)	1
Croatia (Billboard)	24
Czech Republic Singles Digital (ČNS IFPI)	17
Denmark (Tracklisten)	17
Finland (Suomen virallinen lista)	37
France (SNEP)	21
Germany (GfK)	61
Global 200 (Billboard)	2
Greece International (IFPI)	6
Hungary (Single Top 40)	17
Iceland (Tónlistinn)	4
Ireland (IRMA)	10
Italy (FIMI)	30
Latvia (LaIPA)	2
Lithuania (AGATA)	13
Luxembourg (Billboard)	4
MENA (IFPI)	5
Netherlands (Single Top 100)	30
New Zealand (Recorded Music NZ)	4
Nigeria (TurnTable Top 100)	63
New Zealand (Recorded Music NZ)	13
Poland (Polish Streaming Top 100)	13
Portugal (AFP)	12
Romania (Billboard)	12
Slovakia Singles Digital (ČNS IFPI)	4
South Africa Streaming (TOSAC)	2
Sweden (Sverigetopplistan)	45
Switzerland (Schweizer Hitparade)	2
UK Singles (Official Charts)	10
UK Hip Hop/R&B (Official Charts)	4
US Billboard Hot 100	3
US Hot R&B/Hip-Hop Songs (Billboard)	1
US Rhythmic Airplay (Billboard)	2

=== Year-end charts ===
2023 year-end chart performance for "Meltdown"
Chart (2023)	Position
Canada (Canadian Hot 100)	69
US Billboard Hot 100	97
US Hot R&B/Hip-Hop Songs (Billboard)	32

2024 year-end chart performance for "Meltdown"
Chart (2024)	Position
US Hot R&B/Hip-Hop Songs (Billboard)	85

== Certifications ==
Certifications for "Meltdown"
Region	Certification	Certified units/sales
Brazil (Pro-Música Brasil)	Platinum	40,000^{‡}
Canada (Music Canada)	2× Platinum	160,000^{‡}
Italy (FIMI)	Gold	50,000^{‡}
New Zealand (RMNZ)	Gold	15,000^{‡}
Poland (ZPAV)	Gold	25,000^{‡}
Switzerland (IFPI Switzerland)	Gold	15,000^{‡}
United Kingdom (BPI)	Silver	200,000^{‡}
United States (RIAA)	Platinum	1,000,000^{‡}
^{‡} Sales+streaming figures based on certification alone.
