= Thank God (Travis Scott song) =

2023 song by Travis Scott

Song by Travis Scott

from the album Utopia
- Released: July 28, 2023
- Recorded: 2020–2023
- Studio: Island Sound (Honolulu); Mercedes-Benz Stadium (Atlanta); Miraval (Correns); Abbey Road (London)
- Genre: Christian hip-hop; trap
- Length: 3:04
- Label: Cactus Jack; Epic
- Songwriters: Jacques Webster II; Mark Mbogo; Stormi Webster; Kanye West; Allen Ritter; Michael Mulé; Isaac de Boni; Ebony Oshunrinde; Jahmal Gwin
- Producers: Scott; West; Ritter; FnZ; WondaGurl; BoogzDaBeast

"Thank God" is a song by American rapper Travis Scott from his fourth studio album Utopia (2023). It features uncredited additional vocals from Kenyan-American rapper KayCyy and Travis Scott's daughter, Stormi Webster, as well as adlibs from American rapper Teezo Touchdown. It was produced by Scott, Kanye West, Allen Ritter, FnZ, WondaGurl and BoogzDaBeast.

== Background ==
"Thank God" is the second track on Travis Scott's fourth studio album, Utopia, released on July 28, 2023. The song's origins trace back to 2020; it was originally intended for Kanye West's album Donda (2021) under the working title "Thank God I Breathe." The track features uncredited vocals from Kenyan-American artist KayCyy (who also co-wrote the hook), Teezo Touchdown, and a brief cameo from Scott’s daughter, Stormi Webster.

"Thank God" is one of the tracks from Utopia that were originally recorded for Kanye West's album Donda (2021).

== Composition ==
The song uses an electric beat, which also changes.

The song is categorized as Christian hip-hop and trap. It is notable for its atmospheric production and a significant beat switch mid-track—a signature element of Scott’s musical style. The production team was a high-profile collaboration involving:

- Travis Scott
- Kanye West
- WondaGurl
- Allen Ritter
- FnZ
- BoogzDaBeast

== Critical reception ==
"Thank God" received generally positive reviews from music critics. Mike Destefano of Complex deemed "Thank God" the third best song from Utopia and said its beat switch was among his favorite instrumental pieces on the record. In addition, he commented in regard to the album that "it feels like he's doing some of the best rapping of his career here" and tracks like "Thank God" display this best. Robin Murray of Clash called the song a "bravura performance, ominous yet also subtle". Aron A. of HotNewHipHop had a less favorable reaction, writing that the line "Shit I speak is what they need" is a "statement that feels out of touch with reality, considering that he doesn't really say anything profound."

Mackenzie Cummings-Grady of Billboard placed the song at number 14 in her ranking of the songs from Utopia.

== Charts ==
Chart performance for "Thank God"
Chart (2023)	Peak position
Australia (ARIA)	18
Australia Hip Hop/R&B (ARIA)	8
Austria (Ö3 Austria Top 40)	13
Belgium (Ultratop 50 Wallonia)	50
Canada Hot 100 (Billboard)	16
Czech Republic Singles Digital (ČNS IFPI)	14
Denmark (Tracklisten)	29
France (SNEP)	14
Global 200 (Billboard)	15
Greece International (IFPI)	21
Hungary (Single Top 40)	20
Iceland (Tónlistinn)	9
Italy (FIMI)	33
Latvia (LaIPA)	7
Lithuania (AGATA)	24
Luxembourg (Billboard)	7
MENA (IFPI)	17
New Zealand (Recorded Music NZ)	20
Norway (VG-lista)	24
Poland (Polish Streaming Top 100)	12
Portugal (AFP)	21
South Africa Streaming (TOSAC)	6
Sweden (Sverigetopplistan)	74
Switzerland (Schweizer Hitparade)	4
UK Audio Streaming (OCC)	31
US Billboard Hot 100	16
US Hot R&B/Hip-Hop Songs (Billboard)	9

== Certifications ==
Certifications for "Thank God"
Region	Certification	Certified units/sales
Brazil (Pro-Música Brasil)	Platinum	40,000^{‡}
Canada (Music Canada)	Platinum	80,000^{‡}
Poland (ZPAV)	Gold	25,000^{‡}
United States (RIAA)	Gold	500,000^{‡}
^{‡} Sales+streaming figures based on certification alone.
