= KayCyy =

Kenyan-American rapper (born 1997)

- Also known as: KayCyy Pluto; King Confidence; Pluman; The Glue
- Born: Mark Makora Mbogo; September 23, 1997 (age 28); Keroka, Kenya
- Origin: Saint Paul, Minnesota, U.S.
- Genres: Twin Cities hip-hop; trap; R&B
- Occupations: Rapper; singer; songwriter
- Years active: 2016–present
- Labels: BuVision; Columbia; Alive; AWGE; YZY SND
- Member of: Hiibryd
- Website: whoiskaycyy.com

Mark Makora Mbogo (born September 23, 1997), known professionally as KayCyy or KayCyy Pluto, is a Kenyan-American rapper, singer and songwriter.

Born in Keroka, Kenya, to Kisii parents, Mbogo moved with his family to the United States at an early age. Throughout his career, he has released five mixtapes, and several singles with his debut studio album Who Is KayCyy? set to release in the near future. KayCyy has worked as a songwriter and credited vocalist alongside several major artists, including Kanye West, Lil Baby, Lil Wayne, and Travis Scott amongst others. Most notably, KayCyy had a large contribution towards the production of West's tenth studio album Donda, writing and recording references for a multitude of tracks.

== Early life ==
Mark Makora Mbogo was born in Keroka, Kenya on September 23, 1997. At the age of nine, he and his family moved to the United States and resided in Saint Paul, Minnesota. He attended Tartan Senior High School in the nearby suburb of Oakdale. During school breaks, he spent time in New York City collaborating with other musical artists. After he graduated from high school, Mbogo moved to New York City and later Los Angeles in pursuit of his music career.

== Career ==
In 2016, while still in high school, he signed to Alive Productions, a record label founded by music producer Reefa, with him later leaving in 2021. He released two mixtapes, Patient Enough and Ups & Downs, in 2020 and 2021 respectively.

Mbogo has worked with multiple other artists, having writing credits on Lil Wayne's album Funeral and Kanye West's single "Wash Us in the Blood".

Mbogo has worked closely with West since 2019. The rappers met through record executive Abou "Bu" Thiam, who later became West's manager, as well as KayCyy's. KayCyy is currently signed to Bu's record label BuVision and Columbia Records and is credited as a performer and writer on West's tenth studio album Donda, including on the single "Hurricane", which topped multiple international song charts.

Mbogo was nominated for a Grammy Award for Album of the Year for his work on Kanye's studio album Donda, and won a Grammy Award for contributing background vocals to the single, "Hurricane" by Kanye West which won Grammy Award for Best Melodic Rap Performance. Mbogo released a collaborative EP with Gesaffelstein titled TW20 50 on March 11, 2022, and he released the mixtape, Get Used To It on June 2, 2022. On May 26, 2023, he released his second collaborative EP with Gesaffelstein, TW2052. Mbogo was featured and involved with the songwriting on the song, "Thank God" on Travis Scott’s album Utopia.

== Discography ==
=== Studio albums ===
List of studio albums, with selected details
Title	Album details
My Uncle's Radio	Expected Release: 2026; Expected Label: AWGE; Formats: Digital download, streaming
Never Been So Sure	Expected Release: 2026; Expected Label: AWGE; Formats: Digital download, streaming
Who Is KayCyy?	Expected Release: 2026; Expected Label: AWGE; Formats: Digital download, streaming

=== Collaborative albums ===
List of collaborative albums, with selected details
Title	Album details
Saddest Truth (with Sign Crushes Motorist, as Hiibryd)	Released: April 11, 2025; Label: BuVision, Columbia; Formats: Digital download, streaming

=== Extended plays ===
List of extended plays, with selected details
Title	Extended plays details
Pluman 2	Released: January 4, 2017; Label: Alive; Formats: Digital download, streaming
Plumixes	Released: June 22, 2017; Label: Alive; Formats: Digital download, streaming
Having My Way	Released: September 24, 2020; Label: Alive; Formats: Digital download, streaming
TW20 50 (with Gesaffelstein)	Released: March 11, 2022; Label: BuVision, Columbia; Formats: Digital download, streaming
Who Else Would It Be	Released: November 11, 2022; Label: BuVision, Columbia; Formats: Digital download, streaming
#NewMusicMondays	Released: December 7, 2022; Label: BuVision, Columbia; Formats: Digital download, streaming
TW2052 (with Gesaffelstein)	Released: May 26, 2023; Label: BuVision, Columbia; Formats: Digital download, streaming

=== Mixtapes ===
List of mixtapes, with selected details
Title	Mixtape details
Pluman (as KayCyy Pluto)	Released: February 13, 2016; Label: Alive; Formats: Digital download, streaming
Vacation	Released: August 29, 2016; Label: Alive; Formats: Digital download, streaming
Pluman 3	Released: February 23, 2018; Label: Alive; Formats: Digital download, streaming
Patient Enough	Released: March 27, 2020; Label: Alive; Formats: Digital download, streaming
Ups & Downs	Released: February 14, 2021; Label: Alive; Formats: Digital download, streaming
Get Used To It	Released: March 26, 2022; Label: BuVision, Columbia; Formats: Digital download, streaming
PLUM4N	Released: December 24, 2024; Label: Self-Released; Formats: Digital download, streaming (Exclusively on SoundCloud)
BEFORE I WAS BORN	Released: June 13, 2025; Label: Self-Released; Formats: Digital download, streaming
MIXTAPE V1	Released: October 31, 2025; Label: Self-Released; Formats: Digital download, streaming

=== Other charted songs ===
List of songs, with selected chart positions, showing year released and album name
Title	Year	Peak chart positions						Album
Title	Year	US	US R&B	US Rap	AUS	CAN	UK R&B	Album
"Keep My Spirit Alive" (Kanye West featuring KayCyy, Westside Gunn, and Conway the Machine)	2021	59	28	23	41	51	17	Donda
"—" denotes a recording that did not chart or was not released in that territory.
