= Valdimar Jóhannsson =

Icelandic filmmaker (born 1978)

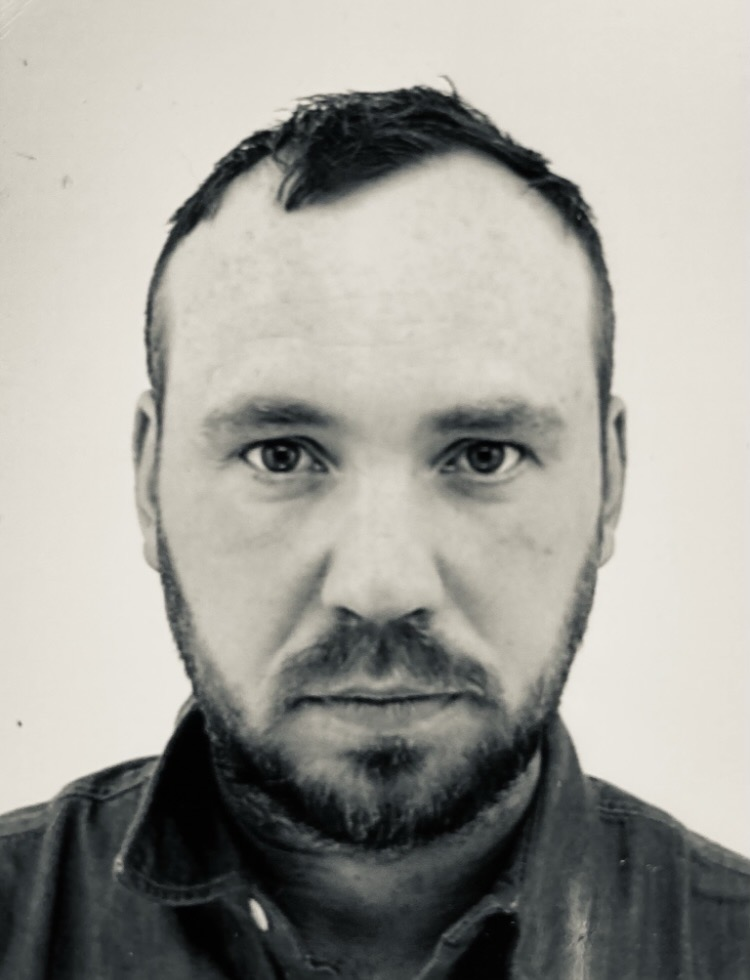
- Valdimar in 2021
- Born: 28 April 1978 (age 47)
- Occupations: film director; screenwriter
- Awards: Edda Award for Best Director

Valdimar Jóhannsson (born 28 April 1978) is an Icelandic film director and screenwriter.

Valdimar was born in northern Iceland in 1978. He has worked in various filmmaking jobs, including grip, lighting, cinematographer and effects technician on projects including Rogue One, The Secret Life of Walter Mitty, LazyTown, Amundsen, Game of Thrones, and Prometheus. In 2003 he made his first short film entitled Pjakkur. He presented his short film Dolor in 2008 at the Reykjavík International Film Festival. From 2013 to 2015 he participated in the PhD program at Béla Tarr's Film Factory in Sarajevo.

Valdimar's first feature film was Lamb (2021), which he both directed and wrote. Lamb swept the board at the 2022 Edda Awards, winning 12 titles, including Best Film and Best Screenplay for Valdimar. Lamb also won Un Certain Regard Prize for Originality in Cannes, the Nordic Council Film Prize, and was shortlisted for the Academy Award for Best International Feature Film.

Valdimar lives in Reykjavík with his wife and daughters.

== Filmography ==
As director:

- Pjakkur (2003 short)
- Dolor (Harmsaga) (2008 short)
- Dawn (Dögun) (2012 short)
- Lamb (Dýrið) (2021)
- Circus Maximus (2023) (segments)
