= God's Country (Travis Scott song) =

2023 song by Travis Scott

Song by Travis Scott

from the album Utopia
- Released: July 28, 2023
- Recorded: 2020–2022
- Studio: Island Sound (Honolulu); Abbey Road (London); Shangri-La (California)
- Genre: Christian hip-hop
- Length: 2:07
- Label: Cactus Jack; Epic
- Songwriters: Jacques Webster; Kanye West; Samuel Gloade; Dylan Cleary-Krell
- Producers: Travis Scott; 30 Roc; Dez Wright

Music video
- "God's Country" on YouTube

"God's Country" (often stylized in all caps) is a song by American rapper Travis Scott from his fourth studio album, Utopia (2023). It was written by Scott, 30 Roc, Dez Wright, and Kanye West, being produced by the former three. The song is one of several tracks that originated from sessions for West's 2021 album Donda, with Scott originally being a guest artist.

== Background ==
Along with several other tracks from Utopia, "God's Country" originated as a song by American rapper Kanye West, created during the sessions for his tenth studio album, Donda, then titled God's Country. Like "Telekinesis", which started out as West's "Future Sounds", Travis Scott was the track's featured artist. West would post a tracklist for Donda in July 2020 that featured "God's Country" as its tenth track, and the song was previewed in a leaked documentary about the album, directed by Dame Dash. A version with both rappers was also included on West's scrapped Donda: With Child visual album, directed by Vanessa Beecroft and leaked in September 2023.

In August 2022, Scott performed "God's Country" during his show at the O2 Arena in London. Two months later, a version with a verse from West leaked online. According to No Bells' Zazie Bae, who talked with members of music leaking communities to find out which Utopia tracks were reworks of older songs, West's verse was cut due to it remaining unfinished, with Scott partially recording over his lines for the finished version of the song.

== Composition ==
The song includes a looped vocal passage which is sampled from Polish composer Krzysztof Komeda's "Lullaby, Part 1". In the lyrics, Travis Scott highlights the notion of togetherness, emphasizing his family and moving away from public attention. Stylistically, he uses an "exclamatory" tone similar to that of Kanye West's.

== Critical reception ==
The song received generally positive reviews from critics, particularly for the use of its sample. Variety's Yousef Srour and Jem Aswad commented, "The biting screams on 'God's Country' call to mind Ye's shrieks on 'I Am a God'". Paul Attard of Slant Magazine described the song as a "psychedelic trip that's made even more surreal" by the sample. Andre Gee of Rolling Stone said the song's vocal sample "evokes a horror movie about possessed children who lurk on the outskirts of sundown towns" and that Scott has a "solid" verse. Aron A. of HotNewHipHop wrote the song "brings slinky child-like vocal samples through knocking bass. It's eerie yet playful and carries across the project." Ben Devlin of MusicOMH wrote it "features a positively haunting vocal sample over which Scott delivers some of his most characterful lyrics".

Complex's Eric Skelton and Ecleen Luzmila Caraballo picked "God's Country" (along with "Sirens") as the "biggest skip" of Utopia. Similarly, Vivian Medithi of HipHopDX commented that the sample "screams immediate skip."

Mackenzie Cummings-Grady of Billboard placed "God's Country" at number 16 in her ranking of the songs from Utopia.

== Music video ==
An official music video premiered alongside the song. At the start, Travis Scott takes a camera from people in a car and apparently uses it to film the daily lives and activities in a neighborhood. The visual features shots of fast bikes, basketball, dancing, and community members (mostly children) singing the song.

== Charts ==
Chart performance for "God's Country"
Chart (2023)	Peak position
Australia (ARIA)	40
Australia Hip Hop/R&B (ARIA)	20
Canada Hot 100 (Billboard)	27
Czech Republic Singles Digital (ČNS IFPI)	37
France (SNEP)	39
Global 200 (Billboard)	25
Greece International (IFPI)	45
Iceland (Tónlistinn)	21
Italy (FIMI)	56
Latvia (LAIPA)	16
Lithuania (AGATA)	41
New Zealand (Recorded Music NZ)	38
Portugal (AFP)	40
South Africa Streaming (TOSAC)	10
Sweden Heatseeker (Sverigetopplistan)	7
UK Audio Streaming (Official Charts)	58
US Billboard Hot 100	28
US Hot R&B/Hip-Hop Songs (Billboard)	17

== Certifications ==
Certifications for "God's Country"
Region	Certification	Certified units/sales
Brazil (Pro-Música Brasil)	Platinum	40,000^{‡}
Canada (Music Canada)	Gold	40,000^{‡}
United States (RIAA)	Gold	500,000^{‡}
^{‡} Sales+streaming figures based on certification alone.
