= Delresto (Echoes) =

2023 single by Beyoncé and Travis Scott

Single by Travis Scott and Beyoncé

from the album Utopia
- Released: July 28, 2023
- Recorded: 2020–2023
- Studio: Shangri-La (California)
- Genre: Hip house
- Length: 4:34
- Label: Parkwood; Cactus Jack; Columbia; Epic
- Songwriters: Beyoncé Knowles-Carter; Jacques Webster II; James Litherland; Terius Nash; Chauncey Hollis Jr.; Michael Dean; Allen Ritter
- Producer: Travis Scott

Travis Scott singles chronology
"K-pop" (2023)	"Delresto (Echoes)" (2023)	"Meltdown" (2023)

Beyoncé singles chronology
"Virgo's Groove" (2023)	"Delresto (Echoes)" (2023)	"My House" (2023)

Audio video
- "Delresto (Echoes)" on YouTube

"Delresto (Echoes)" is a song by the American rapper and singer Travis Scott with the singer Beyoncé. (Note: Beyoncé is credited as a featured artist on the album version of "Delresto (Echoes)".) It was released through Beyoncé's Parkwood Entertainment, Scott's Cactus Jack, Columbia, and Epic Records as the second single from his fourth studio album Utopia, both being released on July 28, 2023. The song was produced by Scott with additional production by Beyoncé, Hit-Boy, Mike Dean, and Allen Ritter; all of whom wrote the song alongside James Blake and The-Dream. The song also features uncredited additional vocals from Justin Vernon of Bon Iver.

"Delresto (Echoes)" received positive reviews from critics, who praised Beyoncé's vocal performance and the song's production. In the United States, "Delresto (Echoes)" debuted at number 25 on the Billboard Hot 100 alongside entering at 14 on the Hot R&B/Hip-Hop Songs chart. The song charted in fourteen other countries, including Canada and the United Kingdom.

== Background ==
In a 2015 Complex interview, Scott stated that he wanted to collaborate with Beyoncé. He said: "You know, I'm from Houston, she's from Houston. I feel like we—we're definitely in due time to do some music." In 2019, it was revealed in a Vibe interview with R&B artist Tone Stith that both Beyoncé and Scott were still looking to collaborate, as Stith's song "Good Company" began as a demo for Beyoncé and Scott before being completed alongside Quavo and Swae Lee. Later, on Beyoncé's 2023 Renaissance World Tour, she performed the song "America Has a Problem". As the song played, images of a newspaper titled "The Echo" were displayed on the concert screens. These images served as a hint towards "Delresto (Echoes)", and were later identified as a major component on the single's cover artwork.

In September 2025, a reference track for "Delresto (Echoes)", recorded by American rapper Kanye West, leaked alongside sixteen others that he recorded for Scott. West's mostly mumbled references, recorded during May 2020, were not incorporated into the final album.

== Composition ==
"Delresto (Echoes)" is a hip house song that has been described as having a "vibrant and progressive instrumental". It draws comparisons to Beyoncé's seventh studio album, Renaissance, due to its similar "house-inspired rhythms and musical aesthetics". In this track, Scott takes a more subdued role, allowing Beyoncé to steer the song and layering in his own "hazy Auto-Tuned speculations as a backdrop". The song samples "Warped Woods", composed by Mattias Hakulinen and Pontus Askbrink, from the soundtrack to the video game Ittle Dew.

== Music video ==
The music video is directed by Nicolas Winding Refn. (Note: Stated in the end credits of Circus Maximus.) The music video is a segment in the film Circus Maximus. The video takes place in the near future when Scott is in a blue taxi where his masked driver drives around in Copenhagen, Denmark. Beyoncé does not appear.

== Critical reception ==
"Delresto (Echoes)" received positive reviews, with critics especially praising Beyoncé's performance. Gabriel Bras Nevares of HotNewHipHop characterized the track as "euphoric" and identified it as a standout from Utopia. He elaborated that "the track feels complete without exaggerating its opulence". Complex considered Beyoncé's feature as the "biggest surprise" of the album, similar to the singer's appearance on Drake's Care Package track "Can I". Recording Academy writer Michael Saponara called the song "one of Utopia's buzziest cameos", praising the production of the song and remarking that "while Beyoncé does much of the heavy lifting on "Delresto (Echoes)" Scott's verse still stands out". Writing for Billboard, Mackenzie Cummings-Grady listed it as the fourth-best song on Utopia. She observed that even though the song seemed stuffed, it was still able to "take flight thanks to Beyoncé’s Renaissance-era groove, which fit in well with Utopia's dystopian vision". Barnaby Lane of Insider highlighted "Beyoncé's angelic tones", which complete "the track's stripped-back sound and Scott's own short verse".

== Charts ==
Chart performance for "Delresto (Echoes)"
Chart (2023)	Peak position
Australia (ARIA)	34
Australia Hip Hop/R&B (ARIA)	18
Canada Hot 100 (Billboard)	26
France (SNEP)	38
Global 200 (Billboard)	19
Greece International (IFPI)	64
Iceland (Tónlistinn)	25
Italy (FIMI)	63
Lithuania (AGATA)	35
Luxembourg (Billboard)	22
New Zealand (Recorded Music NZ)	30
Poland (Polish Streaming Top 100)	38
Portugal (AFP)	37
South Africa (Billboard)	18
Sweden Heatseeker (Sverigetopplistan)	1
UK Streaming (OCC)	45
US Billboard Hot 100	25
US Hot R&B/Hip-Hop Songs (Billboard)	14

== Certifications ==
Certifications for "Delresto (Echoes)"
Region	Certification	Certified units/sales
Brazil (Pro-Música Brasil)	Platinum	40,000^{‡}
Canada (Music Canada)	Gold	40,000^{‡}
^{‡} Sales+streaming figures based on certification alone.
