= My Eyes (Travis Scott song) =

2023 song by Travis Scott

Song by Travis Scott

from the album Utopia
- Released: July 28, 2023
- Recorded: 2022
- Studio: Abbey Road (London)
- Genre: Progressive rap; wave; experimental; psychedelic
- Length: 4:11
- Label: Cactus Jack; Epic
- Songwriters: Jacques Webster; Dua Saleh; Sampha Sisay; Justin Vernon; Wesley Glass; Josiah Sherman; Joseph Thornalley; Ebony Oshunrinde
- Producers: Travis Scott; Vernon; Wheezy; Buddy Ross; Vegyn; WondaGurl

"My Eyes" is a song by American rapper Travis Scott from his fourth studio album Utopia (2023). It features uncredited additional vocals from Sampha and Justin Vernon. The song was written by the vocalists alongside Dua Saleh, Wheezy, Buddy Ross, Vegyn, and WondaGurl, the latter four producing it with Scott and Vernon. The song samples "Over There" by The Japanese House, itself being produced around a loop created by BJ Burton and Vernon.

== Composition ==
In the first part, Scott utilizes tender melodies over the sample and synthesizer production, pitching up his voice in a style that has been compared to Frank Ocean's Blonde and performing in "stuttering flows" similar to that of Ocean's music, while Sampha and Justin Vernon provide vocals as well. The beat switches in the middle of the song, for the rest of which Scott lyrically reflecting on what is at stake for him and the Astroworld Festival crowd crush. Scott also references his ex-girlfriend Kylie Jenner from an interview.

Robin Murray of Clash described the song as having a "sonic soup verging on the ambient on a performance of rare emotion."

== Critical reception ==
The song received critical acclaim, with many calling it one of Scott's best songs. Complex's Eric Skelton commented "Travis is rapping a lot better than we're used to hearing from him", especially on songs like the second half of "My Eyes", while Mike Destefano said the song's beat switch is among his favorite instrumental pieces on Utopia. Thomas Galindo of American Songwriter wrote that Travis Scott's "sparse use of autotune" "helps him deliver more raunchy, raw, fiery verses as he used to a decade ago", citing the second half of "My Eyes" as among the songs in which this quality is most notably displayed. Alphonse Pierre of Pitchfork stated "The digitized lilts over Blonde-inspired fogginess on 'My Eyes' sound nice enough, especially when sprinkled with dreamy riffing from Sampha and Justin Vernon." Paul Attard of Slant Magazine regarded Utopia's sequencing of first six songs, which include "My Eyes", as Scott's "best run of tracks to date." Shaad D'Souza of The Guardian called "The things I created became the most weighted" a sharp line on the song. HotNewHipHop's Aron A. commented that "some moments showcase his tenacity as an MC, like in 'MY EYES.' He beasts through with poetic realizations that actually showcase a glimpse of humanity surrounding the Astroworld Festival tragedy. 'I replay them nights, and right by my side, all I see is a sea of people that ride wit' me,' he raps. 'If they just knew what Scotty would do to jump off the stage and save him a child.' These moments of self-awareness are few and far between. If anything, this bar serves as an acknowledgment of his overtly dedicated fanbase that continues to line up his pockets." Vulture's Craig Jenkins described Sampha and Vernon's vocals as "gorgeous" and Scott's verse in the second part "ferocious".

Jordan Rose of Complex picked the song as the "biggest skip" from Utopia, saying it "feels too slow for this album. I wouldn't skip it because it's bad, but it just feels out of place." Vivian Medithi of HipHopDX criticized the line "If they just knew what Scotty would do to jump off the stage and save him a child", saying it "ruined" the song. NME's Nathan Evans disapproved of the additional vocals, stating the song "makes clunky cameos out of Bon Iver and Sampha, the latter of whom arrives to croon for an almighty three lines."

Mackenzie Cummings-Grady of Billboard placed "My Eyes" at number five in her ranking of the songs from Utopia.

Several critics have mentioned that the song is Scott's most direct artistic acknowledgment of the 2021 Astroworld tragedy. A review from MusicTalkers claims that the songs lyrics include references to Travis's guilt and reflection associated with the event and frames it as one of if not the biggest track on Utopia. Likewise, a Complex feature mentions how the closing part of the song has lyrics that really focuses on the tragedy and expresses Travis's remorse and desire to save the people that died.

== Charts ==
=== Weekly charts ===
Weekly chart performance for "My Eyes"
| Chart (2023–2024) | Peak position |
|---|---|
| Australia (ARIA) | 19 |
| Australia Hip Hop/R&B (ARIA) | 9 |
| Austria (Ö3 Austria Top 40) | 54 |
| Canada Hot 100 (Billboard) | 18 |
| Czech Republic Singles Digital (ČNS IFPI) | 18 |
| Denmark (Tracklisten) | 31 |
| France (SNEP) | 18 |
| Germany (GfK) | 86 |
| Global 200 (Billboard) | 16 |
| Greece International (IFPI) | 24 |
| Hungary (Single Top 40) | 28 |
| Iceland (Tónlistinn) | 6 |
| Italy (FIMI) | 42 |
| Latvia (LaIPA) | 6 |
| Lithuania (AGATA) | 25 |
| Luxembourg (Billboard) | 9 |
| MENA (IFPI) | 19 |
| New Zealand (Recorded Music NZ) | 14 |
| Norway (VG-lista) | 25 |
| Poland (Polish Streaming Top 100) | 20 |
| Portugal (AFP) | 23 |
| South Africa (Billboard) | 13 |
| Sweden (Sverigetopplistan) | 75 |
| Switzerland (Schweizer Hitparade) | 47 |
| UK Singles (Official Charts) | 65 |
| US Billboard Hot 100 | 19 |
| US Hot R&B/Hip-Hop Songs (Billboard) | 12 |

=== Year-end charts ===
2023 year-end chart performance for "My Eyes"
| Chart (2023) | Position |
|---|---|
| US Hot R&B/Hip-Hop Songs (Billboard) | 94 |

2024 year-end chart performance for "My Eyes"
| Chart (2024) | Position |
|---|---|
| Australia Hip Hop/R&B (ARIA) | 49 |
| US Hot R&B/Hip-Hop Songs (Billboard) | 90 |

== Certifications ==
Certifications and sales for "My Eyes"
| Region | Certification | Certified units/sales |
|---|---|---|
| Brazil (Pro-Música Brasil) | 2× Platinum | 80,000^{‡} |
| Canada (Music Canada) | 2× Platinum | 160,000^{‡} |
| Denmark (IFPI Danmark) | Gold | 45,000^{‡} |
| France (SNEP) | Platinum | 200,000^{‡} |
| Germany (BVMI) | Gold | 300,000^{‡} |
| Italy (FIMI) | Gold | 50,000^{‡} |
| Mexico (AMPROFON) | Platinum | 140,000^{‡} |
| New Zealand (RMNZ) | Platinum | 30,000^{‡} |
| Poland (ZPAV) | Platinum | 50,000^{‡} |
| Portugal (AFP) | Platinum | 10,000^{‡} |
| United Kingdom (BPI) | Gold | 400,000^{‡} |
| United States (RIAA) | 2× Platinum | 2,000,000^{‡} |
Streaming
| Greece (IFPI Greece) | Gold | 1,000,000^{†} |
^{‡} Sales+streaming figures based on certification alone.^{†} Streaming-only figures based on certification alone.
