= Miraval Studios =

French recording studio

Coordinates: 43.4737°N 6.0361°E

Miraval Studios is a recording studio in the Château de Miraval, a 900-hectare estate in Correns, in the Var department of Provence (France). Founded in 1977 by French jazz pianist Jacques Loussier and sound engineer Patrice Quef, it was in operation under the name Studio Miraval until 1998, when the château was bought by wine producer Tom Bove. It was sold to the actors Brad Pitt and Angelina Jolie in 2011. Pitt and the French producer Damien Quintard restored and refurbished the studios, and opened them under the name Miraval Studios in October 2022.

== Studio Miraval (1977–2000s) ==
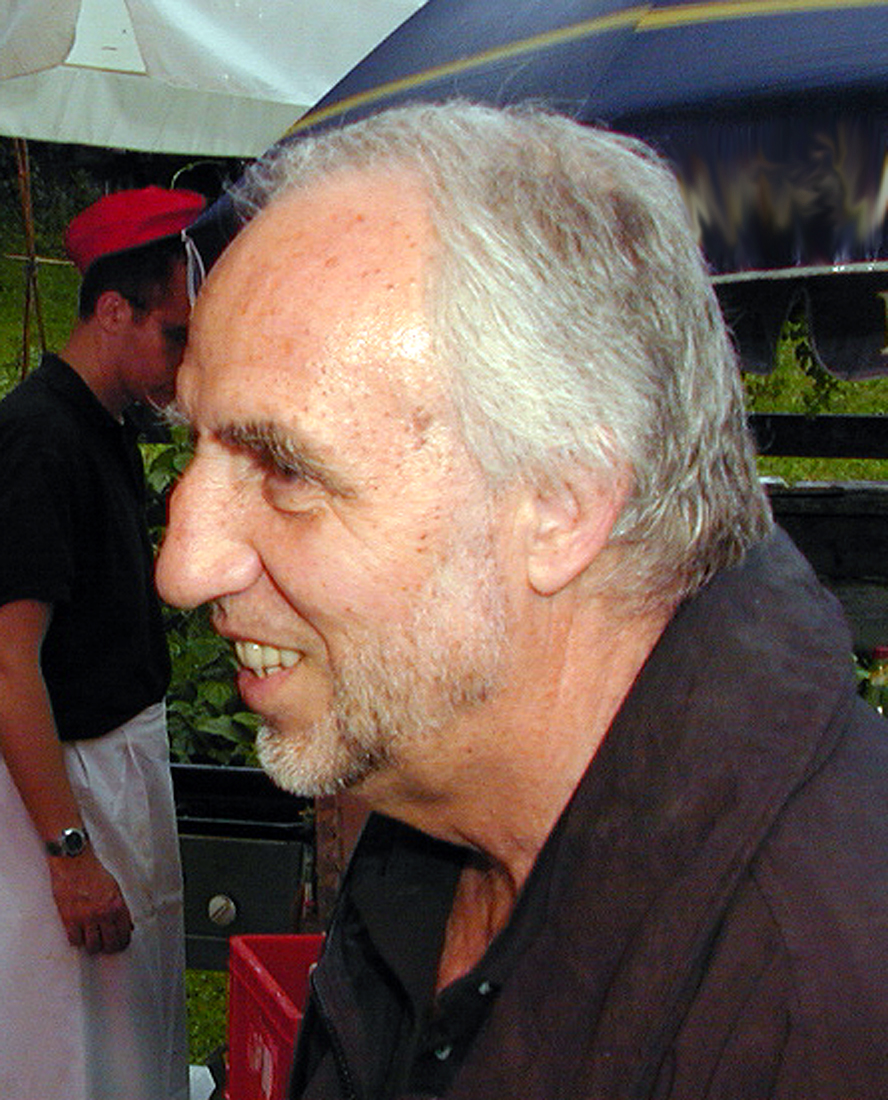
Jacques Loussier, founder of Studio Miraval.

In 1977, French pianist and composer Jacques Loussier, owner of Château de Miraval, and sound engineer Patrice Quef built a state-of-the-art recording studio on the property, which was named Studio Miraval. Loussier began by recording his own work, mainly for films, and then started taking on French artists such as Maxime Le Forestier and Pierre Vassiliu.

Miraval achieved fame thanks to Pink Floyd, who came there in 1979 to record part of their album The Wall. Subsequently, equipped with one of the first SSL mixing consoles in France, Miraval recorded AC/DC, Judas Priest, The Cranberries, The Cure, Muse, Wham!, Level 42, David Sylvian (solo and with Rain Tree Crow), Chris Rea, Sade, the Go-Betweens, Steve Winwood, Yes, UB40, Chris Braide, Shirley Bassey, the Gipsy Kings, Shakatak, Rammstein, Fonky Family, Kelly Family, Blankass, Silmarils, Jimmy Barnes and many others. Later on, in the early and middle 2000s, Rammstein recorded the album Mutter, and Courtney Love also spent a few weeks in the estate. Muse used the studio for their 2006 album Black Holes and Revelations.

In 1998, Loussier sold Miraval to businessman–turned–wine producer Tom Bove who resold it in 2011 to actors Brad Pitt and Angelina Jolie who decided not to operate the studio anymore.

== Miraval Studios (2022–present) ==
On 10 October 2022, Brad Pitt, now separated from Angelina Jolie (who sold her shares in the Miraval estate), and French producer Damien Quintard officially reopened the completely redesigned and refurbished studios under the name Miraval Studios.

One of the studio's first additions is a console with hybrid analog and digital capabilities, a Dolby Atmos system, and all the technology needed to pre-mix for film and television projects. Recording booths and workstations for sound and video editing are also included.

Sade and her eponymous band were the first to record at the studios. Travis Scott used the studio for his 2023 album Utopia. Some of the 2024 Nick Cave and the Bad Seeds album Wild God was recorded at Miraval.
