= Correns =

- Commune
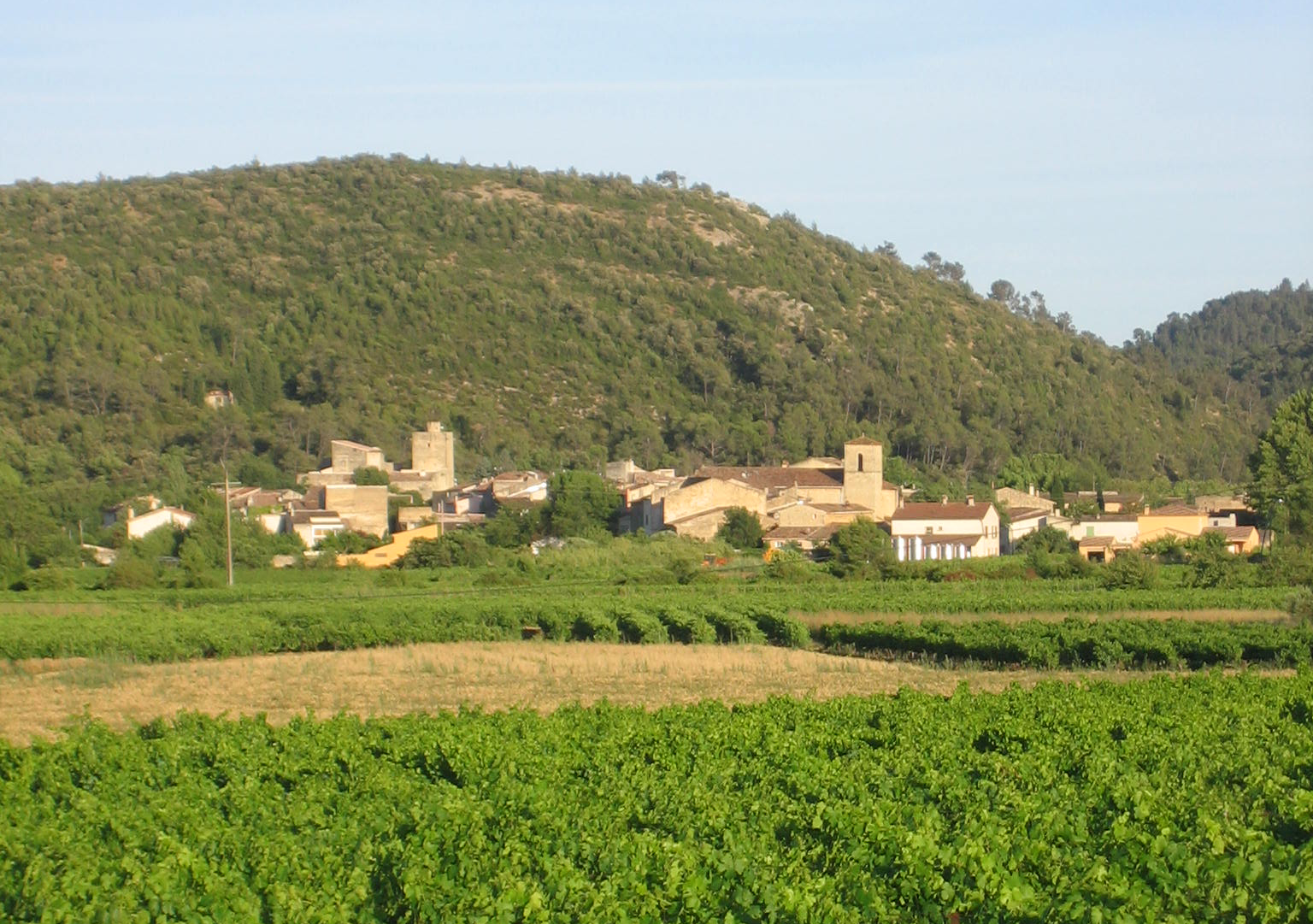
- A general view of the village

- Coat of arms
- Location of Correns
- Location within France Location within Provence-Alpes-Côte d'Azur
- Coordinates: 43°29′18″N 6°04′49″E
- Country: France
- Region: Provence-Alpes-Côte d'Azur
- Department: Var
- Arrondissement: Brignoles
- Canton: Brignoles
- Intercommunality: CA Provence Verte

Government
  - Mayor (2020–2026): Nicole Rullan
- Area^{1}: 37.06 km^{2} (14.31 sq mi)
- Elevation: 152 m (499 ft)
- Highest elevation: 561 m (1,841 ft)
- Lowest elevation: 139 m (456 ft)
- Population (2023): 886
  - Density: 23.9/km^{2} (61.9/sq mi)
- Time zone: UTC+01:00 (CET)
  - Summer (DST): UTC+02:00 (CEST)
- INSEE/Postal code: 83045 /83570
- ^{1} French Land Register data, which excludes lakes, ponds, glaciers > 1 km^{2} (0.386 sq mi or 247 acres) and river estuaries.

Correns (French pronunciation: [kɔʁɑ̃s]; Occitan: Correnç) is a commune in the Var department in the Provence-Alpes-Côte d'Azur region in southeastern France.

Its name in the Provençal language is Courrens. The geographic position of the village is almost in the middle of the linking "autoroute" A8 from Aix-en-Provence to Cannes, only about 10 kilometers in the north.

It is at the entry of two gorges: Vallon Sourn and the Bagarède. The village is on the banks of the Argens River. Correns bills itself as (the) "Premier Village Bio de France". Bio(logique) is the French term for organic, so this means "France's first organic village" where all food and grapes produced are organic. Its main product is wine.

== Popular culture ==
From January to July 1979, English progressive rock group Pink Floyd recorded part of their double studio album The Wall at Studio Miraval located in Correns.

On August 23, 2014, actors Angelina Jolie and Brad Pitt wed in Correns at Château Miraval in a private, nondenominational wedding.

== See also ==
- Communes of the Var department
