= Astroworld – Wish You Were Here Tour =

2018–2019 concert tour by Travis Scott

- Tour by Travis Scott
- Location: North America and Europe
- Associated album: Astroworld
- Start date: November 8, 2018
- End date: July 16, 2019
- Legs: 3
- No. of shows: 57
- Supporting acts: Sheck Wes (first and second legs); Trippie Redd (first leg only before dropping out midway); Gunna (first leg only); Virgil Abloh (first leg only); Octavian (third leg only)

Travis Scott concert chronology
- Birds Eye View Tour (2017); Astroworld – Wish You Were Here Tour (2018–2019); Circus Maximus Tour (2023–2025)

The Astroworld – Wish You Were Here Tour was the third concert tour by American rapper and singer Travis Scott, in support of his third studio album, Astroworld (2018). American rappers Sheck Wes, Trippie Redd, Gunna served as the opening acts in North America for the first leg of the tour, with Sheck Wes solely continuing in North America for the second leg and Octavian being the sole opening act in Europe for the third leg, while Trippie Redd dropped out of the tour less than a month after it started. Don Toliver also came out to perform "Can't Say" with Scott for every show in the first leg and a few shows in the second leg despite not serving as an opening act for the tour. The tour started on November 8, 2018, at the CFG Bank Arena (then known as the Royal Farms Arena) in Baltimore, Maryland, and ended on July 16, 2019, at the O2 Arena in London, England.

== Background ==
The tour was officially announced via Scott's Instagram on August 16, 2018. Scott announced "Ive Been Ready To Get Back On Road For A Long Time!! Astroworld Tour Is Finally Here!!". In August 2018, prior to the start of the tour, Scott announced via Instagram "this is leg one Europe and other cities coming soon". At the start of the tour, Scott announced "more dates TBS". Scott also announced that Virgil Abloh, Sheck Wes, Trippie Redd, and Gunna would perform opening acts. On December 7, 2018, it was announced that Redd would no longer support Scott as an opening act for the duration of the tour due to "production issues" and cut down set times. On June 10, 2019, Scott announced a show at the O2 Arena in London, where he would officially end the tour.

== Setup ==
The initial idea of the Wish You Were Here Tour was to revive the childhood amusement park, Six Flags AstroWorld, where each stage was decorated in a fashion reminiscent of the theme park with features such as a small functioning ferris wheel and roller coaster. Instead of having one stage for the show, Scott opted for two stages, one on each end of the arena.

== Critical reception ==
=== North America ===
The show was reviewed positively by Charles Holmes in Rolling Stone, Julian Kimble in The Washington Post, and by Chris DeVille of Stereogum.

== Set list ==
This set list is representative of the show in Baltimore, Maryland on November 8, 2018. It is not representative of all concerts for the duration of the tour.

1. "Stargazing"
2. "Lose" (instrumental)
3. "Carousel"
4. "Quintana"
5. "Uptown"
6. "Way Back"
7. "Mamacita"
8. "Butterfly Effect"
9. "No Bystanders"
10. "Don't Play"
11. "Dark Knight Dummo" (originally performed by Trippie Redd)
12. "Upper Echelon"
13. "Skyfall"
14. "Through the Late Night"
15. "Drugs You Should Try It"
16. "90210"
17. "Love Galore" (originally performed by SZA)
18. "Skeletons"
19. "Astrothunder"
20. "R.I.P. Screw"
21. "Houstonfornication"
22. "Stop Trying to Be God"
23. "NC-17"
24. "Zeze" (originally performed by Kodak Black)
25. "Beibs in the Trap"
26. "Yosemite" (with Gunna)
27. "Piss on Your Grave" (instrumental)
28. "5% Tint"
29. "Can't Say" (with Don Toliver)
30. "Antidote"
31. "Goosebumps"
32. "Sicko Mode"

== Tour dates ==
List of concerts, showing date, city, country, venue, opening acts, tickets sold, number of available tickets and amount of gross revenue
Date	City	Country	Venue	Opening act	Attendance	Revenue
Leg 1- North America
November 8, 2018	Baltimore	United States	Royal Farms Arena	Trippie Redd; Sheck Wes; Gunna; Virgil Abloh	11,444 / 13,325	$553,291
November 9, 2018	Raleigh	United States	PNC Arena	Trippie Redd; Sheck Wes; Gunna; Virgil Abloh	15,305 / 15,305	$858,876
November 11, 2018	Miami	United States	American Airlines Arena	Trippie Redd; Sheck Wes; Gunna; Virgil Abloh	15,050 / 15,050	$1,042,145
November 12, 2018	Tampa	United States	Amalie Arena	Trippie Redd; Sheck Wes; Gunna; Virgil Abloh	—N/a	—N/a
November 13, 2018	Atlanta	United States	State Farm Arena	Trippie Redd; Sheck Wes; Gunna; Virgil Abloh	12,166 / 12,166	$884,444
November 15, 2018	Dallas	United States	American Airlines Center	Trippie Redd; Sheck Wes; Gunna; Virgil Abloh	14,295 / 15,199	$980,570
November 17, 2018 (Note: Part of Astroworld Festival.)	Houston	United States	NRG Park	Trippie Redd; Sheck Wes; Gunna; Virgil Abloh	—N/a	—N/a
November 19, 2018	Louisville	United States	KFC Yum! Center	Trippie Redd; Sheck Wes; Gunna; Virgil Abloh	15,722 / 16,496	$846,323
November 21, 2018	Toronto	Canada	Scotiabank Arena	Trippie Redd; Sheck Wes; Gunna; Virgil Abloh	17,380 / 17,741	$1,345,444
November 24, 2018	Newark	United States	Prudential Center	Trippie Redd; Sheck Wes; Gunna; Virgil Abloh	15,811 / 15,811	$1,341,089
November 25, 2018	Pittsburgh	United States	PPG Paints Arena	Trippie Redd; Sheck Wes; Gunna; Virgil Abloh	15,288 / 15,288	$800,224
November 27, 2018	New York City	United States	Madison Square Garden	Trippie Redd; Sheck Wes; Gunna; Virgil Abloh	32,602 / 32,602	$2,823,519
November 28, 2018	New York City	United States	Madison Square Garden	Trippie Redd; Sheck Wes; Gunna; Virgil Abloh	32,602 / 32,602	$2,823,519
November 29, 2018	Washington, D.C.	United States	Capital One Arena	Trippie Redd; Sheck Wes; Gunna; Virgil Abloh	16,512 / 16,512	$1,109,471
November 30, 2018	Hartford	United States	XL Center	Trippie Redd; Sheck Wes; Gunna; Virgil Abloh	—N/a	—N/a
December 1, 2018	Philadelphia	United States	Wells Fargo Center	Trippie Redd; Sheck Wes; Gunna; Virgil Abloh	17,003 / 17,057	$1,237,017
December 2, 2018	Boston	United States	TD Garden	Trippie Redd; Sheck Wes; Gunna; Virgil Abloh	16,109 / 16,113	$1,172,754
December 4, 2018	Cleveland	United States	Quicken Loans Arena	Trippie Redd; Sheck Wes; Gunna; Virgil Abloh	—N/a	—N/a
December 5, 2018	Detroit	United States	Little Caesars Arena	Trippie Redd; Sheck Wes; Gunna; Virgil Abloh	16,567 / 16,567	$1,177,594
December 6, 2018	Chicago	United States	United Center	Trippie Redd; Sheck Wes; Gunna; Virgil Abloh	17,513 / 17,513	$1,327,057
December 8, 2018	Minneapolis	United States	Target Center	Trippie Redd; Sheck Wes; Gunna; Virgil Abloh	14,750 / 14,750	$939,481
December 9, 2018	Milwaukee	United States	Fiserv Forum	Trippie Redd; Sheck Wes; Gunna; Virgil Abloh	—N/a	—N/a
December 10, 2018	Omaha	United States	CHI Health Center Omaha	Trippie Redd; Sheck Wes; Gunna; Virgil Abloh	11,549 / 14,738	$683,484
December 12, 2018	Denver	United States	Pepsi Center	Trippie Redd; Sheck Wes; Gunna; Virgil Abloh	13,770 / 14,103	$972,132
December 15, 2018	Sacramento	United States	Golden 1 Center	Trippie Redd; Sheck Wes; Gunna; Virgil Abloh	16,080 / 16,080	$1,118,848
December 16, 2018	Oakland	United States	Oracle Arena	Trippie Redd; Sheck Wes; Gunna; Virgil Abloh	15,617 / 15,617	$1,066,718
December 18, 2018	Phoenix	United States	Talking Stick Resort Arena	Trippie Redd; Sheck Wes; Gunna; Virgil Abloh	15,774 / 15,774	$938,243
December 19, 2018	Inglewood	United States	The Forum	Trippie Redd; Sheck Wes; Gunna; Virgil Abloh	32,486 / 35,010	$2,447,312
December 20, 2018	Inglewood	United States	The Forum	Trippie Redd; Sheck Wes; Gunna; Virgil Abloh	32,486 / 35,010	$2,447,312
December 22, 2018	Portland	United States	Moda Center	Trippie Redd; Sheck Wes; Gunna; Virgil Abloh	15,624 / 15,624	$1,021,593
Leg 2- North America
January 25, 2019	Vancouver	Canada	Rogers Arena	Sheck Wes	16,191 / 16,191	$1,338,325
January 27, 2019	Portland	United States	Moda Center	Sheck Wes	15,969 / 15,969	$690,142
January 29, 2019	Tacoma	United States	Tacoma Dome	Sheck Wes	14,530 / 14,530	$1,032,208
February 4, 2019	San Diego	United States	Pechanga Arena	Sheck Wes	10,562 / 11,939	$899,911
February 6, 2019	Las Vegas	United States	T-Mobile Arena	Sheck Wes	13,243 / 13,243	$969,827
February 8, 2019	Inglewood	United States	The Forum	Sheck Wes	16,305 / 16,305	$1,719,024
February 13, 2019	Houston	United States	Toyota Center	Sheck Wes	14,120 / 14,120	$1,395,539
February 17, 2019	Kansas City	United States	Sprint Center	Sheck Wes	14,039 / 14,089	$1,215,415
February 18, 2019	St. Louis	United States	Enterprise Center	Sheck Wes	13,047 / 15,450	$856,705
February 20, 2019	Indianapolis	United States	Bankers Life Fieldhouse	Sheck Wes	13,727 / 13,727	$973,854
February 21, 2019	Chicago	United States	United Center	Sheck Wes	15,368 / 15,368	$1,360,723
February 22, 2019	Milwaukee	United States	Fiserv Forum	Sheck Wes	12,749 / 12,749	$845,719
February 24, 2019	Columbus	United States	Schottenstein Center	Sheck Wes	14,039 / 14,089	$1,028,887
February 26, 2019	University Park	United States	Bryce Jordan Center	Sheck Wes	12,690 / 12,690	$918,829
March 2, 2019	New York City	United States	Madison Square Garden	Sheck Wes	16,181 / 16,181	$2,095,376
March 3, 2019	Brooklyn	United States	Barclays Center	Sheck Wes	15,486 / 15,486	$1,654,921
March 5, 2019	Montreal	Canada	Bell Centre	Sheck Wes	14,337 / 15,956	$1,179,350
March 8, 2019	Edmonton	Canada	Rogers Place	Sheck Wes	16,339 / 16,339	$1,472,771
March 9, 2019	Hartford	United States	XL Center	Sheck Wes	13,139 / 13,139	$826,248
March 12, 2019	Washington, D.C.	United States	Capital One Arena	Sheck Wes	12,292 / 14,917	$1,088,630
March 14, 2019	Jacksonville	United States	Jacksonville Veterans Memorial Arena	Sheck Wes	9,664 / 11,590	$707,427
March 15, 2019	Orlando	United States	Amway Center	Sheck Wes	12,587 / 13,282	$994,354
March 17, 2019	Tampa	United States	Amalie Arena	Sheck Wes	15,245 / 15,245	$913,270
March 20, 2019	Nashville	United States	Bridgestone Arena	Sheck Wes	13,370 / 14,051	$894,349
March 22, 2019	Atlanta	United States	State Farm Arena	Sheck Wes	11,593 / 11,593	$1,084,881
March 24, 2019	Charlotte	United States	Spectrum Center	Sheck Wes	16,386 / 16,386	$845,551
March 26, 2019	Tulsa	United States	BOK Center	Sheck Wes	12,425 / 13,231	$869,968
Europe
July 16, 2019	London	United Kingdom	The O_{2} Arena	Octavian	17,236 / 17,236	$1,479,640
Total					764,236 / 848,197	$63,715,185

== Cancelled shows ==
List of cancelled concerts, showing date, city, country, venue, and reason for cancellation
Date	City	Country	Venue	Reason
February 28, 2019	Buffalo	United States	KeyBank Center	Personal reasons, rescheduled to March 10, 2019
