= Like a Good Old Friend =

Like A Good Old Friend

EP by Vegyn
- Released: 19 March 2021
- Genre: Electronic; hip-hop; glitch hop
- Length: 23:25
- Label: PLZ Make It Ruins

Vegyn chronology
Only Diamonds Cut Diamonds (2019)	Like A Good Old Friend (2021)	Don't Follow Me Because I'm Lost Too!! (2022)

Like A Good Old Friend is an extended play (EP) by British electronic artist Vegyn. It was released on 19 March 2021, and received generally positive reviews from critics.

== Release ==
The EP was announced on 18 February 2021, at the same time as the release of "I See You Sometimes", its lead single, which featured Jeshi. On 10 March, the second single "B4 The Computer Crash" was released.

It was released on 19 March 2021 by Vegyn's label PLZ Make It Ruins.

== Reception ==
Writing for Pitchfork, Eric Torres praised the EP's sound, stating "the music channels its volatile energy into a more approachable side of Vegyn’s sound, with joyful house beats and emotive production that gives way to some of his catchiest melodies yet", however criticised it for sometimes relying "more on mood than melody". NME gave the album 3 out of 5 stars, with their reviewer Charlotte Krol calling it "his most refined work yet", while Resident Advisor's Jemima Skala said the EP is "subtly experimental, melding accessible melodies with moments of weirdness that open the door to another world".

== Track listing ==
All tracks are written by Vegyn.

No.	Title	Length
1.	"I See You Sometimes" (featuring Jeshi)	3:05
2.	"Like A Good Old Friend"	2:23
3.	"So Much Time - So Little Time" (featuring John Glacier)	3:15
4.	"B4 The Computer Crash"	4:18
5.	"Mushroom Abolitionist"	4:44
6.	"Sometimes I Feel Like I'm Ruining Songs"	4:23
Total length:		23:25
