= Only Diamonds Cut Diamonds =

2019 studio album by Vegyn

Studio album by Vegyn
- Released: 8 November 2019
- Recorded: January – November 2018
- Studios: Heavy Duty; The Swamp
- Genres: Electronica; IDM; instrumental hip-hop; glitch hop
- Length: 41:40
- Label: PLZ Make It Ruins

Vegyn chronology
Text While Driving If You Want To Meet God! (2019)	Only Diamonds Cut Diamonds (2019)	Like a Good Old Friend (2021)

Only Diamonds Cut Diamonds is the debut studio album by British electronic artist Vegyn. Released on 8 November 2019 by PLZ Make It Ruins, it received positive reviews from critics. The album is Vegyn's first major release as an artist, and comes after he initially gained attention through his work as a producer for artists including Frank Ocean, James Blake, and Travis Scott.

The album was recorded throughout 2018, with large portions created in a studio in Los Angeles. Stylistically, it consists primarily of instrumental hip-hop, and heavily incorporates sampling and field recordings, many of which were recorded on his mobile phone. Its cover features an image of Vegyn as a child. It was promoted through several singles, all of which were accompanied by music videos featuring street dancers.

Critics reviewed the album positively, with scores of 8/10 and 8.1/10 from Crack and Paste respectively. Praise focused in particular on its textural richness, as well as the evocative nature of its production.

== Background ==
I wanted to stay away from a "producer" album. I always thought that was really shit, really boring, and really safe. I didn't want it to be a series of songs that didn't make a placement with somebody else and now I'm getting features on the whole thing. I didn't want to sell it on its features.

— Vegyn on his methodology while creating Only Diamonds Cut Diamonds.

Only Diamonds Cut Diamonds was released 5 months after Vegyn's last work. Text While Driving If You Want To Meet God!, a 71-track mixtape which was described as "sprawling" by Hypebeast, was mainly intended to put much of his unfinished, throwaway tracks to use. Vegyn said of Text While Driving that "It was just sitting on my computer. I could let it rot in the digital coffin, or I could kind of just like let it live as is". Only Diamonds was intended to be a more focused affair, centred around a richer collection of ideas.

Production of the album began in January 2018, and concluded in November of that year. After developing a set of initial ideas across two or three weeks, Vegyn went on to refine individual tracks from that period over the course of eleven months, often going long periods without working on the album. A significant amount of the album was recorded over three or four weeks in a friend's studio in Los Angeles, usually in the middle of the night.

== Composition and style ==
The album has been compared to Memphis rap beats and ambient techno, as well as to video game music. Work by Justice, Daft Punk, Crystal Castles, Boards of Canada, and Autechre inspired the album's creation. It makes heavy use of sampling and field recordings, many of which were recorded on Vegyn's Motorola Razr cellphone. Vegyn has described the album as having a "happy melancholia" to it, and has placed it "within the realm of electronica", though he has also been hesitant to define it as falling under any specific genre. He has also been evasive regarding the equipment used to produce the album, preferring to "leave some mystery" in the process. A blanket released as official merchandise alongside the album depicts the song "Debold" as having been produced in Logic Pro.

The album has relatively few guest vocalists, as Vegyn wanted to avoid being overly reliant on featured artists. It contains only three credited features – "Nauseous / Devilfish" features American rapper JPEGMafia, "I Don't Owe U NYthing" contains a verse by British artist Jeshi, and "You Owe Me" includes a verse by French rapper Retro X. There are several other artists who appear on the album uncredited; rapper Freddie Gibbs contributed vocals to "Fire Like Tyndall", and Owen Pallett, professionally known as Final Fantasy, provided strings on several tracks, notably "It's Nice to Be Alive".

"Cowboy ALLSTAR"
Cowboy ALLSTAR features a number of prominent samples of horses.

The album opens with "Blue Verb", which features woozy synths and echoing percussion, centered around a sample of "Smoked Out, Loced Out" by Three 6 Mafia. Tempo and structure varies substantially throughout the album's tracks – "Nauseous / Devilfish" begins energetically, before relaxing into a string section towards the end, which Vegyn cited as an example of "build[ing] ... juxtapositions in the same tracks, trying to make it its own little world." Similarly, Cowboy ALLSTAR gets "faster and faster the whole way through", and was described in a review as "as profound a track that samples a whinnying horse can be". "Thoughts Of Offing One" is built around gunshot samples and warping synths. Vegyn has identified "Debold" as his favourite from the album, which has been compared to Aphex Twin, and is as of 2025 the most-streamed track from the release.

== Cover ==
The album's cover art includes an image of Vegyn as a child, sitting on his father Phil Thornalley's shoulders while on a trip to the Natural History Museum in London. In an interview, he said of the cover that "A lot of kids growing up in London have exactly the same photo". In another interview, he stated that:

It's nice to have these shared pictures or experiences because we live in such a hyper-connected society that actually feels devoid of any real connections. This is why I tend to gravitate to things more lighthearted and friendly, even though my music has a lot of sadness.

— Vegyn, in an interview

== Release ==
Two tracks from the album, "Cowboy ALLStar" and "Blue Verb", were released to YouTube on 1 August 2019, prior to its announcement, with accompanying music videos. All music videos released in connection with the album feature people dancing in public spaces.

The album was officially announced on 25 September 2019, at the same time as the release of its lead single, "Nauseous / Devilfish" featuring rapper JPEGMafia. The same day, a music video for the song was released to YouTube. In the lead-up to the album's release, music videos for "It's Nice To Be Alive" and "Debold" were also released, on 17 October and 8 November respectively. On 8 November 2019, the album was released by Vegyn's label PLZ Make It Ruins.

Just under a year later, on 14 August 2020, a 5-track extended play (EP) titled ODCD Alt Versions was released, containing a selection of remixed and reimagined versions of tracks from Only Diamonds. Notably, the EP featured a remix of "Debold" by American artist Mk.gee, who told The Fader he had struggled to work on the track as it was his favourite from the album, and that he "knew the song inside-out before working on it".

== Reception ==
Professional ratings
Review scores
Source	Rating
Crack	8/10
Paste	8.1/10
Q	4/5 stars

In a review for Paste, Harry Todd compared the album to Frank Ocean's albums Endless (2016) and Blonde (2016), both of which featured Vegyn as a producer. He wrote that "like both, the album revels in immaculately juxtaposed textures". Hunter Reed for the Daily Emerald said of the album "There are hardly any low points, and its variance in instrumentation, samples and mood have depth and space for multiple listens". Joe Goggins of Crack gave the album a score of 8 out of 10, comparing it favourably to Vegyn's previous project: "Only Diamonds Cut Diamonds is an altogether more refined affair, underpinned by a quickly-established sonic palette that encompasses woozy synths, scratchy percussion and field recordings". Q awarded the album 4 stars out of 5, with reviewer Katie Hawthorne writing that the album "puts Vegyn’s enigmatic, oddball humour front and centre".

== Track listing ==
All tracks are produced by Vegyn unless otherwise noted. Credits adapted from Tidal.

No.	Title	Music	Length
1.	"Blue Verb"	Hayward Ivy; Joseph Winger Thornalley; Sakata Kareem Otis; Three 6 Mafia	2:22
2.	"Nauseous / Devilfish" (featuring JPEGMafia)	Barrington DeVaughn Hendricks; Thornalley	2:23
3.	"That Ain't No Dang Cat!"	Ben Reed; Thornalley	1:36
4.	"Aspenz"	Thornalley	2:38
5.	"Cowboy ALLSTAR"	Buddy Ross; Thornalley	4:07
6.	"Thoughts Of Offing One"	Thornalley	2:03
7.	"Debold"	Thornalley	2:43
8.	"Fake Life" (add. production by Duval Timothy)	Duval Timothy; Thornalley	3:14
9.	"I Don't Owe U NYthing"	Jesse Nathaniel Greenway Bailey; Thornalley	1:57
10.	"Fire Like Tyndall"	Freddie Gibbs; Thornalley; Teo Halm; William Conall Shea	2:17
11.	"Unknown, Forever Unknown"	Thornalley	2:21
12.	"Retro OTW"	Thornalley	2:37
13.	"When I Strike..."	Thornalley	2:40
14.	"You Owe Me" (featuring Retro X)	Bryan Masunda; Thornalley	2:57
15.	"It's Nice to Be Alive"	Thornalley	3:25
16.	"Blue Verb Reprise"	Thornalley; Sachi Di Serafino; Otis	2:11
Total length:			41:40

== Personnel ==
Credits sourced from Bandcamp.

- Matt Colton – Mastering
- Emmett Cruddas – A&R
- Stephane Poux – A&R
- Theo Lalic – MGMT
- Bryan Rivera – Graphic design
- Isha Dipika – Graphic design
- Vegyn – Graphic design
- Julie Thornalley – Album cover photography
