= NC-17 (disambiguation) =

NC-17 is a rating of the Motion Picture Association film rating system indicating that the film is unsuitable for viewing by individuals under 17.

NC-17 may also refer to:

- North Carolina Highway 17
- "NC-17", a song by Travis Scott from Astroworld
