= The Road to Hell Is Paved with Good Intentions (album) =

Studio album by Vegyn
- Released: 5 April 2024
- Genre: Electro-pop
- Length: 45:45
- Label: PLZ Make It Ruins
- Producer: Vegyn

Vegyn chronology
Don't Follow Me Because I'm Lost Too!! (2022)	The Road to Hell Is Paved with Good Intentions (2024)

My intention with titles is to either be fun or provoke thought. I guess that's the idea behind this record, it's an invitation to think about it for yourself. I find all the best works are things that inspire the viewer or the listener to reflect on themselves. I've met a lot of people at shows who tell me their theories on the music, and I always think it's great. I love hearing those because a lot of the time they don't get it, but I think it's really cool that they've interpreted it that way.

— Vegyn on the title and themes of The Road to Hell Is Paved with Good Intentions

The Road to Hell Is Paved with Good Intentions is the second studio album by British electronic musician Vegyn, released on 5 April 2024. It has received positive reviews by critics.

== Reception ==
In a profile for Alternative Press, Dale W. Eisinger called this release "a smart record" that "brings a sense of promise through its 13 tracks". Writing at Clash, Jay Fullarton scored this album an 8 out of 10, ending "this record doesn't sound like a hellscape though, it somehow chases the ecstasy high his debut set and exceeds it in the process".The Observer's Damien Morris scored this release 3 out of 5 stars, placing this in the middle of Vegyn's catalogue in terms of quality and ended, "if you enjoy its combination of fractured storytelling and long instrumental passages, you'll appreciate the consistent quality of the simpler songs around it". Writing for Pitchfork, Dash Lewis scored this release a 7.1 out of 10 and called this "[Joseph] Thornalley's most crowd-pleasing project to date, even if it isn't his most cohesive". Ted Davis of Paste scored this album a 7.2 out of 10, praising the music's range as it "casually flips between the heady and accessible sides of the Vegyn coin".

In Resident Advisor, Reid BG stated that this music "reads more like a slow-burning novel, with sustained, fleshed-out ideas" and characterized this as "an impressive, mainstream-baiting heel turn from the leftfield UK producer that occasionally pulls too many punches". A feature on Vegyn for Rolling Stone included Sam Davies calling this album "45 minutes of lovely electronic music that will soothe your ears in much the way a good meme can soothe the eyes after a few minutes of reading the news". In Spin, Margaret Farrell gave the album an A, writing that it is "both melancholic and euphoric" with music that spans "from jazzy and transcendental to glitchy and trip-hop symphonic". Variety's Jem Aswad considered The Road to Hell Is Paved with Good Intentions "heavenly electro-pop" and compared to Vegyn's previous work, older material has "never been quite as focused or finely honed as it is here".

== Track listing ==
All tracks are produced by Vegyn. Credits adapted from Tidal.

No.	Title	Music	Length
1.	"A Dream Goes On Forever" (featuring John Glacier)	Joseph Thornalley; Shannon Foster	4:39
2.	"Another 9 Days" (featuring Ethan P. Flynn)	Ethan P. Flynn; Thornalley; Loraine James	3:06
3.	"Turn Me Inside" (featuring Léa Sen)	Thornalley; Luke Fenton; Léa Sen	2:54
4.	"Halo Flip" (featuring Lauren Adler)	Elliott Johnson; Thornalley; James	6:55
5.	"Everything Is the Same"	Jezmi Fehmi; Thornalley; Samuel Fenton; Tyson McVey	2:22
6.	"The Path Less Traveled"	Thornalley	3:44
7.	"Makeshift Tourniquet"	Thornalley	5:17
8.	"Time Well Spent"	Thornalley; James	3:00
9.	"In the Front" (featuring John Glacier)	Thornalley; Foster	3:47
10.	"Trust" (featuring Matt Maltese)	Duval Timothy; Thornalley; Matt Maltese	2:11
11.	"Stress Test"	Thornalley; Fenton	2:07
12.	"Last Night I Dreamt I Was Alone"	Thornalley; James	3:26
13.	"Unlucky for Some..."	Thornalley	1:17
Total length:			45:45

== Personnel ==
- Vegyn – instrumentation, mixing, production
- Lauren Auder – music on "Halo Flip"
- Ethan P. Flynn – music on "Another 9 Days"
- John Glacier – music on "A Dream Goes On Forever" and "In the Front"
- Matt Maltese – music on "Trust"
- Isha D. Pika – artwork
- Léa Sen – music on "Turn Me Inside"
- Beau Thomas – audio mastering at Ten Eight Seven Mastering

== See also ==
- 2024 in British music
- List of 2024 albums
