= J Beatzz =

American record producer

JBeatzz
- Born: Joshua Adams; Hartford, Connecticut, U.S.
- Education: Full Sail University (2006)
- Known for: Record producer; audio engineer; DJ

Joshua Adams, professionally known as J Beatzz, is an American hip hop record producer. He holds production credits on Travis Scott's Astroworld (2018), which was nominated for a Grammy Award in 2019 for Best Rap Album.

== Early life ==
Joshua Adams was born in Hartford, and raised in New London. In 2006, he graduated from Full Sail University where he studied audio engineering. After graduation, he moved to Atlanta, where he began working with Big Boi at Stankonia Studios.

== Career ==
In 2010, J Beatzz received his first placement contributing to Big Boi of Outkast's debut solo studio album, Sir Luscious Left Foot, producing the record "General Patton". The record was featured and revamped during the NFL Playoffs in 2011. In 2018, J Beatzz contributed to Travis Scott's third studio album Astroworld producing "Stop Trying To Be God". Astroworld was nominated for Best Rap Album at the 2019 Grammy Awards, and as of 2021 is certified 4× Platinum by the Recording Industry Association of America (RIAA). Also in 2018, he produced the tracks "Coco Chanel" (featuring Foxy Brown) and "Inspirations Outro" from Nicki Minaj's fourth studio album Queen. On January 11, 2019, the RIAA announced Queen as certified platinum.
