= Wake Up (Travis Scott song) =

Single by Travis Scott featuring the Weeknd

from the album Astroworld
- Released: March 26, 2019
- Genre: R&B
- Length: 3:51
- Label: Grand Hustle; Epic; Cactus Jack
- Songwriters: Jacques Webster II; Abel Tesfaye; Adam Feeney; Rupert Thomas, Jr.; Nima Jahanbin; Paimon Jahanbin; Michael Dean; Kaan Güneşberk
- Producers: Frank Dukes; Sevn Thomas; Wallis Lane; John Mayer

Travis Scott singles chronology
"First Off" (2019)	"Wake Up" (2019)	"Chopstix" (2019)

The Weeknd singles chronology
"Lost in the Fire" (2019)	"Wake Up" / "Price on My Head" (2019)	"Power Is Power" (2019)

Music video
- "Wake Up" on YouTube

"Wake Up" (stylized in all caps) is a song by American rapper Travis Scott, featuring vocals by Canadian singer-songwriter the Weeknd. It was released on March 26, 2019, as the fourth and final single from Scott's third studio album, Astroworld (2018).

== Background and release ==
The song was originally supposed to be included in the Weeknd's 2018 EP My Dear Melancholy. However, the song was later given to Scott, to be included on his third studio album Astroworld. Following the release of the aforementioned album's third single "Yosemite", "Wake Up" was sent to rhythmic contemporary radio on March 26, 2019, as Astroworld's fourth single. As of 2026, it remains included on SiriusXM channel The Heat (46)'s playlist.

== Composition ==
Over an ambient guitar beat, "Wake Up" is in the key of B Minor at 149 BPM.

== Critical reception ==
"Wake Up" received positive reviews from critics, with many praising the acoustic production of the track and its fusion of the Weeknd's and Scott's vocals. Tesfaye's vocal delivery and Sevn Thomas' guitar hook were also subject to appraise.

== Commercial performance ==
"Wake Up" initially entered the Billboard Hot 100 at number 30 on the issue dated August 18, 2018, where it became the seventh highest charting song from the album. The track then charted at 71 for an additional week before falling off the Hot 100. Following its release as a single, "Wake Up" managed to chart an additional five weeks in the summer of 2019, where it reached a position of 82. The song also became Scott's sixth number-one on Billboard's Rhythmic Songs chart and would have been the Weeknd's tenth number-one if credited on the chart.

== Music video ==
The official music video for the song was directed by Jonah Hill, and was released on July 25, 2019. It features Scott walking through a mansion filled with sleeping people, that is gradually losing gravity in its interior and exterior. A black and white tint is also present throughout the entire video. The Weeknd and his respective bridge and chorus at the end of the song, do not appear in the video.

== Charts ==
=== Weekly charts ===
Chart (2018–2019)	Peak position
Australia (ARIA)	67
Canada Hot 100 (Billboard)	27
France (SNEP)	96
Netherlands (Single Top 100)	100
New Zealand (Recorded Music NZ)	28
Sweden (Sverigetopplistan)	93
UK Audio Streaming (Official Charts)	64
US Billboard Hot 100	30
US Hot R&B/Hip-Hop Songs (Billboard)	21
US Pop Airplay (Billboard)	25
US R&B/Hip-Hop Airplay (Billboard)	30
US Rhythmic Airplay (Billboard)	1

=== Year-end charts ===
Chart (2018)	Position
US Hot R&B Songs (Billboard)	40
Chart (2019)	Position
US Hot R&B Songs (Billboard)	25
US Rhythmic (Billboard)	20

== Certifications ==
Region	Certification	Certified units/sales
Australia (ARIA)	Platinum	70,000^{‡}
Brazil (Pro-Música Brasil)	2× Platinum	80,000^{‡}
Canada (Music Canada)	2× Platinum	160,000^{‡}
Denmark (IFPI Danmark)	Gold	45,000^{‡}
New Zealand (RMNZ)	Platinum	30,000^{‡}
United Kingdom (BPI)	Silver	200,000^{‡}
United States (RIAA)	2× Platinum	2,000,000^{‡}
^{‡} Sales+streaming figures based on certification alone.

== Release history ==
Region	Date	Format	Label	Ref.
United States	March 26, 2019	Rhythmic contemporary	Grand Hustle; Epic; Cactus Jack	
United States	April 16, 2019	Contemporary hit radio	Grand Hustle; Epic; Cactus Jack	
