= Vegyn =

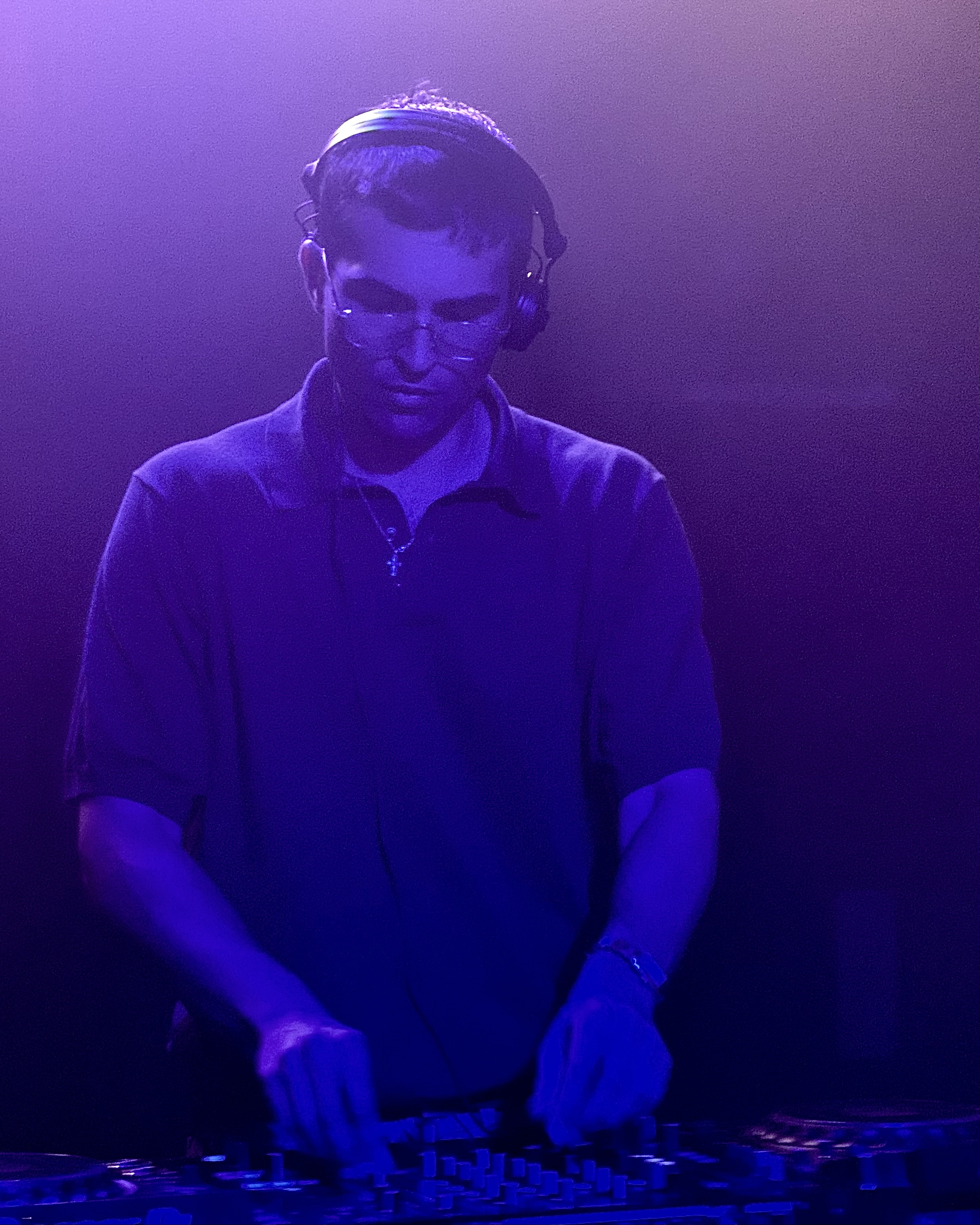
- Vegyn performing in Dublin, Ireland in 2025

Background information
- Also known as: Headache
- Born: Joseph Winger Thornalley
- Origin: London, England
- Genres: Electronic; hip hop; glitch hop; IDM
- Occupations: Record producer; musician; disc jockey; graphic designer
- Years active: 2013–present
- Label: PLZ Make It Ruins
- Website: plz.world

Joseph Winger Thornalley, known professionally as Vegyn, is a British music producer, DJ and graphic designer. He is best known for his production work on Frank Ocean's 2016 albums Blonde and Endless.

== Career ==
Vegyn was born in London. His mother Julie Thornalley worked as a graphic designer, and his father is musician and songwriter Phil Thornalley. He began performing in 2013 while studying design at the London College of Communication, teaching himself how to make boom bap beats after encouragement from fellow musicians. He later left university to focus on music and created the electronic music label PLZ Make It Ruins, which released his debut extended play All Bad Things Have Ended – Your Lunch Included and the compilation tape PLZ Vol. 1 featuring underground London producers.

Around the same time, he met fellow music producer James Blake during a 1-800 Dinosaur event at the now-closed London nightclub Plastic People. Vegyn gave him a USB of songs he had made under the Vegyn moniker. Blake later played these songs on BBC Radio in 2014.

Vegyn met Frank Ocean at the Plastic People club and was flown out to do production work on Ocean's studio albums Blonde and Endless. He also hosted Ocean's Blonded Radio in 2017 and played one of his PrEP+ nights in New York in 2019. Vegyn has since contributed to albums such as Travis Scott's UTOPIA and Astroworld, and JPEGMafia's All My Heroes Are Cornballs.

In 2019, he released the 71 track mixtape Text While Driving If You Want To Meet God!. Later that year, he released his debut studio album Only Diamonds Cut Diamonds featuring guest appearances from rappers JPEGMafia, Retro X, and Jeshi.

In May 2023 he released the album The Head Hurts but the Heart Knows the Truth under the name Headache. The record is credited to Vegyn as producer and mixer, with lyrics written by Francis Hornsby Clark. Some listeners speculated that the vocals on the album were produced using AI, and that Clark himself may not exist, owing to his lack of social media presence. Vegyn confirmed that the vocals were AI-produced, but insisted that Clark was real, a friend he has known for years who keeps a low public profile. In October 2025 a second Headache album was released, titled Thank You for Almost Everything.

Vegyn debuted his AV Live show at Fuji Rock Festival in Japan, sold out his London show at EartH two months in advance, and played select US dates including The Fonda Theatre in Los Angeles and Webster Hall in New York. In April 2024, he released his second album, The Road to Hell Is Paved with Good Intentions.

== Discography ==
=== Studio albums ===
As Vegyn

- All Bad Things Have Ended – Your Lunch Included (2014)
- Janhui (2015)
- Text While Driving If You Want to Meet God! (2019)
- Only Diamonds Cut Diamonds (2019)
- Like a Good Old Friend (2021)
- Don't Follow Me Because I'm Lost Too!! (2022)
- The Road to Hell Is Paved with Good Intentions (2024)
- Blue Moon Safari (with Air, 2025)

As Headache

- The Head Hurts but the Heart Knows the Truth (2023)
- Thank You for Almost Everything (2025)

=== Production credits ===
List of selected production credits
Release	Year	Artist(s)	Details
Blonde	2016	Frank Ocean	Track 9: "Nights" (co-producer); Track 13: "Close to You" (drums)
Good For You	2017	Aminé	Track 6: "STFU" (co-producer)
Cozy Tapes Vol. 2: Too Cozy	2017	A$AP Mob	Track 16: "Raf" (co-producer)
"Provider"	2017	Frank Ocean	Co-producer, drums
Astroworld	2017	Travis Scott	Track 11: "Astrothunder" (additional production)
Endless	2018	Frank Ocean	Executive producer
All My Heroes Are Cornballs	2019	JPEGMafia	Track 7: "Rap Grow Old & Die x No Child Left Behind" (co-producer)
To Feel Alive	2020	Kali Uchis	Track 1: "Honey Baby (Spoiled!)" (co-producer)
SHILOH: Lost For Words	2021	John Glacier	Executive producer
Nymph	2022	Shygirl	Track 10: "Honey" (co-writer, co-producer)
Running in Waves	2022	George Riley	Executive producer
Utopia	2023	Travis Scott	Track 4: "My Eyes" (co-producer); Track 13: "Parasail" (co-producer)
JackBoys 2	2025	JackBoys / Travis Scott	Track 1: "JB2 Radio" (co-producer); Track 3: "2000 Excursion" (co-producer)
