= Sir Lucious Left Foot: The Son of Chico Dusty =

Studio album by Big Boi
- Released: July 5, 2010
- Recorded: 2007–10
- Studio: Stankonia (Atlanta)
- Genres: Hip-hop; funk
- Length: 57:05
- Labels: Purple Ribbon; Def Jam South
- Producers: Big Boi; André 3000; DJ Cutmaster Swiff; DJ Speedy; J Beatzz; Lil Jon; Malay; Mr. DJ; Organized Noize; Royal Flush; Salaam Remi; Scott Storch; Terrence "Knightheet" Culbreath

Big Boi chronology
Sir Lucious Left Foot: The Son of Chico Dusty (2010)	Vicious Lies and Dangerous Rumors (2012)

Alternative cover
- Limited edition double LP

Singles from Sir Lucious Left Foot: The Son of Chico Dusty
- 1. "Shutterbugg" Released: April 26, 2010; 2. "Follow Us" Released: July 20, 2010

Sir Lucious Left Foot: The Son of Chico Dusty is the debut studio album by American rapper Big Boi, released on July 5, 2010, by Purple Ribbon Records and Def Jam South Recordings. It is his first solo album, following his work as a member of the hip-hop duo OutKast. Production for the album took place primarily at Stankonia Recording Studio in Atlanta during 2007 to 2010 and was handled by several record producers, including Organized Noize, J Beatzz, Scott Storch, Salaam Remi, Mr. DJ, and André 3000.

Rooted in Southern hip-hop and funk music, Sir Lucious Left Foot features a bounce and bass-heavy sound, layered production, and assorted musical elements. Its lyrics deal with boasting, sex, social commentary, and club themes, featuring Big Boi's clever wordplay and versatile flow. The album's title is a long-time moniker for the rapper, who has said it also reflected his maturity as a musician by the time of the album.

The album's development was impeded by a dispute between Big Boi and his former label, Jive Records, over creative and commercial differences. Following a heavily delayed release, it debuted at number three on the US Billboard 200, selling 62,000 copies in its first week, eventually selling 175,000 copies. It also charted internationally and was marketed with the release of two singles, including the UK top-40 hit "Shutterbugg", and an international tour by Big Boi through late 2010. Sir Lucious Left Foot received widespread acclaim from critics, who praised its varied sound and Big Boi's lyricism, later including it on numerous top-album lists for the year.

== Background ==
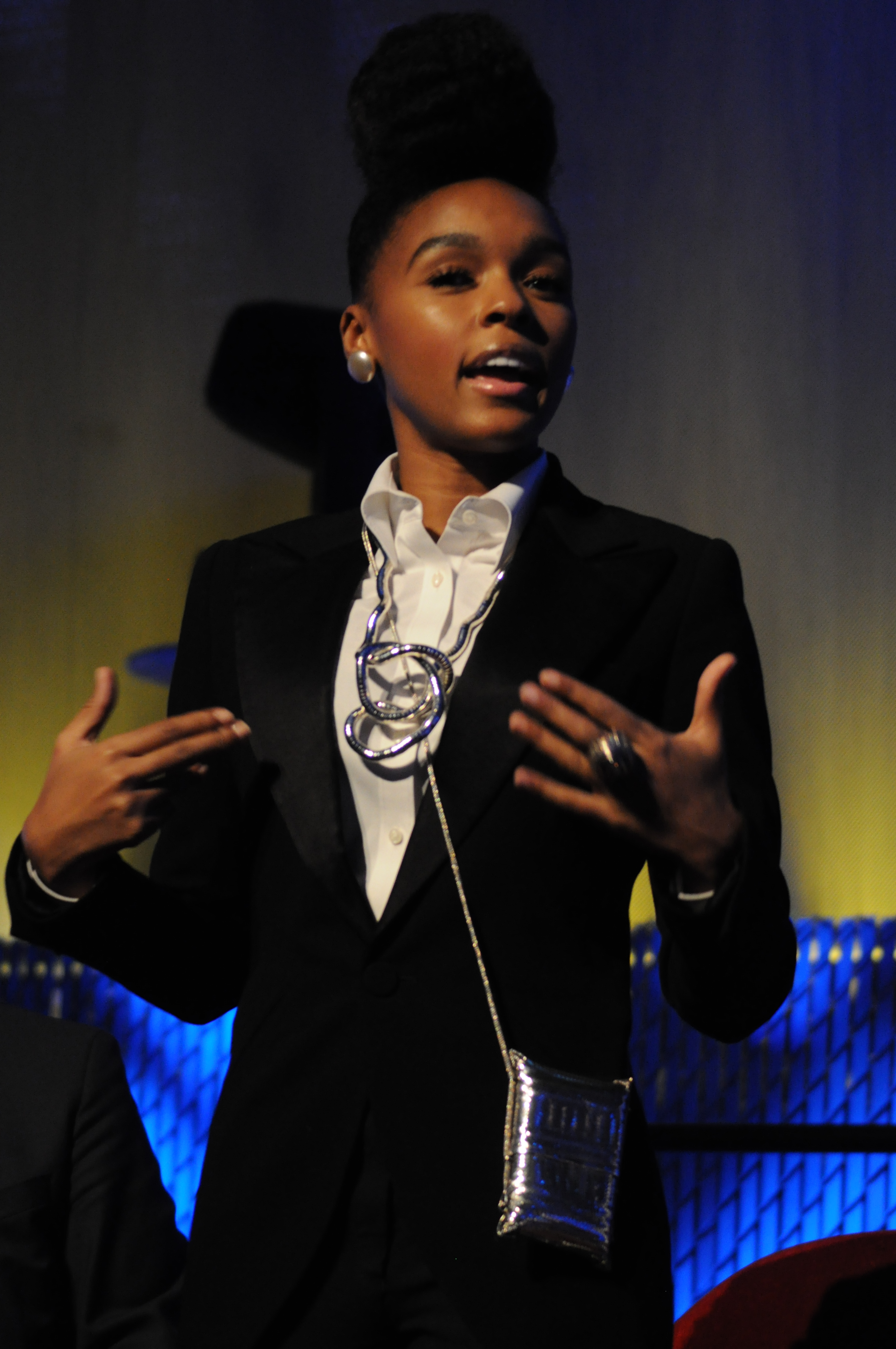
Janelle Monáe worked with Big Boi before contributing to the album.

In 2004, the hip-hop duo OutKast's original record label Arista Records was restructured under the Jive label group, which released the duo's sixth album Idlewild (2006). Accompanied by the musical film of the same name, the project was met with a lukewarm reception from critics and audiences. Amid break-up rumors, Big Boi and André 3000 announced their hiatus as a duo and plans for solo career work.

During their hiatus, Big Boi and André 3000 were pressured by Jive to produce an OutKast album instead of focusing on their solo work. Unlike their fifth album Speakerboxxx/The Love Below, which included a solo album by each member, Big Boi and André 3000 planned to have each of their solo albums sold separately, while intending to continue work as a duo after the solo projects would be released. Before working on his debut solo album, Big Boi was managing his Purple Ribbon imprint label and performing several acting roles, including a supporting role as a drug dealer in the coming-of-age film ATL (2006) and the lead role as a rap mogul in the comedy film Who's Your Caddy? (2007). In an interview with Vibe, he said that due to the Writers' Strike at the time his further work in film would be on hold and expressed plans for new music.

After being approached by artistic director John McFall in 2007, Big Boi collaborated with the Atlanta Ballet company on a production entitled big. As creative director, Big Boi recruited bandmembers, developed a story line, and worked with choreographer Lauri Stallings to put the project together. The production received good buzz and ran for six performances in April 2008 at the Fox Theatre in Atlanta. It featured him in a starring role as himself, a live band of musicians from the Purple Ribbon label, performances by Sleepy Brown and Janelle Monáe, and syncopated dance sequences set to OutKast hits and tracks intended for Big Boi's solo album.

== Recording ==
Sir Lucious Left Foot was recorded over a period of three years, beginning on Martin Luther King, Jr. Day in 2007. Big Boi has said that he "always start working on albums on Martin Luther King Day. It's a good luck charm". The album was primarily recorded at Stankonia Recording Studio in Atlanta, Georgia, the studio used by OutKast for their previous albums. Additional recording took place at The Dungeon Recording Studios, The Slumdrum Dreamhouse, and King of Crunk in Atlanta, Dungeon East Studios in Decatur, Georgia, Instrumental Zoo in Miami, Florida, and Kush Studios in Palm Island, Florida. Big Boi discussed the Stankonia studio's environment in an interview for The Guardian, calling it "comfortable but gritty enough to get you in a state of mind of being raw and ready to kill stuff", while noting that the sessions were accompanied by "some candles, a little red light, maybe some crunk juice and a cigar; every now and then perhaps a little 'purple'". While searching for a new record label, he completed recording for the album. The album was mastered on May 27, 2010.

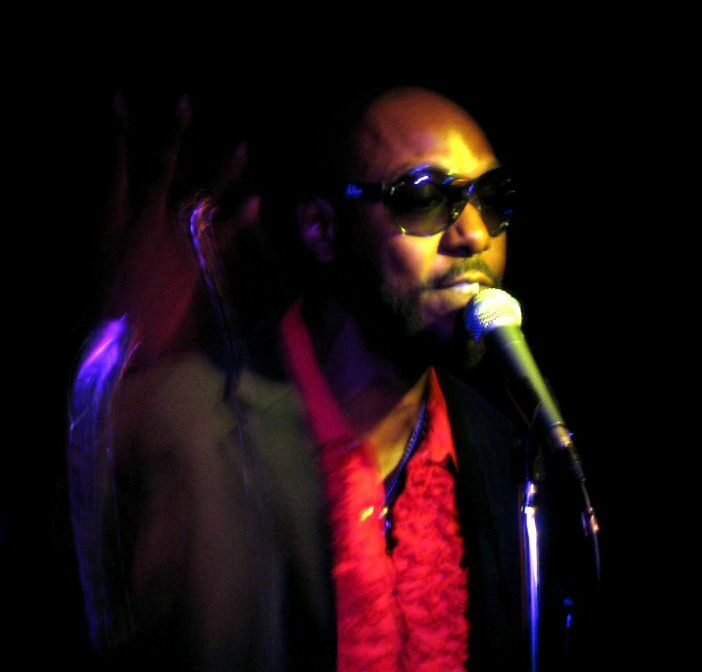
OutKast-collaborator Sleepy Brown contributed production and vocals to the album.

In an August 2010 interview, Big Boi said that he planned to co-produce each of the album's tracks, with production also being handled by Organized Noize, Boom Boom Room Productions, Scott Storch, and Lil Jon. In an interview for Blues & Soul, he discussed working on the beat for "Shutterbugg" after producer Scott Storch had presented him with a preliminary track: "[I] brought my band in – my guitar players, keyboard players, the talkbox – and we just pissed on it! You know, we put the P-Funk on it, and just commenced to lyrically destroy the track".

Big Boi worked on Sir Lucious Left Foot with Sleepy Brown, a musician and frequent OutKast-collaborator who was noted for using synthesizers, electric pianos, samplers, and drum machines in his music. Brown contributed to the album with production as a member of Organized Noize and with vocals to several tracks. Big Boi has said that he incorporated various musical elements to the album, with "something from every genre, every funk, beat, loop, horn, whistle. We got it all on the record". He has described Sir Lucious Left Foot as "a funk-filled extravaganza! You know, layers and layers of funk with raw lyrics and a lotta honesty".

Other artists were enlisted as guest vocalists, such as Jamie Foxx, T.I., and B.o.B. André 3000 was planned to appear on three tracks and produce a track for Yelawolf. Big Boi had been introduced to Yelawolf's music through his younger brother and invited him to record after seeing him perform. He originally proposed a rock-influenced track for Yelawolf, but was persuaded by him to send the instrumental for "You Ain't No DJ". According to Yelawolf, he "wrote like 64 bars and turned in the huge verse", which was edited down to 16 and eight-bar parts of his original verse for the finished song. The track "Follow Us" features Vonnegutt, an act from Big Boi's Purple Ribbon label. Big Boi also attempted unsuccessfully to collaborate with singer-songwriter Kate Bush, but managed to work with funk music pioneer George Clinton on "Fo Yo Sorrows", an experience he related to "Dorothy going to see the Wizard of Oz. He is the grandfather of funk; when George speaks, you listen. He's gonna give you that extraterrestrial funk; you gotta be thankful for the way he beams it down to you".

== Music and lyrics ==
Sir Lucious Left Foot features a layered and voluminous production, which Big Boi has described as "like someone's pushing you around the room". Rooted in Southern hip-hop, it contains a bounce and bass-heavy sound with dense TR 808-driven basslines, live instrumentation, and backing vocalists. Music writer Greg Kot calls it "a state-of-the-art Southern-fried party-funk album" and notes its bass-heavy sound as "full of surface charm, the type of music that is designed to sound big in a club, the soundtrack for a night of excess. But there’s very little conventional about these beats".

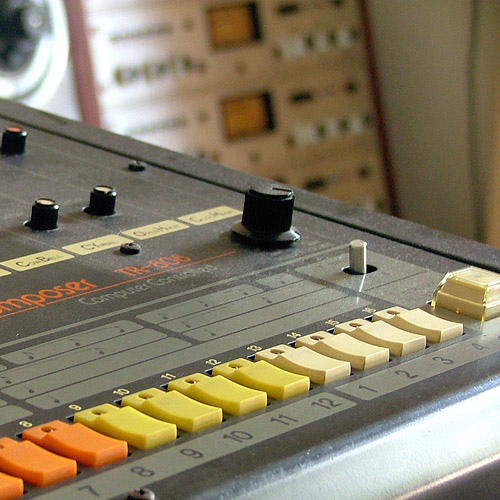
A Roland TR-808 drum machine and synthesizer, a predominant instrument on the album

The album's sound also incorporates diverse musical elements from various genres such as funk, soul, rock, dubstep, and electro music. Houston Press writer Shea Serrano describes the album as a "new take on the traditional Southern rap sound. It's slow and fast, wonky and flimsy, lyrical and hook-driven". Tom Breihan of Pitchfork perceives "1980s synth-funk" as its predominant musical element, but also finds each track musically varied, stating "New melodic elements flit in and out of tracks just as you start to notice them, and there's a lot going on at any given moment". Big Boi has called the music "basically what you been getting from Outkast. Raw lyricism and the funkiest grooves you can lay your ears on."

Big Boi's lyrics are playful and irreverent, with clever wordplay and boasts, while incorporating non-sequiturs, pop culture references, and tongue-twisters. His rhymes are delivered through a fast, versatile flow and dexterous cadence. Rolling Stone's Christian Hoard describes his flow as "inimitably slick and speedy". Amos Barshad of Vulture notes his lyrics as "playful, but his flow is stern and unpredictable". Sasha Frere-Jones of The New Yorker describes the album's mood as "decidedly upbeat" and writes of Big Boi's rapping, "The musical DNA of 'Sir Lucious' lies in a simple strategy that Big Boi has used for years: he often raps in double time, no matter what the tempo of the song is. This means that even the slower songs [...] don’t drag—Big Boi uses the space in the beat to provide another rhythm with his words". Frere-Jones describes him as "simultaneously forceful and careful" with his lyrics and compares his rapping technique to "the clatter of a machine, like a lawnmower, where secondary rhythms whisper underneath the main beat [...] Big Boi is never laid-back when he raps: he defines wide-awake".

Thematically, the album's subject matter mostly concerns self-aggrandisement, sex, social commentary, and "the club". Music writer Omar Burgess comments that the album finds Big Boi "vacillating between a shit-talking B-boy, social commentary spitting vet and a ladies man with a wandering eye". Sarah Rodman of The Boston Globe notes "lissome rhyming about things frivolous and fraught" by Big Boi. NPR Music writer Andrew Noz views that his "spiral of internal rhyme schemes and stop-and-go cadences [...] values style over substance but doesn't neglect writing, whether battling imaginary rap foes or offering advice on fiscal responsibility".

=== Songs ===
"Tangerine"
The strip club-themed track features booming bass, Afro-polyrhythms, synth vamps, and reverbing guitar.

"Turns Me On" has a comical beat and multiple vocals, including 1950s-styled vocals during a break in the song. "Follow Us" features fractured, Afrobeat guitar phrases, sleazy synthesizer, and a pop refrain by Vonnegutt. "Shutterbugg" has a robotic stutter, falsetto refrain, female whispers and described by The Guardian's Hattie Collins as "a futuristic, brain-crunching slice of jittery electro hop". "Tangerine" features blunt lyrics concerning strip club themes and a lascivious guest rap by T.I. The song incorporates various musical elements, including exotic Afro-polyrhythms, psychedelic instrumental effects, booming bass, tribal beats, synthesizer vamps, and slow, reverbing grunge rock guitar. Tom Breihan notes that the song "somehow simultaneously sounds like strip-club ass-shake material and Funkadelic covering Morricone", while music journalist Alexis Petridis writes that it "improbably burst[s] into something that most closely resembles a P-Funk take on the mid-60s Batman theme. The lyrics, meanwhile, come in a breathless blur of druggy non-sequiturs and pop-culture references, some of it frankly baffling". "Fo Yo Sorrows" features funk musician George Clinton performing the hook and has been described as "a seamless blur of old school Atlanta bass, current-day glitch-hop and Funkadelic-style psychedelia".

Several tracks on Sir Lucious Left Foot contain humorous skits with dialogue from additional vocalists, including Chris Carmouche, Dax "Dirty Dr." Rudnak, Big Rube, Henry Welch, and Keisha Atwater. Welch and Carmouche are featured in a skit at the beginning of "Be Still", in which they make a reference to "tea bagging". Dax Rudnak concludes "General Patton" (Produced by J Beatzz) with a skit about a sex maneuver called "the David Blaine", which according to the skit is "when you’re making love to someone from behind, then have a friend take over and you run to a window and wave at your partner". In an interview for Time Out Chicago, Big Boi was asked whether he "[is] taking credit for this, or is this something people do?", to which he responded "Yeah, man! You know, man, they do it now!".

== Title ==
The album's title is derived from Big Boi's longtime moniker "Sir Lucious Left Foot". He has explained part of it as a reference to the Southern slang phrase "get on the good foot", while describing the entire moniker as an indication of maturity, noting it as "my real grown-man persona" and "like my Luke-Skywalker-becoming-a-Jedi persona. Like, I'm just really serious about my craft, I've mastered it, and I'm very skilled at it, and I take pride in making this music". He incorporated the nickname "Chico Dusty" to the album's title as a dedication to his late father, Tony Kearse, who gained it while serving as a fighter pilot in the United States Air Force and Marines. The spelling of luscious in the album's title, Big Boi's moniker, is intended to reflect on its distinctive pronunciation "loo-shuss", which according to Big Boi, is not "the girl name; you call a girl luscious, along the lines of voluptuous".

== Marketing ==
=== Record label ===
In July 2009, Big Boi left Jive Records, following creative differences and the label's unwillingness to release and promote his solo album. According to Big Boi, Jive gave him an ultimatum to shop the album elsewhere. In an interview for GQ, he discussed his release from Jive and his discontent with the label for proposing he record a song similar to Lil Wayne's "Lollipop", stating "They told me to go in and make my version of Lil Wayne's Lollipop! I love that song... But how you gonna tell me to go bite another MCs style?... That's the highest form of disrespect ever. So that's when I wanted to get off Jive. And the only honorable thing they've done is allow me to do that". Big Boi expressed that Jive viewed its intended singles as not "radio-friendly" and the album as "a piece of art, and they didn't know what to do with it".

In a July 2010 interview for MTV, Big Boi said that most of the album's material had been finished while at Jive, stating "It's basically the same album. I could have been done, like, a year ago. But being that we were having creative differences — you know, every time they rejected what I was doing, I would go back in the studio and work on more stuff. The last two songs, 'You Ain't No DJ' and 'Be Still,' were the last two records, but everything else was already on there". Despite his individual release, OutKast as a group remained signed to Jive. After leaving Jive, Big Boi contacted record executive and Island Def Jam CEO/chairman L.A. Reid, who had originally signed OutKast to LaFace in 1992. He played Reid a track from the album, "Fo Yo Sorrows", which persuaded him to actualize a contract for Big Boi. Following two months of negotiations, Big Boi signed a three-album deal with Def Jam Recordings in March 2010.

Big Boi's clash with Jive has essentially been an update on the oldest of music business disputes — between a label's commercial concerns and an artist's creative ones, tensions that have become more acute as the industry grapples with its current financial straits.

— David Peisner, The New York Times

Before his departure from Jive, Big Boi planned to release the album in 2008. In January 2010, he announced a March 23 release through his Twitter account. In April, its release was pushed back to July 6 in the United States. However, in June, Jive attempted to block its release, claiming that Def Jam could not issue songs featuring both Big Boi and André 3000, as OutKast was represented as a duo by the former label. In a June 7 interview for GQ, Big Boi responded to a question concerning the blocking of his recordings with André 3000 for Sir Lucious Left Foot, stating "Au contraire! They cannot block it. Au contraire. Either they're going to do it the right way, or they're going to do it my way... The fans' thirst will be quenched. You know, I'm no stranger to that Internet, baby. So you already know what time it is. The thirst of the fans will be quenched". On June 10, his website released the album's track listing, which excluded tracks featuring André 3000. Of his songs with André 3000, he told GQ, "We're gonna keep one of them for the next OutKast record".

The album was made available for streaming at Big Boi's MySpace page. Following leaks of several of its tracks, the album also leaked in its entirety to the Internet on June 29, 2010. Prior to its official release, anti-piracy companies had estimated that his tracks were being downloaded approximately 45,000 times a day. On July 1, Big Boi self-released his mixtape Mixtape for Dummies: Guide to Global Greatness as a free download through his website, featuring tracks compiled by DJ X-Rated and DJ Esco from Big Boi's solo recordings and work with OutKast.

Sir Lucious Left Foot: The Son of Chico Dusty was released by Big Boi's imprint Purple Ribbons label and Def Jam Recordings on July 5, 2010, in the United Kingdom and on July 6 in the US. A deluxe edition of the album was released simultaneously in the US, with the inclusion of two bonus tracks and a second DVD of music videos for several songs. Big Boi's official website store offered limited edition releases of the album, including the deluxe edition's two discs, ivory white vinyl LPs, a limited edition T-shirt, and a custom GoodWood chain. In promotion of the album's release, Converse produced a special limited edition run of Chuck Taylor All-Stars shoes in August 2010. The shoes were designed by Big Boi himself and feature the album title printed around the outer sides of the shoe's heel. On the collaboration, Big Boi said in a statement "as long as I can remember music and Converse have gone hand in hand, so partnering up with them was a no-brainer".

=== Singles ===
Amid his disputes with Jive, Big Boi leaked two recordings originally intended for Sir Lucious Left Foot as promotional singles to the Internet. The album's first promo single, "Royal Flush" featuring André 3000 and Raekwon, had appeared on various web magazines and blogs in March 2008. It received a Grammy Award nomination for Best Rap Performance by a Duo or Group and was named the best song of 2008 by About.com. Its second promo single, "Sumthin's Gotta Give" featuring Mary J. Blige, was leaked to the Internet along with its music video in June 2008. The Boi-1da-produced track "Lookin' 4 Ya", featuring André 3000 and Sleepy Brown, leaked onto the Internet on June 8. The track's "Jedi Remix" version was released to East Village-based radio show Baller's Eve and subsequently onto the Internet in September 2010. It features the original instrumental with two different verses from both Big Boi and André 3000.

Big Boi leaked the album's first official single, "Shutterbugg", on April 6, 2010. It was officially released as a single on April 26. It was also issued on interactive music site MXP4, which enabled users to play with, mix, remix, and sing along with the track. Its music video was directed by Chris Robinson and premiered on May 26. The video's concept incorporates various scenes that accentuate different lines from Big Boi's lyrics. On its concept, Big Boi said in an interview for MTV, "It goes with the rhymes. Chris Robinson was definitely onboard [with the concept]. What he took from the song was a lyrical, visual adventure. There's a lot of special stuff going on. He's freaking the visuals like I'm freaking the rhymes". "Shutterbugg" spent two weeks on the US R&B/Hip-Hop Songs chart, peaking at number 60, and it charted at number 99 on the US Hot 100 Airplay. It also reached number 31 and spent four weeks on the UK Singles Chart, and at number eight on the Deutsche Black Charts in Germany. Rolling Stone named "Shutterbugg" the 14th best single of 2010. It was nominated for a Grammy Award for Best Rap Performance by a Duo or Group in 2010.

"Fo Yo Sorrows", featuring George Clinton, Too Short, and Sam Chris, was released as a promotional single on June 8, 2010, through iTunes. "General Patton" was also released to iTunes on June 15. Its music video was released on June 13. On August 26, Big Boi's website posted the track's "chopped and screwed" version as a free download. The song "Tangerine", featuring T.I., was released to iTunes on June 29. "Follow Us", featuring Vonnegutt, was released as the second official single on July 20 in the US and September 13 in the UK. A music video for the song was directed by Zach Wolfe and released on July 1. The track was remixed by Vonnegutt and released September 13 through Big Boi's website. The track "You Ain't No DJ" received some airplay on Atlanta-based radio. Its music video was directed by Parris in Atlanta, and released virally on September 2. The video features Big Boi in a red tracksuit and with a lightsaber in one scene, guest rapper Yelawolf lounging on a couch, and several break dancers, while motions in the video's scenes are rewinded and sped up with film editing to accentuate cutting, mixing, and spinning by a DJ in the song.

=== Performances ===
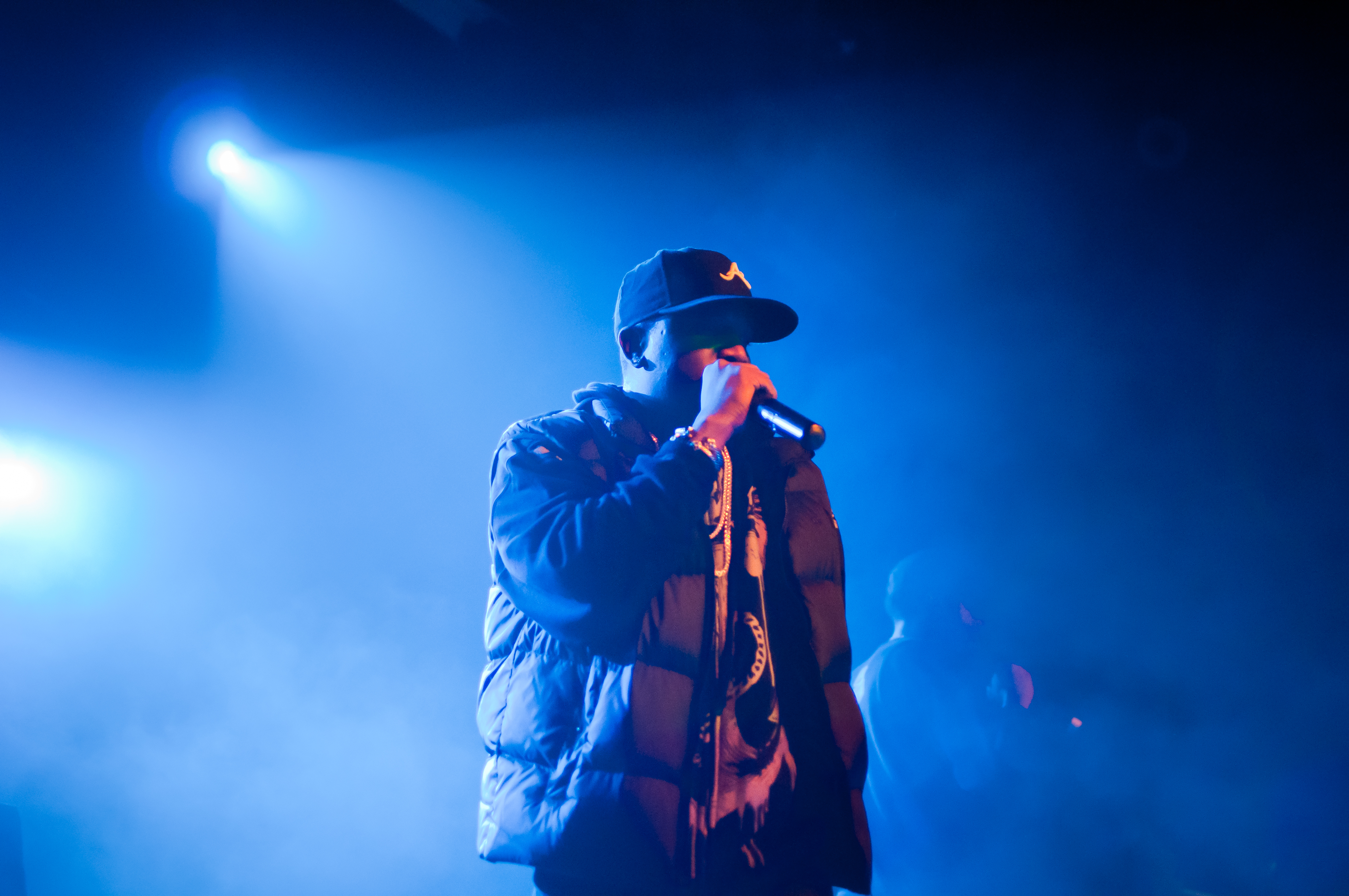
Big Boi performing on tour in Switzerland, November 2010

Big Boi made promotional appearances on The Tonight Show with Jay Leno on July 7, 2010, and Late Night with Jimmy Fallon on July 12, performing the album's lead single "Shutterbugg" on both shows. He also performed its second single "Follow Us" on Lopez Tonight on July 14 and on Late Show with David Letterman on August 23. Big Boi joined the line-up for the Pitchfork Music Festival during June 16–18 in Union Park, Chicago, performing on the festival's third and final day. He performed a set at Acer Arena in Olympic Park, Sydney on July 28 as part of the Australian-based Winterbeatz music festival, and both Øyafestivalen in Oslo, Norway and the Flow Festival in Helsinki, Finland on August 14. On August 18, he played a free show at Sobe Live in Miami, Florida, which MySpace Music broadcast live via Ustream.tv with the MySpace page of HP.

Initially expected through the end of 2010, a supporting 20-concert tour for Sir Lucious Left Foot was announced by Big Boi on August 25. His spokespeople confirmed that he would be performing material from previous OutKast albums in addition to songs from Sir Lucious Left Foot. The tour began on August 26 at the Verizon Wireless Amphitheater in Atlanta, Georgia and concluded on November 18 at Fox Studios in Sydney, Australia.

On September 2, 2010, Big Boi headlined with DJ mashup duo Super Mash Bros the Hawkapolooza, an event at the Memorial Union Iowa City, Iowa inaugurating the start of the college athletic season for the Iowa Hawkeyes. He headlined New York University's annual Mystery Concert at the Skirball Center for Performing Arts in New York City with opening act Dr. Dog on September 7, and performed at the 9:30 Club in Washington, D.C., on September 8. He was billed for the 2010 Epicenter music festival on September 25 at the Auto Club Speedway in Fontana, California. On October 28, Big Boi headlined the Yorktown Throwdown, a benefit show in support of the Boys & Girls Clubs of America. The concert featured electronic music duo MSTRKRFT and was held in the USS Yorktown lot at Patriot's Point in South Carolina.

== Reception ==
=== Sales ===
The album debuted at number three on the US Billboard 200 chart, with first-week sales of 62,000 copies. It also entered at number two on Billboard's Digital Albums and Tastemaker Albums, and at number three on both its Top R&B/Hip-Hop Albums and Top Rap Albums charts. It spent 13 weeks on the Billboard 200 chart, and as of September 26, has sold 175,000 copies in the US, according to Nielsen SoundScan.

In Canada, Sir Lucious Left Foot debuted at number 20 on the Top 100 Albums chart. In the United Kingdom, it entered at number 80 on the Top 100 Albums and at number 14 on the Top 40 Hip Hop and R&B Albums chart. In its second week, it fell out of the Top 100 Albums. The album debuted at number 99 in Switzerland and at number 19 in Norway. In Norway, it reached number 16, its peak position, in its second week on the VG-lista Topp 40 Album chart, on which it ultimately spent eight weeks. In Australia, the album entered at number 33 on the ARIA Top 50 Albums and at number five on the Top 40 Urban Albums chart. In its second week, it dropped out of the Top 50 Albums chart.

=== Reviews ===
Professional ratings
Aggregate scores
Source	Rating
AnyDecentMusic?	7.9/10
Metacritic	90/100
Review scores
Source	Rating
AllMusic	4.5/5 stars
The A.V. Club	A−
Entertainment Weekly	A−
The Guardian	4/5 stars
Los Angeles Times	3.5/4 stars
MSN Music	A−
NME	8/10
Pitchfork	9.2/10
Rolling Stone	3.5/5 stars
Spin	9/10

Sir Lucious Left Foot: The Son of Chico Dusty was met with rave reviews from critics. On Metacritic, which assigns a normalized rating out of 100 to reviews from mainstream critics, the album received an average score of 90 based on 33 reviews, which indicates "universal acclaim". AllMusic editor Andy Kellman called it "one of the loosest, most varied, and entertaining albums of its time". Entertainment Weekly's Simon Vozick-Levinson called the album "a stunningly realized solo debut". Alexis Petridis of The Guardian praised its "kaleidoscopic range of musical influences" and Big Boi's lyrics. Rob Harvilla of The Village Voice called it "fantastic, by turns triumphant, defiant, and gleefully crass [...] it feels triumphant and relieved and epic even if you discount the tortured backstory". Seth Colter Walls of Newsweek stated "Big Boi makes the contemporary trappings of hip-hop sound funkier than just about anyone".

Los Angeles Times writer Ann Powers praised its music's "depth and complexity", adding that it "highlights his focused language skills within musical settings that touch upon rock, electro, dubstep and classical fanfare, grounded in a thick bottom that guarantees plenty of booty bounce". Gregg Lipkin of PopMatters praised the album's "shifting tones and musical invention". Sean Fennessey of Spin praised its bass-heavy tracks and called Big Boi "a deceptively elegant rhymer". Rolling Stone writer Jody Rosen commented on Big Boi's performance, "He's got an inimitably slick and speedy flow and a personality bigger and more forceful than anything his producers can throw at him". Pitchfork's Tom Breihan called the album "inventive, bizarre, joyous, and masterful" and stated "He just does so many things with his voice and cadence, letting his words fall over the snares one moment and fighting upstream against the beat the next [...] blissfully free of both old-man hectoring and drug-rap nihilism".

In a mixed review, Andy Gill of The Independent felt it was "not as immediately engaging" as Big Boi's Speakerboxxx album, noting "a laziness about some of the rhyming". While noting his boastful "lyrical slackening" as a minor flaw, Slant Magazine's Jesse Cataldo found Big Boi "consistently in fine, tongue-tying form" and described the album as "rigidly focused and almost uniformly strong [...] by-the-books hip-hop with just the right proportion of ingredients". In MSN Music, Robert Christgau observed a "pervasive albeit incoherent musicality" and "a succession of enjoyable songs with plenty to offer", but ultimately lamented that, "without OutKast's synergy, few of [Big Boi's] many good moves are slam dunks."

=== Rankings ===
The album appeared on numerous critics' and publications' year-end top albums lists. Chris Yuscavage of Vibe ranked it number eight on his list of the 10 Best Albums of 2010. Paste ranked it number 37 on its 50 Best Albums of 2010 list, calling it "a massive, ambitious album shot through with knee-knocking beats and deft lyrical touches from Outkast's swagger champion... [B]oth a trove of pop jams and a profound piece of artistic experimentation". Nitsuh Abebe of New York named it the fourth best album of 2010 and called it "as forward-thinking as it was charming". The A.V. Club ranked it number seven, NME ranked it number 38, PopMatters ranked it number 10, The Guardian ranked it number 27, The Wire ranked it number 15, and Spin ranked it number 13. Rolling Stone placed it at number 21 on its year-end albums list and called it "a nasty, future-funk odyssey, done the way George Clinton used to do it: stretched-out grooves, cavernous bass boom, gutbucket guitar and thick electro thump, all held together by Big Boi's whiplash rhymes and pimper-than-thou style".

Time ranked the album number nine, with the publication's Claire Suddath writing that "It's an amalgam of beats, chants and raps mixed together with exacting precision. Big Boi deftly jumps between musical styles [...] and his raps come so fast, he seems to never pause for breath". Pitchfork named it the fourth best album of 2010 and stated "[T]he sound of Sir Lucious Left Foot is an exercise in recognizing traditions and pushing them miles ahead. Big Boi crowns it all with a lyrical acumen so detailed and charismatic—acting as benevolent hustler, knuckle-dusting elder statesman, trickster smartass and street-level philosopher". It was voted the sixth-best album in The Village Voice's Pazz & Jop critics' poll for 2010, while 11 songs from the album were included in the poll's singles list, including "Shutterbugg" (number 7), "Shine Blockas" (number 95), and "Follow Us" (number 316). In 2014, the album was named the 79th best album of the decade "so far" in a list by Pitchfork.

== Track listing ==
Information is taken from the album credits.

No.	Title	Writer(s)	Producer(s)	Length
1.	"Feel Me" (intro)		Malay	1:28
2.	"Daddy Fat Sax"	Antwan Patton; David Sheats	Mr. DJ	2:36
3.	"Turns Me On" (featuring Sleepy Brown and Joi)	Patton; Rico Wade; Raymon Murray; Joi Gilliam; Dave Robbins; Wallace Khatib	Organized Noize	3:29
4.	"Follow Us" (featuring Vonnegutt)	Patton; Salaam Remi; Neil Garrard	Salaam Remi	3:35
5.	"Shutterbugg" (featuring Cutty)	Patton; Scott Storch; Ricardo Lewis; Christopher Carmouche	Scott Storch; Big Boi^{[a]}	3:35
6.	"General Patton" (featuring Big Rube)	Patton; Joshua Adams; Ruben Bailey	J Beatzz; Big Boi	3:12
7.	"Tangerine" (featuring T.I. and Khujo Goodie)	Patton; Willie Knighton; Terrence Culbreath; Clifford Harris	Terrence "Knightheet" Culbreath; Big Boi	4:14
8.	"You Ain't No DJ" (featuring Yelawolf)	Patton; André Benjamin; Michael Atha	André 3000	5:31
9.	"Hustle Blood" (featuring Jamie Foxx)	Patton; Jonathan Smith; Sean Garrett; Carmouche; Craig Love	Lil Jon	4:00
10.	"Be Still" (featuring Janelle Monáe)	Patton; Ricky Walker; Jeron Ward; Sharif Wilson; Janelle Robinson; Nathaniel Irvin III	Sharif Wilson	5:10
11.	"Fo Yo Sorrows" (featuring George Clinton, Too Short and Sam Chris)	Patton; Wade; Murray; Samuel Christian; George Clinton, Jr.	Organized Noize; Big Boi^{[a]}	3:42
12.	"Night Night" (featuring B.o.B and Joi)	Patton; Harvey Miller; Gilliam; Bobby Simmons; Clarence Montgomery	DJ Speedy; Big Boi^{[a]}	3:45
13.	"Shine Blockas" (featuring Gucci Mane)	Patton; Radric Davis	DJ Cutmaster Swiff; Big Boi^{[a]}	3:45
14.	"The Train, Pt. 2 (Sir Lucious Left Foot Saves the Day)" (featuring Sam Chris)	Patton; Wade; Murray; Christian; Melanie Smith; David Brown	Organized Noize; Big Boi^{[a]}	5:20
15.	"Back Up Plan"	Patton; Wade; Murray; Mike Patterson	Organized Noize; Big Boi^{[a]}	3:43

Deluxe edition bonus tracks
No.	Title	Writer(s)	Producer(s)	Length
16.	"Theme Song"	Patton; Wade; Murray; Marqueze Ethridge; Dre Allen	Organized Noize; Big Boi^{[a]}	3:48
17.	"Shine Blockas" (remix) (featuring Gucci Mane, Bun B and Project Pat)	Patton; Davis; Gamble; Huff	DJ Cutmaster Swiff; Big Boi^{[a]}	3:46
Total length:				64:39

Notes

- ^{^[a]} signifies a co-producer.

Sample credits

- "Shutterbugg" contains elements of "Back to Life (However Do You Want Me)", written by Nellee Hooper, Beresford Romeo, Caron M. Wheeler, and Simon A. Law, and contains elements of "You Are in My System", written by David Frank and Michael Murphy.
- "General Patton" contains a sample of "Vieni, o guerriero vindice" performed by Giorgio Tozzi, Coro del Teatro dell'Opera di Roma, Orchestra del Teatro dell'Opera di Roma, Sir Georg Solti.
- "Shine Blockas" contains a sample from "I Miss You Part I and II" written by Kenneth Gamble and Leon Huff, as performed by Harold Melvin & The Blue Notes.

== Personnel ==
Information is taken from the album credits.

=== Musicians ===
- Additional keyboards: Kevin Kendricks
- Additional vocals: Keisha Atwater, Marché Butler, Chris Carmouche, Tamiko Hope, Dax "Dirty Dr." Rudnak, Too Short, Tiphanie Watson, Henry Welch
- Background vocals: Debra Killings, Pooh Bear, Teedra Moses
- Bass: Wallace Khatib, Debra Killings
- Drum and music programming: Terrence "Knightheet" Culbreath, DJ Cutmaster Swiff, DJ Speedy, J Beatzz, Mr. DJ, Organized Noize, Salaam Remi, Royal Flush, Scott Storch
- Drum and synth programming: André 3000
- Drums and music creator: Victor Alexander
- Guitar: Craig Love, Donny "Poppa Doc" Mathis, Billy Odum, Mike Patterson, David Whild
- Horns: Hornz Unlimited – Jason Freeman, Jerry Freeman, Richard Owens, Kebbi Williams
- Keyboard: Kevin Kendricks, Dave Robbins, William White
- Lead vocals: Big Boi, B.o.B, Big Rube, Sam Chris, George Clinton, Cutty, Jamie Foxx, Neil Garrard, Gucci Mane, Joi, Khujo Goodie, Janelle Monáe, Sleepy Brown, T.I., Yelawolf
- Organ: Kevin Kendricks
- Percussion: Omar Phillips
- Scratches: DJ Cutmaster Swiff
- Spoken word: Big Rube, Dax "Dirty Dr." Rudnak
- Talk box: Bosko Kante
- Vocals: Big Boi, Sleepy Brown

=== Production ===
- Executive producer – Antwan Andre Patton (Big Boi)
- Associate producers: Chris Carmouche, Jason Geter
- A&R: Big Boi, Chris Carmouche for Purple Ribbon Entertainment
- A&R administration: Tara Bryan
- A&R operations: Leesa D. Brunson
- Album coordination: Dee Dee Murray, Chris Carmouche
- Marketing: Chris Atlas
- Mastered by: Bernie Grundman at Bernie Grundman Mastering, Los Angeles, CA
- Mastering assisted by: Joe Bazzo
- Management: Marcus T. Grant for The Collective
- Art direction and graphic design: Alex Haldi for Bestest Asbestos
- Cover and interior photograph: Jonathan Mannion
- Hair: Robert "The Barber" Poller
- Art & photography coordination: Tai Linzie
- Package production: Doug Joswick
- Legal counsel: Donald M. Woodard, Esq.
- Business affairs: Randy McMillan, Antoinette Trotman, Ian Allen
- Sample clearances: Eric Weissman Music Licensing Inc.

== Charts ==
=== Weekly charts ===
Chart (2010)	Peak position
Australian Albums Chart	33
Canadian Albums Chart	20
Norwegian Albums Chart	16
Swiss Albums Chart	99
UK Albums Chart	80
UK Hip Hop and R&B Albums Chart	14
US Billboard 200	3
US Billboard Top R&B/Hip-Hop Albums	3
US Billboard Top Rap Albums	3

=== Year-end charts ===
Chart (2010)	Position
US Billboard 200	183
US Billboard Top R&B/Hip-Hop Albums	41
US Billboard Top Rap Albums	17
