= Shutterbugg =

Single by Big Boi featuring Cutty

from the album Sir Lucious Left Foot: The Son of Chico Dusty
- Released: 20 June 2010 (UK)
- Genre: Hip hop; funktronica
- Length: 3:34
- Label: Def Jam
- Songwriter(s): Antwan Patton; Scott Storch; Ricardo Lewis; Christopher Carmouche
- Producer(s): Scott Storch; Big Boi (co.)

Big Boi singles chronology
| "Ringtone" (2009) | "Shutterbugg" (2010) | "Follow Us" (2010) |

"Shutterbugg" is a song by American rapper Big Boi, released in 2010 as the first single from his debut solo album, Sir Lucious Left Foot: The Son of Chico Dusty. The song features singer Cutty on the song's chorus. It was co-produced by Scott Storch and Big Boi himself. "Shutterbugg" was nominated for a Grammy Award for Best Rap Performance by a Duo or Group in 2011. Rolling Stone named it the fourteenth best single of 2010 in its year-end list. PopMatters ranked it number seven on its year-end best songs list. It is also featured on the NBA 2K11 and NBA 2K25 soundtrack.

== Music video ==
The video for "Shutterbugg" premiered on 28 May 2010 via Big Boi's Vevo site. It was directed by Chris Robinson and premiered on 26 May 2010. The video's concept incorporates various scenes that accentuate different lines from Big Boi's lyrics. On its concept, Big Boi said in an interview for MTV, "It goes with the rhymes. Chris Robinson was definitely onboard [with the concept]. What he took from the song was a lyrical, visual adventure. There's a lot of special stuff going on. He's freaking the visuals like I'm freaking the rhymes". Scenes in the music video include Big Boi rapping on a mountain of sneakers, a wall of red disposable cups and four kegs forming a backdrop, a group of puppets serving as a backing band, and a "buxom beauty" holding the disembodied head of Big Boi in the crook of her arm. Simon Vozick-Levinson of Entertainment Weekly wrote that the video "boasts appropriately nutty imagery to go with the song’s wild sound".

== Reception ==
"Shutterbugg" peaked at number 60 on the U.S. R&B Charts but failed to chart on the Billboard Hot 100. However, in the UK, the song became a top 40 hit, peaking at number 31 on the UK Singles Chart. "Shutterbugg" became a top 20 hit on the UK R&B Singles Chart, peaking at number 13. "Shutterbugg" was listed as the fifth best song of 2010 by Pitchfork Media. "Shutterbugg" charted at No. 77 on Triple J's Hottest 100 of 2010, Australia's annual online music poll.

This song was also featured in the opening episode of the seventh season of Entourage.

== Formats and track listings ==
Digital download

1. "Shutterbugg" (featuring Cutty) (Explicit) - 3:34

== Chart positions ==
| Chart (2010) | Peak position |
|---|---|
| UK Singles Chart | 31 |
| UK R&B Singles | 13 |
| U.S. Billboard Bubbling Under Hot 100 Singles | 20 |
| U.S. Billboard Hot R&B/Hip-Hop Songs | 60 |
| German Black Charts | 8 |
