= Skeletons (Travis Scott song) =

Song by Travis Scott featuring Tame Impala, the Weeknd and Pharrell Williams

from the album Astroworld
- Released: August 3, 2018
- Recorded: October 16, 2017–August 2018
- Genre: Psychedelic rock
- Length: 2:25
- Label: Cactus Jack; Grand Hustle; Epic
- Songwriters: Jacques Webster II; Pharrell Williams; Kevin Parker; Abel Tesfaye; Kanye West; Reine Fiske; Michael Dean
- Producers: Tame Impala; Scott

"Skeletons" (stylized in all caps) is a song by American rapper Travis Scott. It features guest vocals from fellow American musician Pharrell Williams, Australian psychedelic music project Tame Impala (led by Kevin Parker), and Canadian singer the Weeknd. The song was released through Cactus Jack, Grand Hustle and Epic Records, as the seventh track from the former's third studio album Astroworld, on August 3, 2018.

Produced by Tame Impala and additionally produced by Scott himself, the latter and Parker of the project wrote the song alongside Williams, the Weeknd, Kanye West, Reine Fiske, and Mike Dean. "Skeletons" is one of the two songs on Astroworld that the Weeknd provides vocals on, with the other song being "Wake Up", which was the track after it on the album and was sent to rhythmic contemporary radio in 2019 as its fourth and final single.

Upon its release, the song charted at number 47 on the Billboard Hot 100 and number 27 on the Hot R&B/Hip-Hop Songs charts, both in the United States. The song also charted in Canada, France, and Sweden, the latter also holding the song's ultimate chart peak at number 12 on the Sverigetopplistan's Sweden Heatseeker chart. It was additionally certified 2× Platinum in the United States, Platinum in Canada, Gold in Poland, and Silver in the United Kingdom.

== Composition ==
"Skeletons" has been described as a "kaleidoscope-pop" song that draws lyrical influences from Kanye West by Larry Fitzmaurice of Pitchfork. Grant Rindner of The Line of Best Fit described the production of the song as "typically kaleidoscopic, but features the menacing, gothic bass that you hear on Travis Scott standouts like '3500' or 'Antidote'". Aaron Williams of Uproxx summarized: "The first time either of these two particular connections worked out in Travis' favor, 'Skeletons' is the proof that a little goes a long way, as he ladles Pharrell and Abel [the Weeknd]'s contributions over his own recipe, rather than steeping himself in their respective sounds".

On June 27, 2022, a demo version of the track leaked online after it was purchased for $8,000. This version, dated March 11, 2018, sees Kanye West as the primary artist. The song was supposedly Scott's at first, before he briefly gave it to West during the sessions for his album Ye (2018), then known as Love Everyone, which West then gave back to Scott. Differences include additional background vocals from Scott, The Weeknd, and Williams, a sample of an interview of Elon Musk, a different mix, and West performing two separate verses. The first verse is over 2 minutes long, where West raps lyrics that were eventually reused for his song "Cudi Montage" from his collaborative album with Kid Cudi, Kids See Ghosts (2018), while the second verse has West using lyrics that Scott later rewrote and rapped on the final song.

== Commercial performance ==
In the United States, the song charted at number 47 on the Billboard Hot 100 and peaked at number 27 on the Hot R&B/Hip-Hop Songs chart. It was also certified 2× Platinum by the Recording Industry Association of America (RIAA) for equivalent sales of 2,000,000 units in the States. In Canada, the song charted at number 42 on the Canadian Hot 100 and was certified Platinum by Music Canada (MC) for equivalent sales of 80,000 units in the country. In France, the song charted at number 110 on the SNEP charts. In Poland, although the song did not chart, it was certified Gold by the Polish Society of the Phonographic Industry (ZPAV) for equivalent sales of 25,000 units in the country. In Sweden, the song charted at number 12 on the Sverigetopplistan's Sweden Heatseeker chart, its highest peak on any chart it made. In the United Kingdom, although the song did not chart, it was certified Silver by the British Phonographic Industry (BPI) for equivalent sales of 200,000 units in the country.

== Charts ==
Chart (2018)	Peak position
Canada Hot 100 (Billboard)	42
France (SNEP)	110
Sweden Heatseeker (Sverigetopplistan)	12
US Billboard Hot 100	47
US Hot R&B/Hip-Hop Songs (Billboard)	27

== Certifications ==
Region	Certification	Certified units/sales
Brazil (Pro-Música Brasil)	Platinum	40,000^{‡}
Canada (Music Canada)	Platinum	80,000^{‡}
Denmark (IFPI Danmark)	Gold	45,000^{‡}
France (SNEP)	Gold	100,000^{‡}
New Zealand (RMNZ)	Platinum	30,000^{‡}
Poland (ZPAV)	Gold	25,000^{‡}
United Kingdom (BPI)	Silver	200,000^{‡}
United States (RIAA)	2× Platinum	2,000,000^{‡}
^{‡} Sales+streaming figures based on certification alone.
