= Astrothunder =

Song by Travis Scott

from the album Astroworld
- Released: August 23, 2018
- Genre: Neo-psychedelia
- Length: 2:23
- Label: Cactus Jack; Grand Hustle; Epic
- Songwriters: Jacques Webster II; Adam Feeney; John Mayer; Stephen Bruner; Matthew Tavares; Tommy Paxton-Beesley; Joseph Thornalley
- Producers: Travis Scott; Frank Dukes; Thundercat; Mayer

"Astrothunder" is a song by American rapper and singer Travis Scott. It was released through Cactus Jack, Grand Hustle and Epic Records as the eleventh track from his third studio album, Astroworld, on August 2, 2018. Produced by Scott himself, Frank Dukes, John Mayer, Thundercat, and additionally produced by Matty, River Tiber, and Vegyn, the seven of them wrote the song together.

== Composition ==
Larry Fitzmaurice of Pitchfork felt that "Astrothunder" sees producer Thundercat "dialing back his frenetic jazz-funk to a percolating crawl". Aaron Williams of Uproxx summarized: "Almost lullaby-like toward the end, this one is more of a bridge point between the rowdy front half of Astroworld and its more mellow back end". Andy Kellman of AllMusic described it one of his "most moving and personal cuts".

== Charts ==
Chart (2018)	Peak position
Canada Hot 100 (Billboard)	43
France (SNEP)	134
Sweden Heatseeker (Sverigetopplistan)	19
US Billboard Hot 100	48
US Hot R&B/Hip-Hop Songs (Billboard)	28

== Certifications ==
Region	Certification	Certified units/sales
Australia (ARIA)	Gold	35,000^{‡}
Brazil (Pro-Música Brasil)	Platinum	40,000^{‡}
Canada (Music Canada)	Platinum	80,000^{‡}
France (SNEP)	Gold	100,000^{‡}
Italy (FIMI)	Gold	50,000^{‡}
New Zealand (RMNZ)	Platinum	30,000^{‡}
Poland (ZPAV)	Gold	25,000^{‡}
United Kingdom (BPI)	Silver	200,000^{‡}
United States (RIAA)	2× Platinum	2,000,000^{‡}
^{‡} Sales+streaming figures based on certification alone.
