= Butterfly Effect (Travis Scott song) =

2017 single by Travis Scott

Single by Travis Scott

from the album Astroworld
- Released: May 15, 2017
- Recorded: 2017
- Genre: Hip-hop
- Length: 3:11
- Label: Epic
- Songwriters: Jacques Webster II; Shane Lindstrom; Donald Paton
- Producers: Murda Beatz; Felix Leone (co.)

Travis Scott singles chronology
"Love Galore" (2017)	"Butterfly Effect" (2017)	"Portland" (2017)

Music video
- "Butterfly Effect" on YouTube

"Butterfly Effect" (stylized in all caps) is a song by American rapper Travis Scott. It was released on May 15, 2017, as the lead single from his third studio album Astroworld (2018) by Epic Records. The song was written alongside producers Murda Beatz and Felix Leone.

== Background ==
During a performance in Portsmouth, Virginia on May 4, 2017, Scott hinted at the release of new music in a freestyle. Scott can be heard saying: "Dropping new music in a few days. Bout to go crazy for a few days." The song was released alongside two other songs from Scott on SoundCloud, including "A Man" and "Green & Purple", which featured American rapper Playboi Carti.

== Reception ==
Lawrence Burney of Vice magazine said: "'Butterfly Effect' is textbook slurred Scott number, with backing vocals that sounds eerily similar to Migos' 'Slippery.'" Madeline Roth of MTV said the song is "hazy" and "low-key". Similarly, Tom Breihan of Stereogum said: "'Butterfly Effect' is low-key and melodic, with some sharp production from Drake collaborator Murda Beatz."

"Butterfly Effect" debuted at number 99 on the US Billboard Hot 100 on the week of June 17, 2017, and peaked at number 50 following the release of Astroworld. The single was certified nine-times platinum by the Recording Industry Association of America (RIAA) for combined sales and streaming equivalent units of 9,000,000 units in the United States.

== Music video ==
The music video was released on July 13, 2017, via Travis Scott's Vevo channel. It was directed by BRTHR, who also directed the video to Scott's "Goosebumps".

== Live performances ==
On May 17, 2017, Scott performed "Butterfly Effect" for the first time at a show in St. Louis. On August 27, 2017, he performed the chorus of the song with Thirty Seconds to Mars on their song "Walk On Water" at the MTV Video Music Awards. Scott also performed the song at the MTV Europe Music Awards on November 12, 2017.

== Personnel ==
Credits adapted from Tidal.

- Murda Beatz – production
- Felix Leone – co-production
- Thomas Cullison – engineering assistance
- Mike Dean – master engineering
- Blake "Blizzy" Harden – mix engineering, record engineering

== Charts ==
=== Weekly charts ===
Chart (2017–20)	Peak position
Australia (ARIA)	46
Belgium (Ultratip Bubbling Under Flanders)	28
Canada Hot 100 (Billboard)	40
Czech Republic Singles Digital (ČNS IFPI)	62
Denmark (Tracklisten)	35
France (SNEP)	117
Ireland (IRMA)	90
Italy (FIMI)	50
Latvia (DigiTop100)	81
Netherlands (Single Top 100)	87
Portugal (AFP)	32
Slovakia Singles Digital (ČNS IFPI)	53
Sweden (Sverigetopplistan)	98
Switzerland (Schweizer Hitparade)	58
UK Singles (Official Charts)	57
US Billboard Hot 100	50
US Hot R&B/Hip-Hop Songs (Billboard)	17
US Rhythmic Airplay (Billboard)	12

=== Year-end charts ===
Chart (2017)	Position
Canada (Canadian Hot 100)	93
US Hot R&B/Hip-Hop Songs (Billboard)	46
US Streaming Songs (Billboard)	68
Chart (2018)	Position
Portugal (AFP)	171
Chart (2019)	Position
Portugal (AFP)	184

== Certifications ==
Region	Certification	Certified units/sales
Australia (ARIA)	3× Platinum	210,000^{‡}
Brazil (Pro-Música Brasil)	Diamond	250,000^{‡}
Canada (Music Canada)	8× Platinum	640,000^{‡}
Denmark (IFPI Danmark)	2× Platinum	180,000^{‡}
France (SNEP)	Diamond	333,333^{‡}
Germany (BVMI)	Platinum	400,000^{‡}
Italy (FIMI)	Platinum	50,000^{‡}
Mexico (AMPROFON)	3× Platinum+Gold	210,000^{‡}
New Zealand (RMNZ)	4× Platinum	120,000^{‡}
Poland (ZPAV)	2× Platinum	40,000^{‡}
Portugal (AFP)	4× Platinum	40,000^{‡}
Spain (Promusicae)	Platinum	60,000^{‡}
Sweden (GLF)	Gold	20,000^{‡}
Switzerland (IFPI Switzerland)	Platinum	20,000^{‡}
United Kingdom (BPI)	2× Platinum	1,200,000^{‡}
United States (RIAA)	9× Platinum	9,000,000^{‡}
Streaming
Greece (IFPI Greece)	2× Platinum	4,000,000^{†}
^{‡} Sales+streaming figures based on certification alone.^{†} Streaming-only figures based on certification alone.
