= Stop Trying to Be God =

2018 song by Travis Scott

Song by Travis Scott featuring Kid Cudi, Philip Bailey, James Blake, and Stevie Wonder

from the album Astroworld
- Released: August 3, 2018
- Recorded: 2016–2017
- Genre: Alternative trap
- Length: 5:38
- Label: Grand Hustle; Epic; Cactus Jack
- Songwriters: Jacques Webster II; James Litherland; Mike Dean; Kevin Gomringer; Tim Gomringer; Joshua Adams
- Producers: Scott; J Beatzz; Dean; Cubeatz (co.)

Music video
- "Stop Trying to Be God" on YouTube

"Stop Trying to Be God" (stylized in all caps) is a song by American rapper Travis Scott from his third studio album, Astroworld (2018). The song features additional vocals from Kid Cudi, James Blake, Philip Bailey of the band Earth, Wind & Fire, and Stevie Wonder, who plays harmonica on the track as well. The song was written by Blake, Scott, J Beatzz, Mike Dean, and CuBeatz, being produced by the latter four..

== Background ==
In an interview with Rolling Stone discussing Astroworld, Travis Scott's A&R Sickamore said, "The record we worked on the longest is "Stop Trying to Be God". I think that was the oldest record on the album."

In an interview with The Fader, Mike Dean spoke about working on the song:

It was crazy. It took like a year for it to all come together. Travis had to first part done and it just developed. I got a call one day that Stevie was coming to the studio and I was like "I'll be right there" [laughs]. I recorded his harmonica. Like, I never record people very much anymore. I just get somebody else to do that. With Stevie, I'm not gonna switch to someone else.

== Composition ==
"Stop Trying to Be God"
The ethereal composition weaves together heavenly hums and wistful harmonica lines. Scott's lyrics focuses on rebuking those whose egos make them feel and act god-like.

"Stop Trying to Be God" is an "indie trap" song. It features deep-voiced humming from Kid Cudi, as well as "subtle organ" and a harmonica solo from Stevie Wonder. After the instrumental switches in the bridge, James Blake sings with "equally inspiring and haunting" vocals. Lyrically, the song is a warning against developing a God complex from one's ego.

== Music video ==
The music video was directed by Dave Meyers, and has Biblical references. It opens with a herd of sheep walking down the street. Travis Scott is the shepherd, and is "resurrected in hellfire". Kylie Jenner appears in the video as a gold-glowing Virgin Mary, who cradles Scott after he is scorched. Scott also appears as a figure resembling God as seen in Monty Python and the Holy Grail. In the next sequence, Scott delivers a sermon before baptizing a line of people in a lake at a water park. Scott eventually flies around on a dragon, commanding it to breathe fire upon a town and bringing about the Apocalypse. He is confronted by God, who shoots lasers from his eyes and punishes Scott. James Blake later appears singing in a graveyard. The video ends with a recreation of Jesus in a manger, with Kylie Jenner reappearing and holding a lamb that sings.

== Live performances ==
Travis Scott performed the song with James Blake at the 2018 MTV Video Music Awards. They also performed the song with Philip Bailey at the 61st Annual Grammy Awards.

== Charts ==
Chart (2018)	Peak position
Australia (ARIA)	87
Canada Hot 100 (Billboard)	19
France (SNEP)	76
Germany (GfK)	100
Italy (FIMI)	97
Netherlands (Single Top 100)	94
Portugal (AFP)	39
Sweden Heatseeker (Sverigetopplistan)	1
UK Singles (Official Charts)	70
US Billboard Hot 100	27
US Hot R&B/Hip-Hop Songs (Billboard)	18

== Certifications ==
Region	Certification	Certified units/sales
Australia (ARIA)	Gold	35,000^{‡}
Brazil (Pro-Música Brasil)	Platinum	40,000^{‡}
Canada (Music Canada)	Platinum	80,000^{‡}
New Zealand (RMNZ)	Gold	15,000^{‡}
United Kingdom (BPI)	Silver	200,000^{‡}
United States (RIAA)	Platinum	1,000,000^{‡}
^{‡} Sales+streaming figures based on certification alone.
