= R.I.P. Screw =

2018 song by Travis Scott featuring Swae Lee

Song by Travis Scott featuring Swae Lee

from the album Astroworld
- Released: August 3, 2018
- Recorded: 2018
- Genre: Alternative hip hop
- Length: 3:05
- Label: Cactus Jack; Grand Hustle; Epic
- Songwriters: Jacques Webster II; Khalif Brown; Trocon Roberts, Jr.; Michael Dean; Blair Lavigne
- Producers: Travis Scott; FKi 1st

"R.I.P. Screw" is a song by American rapper and singer Travis Scott featuring fellow American rapper and singer Swae Lee. It was released through Cactus Jack, Grand Hustle, and Epic Records on August 3, 2018 as the fourth track from the former's third studio album Astroworld. The song was written by the artists alongside Blair Lavigne, FKi 1st, and Mike Dean, the latter two producing it with Scott. The song serves as a tribute to American disc jockey DJ Screw, who was from Scott's hometown of Houston, Texas and died from a codeine overdose in 2000.

== Composition ==
"R.I.P. Screw" serves as an honor to the late DJ Screw that also sees Scott pay tribute to the city of Houston, where he was born and raised, and talk about drug usage. He name-drops DJ Screw, as well as fellow Houston rapper Pimp C and the Houston-based Screwed Up Click collective that DJ Screw was a part of. The song includes "an aggressively angelic mix of Swae Lee's coos and candy-sweet keys". It contains a "dreamlike, codeine-paced beat" and Scott also references pouring four ounces of promethazine, a drug that DJ Screw was known for using.

== Critical reception ==
The song received generally positive reviews from music critics. Larry Fitzmaurice of Pitchfork simply described it as "lovely". Writing for XXL, Scott Glaysher felt that "Swae Lee provides soothing vocals on the somber homage cut". Andrew Barker of Variety described the song as "meditative" and felt that it "is an appropriately molasses-paced tribute to Houston's chopped-and-screwed innovator DJ Screw". Aaron Williams of Uproxx summarized: "Equal parts haunting and body-rocking, 'R.I.P. Screw' redeems some of the complaints about Swae Lee's Swaecation while establishing that Travis' chemistry with the Rae Sremmurd crooner is perhaps the best of any of his repeat collaborators".

== Charts ==
Chart (2018)	Peak position
Canada Hot 100 (Billboard)	28
France (SNEP)	87
Sweden Heatseeker (Sverigetopplistan)	3
US Billboard Hot 100	26
US Hot R&B/Hip-Hop Songs (Billboard)	17

== Certifications ==
Region	Certification	Certified units/sales
Australia (ARIA)	Gold	35,000^{‡}
Canada (Music Canada)	Platinum	80,000^{‡}
New Zealand (RMNZ)	Gold	15,000^{‡}
United States (RIAA)	Platinum	1,000,000^{‡}
^{‡} Sales+streaming figures based on certification alone.
