= Yosemite (Travis Scott song) =

2018 single by Travis Scott featuring Gunna and Nav

Single by Travis Scott featuring Gunna and Nav

from the album Astroworld
- Released: November 20, 2018
- Recorded: 2018
- Genre: Trap
- Length: 2:30
- Label: Grand Hustle; Epic; Cactus Jack
- Songwriters: Jacques Webster II; Sergio Kitchens; Navraj Goraya; June James; Chandler Dunham; Ramiro Morales
- Producers: James; Turbo; Ramy

Travis Scott singles chronology
"Zeze" (2018)	"Yosemite" (2018)	"Mile High" (2019)

Gunna singles chronology
"My Slime" (2018)	"Yosemite" (2018)	"Vicious (Oakland Remix)" (2018)

Nav singles chronology
"Know Me" (2018)	"Yosemite" (2018)	"Shoebox" (2019)

Music video
- "Yosemite" on YouTube

"Yosemite" is a song by American rapper Travis Scott. The song features appearances from fellow American rapper Gunna and Canadian rapper Nav. It originally was released on August 3, 2018, as a track from Scott's third studio album Astroworld, before being sent to rhythmic contemporary radio as the third single on November 20, 2018. The artists wrote the song alongside producers June James, Turbo, and Ramy.

== Background and composition ==
The song's title refers to Yosemite National Park, a place that is located in the Sierra Nevada mountain range in the eastern area of California. Gunna delivers a "smooth" guitar-driven melody of the chorus that sets the tone of "Yosemite". Travis Scott in a way matches his cadence on the verse, echoing that of which Gunna used on his single "Sold Out Dates", featuring American rapper Lil Baby, which he released earlier in 2018. The two artists both calmly rap and sing about their hedonistic lifestyles with many pieces of jewelry. When "Yosemite" was originally released, Nav had an unusually quiet voice in the song, which went viral, resulting in memes regarding him to the extent in which the rapper poked light fun at himself. However, one week later, this was fixed. The song's production incorporates airy flutes and Western twangs.

== Critical reception ==
"Yosemite" received positive reviews from critics, with a majority of the praise going towards Gunna's appearance (the song's chorus) and the song's guitar sample that is evident in most of his songs. Despite mostly positive reviews, the original mix to Nav's vocals (the song's outro) was heavily criticized and memed for being too quiet and poorly mixed, to which Nav himself poked fun at. The vocals were eventually fixed soon after.

== Chart performance ==
"Yosemite" debuted and peaked at number 25 on the US Billboard Hot 100 chart, on the issue dated August 18, 2018. This became the fourth highest-charting song from the album. It managed to chart for 18 weeks in total on the Hot 100. The song marks Gunna's first entry on the chart, although featured artists are not credited on the album, since Scott does not regularly credit them on albums. On July 26, 2019, the song was certified double platinum by the Recording Industry Association of America (RIAA) for combined sales and streaming equivalent units of over two million units in the United States.

== Music video ==
The official music video for the song, directed by Nabil Elderkin, was released on November 30, 2018. In the video, a young Scott is seen looking for Astroworld through a dense jungle. The kid's journey to find the theme park is a symbolic representation of the artist's rise to fame and the commercial success that came with creating, or "finding", his third studio album, Astroworld. Gunna also appears in the video with the adult Scott on a plane as they perform the song. However, Nav does not appear in the video.

== Charts ==
Chart (2018–2019)	Peak position
Australia (ARIA)	97
Canada Hot 100 (Billboard)	18
France (SNEP)	93
Germany (GfK)	98
Portugal (AFP)	56
Sweden (Sverigetopplistan)	92
UK Singles (OCC)	93
US Billboard Hot 100	25
US Hot R&B/Hip-Hop Songs (Billboard)	16
US Rhythmic Airplay (Billboard)	24

== Certifications ==
Certifications for "Yosemite"
Region	Certification	Certified units/sales
Australia (ARIA)	Platinum	70,000^{‡}
Brazil (Pro-Música Brasil)	Platinum	40,000^{‡}
Canada (Music Canada)	4× Platinum	320,000^{‡}
Denmark (IFPI Danmark)	Gold	45,000^{‡}
France (SNEP)	Gold	100,000^{‡}
Italy (FIMI)	Gold	35,000^{‡}
New Zealand (RMNZ)	Platinum	30,000^{‡}
Poland (ZPAV)	Gold	25,000^{‡}
United Kingdom (BPI)	Gold	400,000^{‡}
United States (RIAA)	4× Platinum	4,000,000^{‡}
^{‡} Sales+streaming figures based on certification alone.

== Release history ==
Region	Date	Format	Label	Ref.
United States	November 20, 2018	Urban contemporary	Grand Hustle; Epic; Cactus Jack	
