= Astroworld (album) =

2018 studio album by Travis Scott

- Digital and physical "Day" version cover

Studio album by Travis Scott
- Released: August 3, 2018
- Recorded: 2016 – July 2018
- Studios: Cactus (Honolulu); Chalice; Westlake (Los Angeles); Conway; Henson (Hollywood); Dean's List House of Hits (Cypress); Studio 713 (Houston)
- Genres: Hip-hop; psychedelic rap
- Length: 58:33
- Labels: Cactus Jack; Grand Hustle; Epic
- Producers: 30 Roc; B Wheezy; Bkorn; Cardo; Cubeatz; FKi 1st; Frank Dukes; Hit-Boy; J Beatzz; John Mayer; June James; Mike Dean; Murda Beatz; Nineteen85; Oz; Rogét Chahayed; Sevn Thomas; Sonny Digital; Tame Impala; Tay Keith; Thundercat; TM88; Travis Scott; Wallis Lane; WondaGurl

Travis Scott chronology
Huncho Jack, Jack Huncho (2017)	Astroworld (2018)	JackBoys (2019)

Alternative cover
- "Night" version cover

Singles from Astroworld
- 1. "Butterfly Effect" Released: May 15, 2017; 2. "Sicko Mode" Released: August 21, 2018; 3. "Yosemite" Released: November 20, 2018; 4. "Wake Up" Released: March 26, 2019

Astroworld (stylized in all caps) is the third studio album by American rapper Travis Scott. It was released on August 3, 2018, through Cactus Jack Records and Grand Hustle Records, and distributed by Epic Records. The album features guest vocals from Frank Ocean, Drake, Swae Lee, Kid Cudi, James Blake, Philip Bailey, Juice Wrld, Sheck Wes, the Weeknd, 21 Savage, Gunna, Nav, Don Toliver, Quavo, and Takeoff, among others. Production was handled by multiple producers, including Scott himself, Mike Dean, Allen Ritter, Hit-Boy, WondaGurl, Tay Keith, Tame Impala, Frank Dukes, Sonny Digital, Murda Beatz, and Thundercat, among others. The album follows Scott's second studio album, Birds in the Trap Sing McKnight (2016), and his collaborative album with Quavo, Huncho Jack, Jack Huncho (2017).

Astroworld is named after the defunct theme park Six Flags AstroWorld, which was located in Houston, Texas prior to its closure. Scott, a Houston native, aimed for the album to sound like "taking an amusement park away from kids". He also described the album as a continuation of his debut album Rodeo (2015). Astroworld is a hip-hop and psychedelic rap album, incorporating elements of trap and psychedelic music. The album was supported by four singles, "Butterfly Effect", "Sicko Mode", "Yosemite", and "Wake Up".

Astroworld received critical acclaim and was a huge commercial success, debuting atop the US Billboard 200 with 537,000 album-equivalent units, of which 270,000 were pure sales. It was certified six-times platinum by the Recording Industry Association of America (RIAA). The album was nominated for Best Rap Album at the 61st Annual Grammy Awards. It won Album of the Year at the 2019 BET Hip Hop Awards. Astroworld was named one of the best albums of 2018 and the decade by several publications.

== Background ==
The title of the album was announced in May 2016, and initially teased for a 2017 release. The album title is named after the defunct theme park Six Flags AstroWorld, which was located in Houston, Texas prior to its closure in 2005. In a 2017 interview with GQ, Scott spoke on the title of the album: "They tore down AstroWorld to build more apartment space. That's what it's going to sound like, like taking an amusement park away from kids. We want it back. We want the building back. That's why I'm doing it. It took the fun out of the city." Scott described the album as a continuation of his debut album, Rodeo (2015), stating: "My whole idea was, if you locked into Rodeo, you definitely locked into Astroworld. I'm just finishing the saga I started on my first album. This is supposed to be my second album. I had to go quick, because like I said, I had all these ideas, I just had to get off real quick, but now I'm finally back home with Astroworld."

== Recording ==
Recording for the album took place between 2016 and 2018, with Travis Scott posting updates through social media. In July 2018, it was reported that Scott was completing the album in Hawaii with a variety of recording artists and producers, such as Mike Dean, Nav, Frank Dukes, Sonny Digital, WondaGurl, Sheck Wes, Gunna, Wheezy, Don Toliver, Allen Ritter and Amir "Cash" Esmailian.

== Composition ==
Astroworld is a hip-hop and psychedelic rap album, incorporating elements of trap and psychedelic music. "Stargazing" has been described as a "psychedelic trap" song, while "Coffee Bean" is said to inhabit "old school hip hop territory with a blissed-out funk guitar". The song "Skeletons" has been labelled as "kaleidoscope-pop" by Pitchfork that draws lyrical influences from Kanye West.

== Artwork ==
The cover was shot by American photographer David LaChapelle, and features a giant golden inflatable of Scott's head as the entrance to an amusement park, with children, parents, and park employees in front of it. A second cover features the same amusement park entrance at nighttime, replacing the family-friendly features with adult-themed content. On August 1, 2018, transgender model Amanda Lepore, who is a known collaborator with LaChapelle, questioned why she had been excluded on the final version of the second cover. LaChapelle later responded, stating that it was due to Lepore upstaging the other models on the cover. Travis Scott would also respond via Twitter, explaining he had "nothing but respect for the LGBTQ community".

In September 2018, TMZ reported that featured artist Frank Ocean filed a cease and desist against Scott to have his verse on "Carousel" removed due to disagreements over the song's sound. Ocean soon issued a clarification, stating: "I think the song sounds cool [...] I also approved it before it came out so the cease and desist wasn't about 🔊 it was about 🏳️‍🌈. Me and Travis resolved it amongst ourselves weeks ago. 💖" Ocean's use of the pride flag was seen to be a reference to the controversial removal of Lepore from the cover.

== Release and promotion ==
In May 2017, Scott uploaded three songs to SoundCloud—"A Man", "Green and Purple" featuring Playboi Carti, and "Butterfly Effect". The latter song was also released on music streaming services as a single. The single "Watch" featuring Lil Uzi Vert and Kanye West, was released on May 4, 2018. The song peaked at number 16 on the US Billboard Hot 100.

On July 27, 2018, a giant sculpture of Scott's head appeared on top of an Amoeba Music store in Los Angeles. Multiple copies of the sculpture appeared in various other locations, including Scott's hometown of Houston, Texas. After significant internet speculation, the release date for Astroworld was announced on July 30, 2018, through social media, alongside an album trailer, which featured the track "Stargazing".

The release was followed by an episode of Wav Radio on Beats 1 with Chase B. Three songs were premiered that did not make the final track listing: "Houdini" featuring Playboi Carti, "Zoom" featuring Gunna, and "Part Time". A music video for the song "Stop Trying to Be God" was released on August 6, 2018, directed by Dave Meyers. Scott performed a medley of three songs at the 2018 MTV Video Music Awards.

== Singles ==
"Butterfly Effect" was released on May 15, 2017, for streaming and digital download as the album's lead single. It peaked at number 50 on the Billboard Hot 100.

"Sicko Mode" was sent to rhythmic and urban contemporary radio on August 21, 2018, as the album's second single. The song features guest vocals from Canadian rapper Drake and additional vocals from American rappers Swae Lee and Big Hawk. It peaked at number one on the Billboard Hot 100.

"Yosemite" was sent to urban contemporary radio on November 20, 2018, as the album's third single. The song features guest vocals from fellow American rapper Gunna and Canadian rapper Nav. It peaked at number 25 on the Billboard Hot 100.

The album's fourth single, "Wake Up", was sent to rhythmic contemporary radio on March 26, 2019. The song features guest vocals from Canadian singer-songwriter the Weeknd. It peaked at number 30 on the Billboard Hot 100.

== Critical reception ==
Professional ratings
Aggregate scores
Source	Rating
AnyDecentMusic?	8.1/10
Metacritic	85/100
Review scores
Source	Rating
AllMusic	4.5/5 stars
Consequence	B
Entertainment Weekly	B
Exclaim!	9/10
The Independent	5/5 stars
NME	5/5 stars
Pitchfork	7.8/10
Rolling Stone	3.5/5 stars
The Times	4/5 stars
XXL	4/5

Astroworld was met with widespread critical acclaim. At Metacritic, which assigns a normalized rating out of 100 to reviews from professional publications, the album received an average score of 85, based on 19 reviews. Aggregator AnyDecentMusic? gave it 8.1 out of 10, based on their assessment of the critical consensus.

Jordan Bassett of NME gave Astroworld a perfect rating, praising the album's guest appearances and noting "Stop Trying to Be God" as "a record of extraordinary prowess", while describing "Coffee Bean" as "a moment that encapsulates the scope and ambition of Astroworld". Bassett concluded: "This is the sound of a musician who has worked to forge an entire world, an empire, around himself – we can peer in, but from afar, guessing at his motives and life behind the velvet rope." With similar acclaim, Kassandra Guagliardi of Exclaim! concluded that Astroworld "shows the evolution of Travis Scott as an artist and is his most refined, imaginative, and rage-worthy project yet". Roisin O'Connor of The Independent described Astroworld as "a futuristic record with virtually flawless production, that lingers on the mind long after the final track" and labelled it Scott's "most career-defining work to date". For Consequence, Wren Graves wrote that Astroworld is "an album full of infectious flows and atmospheric beats". Thomas Hobbs of Highsnobiety stated that Astroworld "will be remembered as the moment Travis Scott produced a piece of music worthy of the riots he is capable of inducing. It's a wildly entertaining circus ride. Travis Scott desperately needed a great album to justify the hype, and with Astroworld, he just might have a classic". Grant Rindner of The Line of Best Fit saying "Scott could have easily made another distorted, debaucherous project like his previous two albums, but by emphasizing his vocal performances and finding the best middle ground he ever has with his bevy of superstar collaborators, he's made Astroworld a theme park worth revisiting whether you came in as a stan or a skeptic".

Larry Fitzmaurice of Pitchfork labelled Astroworld as Scott's strongest album to date, stating that "his skill as a curator helps sculpt a sticky, humid, psychedelic world with dazzling production and odd pleasures at every turn", although considered Scott to "play ringmaster to his neon-decayed circus of sound rather than become the main attraction". Andrew Barker of Variety said, "At 17 tracks, Astroworld is not without filler—the 21 Savage feature "NC-17" is tiresomely sophomoric, while "Can't Say" and "Houstonfornication" never really take shape—but rarely does the album feel lazy or uninspired". For Rolling Stone, Christopher R. Weingarten complimented the first half of the album, though considered the second half to be weaker in comparison: "Unfortunately, Scott doesn't keep the envelope pushing up for the whole album: a seven-song stretch in the back end is vintage Travis with its zoned-out, hypnotic throb. However, the rest marks the most interesting music of his career, Scott no longer just looking the part of a brilliant artist, but sounding like it too."

=== Rankings ===
Select rankings of Astroworld
Publication	List	Rank	Ref.
Billboard	50 Best Albums of 2018	7	
Billboard	100 Best Albums of the 2010s	83	
Complex	50 Best Albums of 2018	2	
Entertainment Weekly	20 Best Albums of 2018	20	
The Guardian	The 50 Best Albums of 2018	28	
The Independent	The 40 Best Albums of 2018	13	
NME	Best Albums of the Year 2018	19	
NME	Best Albums of the Decade: The 2010s	64	
Pitchfork	The 50 Best Albums of 2018	23	
Rolling Stone	50 Best Albums of 2018	6	
Rolling Stone	The 200 Greatest Hip-Hop Albums of All Time	200	
Uproxx	The 50 Best Albums of 2018	1	
Uproxx	The Best Albums of the 2010s	20	
Vibe	30 Best Albums of 2018	28	

=== Industry awards ===
Awards and nominations for Astroworld
Year	Ceremony	Category	Result	Ref.
2019	American Music Awards	Favorite Album – Rap/Hip-Hop	Nominated	
2019	BET Hip Hop Awards	Album of the Year	Won	
2019	Billboard Music Awards	Top Billboard 200 Album	Nominated	
2019	Billboard Music Awards	Top Rap Album	Nominated	
2019	Grammy Awards	Best Rap Album	Nominated	
2019	Juno Awards	International Album of the Year	Nominated	

== Commercial performance ==
In Travis Scott's home country of the United States, Astroworld debuted at number one on the Billboard 200 with 537,000 album-equivalent units, which included 270,000 pure album sales. The album scored the second-largest first week of the year, behind Scorpion by Drake, and second-largest pure album sales week of the year, behind Dave Matthews Band's Come Tomorrow. The album earned 349.43 million streams in the first week, marking the fifth largest streaming week ever. It serves as Scott's second number-one album in the United States. Following the release, all 17 tracks on the album entered the US Billboard Hot 100, including "Sicko Mode" (at 4) and "Stargazing" (8), which made Scott the fourth act to have debuted multiple songs in the chart's top 10 simultaneously. The album earned 205,000 album-equivalent units in the second week, staying at number one. On December 3, 2018, Astroworld returned to the number-one spot on the Billboard 200, earning 71,000 album-equivalent units, almost four months after its initial release. By the end of 2018, the album has earned over 1,985,000 album-equivalent units in the US, with over 464,000 being pure sales, marking the second best-selling hip-hop in pure album sales of the year, behind only Eminem's Kamikaze. On August 29, 2024, Astroworld was certified six-times platinum by the Recording Industry Association of America (RIAA) with six million album-equivalent units in the United States.

In Australia, Astroworld opened atop the ARIA Albums Chart, becoming Travis Scott's first number-one on the chart. Two tracks "Sicko Mode" (at 7) and "Stargazing" (10) charted in the top ten of the ARIA Singles Chart, marking the rapper's first top ten songs in the country. In Canada, Astroworld moved 27,000 album-equivalent units in its opening week. It serves as Scott's first number-one album in the country. In the second week, the album earned 13,000 album-equivalent units, marking the second straight week at the top of the Billboard Canadian Albums. In the United Kingdom, the album debuted at number three on the UK Albums Chart, becoming the rapper's first top ten album on the chart. As well as the album, the three tracks "Sicko Mode" (at 9), "Stargazing" (15), and "Carousel" (29) charted in the top 40 of the UK Singles Chart, while the lead single "Butterfly Effect" previously reached number 57 on the chart.

== Track listing ==
Astroworld track listing
No.	Title	Writer(s)	Producer(s)	Length
1.	"Stargazing"	Jacques Webster II; Sonny Uwaezuoke; Samuel Gloade; Brandon Korn; Brandon Whitfield; Michael Dean; Cydel Young; Jamie Lepe; Lamont Porter	Sonny Digital; 30 Roc; Bkorn; B Wheezy; Travis Scott^{[b]}; Mike Dean^{[b]}; Allen Ritter^{[b]}	4:31
2.	"Carousel"	Webster; Christopher Breaux; Chauncey Hollis, Jr.; Rick Rubin; Adam Yauch; Adam Horovitz; Michael Diamond	Hit-Boy; Rogét Chahayed^{[a]}; Dean^{[b]}	3:00
3.	"Sicko Mode"	Webster; Aubrey Graham; Khalif Brown; John Hawkins; Hollis; Ozan Yildirim; Brytavious Chambers; Tim Gomringer; Kevin Gomringer; Chahayed; Dean; Young; Luther Campbell; Harry Wayne Casey; Richard Finch; Christopher Wallace; Osten Harvey; Bryan Higgins; Trevor Smith; James Jackson; Malik Taylor; Keith Elam; Chris E. Martin; Kamaal Fareed; Ali Jones-Muhammad; Tyrone Taylor; Fred Scruggs; Kirk Jones; Chylow Parker; Mirsad Dervić; O'Shea Jackson	Hit-Boy; Oz; Tay Keith; Cubeatz; Chahayed; Dean^{[b]}	5:12
4.	"R.I.P. Screw"	Webster; K. Brown; Trocon Roberts, Jr.; Dean; Blair Lavigne	Travis Scott; FKi 1st; Dean^{[b]}	3:05
5.	"Stop Trying to Be God"	Webster; James Litherland; Joshua Adams; Dean; K. Gomringer; T. Gomringer	Travis Scott; J Beatzz; Dean; Cubeatz^{[b]}	5:38
6.	"No Bystanders"	Webster; Jarad Higgins; Khadimou Fall; Dean; Ebony Oshunrinde; Bryan Simmons; Young; Filip Gežin; Björk Guðmundsdóttir; Sigurjón Sigurdsson; Paul Beauregard; Ricky Dunigan; Jordan Houston; Lola Mitchell; Darnell Carlton; Robert Phillips	Dean; WondaGurl; TM88; David Stromberg^{[b]}; Gežin^{[b]}	3:38
7.	"Skeletons"	Webster; Pharrell Williams; Kevin Parker; Abel Tesfaye; Kanye West; Reine Fiske; Dean	Tame Impala; Travis Scott^{[b]}	2:25
8.	"Wake Up"	Webster; Tesfaye; Dean; Kaan Güneşberk; Adam Feeney; Rupert Thomas, Jr.; Nima Jahanbin; Paimon Jahanbin	Frank Dukes; Sevn Thomas; Wallis Lane; John Mayer^{[a]}	3:52
9.	"5% Tint"	Webster; Roberts; Dean; Rico Wade; Patrick Brown; Raymon Murray; Cameron Gipp; Willie Knighton; Robert Barnett; Thomas Callaway	FKi 1st; Dean^{[b]}	3:16
10.	"NC-17"	Webster; Shéyaa Abraham-Joseph; Johnny Stefene; Matthew Samuels; T. Gomringer; K. Gomringer; Ritter; Dean	Boi-1da; Cubeatz; Ritter^{[b]}; Dean^{[b]}	2:37
11.	"Astrothunder"	Webster; Feeney; Mayer; Stephen Bruner; Matthew Tavares; Tommy Paxton-Beesley; Joseph Thornalley	Travis Scott; Frank Dukes; Thundercat; Mayer; Matty^{[b]}; River Tiber^{[b]}; Vegyn^{[b]}	2:23
12.	"Yosemite"	Webster; Sergio Kitchens; Navraj Goraya; June James; Chandler Durham; Ramiro Morales; Sheldon Ferguson	James; Turbo^{[a]}; Ramy^{[a]}	2:30
13.	"Can't Say"	Webster; Caleb Toliver; Oshunrinde; James Cyr	WondaGurl; London Cyr^{[a]}; Dean^{[b]}	3:18
14.	"Who? What!"	Webster; Quavious Marshall; Kirshnik Ball; Ronald LaTour; Gloade; Feeney; Porter; Brock Korsan	Cardo; 30 Roc	2:56
15.	"Butterfly Effect"	Webster; Shane Lindstrom; Donald Paton	Murda Beatz; Felix Leone^{[a]}	3:11
16.	"Houstonfornication"	Webster; Thomas; N. Jahanbin; P. Jahanbin	Sevn Thomas; Wallis Lane	3:38
17.	"Coffee Bean"	Webster; Paul Jefferies; Timothy Suby; Dean; Young	Nineteen85; Tim Suby^{[a]}; Dean^{[b]}	3:29
Total length:				58:33

Notes

- All songs, like the album itself, are stylized in uppercase. For example, "Stargazing" is written as "STARGAZING"
- ^{^[a]} signifies a co-producer
- ^{^[b]} signifies an additional producer
- "Carousel" features vocals from Frank Ocean and uncredited vocals from Big Tuck
- "Sicko Mode" features vocals from Drake, Swae Lee, and Big Hawk
- "R.I.P. Screw" features vocals from Swae Lee
- "Stop Trying to Be God" features vocals from Kid Cudi, Philip Bailey, James Blake, and Stevie Wonder and additional vocals from BJ the Chicago Kid
- "No Bystanders" features vocals from Juice Wrld and Sheck Wes
- "Skeletons" features vocals from Pharrell Williams, Tame Impala, and the Weeknd
- "Wake Up" features vocals from the Weeknd
- "NC-17" features vocals from 21 Savage
- "Yosemite" features vocals from Gunna and Nav
- "Can't Say" features vocals from Don Toliver
- "Who? What!" features vocals from Quavo and Takeoff from the hip-hop trio Migos

Sample credits

- "Carousel" contains a sample of "The New Style" as performed by the Beastie Boys, written by Rick Rubin, Adam Horovitz, Adam Yauch and Michael Diamond.
- "Sicko Mode" contains a sample of "I Wanna Rock" as performed by Luke, written by Luther Campbell, Harry Wayne Casey and Richard Finch; and "Gimme the Loot" as performed by The Notorious B.I.G., written by Christopher Wallace, Osten Harvey, Bryan Higgins, Trevor Smith, James Jackson, Malik Taylor, Keith Elam, Christopher Martin, Kamaal Fareed, Ali Shaheed Jones-Muhammad, Tyrone Taylor, Fred Scruggs, Kirk Jones and Chylow Parker.
- "No Bystanders" contains a sample of "Jóga" as performed by Björk, written by Björk Guðmundsdóttir and Sigurjón Sigurdsson; and portions of "Tear Da Club Up", written by Paul Beauregard, Ricky Dunigan, Jordan Houston, Lola Mitchell, Darnell Carlton and Robert Phillips.
- "5% Tint" contains a sample of "Cell Therapy" performed by Goodie Mob, written by Rico Wade, Patrick Brown, Ray Murray, Cameron Gipp, Willie Knighton, Robert Barnett and Thomas Callaway.

== Personnel ==
Credits adapted from the album's liner notes.

Musicians

- Mike Dean – keyboards (track 4), guitar (track 17), synthesizer (track 17)
- Stevie Wonder – harmonica (track 5)
- John Mayer – guitar (tracks 8, 11, 13)
- Sheldon Ferguson – guitar (track 12)
- Nineteen85 – bass (track 17)
- Isaiah Gage – cello (track 17)
- Tim Suby – guitar (track 17)
- Stephen "Johan" Feigenbaum – strings (track 17)

Technical

- Mike Dean – mastering (all tracks), mixing (tracks 1–13, 16, 17), recording (track 8)
- Jimmy Cash – assistant engineer (tracks 1–13, 16, 17), recording (tracks 1, 4, 9–14, 17), mixing (tracks 6, 14)
- Jon Sher – assistant engineer (tracks 1, 3, 16, 17)
- Ben Sedano – assistant engineer (tracks 1, 3, 14, 16, 17)
- Sean Solymor – assistant engineer (tracks 1–13, 16, 17)
- Travis Scott – recording (tracks 2–4, 7–11, 16), mixing (tracks 3–5, 7, 8, 11, 17)
- Zach Steele – recording (tracks 2, 5, 12, 13, 17), mixing (track 6)
- Skyler McLean – assistant engineer (tracks 6, 12, 13)
- Shin Kamiyama – recording (track 8)
- Blake Harden – mixing (track 15), recording (track 15)
- Thomas Cullison – assistant engineer (track 15)

== Charts ==
=== Weekly charts ===
Chart performance for Astroworld
Chart (2018–2024)	Peak position
Australian Albums (ARIA)	1
Austrian Albums (Ö3 Austria)	4
Belgian Albums (Ultratop Flanders)	1
Belgian Albums (Ultratop Wallonia)	2
Canadian Albums (Billboard)	1
Czech Albums (ČNS IFPI)	1
Danish Albums (Hitlisten)	1
Dutch Albums (Album Top 100)	2
Finnish Albums (Suomen virallinen lista)	2
French Albums (SNEP)	2
German Albums (Offizielle Top 100)	4
German Albums (Top 20 Hip Hop)	1
Hungarian Albums (MAHASZ)	26
Irish Albums (IRMA)	2
Italian Albums (FIMI)	1
New Zealand Albums (RMNZ)	1
Nigerian Albums (TurnTable)	59
Norwegian Albums (VG-lista)	1
Polish Albums (ZPAV)	17
Portuguese Albums (AFP)	18
Scottish Albums (Official Charts)	39
Slovak Albums (ČNS IFPI)	1
Spanish Albums (PROMUSICAE)	12
Swedish Albums (Sverigetopplistan)	1
Swiss Albums (Schweizer Hitparade)	2
UK Albums (Official Charts)	3
UK R&B Albums (Official Charts)	2
US Billboard 200	1
US Top R&B/Hip-Hop Albums (Billboard)	1

=== Year-end charts ===
2018 year-end chart performance for Astroworld
Chart (2018)	Position
Australian Albums (ARIA)	33
Belgian Albums (Ultratop Flanders)	61
Belgian Albums (Ultratop Wallonia)	181
Canadian Albums (Billboard)	13
Danish Albums (Hitlisten)	12
Dutch Albums (MegaCharts)	38
Icelandic Albums (Tónlistinn)	19
New Zealand Albums (RMNZ)	32
Swedish Albums (Sverigetopplistan)	47
UK Albums (OCC)	68
US Billboard 200	7
US Top R&B/Hip-Hop Albums (Billboard)	4

2019 year-end chart performance for Astroworld
Chart (2019)	Position
Australian Albums (ARIA)	26
Belgian Albums (Ultratop Flanders)	50
Belgian Albums (Ultratop Wallonia)	159
Canadian Albums (Billboard)	8
Danish Albums (Hitlisten)	17
Dutch Albums (Album Top 100)	26
French Albums (SNEP)	138
Icelandic Albums (Tónlistinn)	15
Italian Albums (FIMI)	73
New Zealand Albums (RMNZ)	22
Swedish Albums (Sverigetopplistan)	47
Swiss Albums (Schweizer Hitparade)	60
UK Albums (OCC)	69
US Billboard 200	8
US Top R&B/Hip-Hop Albums (Billboard)	4

2020 year-end chart performance for Astroworld
Chart (2020)	Position
Australian Albums (ARIA)	43
Austrian Albums (Ö3 Austria)	64
Belgian Albums (Ultratop Flanders)	34
Belgian Albums (Ultratop Wallonia)	82
Canadian Albums (Billboard)	28
Danish Albums (Hitlisten)	23
Dutch Albums (Album Top 100)	28
French Albums (SNEP)	148
Icelandic Albums (Tónlistinn)	14
Italian Albums (FIMI)	42
New Zealand Albums (RMNZ)	25
Swedish Albums (Sverigetopplistan)	61
Swiss Albums (Schweizer Hitparade)	46
UK Albums (OCC)	86
US Billboard 200	32
US Top R&B/Hip-Hop Albums (Billboard)	15

2021 year-end chart performance for Astroworld
Chart (2021)	Position
Australian Albums (ARIA)	65
Austrian Albums (Ö3 Austria)	46
Belgian Albums (Ultratop Flanders)	61
Belgian Albums (Ultratop Wallonia)	144
Canadian Albums (Billboard)	36
Danish Albums (Hitlisten)	43
Dutch Albums (Album Top 100)	59
Icelandic Albums (Tónlistinn)	26
Italian Albums (FIMI)	77
Norwegian Albums (VG-lista)	38
Swiss Albums (Schweizer Hitparade)	48
US Billboard 200	45
US Top R&B/Hip-Hop Albums (Billboard)	21

2022 year-end chart performance for Astroworld
Chart (2022)	Position
Australian Albums (ARIA)	90
Belgian Albums (Ultratop Flanders)	107
Belgian Albums (Ultratop Wallonia)	180
Danish Albums (Hitlisten)	89
Icelandic Albums (Tónlistinn)	48
Lithuanian Albums (AGATA)	94
Swiss Albums (Schweizer Hitparade)	95
US Billboard 200	73
US Top R&B/Hip-Hop Albums (Billboard)	35

2023 year-end chart performance for Astroworld
Chart (2023)	Position
Australian Albums (ARIA)	89
Austrian Albums (Ö3 Austria)	31
Belgian Albums (Ultratop Flanders)	104
Belgian Albums (Ultratop Wallonia)	129
Danish Albums (Hitlisten)	96
Dutch Albums (Album Top 100)	91
German Albums (Offizielle Top 100)	84
Hungarian Albums (MAHASZ)	81
Icelandic Albums (Tónlistinn)	40
Italian Albums (FIMI)	51
Polish Albums (ZPAV)	74
Swiss Albums (Schweizer Hitparade)	32
US Billboard 200	70
US Top R&B/Hip-Hop Albums (Billboard)	32

2024 year-end chart performance of Astroworld
Chart (2024)	Position
Australian Albums (ARIA)	47
Australian Hip Hop/R&B Albums (ARIA)	11
Austrian Albums (Ö3 Austria)	13
Belgian Albums (Ultratop Flanders)	60
Belgian Albums (Ultratop Wallonia)	114
Canadian Albums (Billboard)	48
Danish Albums (Hitlisten)	73
Dutch Albums (Album Top 100)	46
German Albums (Offizielle Top 100)	35
Hungarian Albums (MAHASZ)	38
Icelandic Albums (Tónlistinn)	40
Italian Albums (FIMI)	53
Polish Albums (ZPAV)	21
Swiss Albums (Schweizer Hitparade)	17
US Billboard 200	74
US Top R&B/Hip-Hop Albums (Billboard)	25

2025 year-end chart performance of Astroworld
Chart (2025)	Position
Australian Albums (ARIA)	81
Austrian Albums (Ö3 Austria)	40
Belgian Albums (Ultratop Flanders)	84
Belgian Albums (Ultratop Wallonia)	174
Dutch Albums (Album Top 100)	92
German Albums (Offizielle Top 100)	76
Hungarian Albums (MAHASZ)	52
Icelandic Albums (Tónlistinn)	82
Polish Albums (ZPAV)	82
Swiss Albums (Schweizer Hitparade)	26
US Billboard 200	105
US Top R&B/Hip-Hop Albums (Billboard)	36

=== Decade-end charts ===
Decade-end chart performance for Astroworld
Chart (2010–2019)	Position
US Billboard 200	28

== Certifications ==
Certifications for Astroworld
Region	Certification	Certified units/sales
Australia (ARIA)	2× Platinum	140,000^{‡}
Austria (IFPI Austria)	Platinum	15,000^{‡}
Brazil (Pro-Música Brasil)	Diamond	160,000^{‡}
Canada (Music Canada)	5× Platinum	400,000^{‡}
Denmark (IFPI Danmark)	5× Platinum	100,000^{‡}
France (SNEP)	2× Platinum	200,000^{‡}
Germany (BVMI)	Platinum	200,000^{‡}
Hungary (MAHASZ)	2× Platinum	8,000^{‡}
Italy (FIMI)	4× Platinum	200,000^{‡}
Mexico (AMPROFON)	2× Platinum+Gold	150,000^{‡}
New Zealand (RMNZ)	5× Platinum	75,000^{‡}
Poland (ZPAV)	4× Platinum	80,000^{‡}
Portugal (AFP)	Gold	3,500^{‡}
Singapore (RIAS)	Gold	5,000^{*}
Sweden (GLF)	Platinum	30,000^{‡}
Switzerland (IFPI Switzerland)	Platinum	20,000^{‡}
United Kingdom (BPI)	Platinum	300,000^{‡}
United States (RIAA)	6× Platinum	6,000,000^{‡}
^{*} Sales figures based on certification alone.^{‡} Sales+streaming figures based on certification alone.

== Release history ==
Release dates and formats for Astroworld
Region	Date	Label(s)	Format(s)	Ref.
Various	August 3, 2018	Cactus Jack; Grand Hustle; Epic	Digital download; streaming	
Various	October 12, 2018	Cactus Jack; Grand Hustle; Epic	CD	
Various	November 16, 2018	Cactus Jack; Grand Hustle; Epic	Vinyl	
Japan	October 31, 2018	Sony Music	CD	
