= PLZ Make It Ruins =

British independent record label

- The official logo for PLZ Make It Ruins
- Founded: 2014; 11 years ago
- Founder: Vegyn
- Genre: Electronic; IDM; R&B; pop
- Country of origin: United Kingdom
- Location: London
- Official website: Official website

PLZ Make It Ruins is a record label started by British electronic artist Vegyn. Formed in 2014, it has released all of his projects, as well as work by artists such as Buddy Ross, John Glacier, John Keek, ARTHUR, and Double Virgo.

== History ==
The label was formed in 2014 by Vegyn using money saved from "bar and retail work". Its first release was his extended play (EP) All Bad Things Have Ended – Your Lunch Included, released on 14 January 2014. Shortly after, it released its first collaborative tape, PLZ Vol. 1, featuring a collection of underground London producers.

In March 2017, Vegyn released the two-track EP Phone Phoneys through the label.

While the label started with a focus on electronic music, it has over time expanded in scope and has released music in genres such as bedroom pop, R&B, and folk.

In December 2020, PLZ Make It Ruins partnered with Arts Council England to release a charity compilation titled Locked Grooves. Created in support of Liberty and the ACLU, it featured artists including 100 gecs, Arca, Mura Masa, King Krule, Clairo, and Four Tet.

== See also ==
- List of independent UK record labels
- List of electronic music record labels
