= Travis Scott production discography =

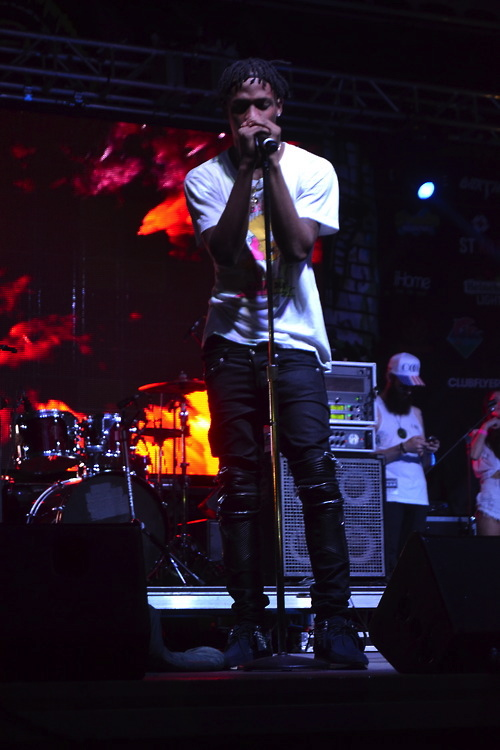
Travis Scott performing in 2013

The following list is a discography of production by Travis Scott, an American rapper from Houston, Texas. It includes a list of songs produced, co-produced and remixed by year, artist, album and title.

== Singles produced ==
List of singles produced, with selected chart positions and certifications, showing year released and album name
Title	Year	Peak chart positions										Certifications	Album
Title	Year	US	AUS	BEL (FL)	CAN	FRA	GER	IRL	NZ	SWI	UK	Certifications	Album
"Upper Echelon" (Scott featuring T.I. and 2 Chainz)	2013	—	—	—	—	—	—	—	—	—	—		Owl Pharaoh
"Don't Play" (Scott featuring The 1975 and Big Sean)	2014	—	—	—	—	—	—	—	—	—	—		Days Before Rodeo
"Mamacita" (Travis Scott featuring Rich Homie Quan and Young Thug)	2014	—	—	—	—	—	—	—	—	—	—		Days Before Rodeo
"Bitch Better Have My Money" (Rihanna)	2015	19	14	27	11	3	17	39	10	7	27	ARIA: Platinum; RIAA: 3× Platinum; RMNZ: Gold	non-album single
"After Party" (Don Toliver)	2020	57	34	—	35	3	17	24	38	—	47	RIAA: 3× Platinum	Heaven or Hell
"—" denotes a recording that did not chart or was not released in that territory.

== 2012 ==
=== Ro Ransom – Ransomnia ===
- 08. "Many Names, One Heart"

=== Various artists – Kanye West Presents GOOD Music: Cruel Summer ===
- 01. "To the World" (performed by Kanye West, R. Kelly, and Teyana Taylor) (produced with "Pop" Wansel, @Oakwud, Kanye West, Hudson Mohawke, Mano, The Twilight Tone, Ken Lewis, & Anthony Kilhoffer)
- 05. "The Morning" (performed by Raekwon, Pusha T, Common, 2 Chainz, Cyhi the Prynce, Kid Cudi, D'banj, and Kanye West) (produced with Julian Nixon, Kanye West, Illmind, & Jeff Bhasker)
- 08. "Sin City" (performed by John Legend, Scott, Teyana Taylor, Cyhi the Prynce, and Malik Yusef) (produced with Tommy Brown)

== 2013 ==
=== Various artists – DJ Drama Presents: XXL 2013's Freshmen Class ===
- 07. "God Level" (performed by Scott) (produced with WondaGurl)

=== Hustle Gang – G.D.O.D. (Get Dough or Die) ===
- 17. "Animal" (featuring Scott, B.o.B, & T.I.) (produced with TBHits)

=== Travis Scott – Owl Pharaoh ===
- 01. "Meadow Creek"
- 02. "Bad Mood / Shit on You" (produced with Anthony Kilhoffer, Emile Haynie, & J Gramm)
- 03. "Upper Echelon" (featuring T.I. & 2 Chainz) (produced with J Gramm & Anthony Kilhoffer)
- 05. "Uptown" (featuring A$AP Ferg) (produced with WondaGurl)
- 06. "Hell of a Night" (produced with Dahi, Rey Reel, & Rahki)
- 07. "Blocka La Flame" (produced with Young Chop & Mike Dean)
- 08. "Naked" (featuring Bon Iver) (produced with J Gramm & Rick Rubin)
- 09. "Dance on the Moon" (featuring Theophilus London & Paul Wall) (produced with J Gramm)
- 10. "MIA" (produced with Lex Luger)
- 11. "Drive" (featuring James Fauntleroy) (produced with Kanye West, No I.D., & Ann Marie Calhoun)
- 12. "Quintana" (featuring Wale) (produced with SAK PASE & Anthony Kilhoffer)
- 13. "16 Chapels"
- 14. "Bandz" (featuring Meek Mill) (produced with The Dope Boyz & Mike Dean)

=== Kanye West – Yeezus ===
- 04. "New Slaves" (produced with Kanye West, Ben Bronfman, Che Pope, SAK PASE, Noah Goldstein, & Mike Dean)
- 08. "Guilt Trip" (produced with Kanye West, S1, Ackeejuice Rockers, & Mike Dean)

=== Wale – The Gifted ===
- 12. "Rotation" (featuring Wiz Khalifa & 2 Chainz) (produced with AdoTheGod)

=== Jay-Z – Magna Carta Holy Grail ===
- 08. "Crown" (produced with Kanye West, WondaGurl, & Mike Dean)

=== Trinidad James – 10pc. Mild ===
- 01. "WutEL$e" (produced with 7 King, Justin Padron, & Childish Major)
- 03. "$hut Up!!!" (featuring Scott) (produced with Young Chop)

=== Big Sean – Hall of Fame ===
- 03. "10 2 10" (produced with Young Chop, No I.D., & KeY Wane)

=== John Legend – Love in the Future ===
- 18. "We Loved It" (featuring Seal) (produced with Kanye West & Jeff Bhasker)

== 2014 ==
=== Big Sean – Bout Dat Life SXSW 2014 Mixtape ===
- "1st Quarter Freestyle" (produced with Key Wane)

=== Travis Scott – Days Before Rodeo ===
- 02. "Mamacita" (featuring Young Thug & Rich Homie Quan) (produced with Dahi & Metro Boomin)
- 05. "Don't Play" (featuring The 1975 & Big Sean) (produced with Vinylz, Allen Ritter, & Anthony Kilhoffer)
- 06. "Skyfall" (featuring Young Thug) (produced with Metro Boomin)

== 2015 ==
=== Drake – If You're Reading This It's Too Late ===
- 14. "Company" (featuring Scott) (produced with TM88, Allen Ritter, & WondaGurl)

=== Madonna – Rebel Heart ===
- 05. "Illuminati" (produced with Madonna, Kanye West, Mike Dean, Charlie Heat, & S1)

=== Travis Scott – Rodeo ===
- 01. "Pornography" (produced with Metro Boomin, Sonny Digital, & Mike Dean)
- 02. "Oh My Dis Side" (featuring Quavo) (produced with Frank Dukes, Allen Ritter, Ging, & Mike Dean)
- 03. "3500" (featuring Future & 2 Chainz) (produced with Metro Boomin, Mike Dean, Mano, Allen Ritter, & Zaytoven)
- 04. "Wasted" (featuring Juicy J) (produced with Metro Boomin, Mike Dean, & Ging)
- 05. "90210" (featuring Kacy Hill) (produced with Allen Ritter, Dahi, Mike Dean, Apex Martin, & WondaGurl)
- 06. "Pray 4 Love" (featuring The Weeknd) (produced with Allen Ritter, Ben Billions, The Weeknd, Illangelo, & Mike Dean)
- 07. "Nightcrawler" (featuring Swae Lee & Chief Keef) (produced with Allen Ritter, Metro Boomin, Southside, TM88, & Mike Dean)
- 08. "Piss on Your Grave" (featuring Kanye West) (produced with Kanye West, Wals Escobar, Mike Dean, Noah Goldstein, Darren King, & Charlie Heat)
- 09. "Antidote" (produced with Eestbound & WondaGurl)
- 10. "Impossible" (produced with Allen Ritter & Mike Dean)
- 11. "Maria I'm Drunk" (featuring Justin Bieber & Young Thug) (produced with Allen Ritter, Ging, Maneesh, & Mike Dean)
- 12. "Flying High" (featuring Toro y Moi) (produced with Allen Ritter, Mike Dean, & Pharrell Williams)
- 13. "I Can Tell" (produced with FKi, Allen Ritter, & Mike Dean)
- 14. "Apple Pie" (produced with Mike Dean, Terrace Martin, & 1500 or Nothin')

=== Rihanna – Non-album single ===
- 01. "Bitch Better Have My Money" (produced with WondaGurl, Kuk Harrell, Kanye West, & Deputy)

== 2016 ==
=== Rihanna – Anti ===
- 06. "Woo" (produced with Hit-Boy, Kuk Harrell, G Koop, Anthony Caruso, & Jean Baptiste)
- 15. "Pose" (produced with Hit-Boy & Kuk Harrell)

=== Travis Scott – Birds in the Trap Sing McKnight ===
- 14. "wonderful" (featuring The Weeknd) (produced with T-Minus, Boi-1da, & Mike Dean)

== 2018 ==
=== Migos – Culture 2 ===
- 12. "White Sand" (featuring Scott, Ty Dolla Sign, & Big Sean) (produced with DJ Durel, Wheezy, Quavo, & Ty Dolla Sign)

=== Quavo – Quavo Huncho ===
- 19. "Lost" (featuring Kid Cudi) (produced with Joseph DaVinci, Mike Almighty, Kid Cudi, Quavo, & Dot da Genius)

=== Travis Scott – ASTROWORLD ===
- 01. "STARGAZING" (produced with Allen Ritter, Mike Dean, 30 Roc, Bkorn, BWheezy, & Sonny Digital)
- 04. "R.I.P. SCREW" (featuring Swae Lee) (produced with Blair Taylor, Mike Dean, & FKi)
- 05. "STOP TRYING TO BE GOD" (featuring Stevie Wonder, Kid Cudi, James Blake, & Philip Bailey) (produced with CuBeatz, Mike Dean, JBeatzz, & Stevie Wonder)
- 07. "SKELETONS" (featuring Pharrell Williams, Tame Impala, & The Weeknd) (produced with Kevin Parker & Tame Impala)
- 11. "ASTROTHUNDER" (produced with Vegyn, John Mayer, Thundercat, & Ging)

== 2020 ==
=== Don Toliver – Heaven or Hell ===
- 04. "After Party" (produced with Sonny Digital, CuBeatz, Mike Dean, & Nils)
- 07. "Candy" (produced with WondaGurl, Mike Dean, CA$HPASSION, & Nkenge 1x)

== 2023 ==
=== Travis Scott – UTOPIA ===
- 01. "HYAENA" (produced with Mike Dean, WondaGurl, Noah Goldstein, & Jahaan Sweet)
- 02. "THANK GOD" (produced with Kanye West, Allen Ritter, BoogzDaBeast, WondaGurl, & FNZ)
- 03. "MODERN JAM" (featuring Teezo Touchdown) (produced with Guy-Manuel de Homem-Christo, Mike Dean, & Jahaan Sweet)
- 04. "MY EYES" (produced with Wheezy, Vegyn, Buddy Ross, & Justin Vernon)
- 05. "GOD'S COUNTRY" (produced with 30 Roc, Dez Wright, & ZenTachi)
- 06. "SIRENS" (produced with Buddy Ross, Jahaan Sweet, E*vax, John Mayer, Noah Goldstein, WondaGurl, BNYX, & Psymun)
- 07. "MELTDOWN" (featuring Drake) (produced with BNYX, Coleman, Boi-1da, Vinylz, & Tay Keith)
- 08. "FE!N" (featuring Playboi Carti) (produced with Jahaan Sweet)
- 09. "DELRESTO (ECHOES)" (featuring Beyoncé) (produced with Hit-Boy, Allen Ritter, Mike Dean, Beyoncé, The-Dream, & umru)
- 10. "I KNOW ?" (produced with Coleman, Oz, Buddy Ross, & 206Derek)
- 11. "TOPIA TWINS" (featuring 21 Savage & Rob49) (produced with Wheezy, Cadenza, Harry Edwards, Dez Wright, & Hoops)
- 12. "CIRCUS MAXIMUS" (featuring The Weeknd & Swae Lee) (produced with Noah Goldstein, Jahaan Sweet, WondaGurl, & Mike Dean)
- 13. "PARASAIL" (featuring Yung Lean & Dave Chappelle) (produced with Jahaan Sweet, Buddy Ross, Vegyn, Noah Goldstein, & ANTHRO)
- 15. "LOST FOREVER" (featuring Westside Gunn) (produced with Dom Maker, James Blake, The Alchemist, & Elliott Baker)
- 16. "LOOOVE" (featuring Kid Cudi) (produced with Pharrell Williams & Buddy Ross)
- 18. "TELEKINESIS" (featuring Future & SZA) (produced with BoogzDaBeast, Kanye West, Wallis Lane, Jahaan Sweet, Nabeyin, & Hudson Mohawke)
- 19. "TIL FURTHER NOTICE" (featuring James Blake & 21 Savage) (produced with Metro Boomin & James Blake)

=== YUNGMORPHEUS - From Whence It Came ===
- 03. "Escovitch Fish" (produced with Pusha T)
