= Drugs You Should Try It =

Single by Travis Scott

from the album Days Before Rodeo
- Released: August 27, 2024
- Recorded: 2014
- Genre: Psychedelic hip-hop
- Length: 3:29
- Label: Cactus Jack; Epic
- Songwriters: Jacques Webster; Michael Dean; Trocon Roberts Jr.; Ryan Vojtesak
- Producers: Travis Scott; Mike Dean; FKi 1st; Charlie Handsome

Travis Scott singles chronology
"Active" (2024)	"Drugs You Should Try It" (2024)	"South of France" (Remix) (2024)

Music video
- "Drugs You Should Try It" on YouTube

"Drugs You Should Try It" is a song by American rapper and singer Travis Scott. It was released independently as the fourth track from his second commercial mixtape, Days Before Rodeo, on August 18, 2014, and was sent to streaming services alongside the mixtape through Cactus Jack and Epic Records for its tenth anniversary on August 23, 2024. The song was written and produced by Scott himself, alongside Mike Dean, FKi 1st, and Charlie Handsome, and recorded in 2014.

The song became the third and final single from the mixtape four days later when the official music video was released, which included a tribute to the late fashion designer Virgil Abloh. Described as a moody and psychedelic hip-hop song, "Drugs You Should Try It" received positive reviews from music critics and was considered a standout track from Days Before Rodeo as well as one of Scott's best songs. Commercially, the single charted at number 66 on the Billboard Hot 100 and peaked at number 6 on the New Zealand Hot Singles.

== Composition and lyrics ==
The song features minimalist production, a reverb-heavy guitar riff, and ambient sound effects. Writing for HotNewHipHop, Zachary Horvath explained that it differed from the rest of the Southern trap of Days Before Rodeo in a positive way. Lyrically, "Drugs You Should Try It" explores themes of escapism and love, as well as drug use. Horvath describes the song as Scott at his most vulnerable, talking about "loving someone, as well as all of their druggy escapades together."

== Commercial performance ==
In the United States, the single charted at number 66 on the Billboard Hot 100 and peaked at number 13 on the Hot R&B/Hip-Hop Songs chart. In the United Kingdom, the single charted at number 84 on the UK singles chart and peaked at number 25 on the UK Hip Hop and R&B Singles Chart. In Canada, the single charted at number 63 on the Canadian Hot 100.

In New Zealand, the single charted at number 6 on the New Zealand Hot Singles chart, its highest position on any chart It made. In Portugal, the single charted at number 73 on the Portuguese Singles Chart. In Switzerland, the single charted at number 49 on the Schweizer Hitparade. The single also charted at number 91 on the Global 200.

== Charts ==
Chart performance for "Drugs You Should Try It"
Chart (2024)	Peak position
Canada Hot 100 (Billboard)	63
Global 200 (Billboard)	91
New Zealand Hot Singles (RMNZ)	6
Portugal (AFP)	73
Switzerland (Schweizer Hitparade)	49
UK Singles (Official Charts)	84
UK Hip Hop/R&B (Official Charts)	25
US Billboard Hot 100	66
US Hot R&B/Hip-Hop Songs (Billboard)	13
