= Billboard Music Award for Top Rap Male Artist =

Annual American music award

The Billboard Music Award winners for Top Male Rap Artist (2018–present).

== Winners and nominees ==
Winners are listed first and highlighted in bold.

Year	Artist	Ref.
2018	**Kendrick Lamar**	
2018	Drake	
2018	Post Malone	
2019	**Drake**	
2019	Post Malone	
2019	Travis Scott	
2020	**Post Malone**	
2020	DaBaby	
2020	Lil Nas X	
2021	**Pop Smoke**	
2021	Juice WRLD	
2021	Lil Baby	
2022	**Drake**	
2022	Juice WRLD	
2022	Polo G	
2023	**Drake**	
2023	21 Savage	
2023	Travis Scott	
2024	**Drake**	
2024	Kendrick Lamar	
2024	Travis Scott	
