= Travis Scott =

American rapper (born 1991)

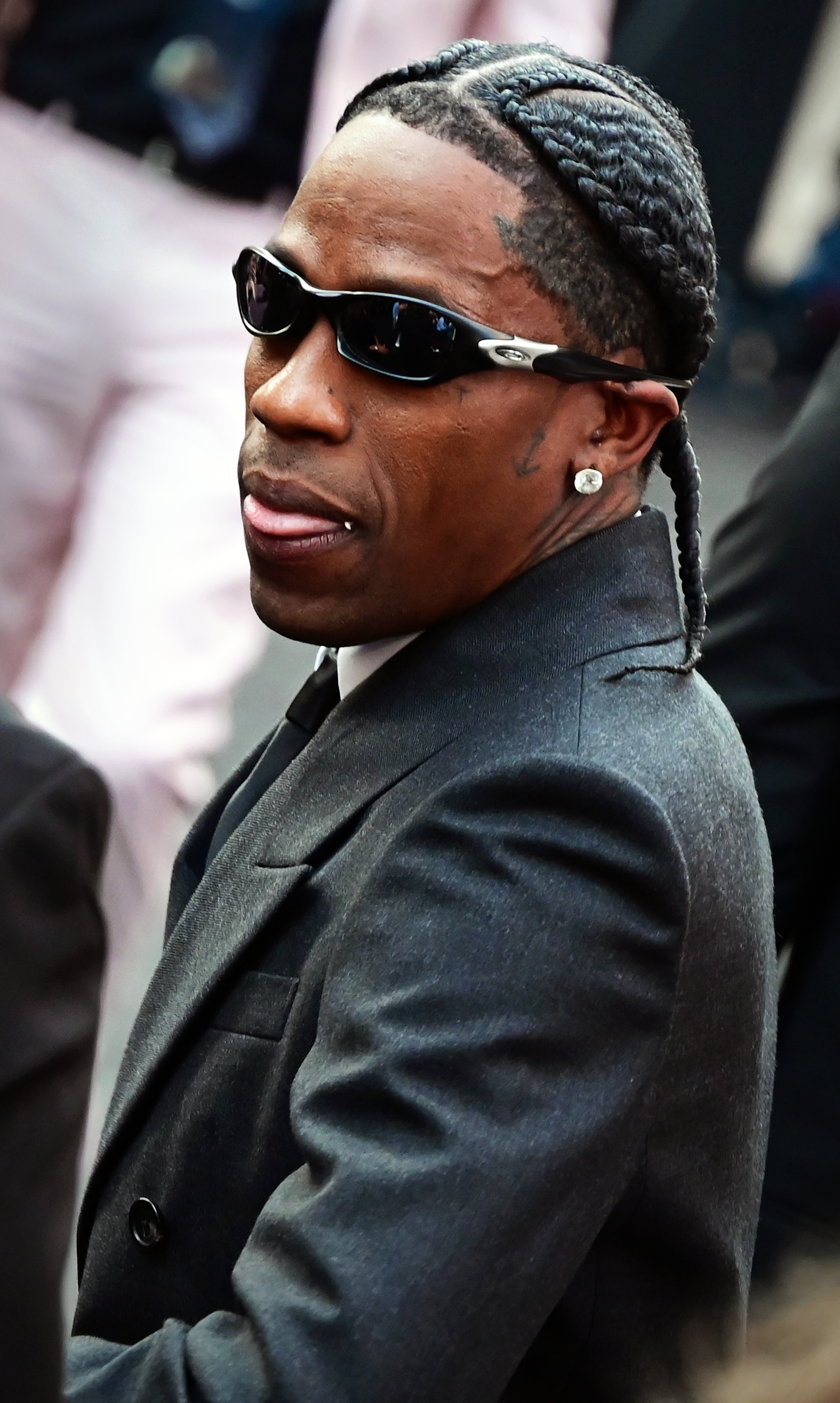
- Scott in 2026
- Born: Jacques Bermon Webster II; April 30, 1991 (age 35); Houston, Texas, U.S.
- Other names: La Flame; Cactus Jack; Trav
- Occupations: Rapper; singer-songwriter; record producer
- Years active: 2008–present
- Works: Discography; production
- Partner: Kylie Jenner (2017–2023)
- Children: 2
- Awards: Full list
- Musical career
- Origin: Missouri City, Texas, U.S.
- Genres: Hip-hop; trap; pop rap; psychedelic rap
- Labels: Grand Hustle; Epic; Very GOOD Beats; Cactus Jack
- Member of: Huncho Jack; The Scotts; JackBoys
- Formerly of: The Classmates; The Graduates
- Website: travisscott.com

Jacques Bermon Webster II (born April 30, 1991), known professionally as Travis Scott, is an American rapper, singer-songwriter, and record producer. Scott has had five number-one hits on the U.S. Billboard Hot 100 chart, along with a total of over one hundred charting songs. In addition to ten Grammy Award nominations, he has won a Latin Grammy Award, Billboard Music Award, MTV Video Music Award, and several BET Hip Hop Awards. Scott is known for his dynamic live performances, eclectic musical style and fashion, while taking influences from artists including Kanye West and Kid Cudi.

In 2012, Scott signed his first major-label recording contract with Epic Records, as well as a publishing deal with Kanye West's GOOD Music as an in-house producer. In April 2013, he entered a joint-venture record deal with Georgia-based rapper T.I.'s Grand Hustle Records. Scott self-released his first full-length project, a mixtape titled Owl Pharaoh in 2013, which was followed by his second mixtape, Days Before Rodeo (2014). His debut studio album, Rodeo (2015), was met with critical and commercial success; It spawned the singles "3500" (featuring Future and 2 Chainz) and "Antidote", the latter peaked at number 16 on the Billboard Hot 100. His second album, Birds in the Trap Sing McKnight (2016), became his first number-one album on the Billboard 200 chart. In the following year, Scott formed the duo Huncho Jack with rapper Quavo, with whom he released an eponymous collaborative album (2017).

Scott's third studio album, Astroworld (2018), was released to widespread critical acclaim and became his second consecutive number-one album on the Billboard 200. It yielded his first Billboard Hot 100 number-one single, "Sicko Mode" (featuring Drake). In late 2019, Scott's vanity label imprint, Cactus Jack Records, released the compilation album JackBoys, which also topped the Billboard 200. With his 2019 single "Highest in the Room" and his 2020 singles "The Scotts" (with Kid Cudi) and "Franchise" (featuring Young Thug and M.I.A.), Scott became the first artist on the Billboard Hot 100 to have three songs debut at number one in less than a year. Following a series of controversies and five years after the release of Astroworld, Scott released Utopia (2023), his fourth studio album, which became his fourth consecutive number-one album on the Billboard 200 with 496,000 equivalent album units in its opening week. The album spawned the Billboard Hot 100 top-ten singles "Meltdown" (featuring Drake), "Fein" (featuring Playboi Carti), and "K-pop" (with Bad Bunny and The Weeknd). “Fein” later peaked at number five on the Billboard Hot 100.^{[296]} To accompany Utopia, Scott also co-directed and released the short film Circus Maximus, which combined music and experimental cinema. In 2025, he released the single "4x4", which peaked atop the Billboard Hot 100. His second collaboration with JackBoys, JackBoys 2, charted atop the Billboard 200, making it Scott's sixth consecutive number-one album overall on the chart.

Along with his highly publicized relationship with American media personality Kylie Jenner, Scott has collaborated with organizations including Nike, Dior, Audemars Piguet, and McDonald's. His Cactus Jack record label, founded in 2017, has signed artists including Don Toliver, SoFaygo, and Sheck Wes, and has expanded into organizing events such as CactusCon, a multi-day festival blending music, fashion, and art. Scott has gained notoriety for controversies and legal issues regarding concert safety. In November 2021, a mass-casualty crowd crush occurred during Scott's hometown performance at his annual Astroworld Festival, causing ten deaths and hundreds of injuries.

== Early life ==
Jacques Bermon Webster II was born on April 30, 1991, in Houston, Texas, the son of Wanda, who worked for AT&T, and Jacques Bermon Webster, an entrepreneur and musician. From ages one through six, Webster lived with his grandmother in South Park, Houston. The neighborhood was notorious for crime and had an impact on a young Webster, "Growing up, my grandmother stayed in the 'hood so I seen random crazy shit. [I saw] mad bums and crazy spazzed out motherfuckers, I saw people looking weird, hungry, and [grimy]. I was always like, 'I gotta get the fuck out this shit.' It gave me my edge—[it made me] who I am right now." (Note: [sic])

Webster moved to Missouri City, a middle-class suburban area bordering southwest Houston, to live with his parents. His mother worked for Apple and his father ran his own business. Webster's father is also a soul musician and his grandfather was a jazz composer. Webster attended Elkins High School and graduated at seventeen. During high school, he participated in musical theater. Webster then attended the University of Texas at San Antonio, before dropping out his second year to fully pursue his music career. During an interview, Webster revealed he chose his moniker as a combination of his favorite uncle, Travis, and the first name of one of his biggest inspirations, Kid Cudi (whose real name is Scott Mescudi).

== Career ==
=== 2008–2012: Career beginnings and record deals ===
Webster formed a duo with his longtime friend Chris Holloway known as The Graduates. In 2008, the duo released their untitled first EP on social networking website Myspace. The following year, Scott and OG Chess, one of Scott's schoolmates, formed the group The Classmates. The Classmates released two projects, with Buddy Rich in 2009 and Cruis'n USA in 2010. Scott mainly handled production work on both projects. The duo remained together until late 2012, when personal conflicts and financial disputes led to the disbandment of the group.

After leaving college, Scott moved from Houston to Washington Heights in New York City where Scott began working with friend Mike Waxx, who owned the music website Illroots. After moving to New York, Scott slept on the floor at his friend's house and spent most of his time at Just Blaze's studio. Eventually frustrated in New York and the lack of progression, Scott moved to Los Angeles, California, after only four months in the state. In Los Angeles, Webster was abandoned by his friend who had promised to help him by providing housing. His parents cut him off financially and he eventually was forced to relocate back to Houston, where his parents kicked him out of their home. Webster moved back to Los Angeles once again and began to sleep on the couch of a friend who studied at University of Southern California. Atlanta-based rapper and owner of Grand Hustle Records, T.I. would later hear one of Webster's productions, titled "Lights (Love Sick)". While in Los Angeles, T.I.'s representative contacted Webster, asking him to attend a studio for a meeting. During the meeting, T.I. freestyled over "Animal", one of Webster's productions.

=== 2012–2014: Owl Pharaoh and Days Before Rodeo ===
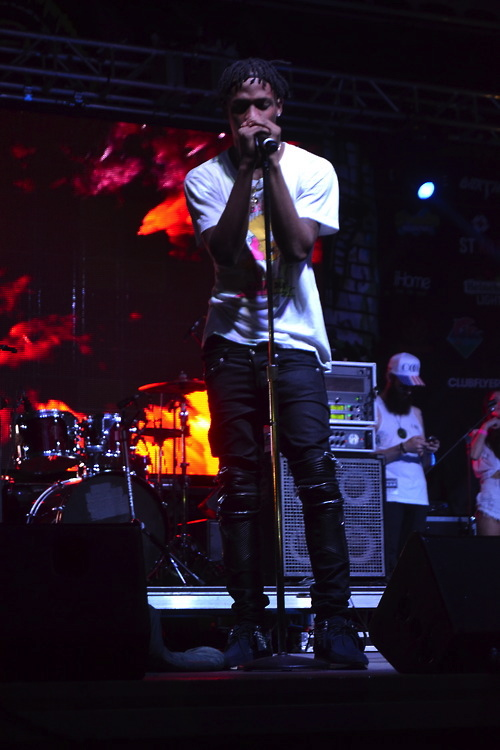
Scott performing in 2013

Scott's first solo full-length project is his mixtape titled Owl Pharaoh, which was set to be released as a free download in 2012. However, the project was delayed, and was announced to be slated for a later release. The project was later re-created by Kanye West and Mike Dean, and was then again delayed for sample clearance issues. In promotion Scott would release the track, "Blocka La Flame", a remix of fellow GOOD Music label-mate Pusha T's single "Blocka" (which features production and vocals from Scott). The song was produced by Young Chop, with additional production by Scott himself, alongside Mike Dean. On March 22, 2013, Scott released the music video for a song titled "Quintana", set to appear on Owl Pharaoh. On March 27, XXL revealed that Scott was a member of their Freshman Class of 2013. Later on March 29, 2013, following his interview with British disc jockey, DJ Semtex, Scott premiered a snippet of his commercial debut single, titled "Upper Echelon", featuring 2 Chainz and T.I. On April 2, 2013, Scott stated Owl Pharaoh was his official debut mixtape and would be released on the iTunes Store on May 21, 2013. On April 23, 2013, "Upper Echelon" was sent to urban contemporary radio.

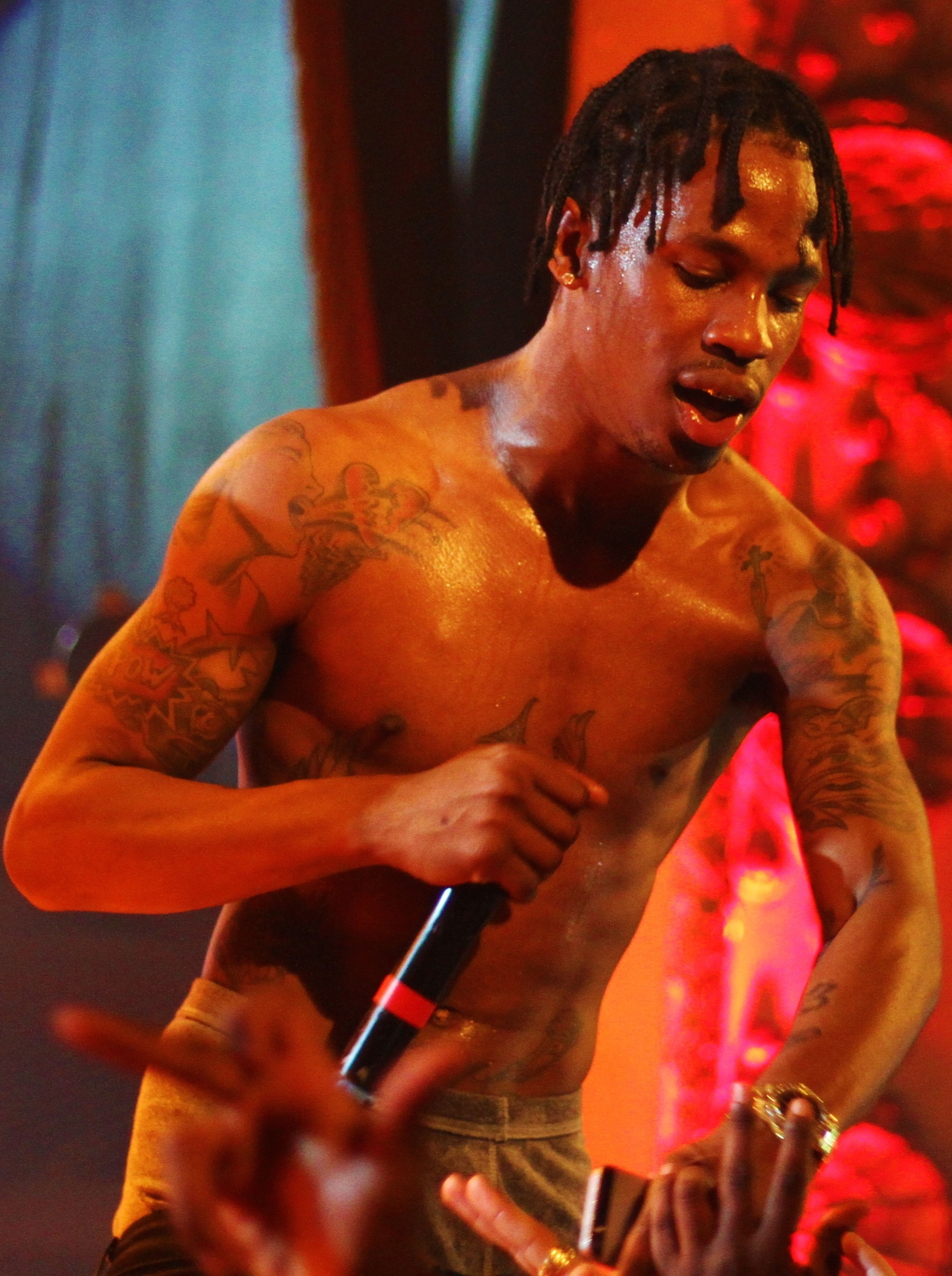
Scott performing in 2014

On March 13, 2014, Scott performed a new song, tentatively titled "1975" featuring Big Sean, from his upcoming project at the time, at the Texan music festival South by Southwest (SXSW). Scott later confirmed via his Twitter account that the song is not called "1975", and would be included on his second mixtape, titled Days Before Rodeo. He would later take to his Twitter account to announce Rodeo, as the official title for his major-label debut studio album. On May 5, 2014, Scott released the full version of the song, with its new title "Don't Play", featuring a sample of the song "M.O.N.E.Y" by the English rock band the 1975. On July 11, 2014, "Don't Play" was officially released as the lead single from Days Before Rodeo, via digital distribution.

Following the success of Days Before Rodeo, Scott announced that he would headline a concert tour, called The Rodeo Tour, with rapper Young Thug and producer Metro Boomin. The tour started on March 1, 2015, in Santa Ana, California, and ended on April 1, 2015, in Portland, Oregon. The tour ran through major cities and artists such as Kanye West, Chris Brown, Wale and Birdman made special guest appearances in certain cities.

=== 2015–2016: Rodeo and Birds in the Trap Sing McKnight ===
Rodeo was released on September 4, 2015, by Grand Hustle and Epic Records. The album debuted at #3 on the Billboard 200, selling 85,000 album-equivalent units in the first week. The album features guest appearances from Quavo, Juicy J, Kanye West, The Weeknd, Swae Lee, Chief Keef, Justin Bieber, Young Thug and Toro y Moi, and includes production from Mike Dean, Kanye West, WondaGurl, Suber, DJ Dahi, Metro Boomin, 1500 or Nothin', Sonny Digital, Southside, Terrace Martin, Zaytoven, Pharrell Williams and Scott himself, among others. The album was supported by two singles: "3500" featuring Future and 2 Chainz, and "Antidote". The latter became his highest-charting single on the US Billboard Hot 100 chart, peaking at number 16, and achieving a septuple Platinum certification by the RIAA. Rodeo received generally positive reviews from critics and debuted at number three on the U.S. Billboard 200 chart. It also debuted at number one on the Billboard Rap Albums chart.

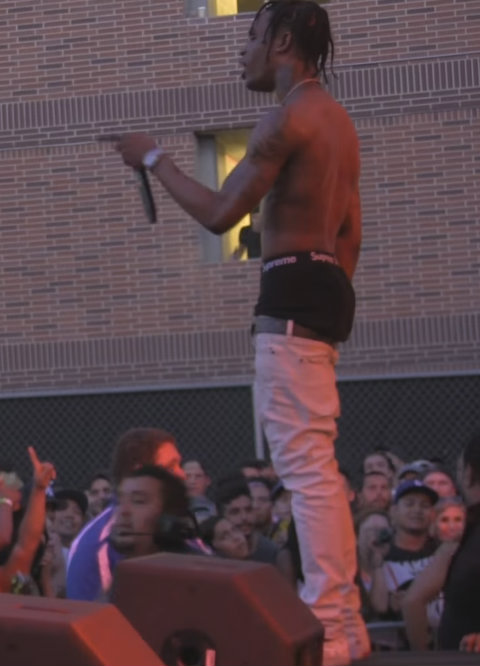
Scott performing in August 2015

On January 4, 2016, Scott announced that he had a new studio album on the way. On March 29, 2016, 300 Entertainment executive Lyor Cohen, revealed that Scott and Young Thug were releasing a single together and called Scott's upcoming album a "classic". On April 7, 2016, Scott previewed a single with Young Thug at one of his shows. On May 17, 2016, Scott announced that the title of his second album would be Birds in the Trap Sing McKnight, while also confirming the title for his third album to be Astroworld. On June 3, 2016, the collaborative single between Thug and Scott was released, titled "Pick Up the Phone". The single, which also features vocals from Quavo of Atlanta-based rap trio Migos, reached number 43 on the Billboard Hot 100 and was certified double platinum by the Recording Industry Association of America (RIAA).

On August 31, 2016, Scott announced that Birds in the Trap Sing McKnight was finally finished in a post on Instagram. Scott premiered the album on his third episode of .wav radio on September 2, 2016, and was later released on iTunes and Apple Music. On September 11, 2016, the album became Scott's first number one album on the U.S. Billboard 200. The album’s single “Pick Up the Phone” (with Young Thug) peaked at #43 on the Billboard Hot 100 and was certified quadruple Platinum. A day later, Universal Music Publishing Group's CEO, Jody Gerson announced that the label signed a worldwide deal with Scott.

In the same episode Scott premiered Birds in the Trap Sing McKnight, he also announced that he would be executive producing on Kanye West's Cruel Winter, a follow-up to his G.O.O.D. Music label's debut compilation Cruel Summer. In the episode he described the upcoming album as, "very youthful, straight to the point, like the illest ever, man, like the illest album".

=== 2017–2018: Cactus Jack Records, Huncho Jack, Jack Huncho, and Astroworld ===
Scott performed at All-Star Weekend on February 16, 2017, in New Orleans, Louisiana at Champion Square. He also performed at New Orleans BUKU Music + Art Project festival on March 10, 2017. On March 5, Scott announced a concert tour called "Birds Eye View". The next day, the dates and cities for the tour were unveiled, with it beginning on March 10, in New Orleans, Louisiana, and coming to an end on June 2, in Eugene, Oregon. In the same month, Scott was also featured alongside American rapper Quavo from the hip-hop group Migos on Canadian rapper Drake's single "Portland", from Drake's commercial mixtape, More Life. The song peaked at number nine on the US Billboard Hot 100, becoming his first top ten song as a featured artist. In March 2017, Scott announced he would be launching his own imprint, under the name of Cactus Jack Records.

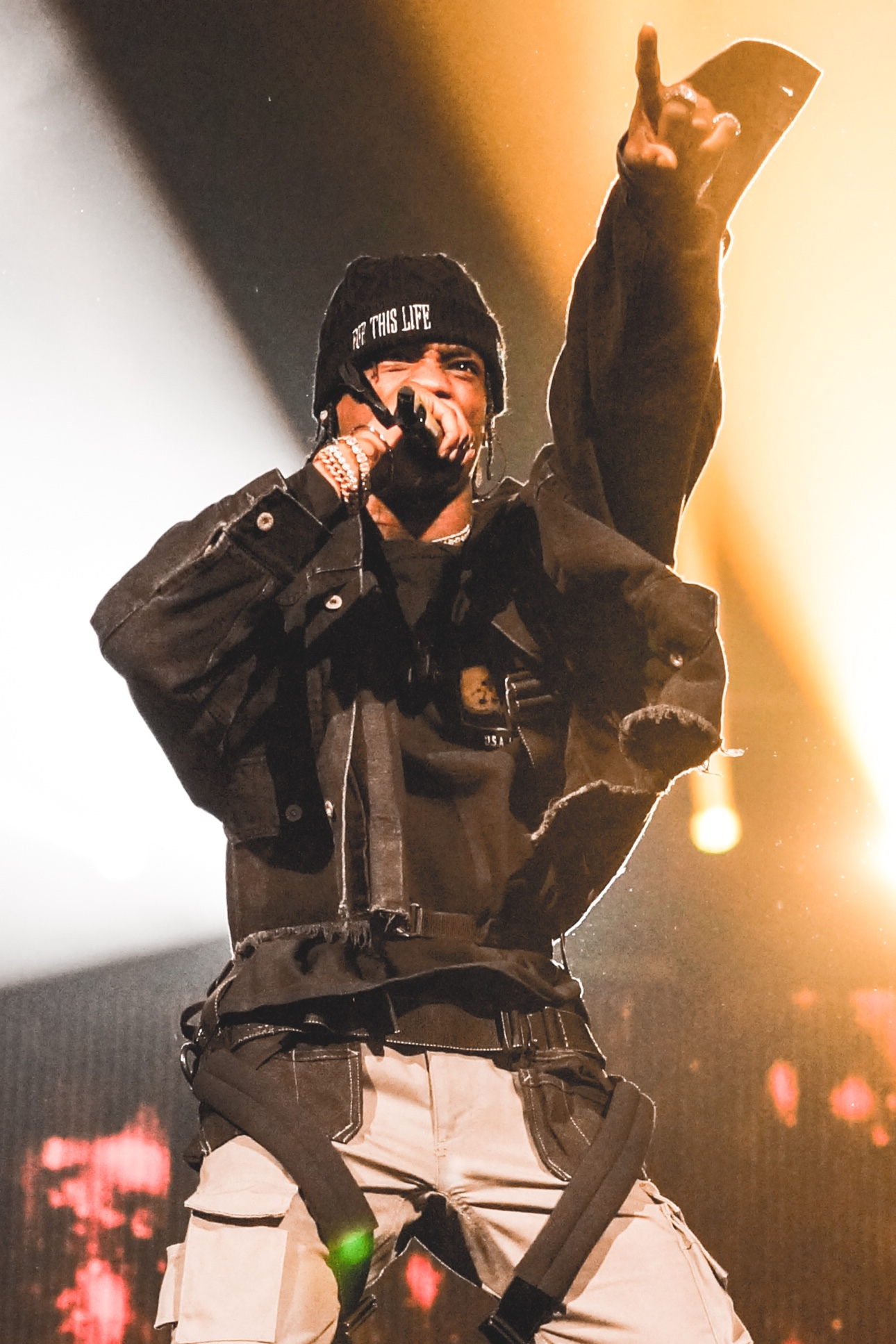
Scott performing at TD Stadium on The Damn Tour in 2017.

On April 3, 2017, it was reported Scott had been working on a collaborative studio album with Quavo, potentially to be released later in 2017. Speaking to GQ, he confirmed: 'The Quavo album is coming soon. I'm dropping new music soon. You know how I do it though: I like surprises. In addition to the collaborative album, Scott announced his third studio album Astroworld, named after the defunct Houston theme park of the same name, was nearing completion and would most likely be released in 2017.

On May 16, 2017, Scott released three new tracks on SoundCloud, after teasing on social media for some time. The tracks were named "A Man", "Green & Purple (featuring Playboi Carti)", and "Butterfly Effect". The latter was also released on every other streaming service, as the only track. On June 15, 2017, Scott announced he would be doing a European leg of the "Birds Eye View Tour". The European leg started on the June 23 in Paris, and concluded on July 9 in Turku, Finland. This leg was mainly festival sets or in smaller club settings. The music video for "Butterfly Effect" was released on July 14, 2017. On August 10, 2017, Scott tweeted "ALBUM MODE" as he had just finished the "DAMN. Tour" as a supporting act for Kendrick Lamar, the night before. This tweet signified that he was now working on his album AstroWorld full-time. On August 27, 2017, Scott performed with Thirty Seconds to Mars at the 2017 MTV Video Music Awards on their single "Walk On Water".

On September 18, 2017, Quavo and Migos did an interview, in which Quavo stated that his album with Scott was coming "real soon". He also stated that he and Scott had over 20 records ready. In October 2017, Scott was featured in a special piece titled "Deserve", by Canadian rapper Kris Wu. On December 7, 2017, a clip of Quavo being interviewed by Zane Lowe was posted on the official Twitter account for Beats 1. When asked about the title of their upcoming project, he confirmed it would be Huncho Jack, Jack Huncho.

On December 6, 2017, Scott was featured on fellow American rapper and singer Trippie Redd's single "Dark Knight Dummo", the lead single from the latter's debut studio album, Life's a Trip. The song peaked at 72 on the Billboard Hot 100. On December 21, 2017, Scott and Quavo released their collaborative studio album, Huncho Jack, Jack Huncho, under the name "Huncho Jack", a name which comes from Quavo's nickname "Huncho" and a play on Scott's first name "Jack". The album debuted at number 3 on the Billboard 200 and had seven tracks chart on the Billboard Hot 100. After the release of Huncho Jack, Jack Huncho, Webster was spotted in the studio a lot more frequently and Billboard slated an expected first quarter release for AstroWorld.

On May 4, 2018, Scott released a single titled "Watch" featuring American rappers Lil Uzi Vert and Kanye West. The single was released as promotional material for his third studio album Astroworld. Astroworld was released on August 3, 2018, to critical acclaim, and debuted at number one on the Billboard 200, with 537,000 album-equivalent units in its first week, making it one of the biggest hip-hop debuts of the decade. "Sicko Mode", the album's second single, peaked at number one on the Billboard Hot 100, becoming Scott's highest charting solo single, earning 15× Platinum certification and being nominated for two Grammys. On the same month of the album's launch, Scott announced that he was going to launch Astroworld Festival, a music festival with the same name as the album. The festival took place on November 17. On November 2, 2018, Scott was featured on five tracks of Metro Boomin's debut studio album, Not All Heroes Wear Capes: "Overdue", "Dreamcatcher" (alongside Swae Lee), "Up to Something" (alongside Young Thug), "Only 1 (Interlude)", and "No More" (alongside Kodak Black and 21 Savage), as well as background vocals on "Space Cadet" (featuring Gunna). In December, Billboard reported that Scott was to make a guest appearance at the Super Bowl LIII halftime show during Maroon 5's set.

In December 2018, Scott was also featured in a cover story for Rolling Stone titled “Travis Scott: In Orbit With Rap's Newest Superstar.”

=== 2019–2020: Look Mom I Can Fly, JackBoys, and "The Scotts" ===
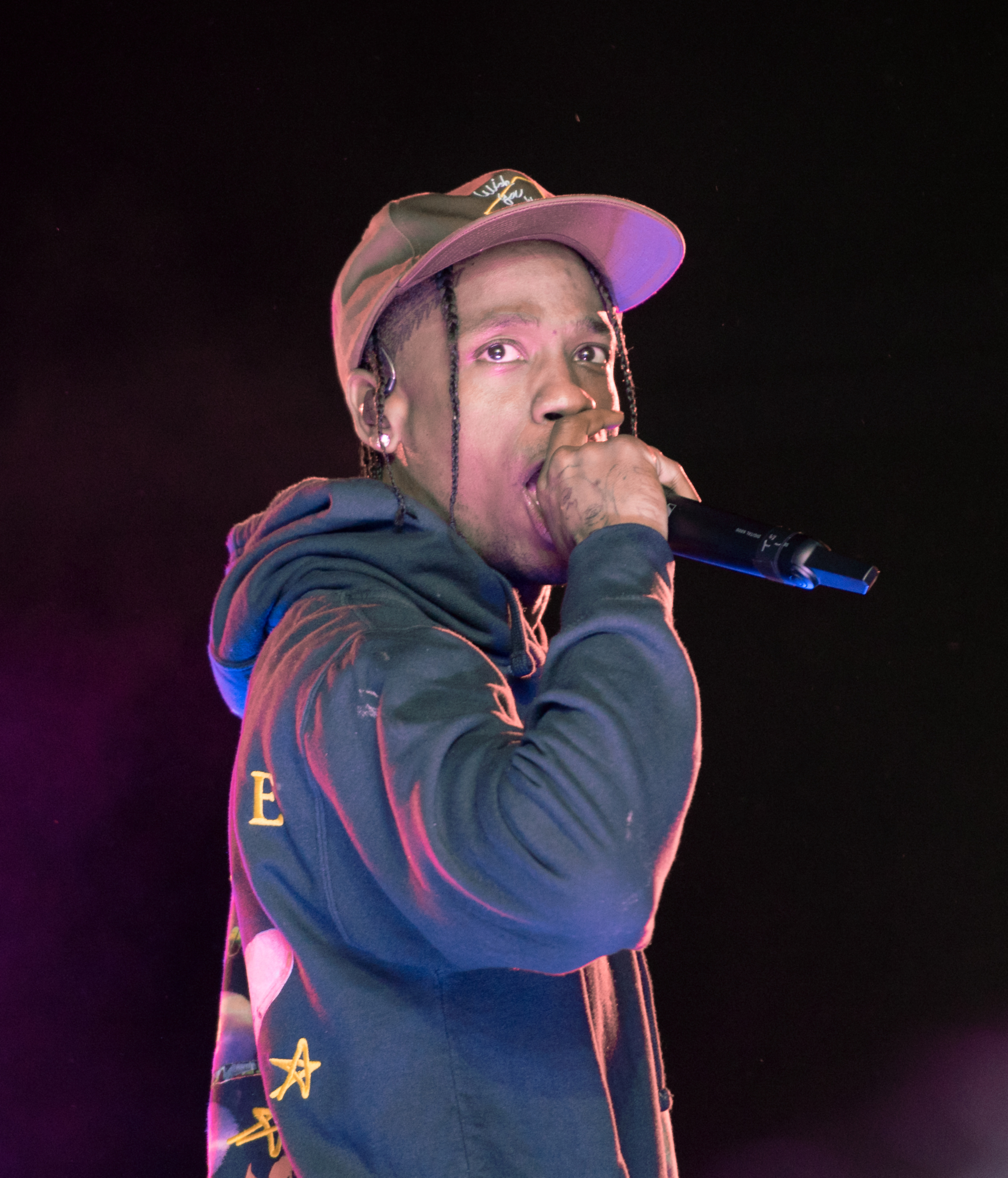
Scott performing at Openair Frauenfeld in 2019

On April 18, 2019, Scott released a single with SZA and The Weeknd for the popular HBO series Game of Thrones. It is titled "Power is Power" and is a reference to a scene that took place in the first episode of the show's second season. The track is the second song on the Game of Thrones soundtrack album entitled For the Throne. On May 23, 2019, Scott was featured alongside J. Cole on Young Thug's single, "The London", which later appeared as the lead single on Thug's debut studio album, So Much Fun. On August 28, 2019, Scott's documentary film, Look Mom I Can Fly, was released on Netflix. On October 4, 2019, Scott released a single, "Highest in the Room", which debuted and peaked at number one on the Hot 100, being his first song to debut at the top and his second number one following "Sicko Mode" in 2018. The same month, Scott was also featured on the remix of Young Thug's single, "Hot" with Gunna, who was featured on the original song as well. The song was later added to the deluxe edition of So Much Fun in December of that year. Scott also was featured on the track "Hop Off a Jet" from the deluxe edition.

On December 2, 2019, Scott announced a compilation album with his Cactus Jack label members, consisting of Don Toliver, Sheck Wes and producer Chase B (collectively known as JackBoys, titled JackBoys. On December 24, Scott revealed the album's release date via Instagram. The album was released on December 27, 2019, and featured a remix of "Highest in the Room" featuring Spanish singer Rosalía and American rapper Lil Baby, the latter's verse being leaked months prior. On the same day, Scott released the music video for "Gang Gang" performed by Wes, with uncredited vocals and cameo appearances from Scott, Toliver, and rapper Luxury Tax 50. On December 30, 2019, Scott released the music video for "Gatti", featuring Pop Smoke. On March 20, 2020, Scott released the music video for "Out West", featuring Young Thug. The single “Out West” was also the subject of a viral TikTok dance challenge in 2020. The album also featured Scott’s second collaboration with Don Tolliver, “What to Do?” After the label compilation’s release, the album JackBoys topped the Billboard 200. In 2020, Scott became the first artist in Billboard Hot 100 history to debut three songs at number one within a 12‑month span with “Highest in the Room,” “The Scotts” (with Kid Cudi) and “Franchise.” The project was supported by a short film blending surreal visuals with cinematic storytelling.

Scott performed five virtual live shows in the video game Fortnite Battle Royale from April 23 to 25, 2020 with visuals based on his Astroworld tour. It received more than 27 million viewers and boosted the sales of Fortnite-branded Cactus Jack products such as action figures. The performance also included the premiere of his new song with Kid Cudi, who released the song, "The Scotts", as a duo under the same name. Tying with the performance, numerous cosmetic items for player avatars based on Scott and the concert were available to purchase by players of Fortnite Battle Royale. The song debuted at number-one on the Billboard Hot 100, becoming Scott's third U.S. number-one. In May he collaborated for a second time with Rosalía on her track "TKN", where he raps in Spanish for the first time. Scott was on the cover of GQ's September 2020 issue, and revealed he will be releasing a collaborative album with Kid Cudi. This follows their number-one single, "The Scotts", released earlier in May.

On the second anniversary of his third studio album Astroworld, Scott teased he was working on a new project. On August 22, 2020, Scott released the single "The Plan", the theme song to Christopher Nolan's film Tenet. He released the single "Franchise" featuring rappers Young Thug and M.I.A. on September 25, 2020. The song was previously previewed on Scott and Chase B's WAV radio, titled "White Tee". It debuted at number one on the U.S. Billboard Hot 100, and Scott became the first artist in Billboard chart history to have three songs debut at number one in less than a year. A remix with an additional feature from American rapper Future, was released on October 7, 2020.

=== 2021–2022: Return to performing ===
Scott performing at Rolling Loud in Miami in 2021

From mid to late-2020, Scott began teasing his fourth studio album Utopia. On January 15, 2021, Scott released a remix of "Goosebumps" with producer HVME. After canceling the third annual Astroworld Fest due to the COVID-19 pandemic, Scott announced the return of the festival in 2021 and expanded it to a multi day format. On April 30, Scott collaborated with Baby Keem on the song "Durag Activity" from his album The Melodic Blue. In June, Scott announced a collaboration between Dior and Cactus Jack for the 2022 Summer Men's collection.

On August 28, Scott was featured on Kanye West's tenth studio album Donda on the song "Praise God" also with Baby Keem. On September 3, Scott appeared on Drake's Certified Lover Boy on the song "Fair Trade", which peaked in the top 10 of the Hot 100 at number three. On October 8, Don Toliver released an album Life of a Don, which featured Scott on songs titled "Flocky Flocky" and "You". On October 30, 2021, Scott closed out day 3 of Rolling Loud NYC. During the set he performed the unreleased song "Escape Plan" and a preview of another unreleased track off Utopia. In November 2021, he announced new music to be released on November 5, 2021; he was believed to release a project reportedly titled Dystopia, but instead he released a two-song single "Escape Plan / Mafia".

On April 22, 2022, Scott was featured on his first song since the Astroworld Festival crowd crush, "Hold That Heat" alongside Future and producer Southside. On April 27, 2022, the Primavera Sound festival announced that Scott is scheduled to perform at their festivals held in Buenos Aires, Santiago, and São Paulo respectively. On May 15, 2022, he performed at the 2022 Billboard Music Awards. This performance was his first since the Astroworld Festival tragedy in 2021. On August 6, 2022, Scott performed his first solo show since the Astroworld Festival tragedy at The O2 Arena in London. That month, it was also announced that Scott would begin a Las Vegas nightclub residency titled "Road to Utopia" in September. On December 2, Scott appeared on Metro Boomin's second studio album Heroes & Villains in four tracks including "Raindrops (Insane)", "Trance" (alongside Young Thug), "Niagara Falls (Foot or 2)" (alongside 21 Savage), and "Lock on Me" (alongside Future), as well as background vocals on "Creepin'" (with The Weeknd and 21 Savage).

=== 2023–present: Utopia, film, tour, and re-release activity ===
On March 19, 2023, Scott and DJ Calvin Harris performed at MDLBEAST in Jeddah, on the eve of the Saudi Arabian Grand Prix. On July 21, 2023, Scott released the lead single to Utopia, "K-pop" with Bad Bunny and The Weeknd. On July 28, Scott released his fourth studio album, Utopia, to mixed reviews, consisting of 19 tracks and alongside his debut directorial musical film Circus Maximus which he also wrote and starred in. He co-directed the film with filmmaker Harmony Korine. The 75-minute anthology film was screened in select AMC Theaters and later made available on Apple Music and YouTube. Utopia featured KayCyy, Teezo Touchdown, Bon Iver, Sampha, Drake, Playboi Carti, Sheck Wes, Beyoncé, Rob49, 21 Savage, the Weeknd, Yung Lean, Young Thug, James Blake, Westside Gunn, Kid Cudi, Bad Bunny, Future, and SZA. The album debuted at number one on the Billboard 200, becoming his fourth consecutive album to do so (including JackBoys), and remained at number one for four weeks after its release. The album 496,000 first-week units sold, and remained in the Top 10 for 12 weeks and in the Top 15 for 23 weeks. The album’s single “Fein” also peaked at number five on the Billboard Hot 100. “Fein” garnered over 1.5 billion global streams. Utopia amassed 7.1 billion global streams, ranking as the best-selling hip-hop album of 2023. Scott later starred as crime lord Zion in Korine's film Aggro Dr1ft, which premiered at the 80th Venice International Film Festival in September 2023, and became publicly available through Korine's website in June 2024.

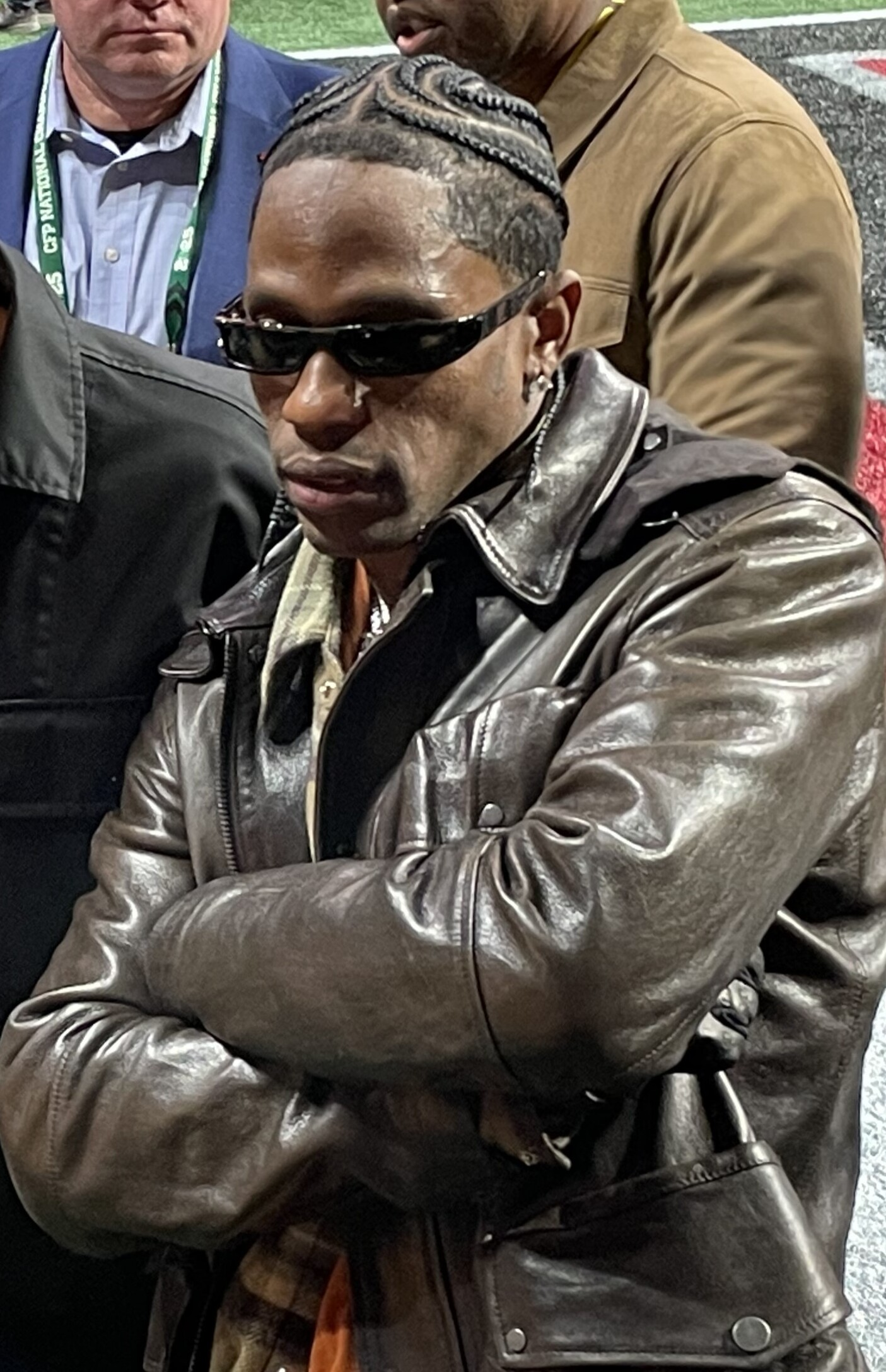
Scott at Mercedes-Benz Stadium in 2025

In November 2023, Scott was profiled for a GQ Men of the Year issue cover story titled “The Reemergence of Travis Scott.” In the same year, Scott collaborated with PIN-UP Magazine for a feature in which as the cover star, Scott posed with his body contorted into the 26 letters of the alphabet. To support Utopia, Scott staged a series of events, including a concert at Rome’s Circus Maximus. The subsequent “Utopia - Circus Maximus'' Tour ran into 2024 with dates at venues such as SoFi Stadium and the Circus Maximus in Rome and was reported to have grossed about $209 million, being recorded as the highest-grossing tour by a solo rapper at the time. On February 4, 2024, Scott performed at the 2024 Grammy Awards. Scott performed "My Eyes", "Fein", and "I Know ?" from Utopia, which was nominated for Rap Album of the year. His performance of "Fein" was accompanied by guest Playboi Carti, who features on the album version of the song, but caused controversy as Scott was heard referencing his 10 nominations without a victory at the award show that year.

On August 18, 2024, in celebration of the 10th anniversary of Days Before Rodeo, Scott announced that a remastered version of the mixtape would be released on August 23. This marked the first time that the complete mixtape was available on streaming platforms. The mixtape would debut at number two on the Billboard 200, with 361,000 album-equivalent units sold in its first week (331,000 in pure album sales)—debuting below Sabrina Carpenter's album Short n' Sweet which debuted atop the chart with 1,000 more units (362,000). Tracks from the mixtape like “Drugs You Should Try It” and “Mamacita” also charted on the Billboard Hot 100. The mixtape would drop to number 30 in its second week, and then dropped to number 106 in its third week. Days Before Rodeo would jump 105 positions to the number-one spot in its fourth week, earning 156,000 album-equivalent units—this became the ninth-largest jump to number one on the Billboard 200. In October 2024, Scott was featured in Rolling Stone again after winning the I Am Hip Hop Award at the 2024 BET Hip Hop Awards.

On January 24, 2025, Scott released the single "4×4", which would debut at number one on the Billboard Hot 100, becoming his fifth-number one single on the chart. A week later, he collaborated with Florence and the Machine and The Weeknd on the song "Reflections Laughing" from the latter's sixth studio album Hurry Up Tomorrow. In May of that year, Scott was announced as Spanish soccer team FC Barcelona's sponsor as part of the Spotify artist collaboration campaign. He has also performed an exclusive concert to promote the team's May 11 El Clásico match against Real Madrid. On July 10, 2025, Scott announced the long-teased compilation album JackBoys 2, released on July 13, 2025. The album opened at number one on the Billboard 200, selling 232,000 units in its first week. The album secured Travis Scott’s second #1 debut in less than a year (with single “4X4” charting earlier in January). In addition to Scott, artists such as Don Toliver, Sheck Wes, SoFaygo, and Wallie the Sensei contributed to the tape. In July 2025, Scott and several other artists on the record were featured in a cover story for The Source, which discussed the album JackBoys 2. In February 2026, producer Havoc revealed that Scott and Kanye West were working on a collaboration project. Scott was later featured on the track "Father" on West's album Bully.

In 2026, Scott was revealed to be reuniting with Christopher Nolan in his film The Odyssey, which was released in July 2026. Scott acted as a bard in the film, which Nolan compared the story being passed on through oral poetry to his career as a rapper. He also contributed an original song, "When I'm Home," which features James Blake and the film's composer Ludwig Göransson and plays over the film's end credits. Scott subsequently signed a first-look deal with Paramount Pictures.

== Other ventures ==
=== Cactus Jack Records ===
Cactus Jack Records is an American record label founded by Scott in 2017. It is distributed by Epic Records. The label also has its own publishing division Cactus Jack Publishing. Don Toliver is a fellow Houston artist who Travis signed to the label in 2018. Shortly before announcing the deal, Toliver dropped his first major label project, Donny Womack. He gained recognition for his guest appearance on Travis' Astroworld cut, "Can't Say". Chase B is Travis Scott's DJ, as well as an artist in his own right. Sheck Wes signed to the label shortly after picking up buzz early in his career. Wes released his debut album, Mudboy in 2018 and worked with Cactus Jack labelmates on Astroworld, as well as Chase B's 2019 single, "Mayday", which also features Young Thug.

Cactus Jack Records represents producers Chase B and WondaGurl. Rapper SoFaygo signed to Cactus Jack Records in 2020. Later in 2021, Scott signed Malu Trevejo to Cactus Jack Records. Trevejo signed to Travis Scott's label in partnership with Atlantic Records. During an interview regarding the label, Scott said,

I want first and foremost to help other artists, launch new names, to provide opportunities. I want to do for them what happened to me, but better. By better I mean no bullshit. No lying to the artists about album release dates or the budgets of videos and albums.

=== Astroworld Festival ===
Following the release of Astroworld, Scott announced the Astroworld Festival, an annual festive concert that would take place across the street from the former site of Six Flags AstroWorld. The 2018 Astroworld Festival contained appearances from Post Malone, Lil Wayne, Young Thug, Rae Sremmurd, Gunna, Houston All Stars, Sheck Wes, Metro Boomin, Trippie Redd, Smokepurpp, Virgil Abloh, and Tommy Genesis.

=== Fashion ===
Scott was introduced to the creative side of the fashion industry due to his personal stylish pairings of high-end fashion and streetwear. This caught the early attention of brands like Been Trill, Diamond Supply Co., and A Bathing Ape. Travis's liking for camp designs made its way into his collaboration with Been Trill. It was a well-recognized label/DJ collective founded by Virgil Abloh, Matthew Williams, Heron Preston, and Justin Saunders.

In 2015, Scott's collaborated with A Bathing Ape (BAPE) and marked his first project with the popular streetwear brand. His collection with BAPE consists of three pieces: a shark hoodie, a long-sleeve tee, and a t-shirt. In addition, Scott added a touch of "La Flame" on the ape logo head to give it his signature appeal. Later in 2016, Diamond Supply Co., a California-based streetwear brand, collaborated with Scott to launch a clothing collection. The collection was designed by Scott. The Collab consisted of graphic tees, long-sleeve tees, hoodies, coach jackets, and dad hats. In 2017, The Houston Rockets officially announced a collaboration with Travis Scott for Game 6 of the Western Conference Semifinals vs. San Antonio on Thursday, May 11. All fans in attendance at Toyota Center received a t-shirt personally designed by Travis Scott, featuring the Rockets playoff slogan, "Run as One", in his handwriting, along with call outs to the artist.

On April 30, 2019, Scott announced a collaboration with Nike to release his Cactus Jack Air Jordan 1's in May that year. In 2020, Scott partnered with Evisu, a Japanese denim brand founded by Hidehiko Yamane in 1991. On June 24, 2021, Scott announced a collaboration with Dior for a menswear collection that released in 2021. A live stream showcasing the collection was released on June 25. The live stream also showcased snippets of songs from his upcoming fourth studio album Utopia featuring a song with Westside Gunn and instrumentals from the album. In later 2022, Scott and Skepta, a British grime MC, rapper, and record producer, headlined an event hosted by Virgil Abloh Securities. The one-day music festival was held at the FPL Solar Amphitheater in Miami, Florida, U.S. The event took place to honor the late Virgil Abloh's legacy called Mirror Mirror. Since then, Scott has partnered both creatively and as the face of several clothing lines for luxury fashion houses like Helmut Lang and Saint Laurent.

In 2023, Scott collaborated with Audemars Piguet on a limited edition “Cactus Jack” model of the Royal Oak watch inspired by his album Utopia. Launch events for the collaboration were held in New York. In May 2024, Scott released his first sneaker collaboration with Jordan Brand, the CJ-1 T-Rexx, also known as the Jumpman Jack, which sold out instantly online. In 2024, Scott also previewed the Jumpman Jack “Sail/Mocha,” another sneaker collaboration with Jordan Brand, during his performance at the 66th Annual Grammy Awards. In May 2025, Scott collaborated with Spotify and FC Barcelona to release a special Cactus Jack-branded edition of the club’s kit for El Clásico, as well as several activations to promote the event.

=== Nike partnership ===
His partnership with Nike has produced coveted sneakers in recent years, including the “T-Rexx Jumpman Jack,” which debuted during his Grammy performance in 2024. Scott's Nike collaborations are listed below.

- Jordan Trunner LX, launched in 2017
- Nike Air Force 1, launched in 2017
- Air Jordan 4 "Cactus Jack", launched in 2018
- Air Jordan 4 "Purple Suede", launched in 2018
- Air Jordan 4 "Olive", launched in 2018
- Nike Air Force 1 "Sail," launched in 2018
- Air Jordan 1, launched in 2019
- Air Jordan 1 Low "Grammy", launched in 2019
- Air Jordan 33, launched in 2019
- Air Jordan 6, launched in 2019
- Air Jordan 1 Low, launched in 2019
- Nike Air Force 1, launched in 2019
- Nike SB Dunk Low, launched in 2020
- Nike Air Max 270 React ENG, launched in 2020
- Air Jordan 6 "British Khaki", launched in 2021
- Air Jordan 1 High OG x Fragment, launched on June 29, 2021
- Air Jordan 1 Low OG x Fragment, launched on August 13, 2021
- Air Jordan 1 High OG, launched in 2021
- Nike Air Max 1, launched in 2022
- Nike Air Trainer 1, launched in 2022
- Air Jordan 1 Low "Reverse Mocha", launched in 2022
- Air Jordan 1 Low “Black Phantom,” launched in 2022
- Air Jordan 1 Low Women’s “Olive,” launched in 2023
- Nike Air Force 1 Low “Utopia,” launched in 2023
- Air Jordan 1 Low Golf “Neutral Olive,” launched in 2023
- Nike Mac Attack, launched in 2023
- Jordan Jumpman Jack “Sail/Mocha,” first on-foot at 2024 Grammys; retail 2024
- Jordan Jumpman Jack “University Red,” launched in 2024
- Jordan Jumpman Jack “Dark Mocha,” launched in 2024
- Air Jordan 1 Low, “Velvet Brown,” launched in 2024
- Nike Zoom Field Jaxx, “Light Chocolate,” launched in 2025
- Jordan Jumpman Jack, “Bright Cactus,” launched in 2025
- Nike Zoom Field Jaxx, “Leche Blue,” launched in 2025
- Air Jordan 1 Low x Fragment, launched in 2025
- Air Jordan 1 Low "Tropical Pink", launched in 2026
- Air Jordan 1 Low "Shy Pink", launched in 2026

=== Other sneaker collaborations ===
- Helmut Lang, launched in 2017
- Dior B713, launched in 2022

=== Fortnite collaboration ===
In April 2020, Scott collaborated with Epic Games to perform a virtual concert inside Fortnite, titled "Astronomical", alongside the introduction of a Travis Scott outfit and cosmetic set available for purchase in the game's item shop. The event, which occurred from April 23–25, drew over 27 million unique participants across five shows, setting a new attendance record for Fortnite events. Epic Games also launched Travis Scott themed-Fortnite merchandise including clothing, action figures, and Nerf guns. Epic distanced themselves from Scott following the Astroworld crowd crush in 2021, pulling an emote featuring his song "Out West" from sale; the Travis Scott cosmetic set has not been available since its initial run in 2020. Scott's music would be used in Fortnite again in November 2024, with his verse on Ice Spice's "Oh Shhh..." being featured in the event, Remix: The Finale.

=== McDonald's ===
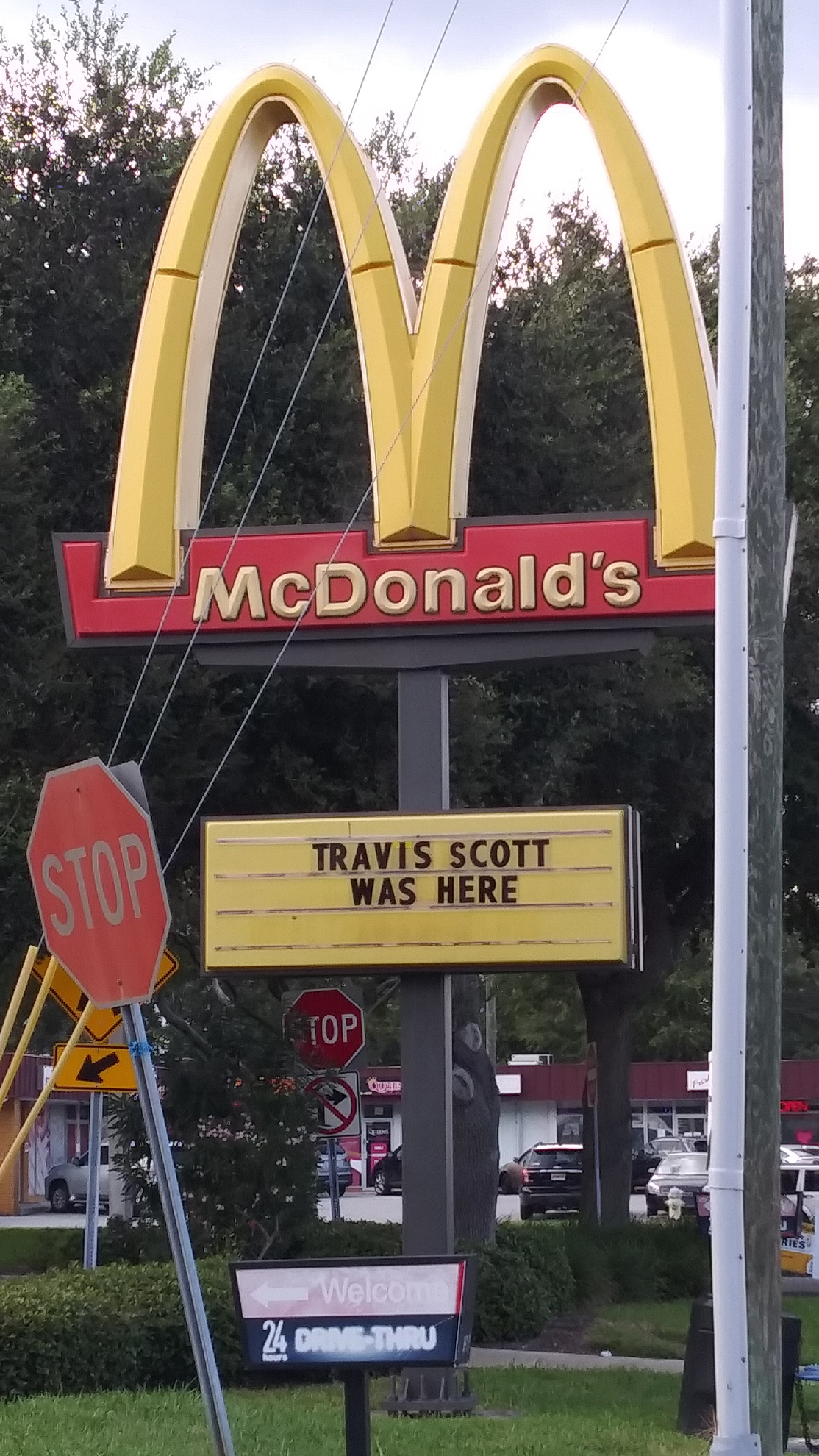
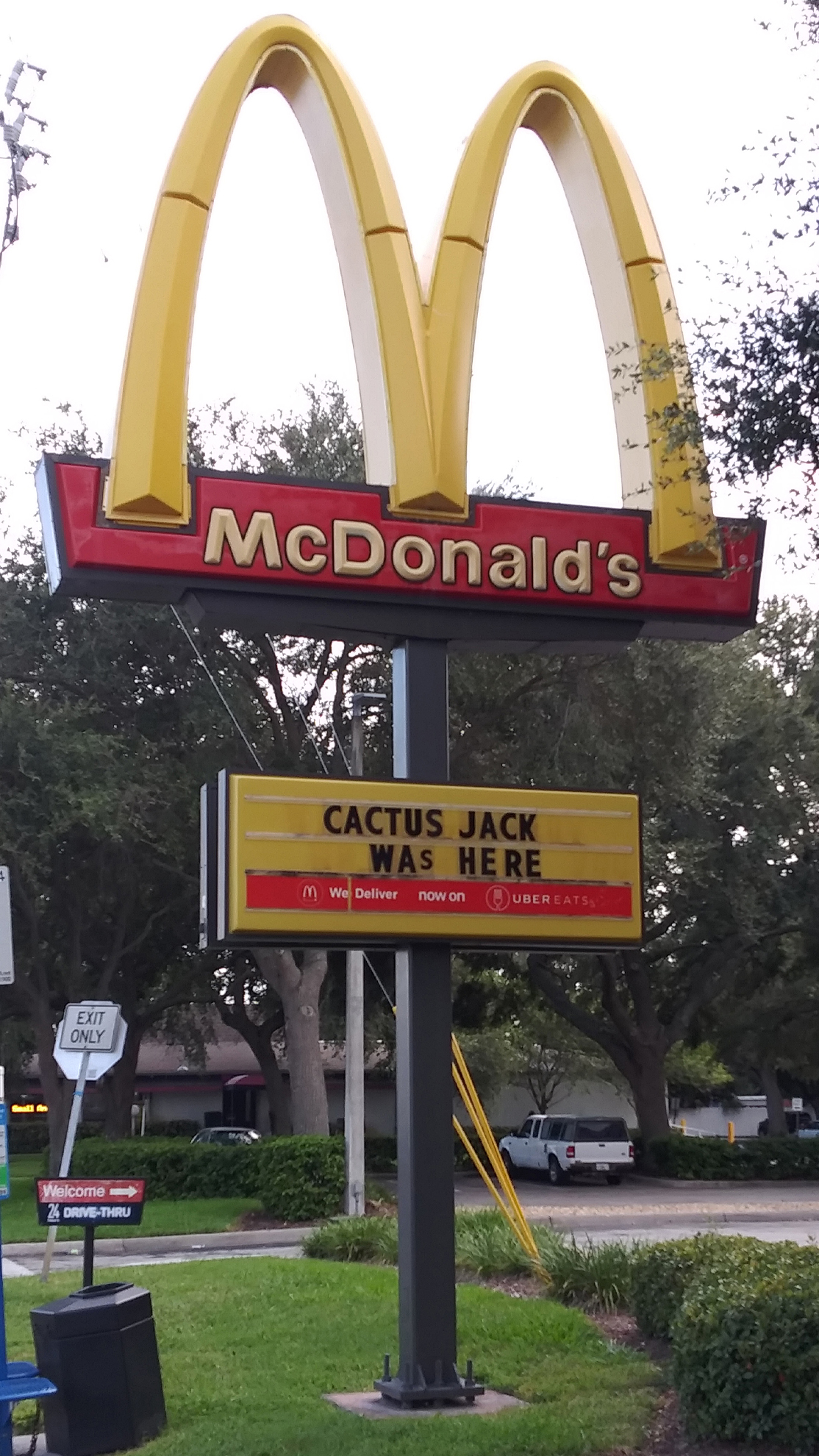
A McDonald's sign reading "Travis Scott was here" and "Cactus Jack was here" in St. Petersburg, Florida

In September 2020, Scott collaborated with McDonald's to launch a limited edition meal that was introduced in participating McDonald's restaurants in North America, named "The Travis Scott" and a variation on their Quarter Pounder with Cheese. The partnership marked the first nationally distributed celebrity-endorsed McDonald's meal in the chain's history, and the first celebrity meal since 1992, when McDonald's launched a "McJordan" burger with Michael Jordan in the Chicago metropolitan area. Due to high demand, some McDonald's branches ran out of ingredients tied to the promotion, causing a break in the supply chain. Scott and McDonald's also launched a line of McDonald's and Cactus Jack–branded merchandise, including a number of clothing items, a rug, and a McNugget-shaped body pillow. This popularized the celebrity meal craze, which would later be done similarly by BTS and Saweetie. The idea was exported to Europe in the fall of 2021, with Spanish singer Aitana serving as the first European act to have their own McDonald's meal.

=== PlayStation ===
In October 2020, Scott announced he was joining the PlayStation team as a Strategic Creative Partner to promote the PlayStation 5 console. Together, they released special merchandise, which includes a previously unseen version of Nike Dunk Lows. They also uploaded a special unboxing video of the PlayStation 5 console to YouTube. The video features footage of Scott playing the console alongside fans, a piano performance by James Blake, and a tribute to Pop Smoke.

=== The Scotts ===
Aside from his solo musical career, Scott is also one-half of the alternative hip-hop super-duo the Scotts, alongside his mentor and frequent collaborator, American musician Kid Cudi. They have currently been working on their debut collaborative effort since 2020, when the duo released the Billboard Hot 100 number one single, "The Scotts". In December 2022, Cudi revealed they were no longer working on the album, effectively announcing its cancellation. However in July 2023, Cudi stated the album "is [definitely] happening at some point."

=== Film industry ===
Scott made his theatrical debut in the 2021 film Gully as a movie store owner. He also contributed to the film's soundtrack but his song "Knife" was cut due to sampling issues, but was still featured briefly in the film. On August 2, 2021, Scott signed a movie production deal with A24. The same day he announced the completion of a draft for a film based on his then-upcoming fourth studio album Utopia, which would later be revealed to be Circus Maximus.

=== Professional wrestling ===
Scott started making appearances for American professional wrestling promotion WWE in 2025. He would make his professional wrestling debut on January 6, 2025, where Scott appeared in-person at WWE Raw's premiere on Netflix, in which his song's title, "4x4", was revealed and was confirmed to serve as the program's opening theme. He would escort professional wrestler Jey Uso to the ring before his match. Scott would appear at the Elimination Chamber: Toronto event on March 1, 2025, where he accompanied Dwayne "The Rock" Johnson to the ring ahead of Rock's segment with then Cody Rhodes (the then Undisputed WWE Champion). When John Cena betrayed Rhodes during the segment, Scott assisted Rock and Cena in attacking Rhodes, establishing himself as a villain for the first time since 2003. From the same segment, it was reported that Scott injured Cody when he attacked him by throwing an improper punch to the side of Cody's face, causing a "busted eardrum and a black eye". Scott would appear at WrestleMania 41 Night 2 on April 20, 2025, where he walked out to his song "Fein" (one of the official theme songs of the event), and interfered in the main event between Rhodes and Cena. He would be taken out with a Cross Rhodes by Rhodes. It was reported that Scott would make his in-ring debut in a tag team match teaming up with Cena against Rhodes and another celebrity; however, those plans were scrapped as it was reported that Scott and WWE had a "falling out". This would lead to his removal as a surprise celebrity DLC character for the video game WWE 2K25. It was also reported that the reason WWE had featured Travis Scott so heavily was that Ari Emanuel, the chief executive officer (CEO) of WWE's parent company TKO, promised Scott the spot as a "favor", and that WWE saw Scott as "lazy" and was "difficult to work with".

=== CactusCon and other branded events ===
In November 2024, Scott hosted CactusCon, a multi‑day activation featuring performances, installations and limited‑edition merchandise, as part of Comp lexCon 2024 in Las Vegas. Scott performed on stage to close out the event.

== Artistry ==
=== Influences ===
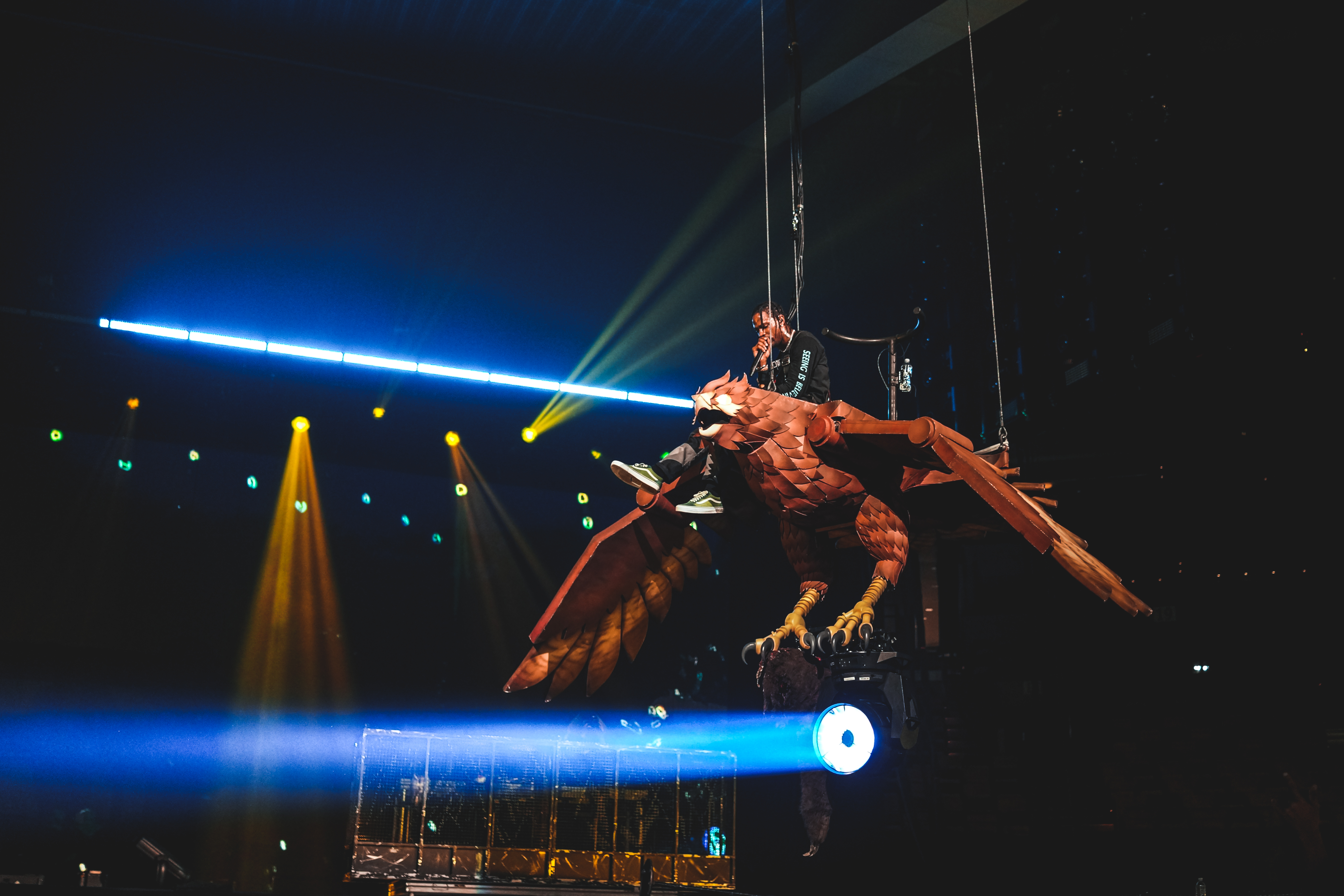
Scott performing in 2017

Scott has stated that Björk is "one of my biggest inspirations for why I do what I do". He is also influenced by Bon Iver, Kid Cudi, M.I.A., Kanye West, Toro y Moi, Tame Impala, T.I., and Thom Yorke.

=== Musical style ===
Scott makes heavy use of audio manipulation effects such as Auto-Tune, phasing, delays, and stereo-sculpted chorusing and harmony structures, predominantly influenced by producers Mike Dean and Alex Tumay. Scott's musical style has been characterized as "ambient"; Scott himself has said "I'm not hip-hop". Vulture described Scott's sound as "unremittingly dark, syncretic, hi-res, and above all unnatural". Scott's musical style has been described as being hip-hop, "psychedelic" trap, and pop rap. Spin magazine compared his debut mixtape Owl Pharaoh (2013) to fellow American rapper Kid Cudi's Man on the Moon II: The Legend of Mr. Rager (2010).

== Creative vision ==
In 2016, Harmony Korine, an American filmmaker, teamed with Scott and fellow American rapper Gucci Mane to release a collaborative music video for their collaboration "Last Time"; Korine made a cameo appearance in the short directed by David Helman. In 2018, Scott has said that he is a fan of Broadway theatre and would like to do an album of show tune covers. He has said that he would like to write his own musical in the future.

In 2021, Scott starred in a cover story of i-D Magazine Issue 362 "Utopia in Dystopia" photographed by Spike Jonze. Scott graced two covers for the issue, including a limited-edition cover featuring original artwork by Jonze. Scott teamed up with i-D Magazine for a limited edition merch capsule release. Scott added his original signature artwork to the special edition issue of the magazine. His classic scrawled artwork also makes an appearance on the Travis Scott X i-D collaborative merch. Scott has also collaborated with the photographer David LaChappelle. Scott's album Astroworld's cover art was reportedly shot by LaChappelle. The artwork featured a large golden replica of Scott's head.

== Philanthropy ==
=== Cactus Jack Foundation ===
Scott established the Cactus Jack Foundation in November 2020 to assist Houston youth with education expenses and creative endeavors. In December 2021, the foundation gave out thousands of toys to the children of Houston. On May 17, 2022, Scott announced that he would give away $1 million in scholarships to 100 HBCU college students from the graduating class of 2022 through the Cactus Jack Foundation.

=== Project Heal ===
In 2022, Scott launched a multi-tier, long-term series of community-focused philanthropy and investment efforts called Project HEAL through his Cactus Jack Foundation. The philanthropic effort provided $5 million for community-based initiatives in Scott's home state of Texas. Project HEAL is a multi-tier initiative dedicated to addressing challenges facing today's youth, especially those from marginalized and at-risk communities.

== Personal life ==
Scott began dating media personality and businesswoman Kylie Jenner in April 2017. In February 2018, Jenner gave birth to their daughter. Jenner appeared in the music video for "Stop Trying to Be God", from Scott's third studio album Astroworld. They broke up in September 2019, but quarantined together during the COVID-19 pandemic for the sake of their daughter and ended up rekindling their relationship. On September 7, 2021, after weeks of speculation, Jenner revealed that she and Scott were expecting their second child. Jenner gave birth to their son in February 2022. The couple separated for a second time by January 2023.

== Legal issues ==
=== Incidents at performances ===
Scott's performances have experienced a number of issues. At Lollapalooza in 2015, Scott was charged and arrested for disorderly conduct after inciting concertgoers to ignore security and rush the stage. For this, he would later plead guilty to reckless conduct and receive one year of supervised release. That same year, at the Openair Festival in Switzerland, he encouraged fans to attack a man who took his shoe while he was crowd-surfing, by stopping the concert and repeatedly telling the crowd to "fuck him up", while also spitting on him.

In 2017, Scott was arrested for similar conduct to his Lollapalooza behavior after a performance at the Walmart Arkansas Music Pavilion, in Northwest Arkansas. That same year, a fan sued Scott and the organizers of a 2017 concert at Terminal 5 in Manhattan after falling from a balcony and being dragged on stage, blaming the fall on a crowd surge. In 2019, three people were trampled and injured as a crowd rushed to enter the compound at Astroworld.

==== Astroworld Festival crowd crush ====
On November 5, 2021, at least ten people died and hundreds were injured in a crowd crush moving toward the stage during Scott's performance at the Astroworld Festival in NRG Park in his hometown of Houston, Texas. On the first night, a crowd crush occurred, resulting in the cancellation of the second night of the festival. In video footage of the incident, Scott is seen continuing to perform despite chants from the crowd pleading for him to stop; observing at least one audience member had been hurt, then ordering security for a brief moment to "help, jump in real quick, keep going", only to continue with the rest of the show for the following hour; encouraging people to "get wild" and "crazy", despite an ambulance passing through the crowd that was pulling out lifeless bodies. Victims killed ranged from 9 to 27 years old.

Shortly after, a lawsuit was announced by the concertgoers. It was started by Kristian Paredes, who filed for $1,000,000 due to the injuries he received. On June 29, 2023, a Texas grand jury declined to indict Scott in a criminal probe of the crowd surge.

==== Nebula assault allegations ====
On March 1, 2023, Scott was performing at Nebula, a nightclub in New York City, alongside Don Toliver when a sound technician, identified only as Mark, asked Scott to lower the music as it was too loud for the venue's size. Scott reportedly responded by giving Mark the middle finger and punching him in the head, resulting in Mark needing medical attention and police being called to the scene around 3:25 a.m. Scott had reportedly been drinking alcohol and damaged $12,000 worth of sound equipment in the club before he left the premises. The New York City Police Department (NYPD) issued a warrant for Scott's arrest in relation to the incident on March 2, 2023. The matter was resolved with a settlement reached and the NYPD not pressing any charges.

=== Miami Beach arrest ===
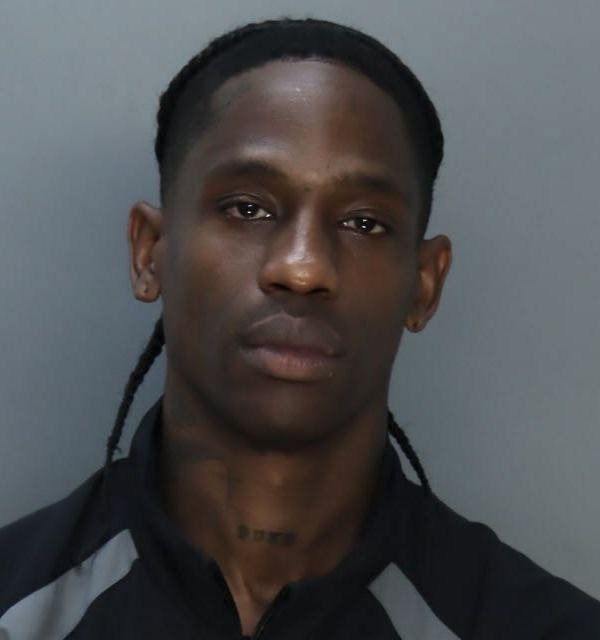
Scott's mugshot on June 20, 2024, in Miami

In the early hours of June 20, 2024, Scott was arrested in Miami Beach on charges of disorderly intoxication and trespassing property after warning. He was released over six hours later after posting a $650 bond. The same day, Scott would capitalize on this incident by unleashing merchandise containing his mugshot which was taken following the arrest. In August, prosecutors dropped Scott's disorderly intoxication charge whilst continuing to press charges for trespassing after warning.

=== Paris arrest ===
In the early hours of August 9, 2024, Scott was arrested in Paris after allegedly getting into a fight with his bodyguard. A security guard at the luxury George V hotel where Scott was staying at intervened, which prompted Scott to attack the security guard as well. Scott was released without charges the following day.

== Discography ==
Studio albums

- Rodeo (2015)
- Birds in the Trap Sing McKnight (2016)
- Astroworld (2018)
- Utopia (2023)

Collaborative albums

- Huncho Jack, Jack Huncho (with Quavo as Huncho Jack) (2017)

Compilation albums

- JackBoys (with Cactus Jack Records) (2019)
- JackBoys 2 (with Cactus Jack Records) (2025)

== Filmography ==
Year	Film	Role	Notes	Ref.
2019	Travis Scott: Look Mom I Can Fly	Himself	Documentary	
2019	Gully	Store owner	Minor role	
2021	Trolls: Holiday in Harmony	Rhyme-a-saurus (voice)	Television special	
2023	Circus Maximus	Himself	Film adaptation of Utopia.	
2023	Aggro Dr1ft	Zion		
2026	The Odyssey	Bard	Cameo	
2026	Rolling Loud: The Movie	Himself		

== Awards and nominations ==
Awards	Year	Category	Nominated work	Result	Ref.
American Music Awards	2019	Favorite Album – Rap/Hip-Hop	Astroworld	Nominated	
American Music Awards	2019	Favorite Song – Rap/Hip-Hop	"Sicko Mode" (with Drake)	Nominated	
ARIA Music Awards	2019	Best International Artist	Astroworld	Nominated	
ARIA Music Awards	2024	Best International Artist	Utopia	Nominated	
BET Awards	2018	Viewers' Choice Award	"Love Galore" (with SZA)	Nominated	
BET Awards	2019	Best Male Hip Hop Artist	Himself	Nominated	
BET Awards	2019	Album of the Year	Astroworld	Nominated	
BET Awards	2019	Best Collaboration	"Sicko Mode" (with Drake)	Won	
BET Awards	2019	Coca-Cola Viewers' Choice Award	"Sicko Mode" (with Drake)	Nominated	
BET Awards	2020	Best Male Hip Hop Artist	Himself	Nominated	
BET Awards	2025	Video of the Year	"Type Shit" (with Future, Metro Boomin & Playboi Carti)	Nominated	
Berlin Music Video Awards	2019	Best VFX	"Sicko Mode" (with Drake)	Nominated	
Berlin Music Video Awards	2020	Best VFX	"Highest in the Room"	Nominated	
Berlin Music Video Awards	2021	Best Director	"TKN" (with Rosalía)	Nominated	
Berlin Music Video Awards	2025	Best Editor	"FE!N"	Nominated	
Berlin Music Video Awards	2026	Best Cinematography	"Drugs You Should Try It"	Nominated	
BET Hip Hop Awards	2013	Best Mixtape	Owl Pharaoh	Nominated	
BET Hip Hop Awards	2015	Best Mixtape	Days Before Rodeo	Nominated	
BET Hip Hop Awards	2016	People's Champ Award	"Antidote"	Won	
BET Hip Hop Awards	2018	Hot Ticket Performer	Himself	Nominated	
BET Hip Hop Awards	2018	Lyricist of the Year	Himself	Nominated	
BET Hip Hop Awards	2018	MVP of the Year	Himself	Nominated	
BET Hip Hop Awards	2018	Hustler of the Year	Himself	Nominated	
BET Hip Hop Awards	2018	Made-You-Look Award (Best Hip Hop Style)	Himself	Nominated	
BET Hip Hop Awards	2019	Hot Ticket Performer	Himself	Nominated	
BET Hip Hop Awards	2019	Video Director of the Year	Himself	Won	
BET Hip Hop Awards	2019	Hustler of the Year	Himself	Nominated	
BET Hip Hop Awards	2019	Best Hip Hop Style	Himself	Nominated	
BET Hip Hop Awards	2019	Album of the Year	Astroworld	Won	
BET Hip Hop Awards	2019	Best Hip Hop Video	"Sicko Mode" (with Drake)	Nominated	
BET Hip Hop Awards	2019	Best Collabo, Duo or Group	"Sicko Mode" (with Drake)	Nominated	
BET Hip Hop Awards	2020	Best Live Performer	Himself	Won	
BET Hip Hop Awards	2020	Hustler of the Year	Himself	Nominated	
BET Hip Hop Awards	2020	Sweet 16: Best Featured Verse	"Hot (Remix)" (with Young Thug & Gunna)	Nominated	
BET Hip Hop Awards	2023	Video Director of the Year	Himself	Nominated	
BET Hip Hop Awards	2024	I Am Hip Hop Award	Himself	Honoree	
BET Hip Hop Awards	2024	Best Live Performer	Himself	Nominated	
BET Hip Hop Awards	2024	Video Director of the Year	Himself	Nominated	
BET Hip Hop Awards	2024	Song of the Year	"Fein" (with Playboi Carti)	Nominated	
BET Hip Hop Awards	2024	Album of the Year	Utopia	Nominated	
BET Hip Hop Awards	2024	Best Hip Hop Video	"Type Shit" (with Future, Metro Boomin & Playboi Carti)	Nominated	
BET Hip Hop Awards	2024	Best Collaboration	"At the Party" (with Kid Cudi & Pharrell Williams)	Nominated	
Billboard Music Awards	2019	Top Artist	Himself	Nominated	
Billboard Music Awards	2019	Top Male Artist	Himself	Nominated	
Billboard Music Awards	2019	Top Billboard 200 Artist	Himself	Nominated	
Billboard Music Awards	2019	Top Rap Artist	Himself	Nominated	
Billboard Music Awards	2019	Top Rap Male Artist	Himself	Nominated	
Billboard Music Awards	2019	Top Rap Tour	Himself	Nominated	
Billboard Music Awards	2019	Top Billboard 200 Album	Astroworld	Nominated	
Billboard Music Awards	2019	Top Rap Album	Astroworld	Nominated	
Billboard Music Awards	2019	Top Hot 100 Song	"Sicko Mode" (with Drake)	Nominated	
Billboard Music Awards	2019	Top Streaming Song (Audio)	"Sicko Mode" (with Drake)	Won	
Billboard Music Awards	2019	Top Streaming Song (Video)	"Sicko Mode" (with Drake)	Nominated	
Billboard Music Awards	2019	Top Rap Song	"Sicko Mode" (with Drake)	Nominated	
Billboard Music Awards	2020	Top Streaming Songs Artist	Himself	Nominated	
Billboard Music Awards	2020	Top Rap Tour	Himself	Nominated	
Billboard Music Awards	2021	Top Gospel Song	"Wash Us in the Blood" (with Kanye West)	Won	
Billboard Music Awards	2022	Top Dance/Electronic Song	"Goosebumps" (with HVME)	Nominated	
Billboard Music Awards	2023	Top Rap Artist	Himself	Nominated	
Billboard Music Awards	2023	Top Rap Male Artist	Himself	Nominated	
Billboard Music Awards	2023	Top Rap Album	Utopia	Nominated	
Billboard Music Awards	2024	Top Rap Artist	Himself	Nominated	
Billboard Music Awards	2024	Top Rap Male Artist	Himself	Nominated	
Billboard Music Awards	2024	Top Rap Touring Artist	Himself	Won	
Brit Awards	2019	International Male Solo Artist	Himself	Nominated	
Global Awards	2019	Best RnB, Hip Hop or Grime	Himself	Nominated	
Grammy Awards	2014	Best Rap Song	"New Slaves" (as producer)	Nominated	
Grammy Awards	2017	Album of the Year	Purpose (as featured artist)	Nominated	
Grammy Awards	2018	Best Rap/Sung Performance	"Love Galore" (with SZA)	Nominated	
Grammy Awards	2019	Best Rap Performance	"Sicko Mode" (with Drake)	Nominated	
Grammy Awards	2019	Best Rap Song	"Sicko Mode" (with Drake)	Nominated	
Grammy Awards	2019	Best Rap Album	Astroworld	Nominated	
Grammy Awards	2020	Best Rap/Sung Performance	"The London" (with Young Thug and J. Cole)	Nominated	
Grammy Awards	2021	Best Melodic Rap Performance	"Highest in the Room"	Nominated	
Grammy Awards	2022	Album of the Year	Donda (as featured artist and songwriter)	Nominated	
Grammy Awards	2024	Best Rap Album	Utopia	Nominated	
Hollywood Music in Media Awards	2026	Original Song – Feature Film	"When I'm Home" (with James Blake & Ludwig Göransson)	Nominated	
Hollywood Music in Media Awards	2026	Music Video	"When I'm Home"	Nominated	
IHeartRadio Music Awards	2019	Hip-Hop Artist of the Year	Himself	Nominated	
IHeartRadio Music Awards	2019	R&B Song of the Year	"Sky Walker" (with Miguel)	Nominated	
IHeartRadio Music Awards	2020	Hip-Hop Artist of the Year	Himself	Nominated	
IHeartRadio Music Awards	2025	Hip-Hop Artist of the Year	Himself	Nominated	
IHeartRadio Music Awards	2025	Favorite Tour Photographer	Himself	Nominated	
IHeartRadio Music Awards	2025	Favorite Surprise Guest	Himself	Nominated	
iHeartRadio Titanium Award	2020	1 Billion Total Audience Spins on iHeartRadio Stations	"Sicko Mode" (with Drake)	Won	
Juno Awards	2019	International Album of the Year	Astroworld	Nominated	
Latin Grammy Awards	2020	Best Short Form Music Video	"TKN" (with Rosalía)	Won	
LOS40 Music Awards	2020	Best Latin Music Video	"TKN" (with Rosalía)	Nominated	
LOS40 Music Awards	2024	Best International Live Act	Himself	Nominated	
MOBO Awards	2016	Best International Act	Himself	Nominated	
MOBO Awards	2023	Best International Act	Himself	Nominated	
MTV Europe Music Awards	2015	Artist on the Rise	Himself	Nominated	
MTV Europe Music Awards	2018	Best Hip-Hop	Himself	Nominated	
MTV Europe Music Awards	2019	Best Live	Himself	Nominated	
MTV Europe Music Awards	2019	Best Hip-Hop	Himself	Nominated	
MTV Europe Music Awards	2020	Best Hip-Hop	Himself	Nominated	
MTV Europe Music Awards	2023	Best Hip-Hop	Himself	Nominated	
MTV Europe Music Awards	2024	Best Hip-Hop	Himself	Nominated	
MTV Europe Music Awards	2024	Best Live	Himself	Nominated	
MTV Video Music Awards	2019	Best Hip Hop	"Sicko Mode" (with Drake)	Nominated	
MTV Video Music Awards	2019	Song of Summer	"The London" (with Young Thug and J. Cole)	Nominated	
MTV Video Music Awards	2020	Best Hip Hop	"Highest in the Room"	Nominated	
MTV Video Music Awards	2020	Best Visual Effects	"Highest in the Room"	Nominated	
MTV Video Music Awards	2021	Best Hip Hop	"Franchise" (with Young Thug and M.I.A.)	Won	
MTV Video Music Awards	2021	Best Direction	"Franchise" (with Young Thug and M.I.A.)	Nominated	
MTV Video Music Awards	2024	Best Hip Hop	"Fein" (with Playboi Carti)	Nominated	
MTV Video Music Awards	2025	Best Afrobeats	"Active" (with Asake)	Nominated	
MTV Video Music Awards	2025	Best Afrobeats	"TaTaTa" (with Burna Boy)	Nominated	
MTV Video Music Awards	2025	Best Hip Hop	"4x4"	Nominated	
MTV Video Music Awards	2026	Best Hip Hop	"Dumbo"	Nominated	
NAACP Image Awards	2018	Outstanding Duo, Group or Collaboration	"Love Galore" (with SZA)	Nominated	
NAACP Image Awards	2018	Outstanding Song, Contemporary	"Love Galore" (with SZA)	Nominated	
Nickelodeon Kids' Choice Awards	2019	Favorite Collaboration	"Sicko Mode" (with Drake)	Nominated	
Nickelodeon Kids' Choice Awards	2024	Favorite Male Artist	Himself	Nominated	
Nickelodeon Kids' Choice Awards	2025	Favorite Male Artist	Himself	Nominated	
People's Choice Awards	2018	Song of the Year	"Butterfly Effect"	Nominated	
People's Choice Awards	2018	Album of the Year	Astroworld	Nominated	
People's Choice Awards	2019	The Male Artist of 2019	Himself	Nominated	
People's Choice Awards	2024	The Hip-Hop Artist of the Year	Himself	Nominated	
Premios Juventud	2021	OMG Collaboration	"TKN" (with Rosalía)	Nominated	
Premios Juventud	2024	OMG Collaboration	"K-Pop" (with Bad Bunny & The Weeknd)	Nominated	
Premio Lo Nuestro	2021	Video of the Year	"TKN" (with Rosalía)	Won	
Premio Lo Nuestro	2021	Crossover Collaboration of the Year	"TKN" (with Rosalía)	Nominated	
Soul Train Music Awards	2017	Best Collaboration	"Love Galore" (with SZA)	Nominated	
South African Music Awards	2024	Best Collaboration	"Water" (with Tyla)	Nominated	
The Headies	2024	International Artiste of the Year	"Active" (with Asake)	Won	
Teen Choice Awards	2017	Choice Electronic/Dance Song	"Know No Better" (with Major Lazer, Camila Cabello and Quavo)	Nominated	
Teen Choice Awards	2019	Choice R&B/Hip-Hop Artist	Himself	Nominated	
Teen Choice Awards	2019	Choice Song: Male Artist	"Sicko Mode" (with Drake)	Nominated	
UK Music Video Awards	2019	Best Pop Video - UK	"Antisocial" (with Ed Sheeran)	Nominated	
UK Music Video Awards	2020	Best Pop Video - International	"TKN" (with Rosalía)	Nominated	
UK Music Video Awards	2021	Best Hip Hop/Grime/Rap Video - International	"Franchise" (with Young Thug and M.I.A.)	Nominated	
UK Music Video Awards	2023	Best Hip Hop/Grime/Rap Video - International	"Sirens"	Nominated	
UK Music Video Awards	2024	Best Hip Hop/Grime/Rap Video - International	"Fein" (with Playboi Carti)	Nominated	
UK Music Video Awards	2025	Best Hip Hop/Grime/Rap Video - International	"4x4"	Nominated	
UK Music Video Awards	2025	Best Cinematography in a Video	"4x4"	Nominated	
UK Music Video Awards	2025	Best Cinematography in a Video	"Drugs You Should Try It"	Nominated	

== Tours ==
Headlining

- Rodeo Tour (2015)
- Birds Eye View Tour (2017)
- Astroworld: Wish You Were Here Tour (2018–2019)
- Astroworld Festival (also known as Astrofest) (2018–2019, 2021)
- Circus Maximus Tour (2023–2025)

Supporting

- The Yeezus Tour (with Kanye West and Kendrick Lamar) (2013)
- Never Sober Tour (with Juicy J and Project Pat) (2015)
- The Madness Fall Tour (with The Weeknd and Banks) (2015)
- Anti World Tour (with Rihanna) (2016)
- The Damn. Tour (with Kendrick Lamar and DRAM) (2017)
