= Owl Pharaoh =

Mixtape by Travis Scott
- Released: May 21, 2013
- Recorded: 2012–2013
- Length: 51:34
- Label: Grand Hustle
- Producers: Anthony Kilhoffer; DJ Dahi; Emile Haynie; J Gramm Beats; Lex Luger; Mike Dean; Rahki; Rey Reel; Sak Pase; The Dope Boys; Toro y Moi; Travis Scott; WondaGurl; Young Chop

Travis Scott chronology
Owl Pharaoh (2013)	Days Before Rodeo (2014)

Singles from Owl Pharaoh
- 1. "Upper Echelon" Released: April 18, 2013

Owl Pharaoh is the debut mixtape by American rapper Travis Scott. It was released through Grand Hustle Records and Epic Records on May 21, 2013. The mixtape features guest appearances from T.I., Toro y Moi, ASAP Ferg, Theophilus London, Paul Wall, James Fauntleroy, Wale, and Meek Mill. Production was handled by Scott and Toro y Moi themselves, Emile Haynie, J Gramm Beats, Anthony Kilhoffer, WondaGurl, DJ Dahi, Rey Reel, Rahki, Mike Dean, Young Chop, Lex Luger, Sak Pase, and the Dope Boys. The mixtape was supported by one single, "Upper Echelon", which features T.I. and was released with an exclusive additional feature from 2 Chainz that does not appear on the version of the song on the mixtape on April 18, 2013.

== Background and promotion ==
In 2011, Scott announced that his then-upcoming first project would be titled Owl Pharaoh and would be an 11-track extended play with two bonus tracks instead of a mixtape, which would include some of his older songs such as "Lights (Love Sick)", "Analogue", and "That B!tch Crazy". The following year, he worked more on the project to make it a mixtape and announced that it would be released the same month as GOOD Music's Cruel Summer, which did not end up happening for unknown reasons. Scott released the song "Blocka La Flame" along with the official music video on December 14, 2012. He then worked even more on the project and set a new release date for February 22, 2013, which also did not end up happening for unknown reasons. On March 22, 2013, Scott released a solo version of the song "Quintana" alongside its accompanying visuals before fellow American rapper Wale was added to the song when the mixtape was released. After gaining some moderate popularity from being listed in XXL's Freshman Class of 2013, he announced that the mixtape would be released on May 21, 2013, and said that he may release it on iTunes but did not end up releasing it to any other streaming services other than his SoundCloud account due to him not being able to clear all the samples on it. On April 18, 2013, Scott released the lead and only single of the mixtape, "Upper Echelon", which features fellow American rappers T.I. and 2 Chainz, but the latter is only featured on the single version of the song and not the one that appears on the mixtape. He also credited T.I., Kanye West, and Justin Vernon for helping him create the project. Four days later, he revealed the tracklist of the mixtape, which included songs that feature Common and Gunplay that did not end up appearing on it. MTV revealed that Scott would be releasing the mixtape for free and not on iTunes.

== Critical reception ==
Professional ratings
Review scores
Source	Rating
XXL	(XL)

Owl Pharaoh was met with critical acclaim from music critics. Ralph Bristout of XXL gave the album an XL, saying "While he’s still finding himself lyrically, his work behind the boards and eagerness to try new things keep this from becoming problematic. Perhaps Owl Pharaoh’s sole drawback is that it still doesn’t quite seem to answer the question 'Who exactly is Travi$ Scott?' Luckily for him, this incredibly cohesive debut is so mesmerizing that everyone should want to find out." The mixtape was nominated for Best Mixtape at the 2013 BET Hip Hop Awards. Spin ranked it at number 21, on their list of the "40 Best Hip-Hop Albums of 2013." They commented saying, "The sneering attitude dripping through muffled Auto-Tune and dark streaks of "Uptown" and "Bad Mood / Shit On You" are a very distinct brand of dark and twisted, but certainly not a fantasy." XXL named it the fifth best mixtape of 2013. They elaborated saying, "Above all things, the 2013 XXL Freshman’s production skills is on full display, presenting his wide range of sound. Owl Pharaoh is an early sign that the potential for him is monumental."

== Accolades ==
Year	Ceremony	Award	Result
2013	BET Hip Hop Awards	"Best Mixtape"	Nominated

== Track listing ==
No.	Title	Writer(s)	Producer(s)	Length
1.	"Meadow Creek"	Jacques Webster II	Travis Scott	1:48
2.	"Bad Mood / Shit on You"	Webster; Emile Haynie; Julian Gramma	Travis Scott; Emile Haynie; J Gramm Beats	5:18
3.	"Upper Echelon" (featuring T.I.)	Webster; Clifford Harris, Jr.; Michael Dean; Anthony Kilhoffer; Gramma	Travis Scott; Kilhoffer; J Gramm Beats	2:52
4.	"Chaz Interlude" (featuring Toro y Moi)	Chazwick Bundick	Toro y Moi	1:40
5.	"Uptown" (featuring A$AP Ferg)	Webster; Darold Ferguson, Jr.; Ebony Oshunrinde	Travis Scott; WondaGurl	4:29
6.	"Hell of a Night"	Webster; James Fauntleroy II; Dacoury Natche; Raymond Martin; Columbus Smith III	Travis Scott; DJ Dahi; Rey Reel; Rahki	3:14
7.	"Blocka La Flame"	Webster; Dean; Tyree Pittman; Andrae Sutherland	Travis Scott; Dean; Young Chop	3:38
8.	"Naked"	Webster; Justin Vernon; Gramma	Travis Scott; J Gramm Beats	1:40
9.	"Dance on the Moon" (featuring Theophilus London and Paul Wall)	Webster; Theophilus London; Paul Slayden; Gramma	Travis Scott; J Gramm Beats	5:14
10.	"MIA"	Webster; Lexus Lewis	Travis Scott; Lex Luger	4:22
11.	"Drive" (featuring James Fauntleroy)	Webster; Fauntleroy	Travis Scott	5:14
12.	"Quintana" (featuring Wale)	Webster; Olubowale Akintimehin; Kilhoffer; Shama Joseph	Travis Scott; Kilhoffer; Sak Pase	5:07
13.	"16 Chapels" (Bonus Track)	Webster	Travis Scott	3:53
14.	"Bandz" (featuring Meek Mill)	Webster; Robert Williams; Dean	Travis Scott; Dean; The Dope Boys	4:31
Total length:				52:33

=== Notes ===
- "Blocka La Flame" features additional vocals from Popcaan
- "Naked" features additional vocals from Justin Vernon
- "Upper Echelon" on the mixtape cuts before the 2 Chainz feature, the full song was released as a single
- 16 Chapels was not present on the mixtape originally and was later added to the SoundCloud release of it
