= Days Before Rodeo =

Mixtape by Travis Scott
- Released: August 18, 2014
- Recorded: 2014 (Note: Tracks from the "digital vault" versions of Days Before Rodeo are not included in the recording timeframe, such as "Whoudini", which was originally recorded between 2017–2018.)
- Genres: Trap; alternative hip-hop
- Length: 47:39
- Label: Grand Hustle
- Producers: Allen Ritter; Anthony Kilhoffer; AudioKlique; Charlie Handsome; DJ Dahi; FKi 1st; J. Hill; Lex Luger; Lil' C; Metro Boomin; Mike Dean; OZ; Southside; Syk Sense; Tane Runo; Travis Scott; WondaGurl; Vinylz

Travis Scott chronology
Owl Pharaoh (2013)	Days Before Rodeo (2014)	Rodeo (2015)

Singles from Days Before Rodeo
- 1. "Don't Play" Released: May 5, 2014; 2. "Mamacita" Released: December 2, 2014; 3. "Drugs You Should Try It" Released: August 27, 2024

Days Before Rodeo (stylised in all caps) is the second mixtape by American rapper Travis Scott. It was released independently on SoundCloud on August 18, 2014. The mixtape features guest appearances from Rich Homie Quan, Young Thug, T.I., the 1975, Big Sean, Migos, and Peewee Longway. Production was handled by Scott himself, alongside Mike Dean, WondaGurl, Metro Boomin, DJ Dahi, Southside, Lil' C, AudioKlique, Charlie Handsome, FKi 1st, Vinylz, Allen Ritter, Anthony Kilhoffer, Lex Luger, Oz, Syk Sense, Tane Runo, and J. Hill. The mixtape serves as the follow-up to Scott's debut mixtape, Owl Pharaoh (2013), and serves as the prequel to his debut studio album, Rodeo (2015).

For its tenth anniversary, the mixtape was released through Cactus Jack and Epic Records on streaming services on August 23, 2024. A few digital vault editions of the mixtape were available exclusively on Scott's website for a short period of time and included ten additional songs in total that did not end up appearing on its original version. With all the vault editions being combined, they feature additional guest appearances from Quavo as a solo artist and Playboi Carti. Upon the re-release of the mixtape, it debuted at number two on the US Billboard 200, moving 361,000 album-equivalent units, of which 331,000 were pure album sales. In its fourth tracking week, it ascended to the top position on the chart, moving an additional 156,000 album-equivalent units, 149,000 of which were vinyl copies.

== Background and promotion ==
On July 11, 2014, Travis Scott released the lead single of the mixtape, "Don't Play", which features English pop rock band the 1975 and fellow American rapper Big Sean. Big Sean’s verse was rumored as Big Sean’s best verse of 2014. The following month, he took to social media to announce that he would be releasing 10 new songs within a month. On the same day, he also tweeted the title of the mixtape, before marketing the countdown every day until it stopped on August 10, 2014. Scott described it as a "free album" on social media although he made it clear that it is a mixtape. On August 17, 2014, he revealed the cover art, release date, and track listing of the mixtape. "Mamacita", which features fellow American rappers Rich Homie Quan and Young Thug, was released as the second and final single from the mixtape on December 2, 2014. Both singles were also released to streaming services the day they were released, unlike the other songs on the mixtape until over ten years later.

On August 17, 2024, Scott announced that Days Before Rodeo would finally be released to streaming services soon at the Fanatics Fest in New York City. The next day, which was the tenth anniversary of the mixtape, he took to social media to announce the re-release, where he also shared that the digital deluxe edition of the mixtape is exclusively on his website, which would include tracks that he recorded for it that did not end up appearing on it. On August 22, 2024, Scott performed a special sold-out concert for over one thousand people for the tenth anniversary of Days Before Rodeo at the Heaven stage at the Masquerade in Atlanta, Georgia, where he performed most of the songs from the mixtape along with some of his other songs. Five days later, "Drugs You Should Try It" was released as the third and final single from the mixtape.

== Critical reception ==
Days Before Rodeo ratings
Review scores
Source	Rating
The 405	4/5 stars
Exclaim!	7/10
Now	8/10
XXL	6/10

Days Before Rodeo re-release ratings
Review scores
Source	Rating
Clash	9/10
Pitchfork	7.7/10

Days Before Rodeo was met with widespread critical acclaim from music critics. Jacob Roy from The 405 wrote: "While some may feel he opts for style over substance, all the distorted baselines and 'straight up' ad-libs play a purpose and a role. Days Before Rodeo proves Travis does everything for a reason. When listening to the album each song plays a role and as a whole it makes for a incredibly engrossing experience. While his lyrical ability may be questioned, it doesn't really cross your mind when you are in awe of the piece that he has painted for you. He has a mission statement and he is going to stick by it. 'We will understand it if they don't, we don't want they bullshit no more.' It wouldn't be a stretch to say Travis Scott could be at the forefront for a new generation of hip-hop that have their eyes on the bigger picture". Eric Diep of XXL commented that the album "displays the Houston rapper's eclectic production style, as well as his boastful raps that are similar to his mentors Kanye West and T.I.", while calling it "some great new material that we've been missing from him since his excellent debut, Owl Pharaoh."

In November 2018, The Nicholls Worth included Days Before Rodeo in its list of the best mixtapes of the past decade, alongside Acid Rap (Chance the Rapper, 2013), A Love Letter to You (Trippie Redd, 2017), No Ceilings (Lil Wayne, 2009), Barter 6 (Young Thug, 2015), and Luv Is Rage (Lil Uzi Vert, 2015). In a positive review of the album following its re-release, Clash's Robin Murray wrote that "listening to [Days Before Rodeo] in 2024 is a kind of Möbius strip experience", stating that when listening, the "past and present are folded into one". Murray added that the album's bonus cuts were "preserved for posterity". Similarly, Ritchie Matthew for Pitchfork wrote that the mixtape "is a time capsule of Scott’s chameleonic production prowess and his budding curatorial skill". He stated that "compared to later releases, Days Before Rodeo is an exercise in restraint, lacking an extensive list of lyrical features", while praising its production.

=== Year-end lists ===
Select year-end rankings of Days Before Rodeo
Publication	List	Rank	Ref.
Complex	The 50 Best Albums of 2014	6	
Pigeons & Planes	The Best Albums of 2014	16	

== Commercial performance ==
The 2024 re-release of Days Before Rodeo debuted at number two on the US Billboard 200, earning 361,000 album-equivalent units, of which 331,000 were pure album sales. The album debuted at number one on the US Top R&B/Hip-Hop Albums chart, marking Scott's fourth consecutive album to debut at the top of the chart. These figures marked the fourth-highest debut of any album during the year and the highest for any rap album. On August 23, the album competed with Sabrina Carpenter's Short n' Sweet, which released the same day.

In the album's fourth week, during the chart week ending September 19, 2024, the album ascended to number one on the US Billboard 200 chart, earning 156,000 album-equivalent units, of which 150,000 were pure album sales. The album accumulated a total of 7,94 million on-demand official streams of the album's songs in the charting week. The album's vinyl sales comprised 149,000 units, the largest for any rap album, and the sixth largest week on vinyl across all genres, since Luminate began tracking sales in 1991. Furthermore, the album saw a 1,295% increase in sales, jumping from number 106 to 1 on the chart; an increase attributed to the fact that pre-ordered vinyl editions shipped that week. Following its sole week atop the chart, it became the first album to drop off the US Billboard 200 entirely from number one.

== Track listing ==
Days Before Rodeo track listing
No.	Title	Writer(s)	Producer(s)	Length
1.	"Days Before Rodeo: The Prayer"	Jacques Webster II; Michael Dean; Ebony Oshunrinde; Philip Glass	Travis Scott; Mike Dean; WondaGurl	3:22
2.	"Mamacita" (featuring Rich Homie Quan and Young Thug)	Webster; Dequantes Lamar; Jeffery Williams; Dean; Leland Wayne; Dacoury Natche; Raymond Jackson; Homer Banks; Carl Hampton	Travis Scott; Dean; Metro Boomin; DJ Dahi	4:35
3.	"Quintana, Pt. 2"	Webster; Dean; Joshua Luellen	Dean; Southside; Lil' C; AudioKlique	4:59
4.	"Drugs You Should Try It"	Webster; Dean; Ryan Vojtesak; Trocon Roberts Jr.	Travis Scott; Dean; Charlie Handsome; FKi 1st	3:29
5.	"Don't Play" (featuring the 1975 and Big Sean)	Webster; Matthew Healy; George Daniel; Adam Hann; Ross MacDonald; Sean Anderson; Dean; Anderson Hernandez; Allen Ritter; Anthony Kilhoffer	Travis Scott; Dean; Vinylz; Ritter^{[a]}; Kilhoffer^{[a]}	4:46
6.	"Skyfall" (featuring Young Thug)	Webster; J. Williams; Dean; Wayne	Travis Scott; Dean; Metro Boomin	5:19
7.	"Zombies"	Webster; Dean; Lexus Lewis	Dean; Lex Luger	4:20
8.	"Sloppy Toppy" (featuring Migos and Peewee Longway)	Webster; Quavious Marshall; Kirshnik Ball; Kiari Cephus; Quincy Williams; Dean; Roberts; Edna Wright; Gregory Perry; Angelo Bond; Terrance Harrison; Bolden	Dean; FKi 1st	4:34
9.	"Basement Freestyle"	Webster; Dean; Lewis	Dean; Lex Luger; Metro Boomin	4:08
10.	"Backyard"	Webster; Dean; Ozan Yildirim; Joshua Scruggs; Marvin Gaye; Gwen Gordy Fuqua; Sandra Greene	Dean; Oz; Syk Sense	4:31
11.	"Grey"	Webster; Dean; Taji Ausar; Joseph Hill Jr.	Dean; Tane Runo; J. Hill	3:48
12.	"Bacc" (bonus track)	Webster; Dean; Wayne	Dean; Metro Boomin	2:13
Total length:				47:39

Digital vault edition bonus tracks
No.	Title	Writer(s)	Producer(s)	Length
13.	"Mo City Flexologist"	Webster; Carlton Mays Jr.	Honorable C.N.O.T.E.	3:33
14.	"Too Many Chances"	Webster; Dean	Dean	1:57
15.	"Yeah Yeah" (featuring Young Thug)	Webster; J. Williams; Bryan Simmons; Wesley Glass; Luellen	TM88; Wheezy; Southside	4:37
16.	"Serenade"	Webster; Dean	Dean	3:16
17.	"Whole Lots Changed"	Webster; Chauncey Hollis, Jr.; Derrick Coleman; Jabril Abdur-Rahman	Hit-Boy	3:05
Total length:				64:27

Digital vault 2 bonus tracks
No.	Title	Writer(s)	Producer(s)	Length
13.	"Hold On" (featuring Young Thug and Quavo)	Webster; J. Williams; Marshall; Glass	Wheezy	2:09
14.	"Respected"	Webster		3:19
Total length:				69:55

Digital vault 3 bonus tracks
No.	Title	Writer(s)	Producer(s)	Length
13.	"Naughty"	Webster; Wayne	Metro Boomin	3:16
14.	"Too Many Options" (featuring Young Thug)	Webster; J. Williams; Ronald LaTour Jr.; Kevin Gomringer; Tim Gomringer	Cardo; Cubeatz	3:45
Total length:				75:23

Digital vault 4 bonus tracks
No.	Title	Writer(s)	Producer(s)	Length
13.	"Quintana, Pt. 2" (Mike Dean Outro)	Webster; Dean; Luellen	Dean; Southside; Lil' C; AudioKlique	3:50
14.	"Whoudini" (featuring Playboi Carti)	Webster; Jordan Carter; Jordan Jenks	Pi'erre Bourne	1:54
Total length:				81:07

Notes

- ^{^[a]} signifies a co-producer
- "Quintana Pt. 2" originally featured uncredited vocals from T.I., which were removed from the streaming media release of the mixtape
- "Grey" features background vocals from James Fauntleroy

Sample credits

- "Days Before Rodeo: The Prayer" contains a sample of Philip Glass's original composition "Music Box (Opening Theme)".
- "Don't Play" contains an interpolation of "M.O.N.E.Y.", written by George Daniel, Matthew Healy, Adam Hann and Ross MacDonald, as performed by The 1975.
- "Mamacita" contains a sample of "(If Loving You Is Wrong) I Don't Want to Be Right", written by Homer Banks, Carl Hampton and Raymond Jackson, as performed by Bobby "Blue" Bland.
- "Sloppy Toppy" contains a sample of "Spend the Night With Me", written by Greg Perry, Angelo Bond and Terrance Harrison, as performed by Edna Wright.
- "Backyard" contains a sample of "Distant Lover (Live at Oakland Coliseum, CA, 1974)", written by Marvin Gaye, Gwen Fuqua and Sandra Greene, as performed by Gaye.

== Personnel ==
Credits are adapted from Tidal.

Musicians

- Travis Scott – vocals (all tracks)
- Rich Homie Quan – vocals (2)
- Young Thug – vocals (2, 6)
- T.I. – vocals (3)
- The 1975 – vocals (5)
- Big Sean – vocals (5)
- Offset – vocals (8)
- Quavo – vocals (8)
- Takeoff – vocals (8)
- Peewee Longway – vocals (8)

Technical

- Mike Dean – mastering (all tracks), mixing (3–5, 8–10, 7–12)
- Alex Tumay – mixing (1–3, 6–7, 11)
- Travis Scott – mixing (all tracks)

== Charts ==
=== Weekly charts ===
Weekly chart performance for Days Before Rodeo
Chart (2024)	Peak position
Australian Albums (ARIA)	9
Australian Hip Hop/R&B Albums (ARIA)	1
Austrian Albums (Ö3 Austria)	10
Belgian Albums (Ultratop Flanders)	26
Belgian Albums (Ultratop Wallonia)	19
Canadian Albums (Billboard)	9
Danish Albums (Hitlisten)	19
Finnish Albums (Suomen virallinen lista)	21
French Albums (SNEP)	16
German Albums (Offizielle Top 100)	17
Hungarian Albums (MAHASZ)	18
Icelandic Albums (Tónlistinn)	7
Irish Albums (Official Charts)	23
Italian Albums (FIMI)	28
Lithuanian Albums (AGATA)	17
New Zealand Albums (RMNZ)	12
Norwegian Albums (VG-lista)	10
Polish Albums (ZPAV)	19
Portuguese Albums (AFP)	10
Spanish Albums (Promusicae)	53
Swedish Albums (Sverigetopplistan)	38
Swiss Albums (Schweizer Hitparade)	4
UK Albums (Official Charts)	15
UK R&B Albums (Official Charts)	1
US Billboard 200	1
US Top R&B/Hip-Hop Albums (Billboard)	1

=== Year-end charts ===
2024 year-end chart performance for Days Before Rodeo
Chart (2024)	Position
US Billboard 200	100
US Top R&B/Hip-Hop Albums (Billboard)	35

== Release history ==
List of release dates and formats for Days Before Rodeo
Region	Date	Format(s)	Version	Label(s)	Ref.
United States	August 18, 2014	SoundCloud	Original	Grand Hustle	
Various	August 23, 2024	Digital download; streaming; CD; vinyl	Original	Cactus Jack; Epic	
