= Quavo discography =

- Quavo in 2025
- Studio albums: 3
- Singles: 61
- Other songs: 34

The discography of American rapper Quavious Keyate Marshall, known as Quavo, consists of three studio albums, two collaborative albums, two compilation albums, two mixtapes, one extended play, and sixty-one singles.

Quavo has been featured on four singles that have peaked within the top 10 of the Billboard Hot 100, including DJ Khaled's "I'm the One" and "No Brainer" the former of which reached number one, along with "Congratulations", which peaked at number 8 on the Billboard Hot 100. On October 12, 2018, he released his debut solo album, Quavo Huncho, which peaked at number two on the Billboard 200.

== Albums ==
=== Studio albums ===
List of studio albums
Title	Album details	Peak chart positions							Certifications
Title	Album details	US	AUS	CAN	DEN	NZ	SWE	UK	Certifications
Quavo Huncho	Released: October 12, 2018; Label: Quality Control, Capitol, Motown; Formats: CD, LP, digital download	2	16	2	15	13	19	16	RIAA: Gold
Rocket Power	Released: August 18, 2023; Label: Quality Control, Motown; Formats: CD, digital download, streaming	18	—	41	—	31	—	—	
Qrömelife	Released: October 2, 2026; Label: Quality Control, Motown; Formats: Digital download, streaming	103	98	—	—	—	—	—	
"—" denotes a recording that did not chart or was not released in that territory.

=== Collaborative albums ===
List of collaborative albums
Title	Album details	Peak chart positions		
Title	Album details	US	CAN	UK
Huncho Jack, Jack Huncho (with Travis Scott as Huncho Jack)	Released: December 21, 2017; Label: Quality Control, Capitol, Motown, Grand Hustle, Epic, YRN The Label, Cactus Jack; Formats: LP, digital download, streaming	3	6	34
Only Built for Infinity Links (with Takeoff)	Released: October 7, 2022; Label: Quality Control, Motown; Formats: LP, digital download, streaming	7	20	—
"—" denotes a recording that did not chart or was not released in that territory.

=== Compilation albums ===
Title	Album details
Quality Control: Control the Streets, Volume 1 (as part of Quality Control)	Released: December 8, 2017; Label: Quality Control, Capitol, Motown; Formats: CD, digital download, streaming
Quality Control: Control the Streets, Volume 2 (as part of Quality Control)	Released: August 16, 2019; Label: Quality Control, Motown; Formats: CD, digital download, streaming

== Extended plays ==
Title	EP details
Culture III (Quavo's Way)	Released: June 14, 2021; Label: YRN the Label, Quality Control, Capitol, Motown; Format: Digital download, streaming

== Mixtapes ==
Title	Mixtape details
ATL	Released: June 23, 2017; Label: New Power Soul; Format: Digital download
Quality Control Music	Released: November 9, 2017; Label: Quality Control; Format: Digital download

== Singles ==
=== As lead artist ===
List of singles as lead artist, with selected chart positions and certifications, showing year released and album name
Title	Year	Peak chart positions							Certifications	Album
Title	Year	US	US R&B/HH	US Rap	CAN	FRA	UK	WW	Certifications	Album
"Champions" (with Kanye West, Gucci Mane, Big Sean, 2 Chainz, Travis Scott, Yo Gotti and Desiigner)	2016	71	22	15	73	—	128	—	RIAA: Platinum; BPI: Silver	Non-album singles
"Whippin" (featuring Chris Brown and Smoke Boys)	2016	—	—	—	—	—	—	—		Non-album singles
"Cuffed Up" (featuring PartyNextDoor)	2016	—	—	—	—	—	—	—		Non-album singles
"Trapstar"	2016	—	—	—	—	—	—	—		ATL
"No Hook" (featuring Lil Yatchy)	2016	—	—	—	—	—	—	—		Non-album single
"Go Off" (with Lil Uzi Vert and Travis Scott)	2017	—	39	—	—	124	—	—	RIAA: Gold	The Fate of the Furious: The Album
"Ice Tray" (as part of Quality Control with Lil Yachty)	2017	74	30	—	67	—	—	—	MC: Gold	Control the Streets, Volume 1
"Blow like a Whistle" (as part of Quality Control with YRN Lingo)	2017	—	—	—	—	—	—	—		Control the Streets, Volume 1
"Hellcat" (as part of Quality Control)	2017	—	—	—	—	—	—	—		Control the Streets, Volume 1
"Holiday" (as part of Quality Control featuring Lil Yatchy)	2017	—	—	—	—	—	—	—		Control the Streets, Volume 1
"She for Keeps" (as part of Quality Control with Nicki Minaj)	2017	—	—	—	—	—	—	—		Control the Streets, Volume 1
"South Africa" (as part of Quality Control)	2017	—	—	—	—	—	—	—		Control the Streets, Volume 1
"Paper Over Here"	2017	—	—	—	—	—	—	—		
"Too Hotty" (as part of Quality Control with Takeoff and Offset)	2017	—	—	—	—	—	—	—		Control the Streets, Volume 1
"Finessin" (featuring Seff tha Gaffla)	2017	—	—	—	—	—	—	—		Non-album single
"Workin Me"	2018	52	18	16	48	—	—	—	RIAA: Platinum	Quavo Huncho
"Lamb Talk"	2018	—	—	—	—	—	—	—		Quavo Huncho
"Bubble Gum"	2018	—	—	—	—	—	—	—		Quavo Huncho
"Pass Out" (featuring 21 Savage)	2018	61	29	—	56	—	94	—		Quavo Huncho
"Magical Poof" (featuring Lil Yatchy and JBAN$2)	2018	—	—	—	—	—	—	—		
"Bacc At It Again" (with Yella Beezy and Gucci Mane)	2019	78	33	24	—	—	—	—	RIAA: Gold	Baccend Beezy
"Too Much Shaft" (with Saweetie)	2019	—	—	—	—	—	—	—		Shaft (soundtrack)
"In da Trap" (featuring Lost God, Flippa and Mo Bucks)	2019	—	—	—	—	—	—	—		Non-album single
"Double Trouble" (as part of Quality Control featuring Meek Mill)	2019	—	—	—	—	—	—	—		Control the Streets, Volume 2
"A Million" (featuring Veronica Vega)	2019	—	—	—	—	—	—	—		Non-album singles
"Open House" (featuring Street Bud)	2020	—	—	—	—	—	—	—		Non-album singles
"Too Blessed" (with Rich the Kid and Takeoff)	2020	—	—	—	—	—	—	—		Lucky 7
"Pussy Talk (Remix)" (featuring City Girls, Jack Harlow and Lil Wayne)	2020	—	—	—	—	—	—	—		Non-album singles
"Strub tha Ground" (with Yung Miami)	2021	— (Note: "Strub tha Ground" did not enter the Billboard Hot 100, but peaked at number 13 on the Bubbling Under Hot 100 chart.)	—	—	—	—	—	—		Non-album singles
"Hotel Lobby (Unc & Phew)" (with Takeoff)	2022	55	12	11	55	—	—	77	RIAA: Platinum	Only Built for Infinity Links
"Us vs. Them" (with Takeoff & Gucci Mane)	2022	— (Note: "Us vs. Them" did not enter the Billboard Hot 100, but peaked at number 21 on the Bubbling Under Hot 100 chart.)	—	—	—	—	—	—		Only Built for Infinity Links
"Big Stunna" (with Takeoff & Birdman)	2022	—	—	—	—	—	—	—		Only Built for Infinity Links
"Nothing Changed" (with Takeoff)	2022	— (Note: "Nothing Changed" did not enter the Billboard Hot 100, but peaked at number 17 on the Bubbling Under Hot 100 chart.)	44	—	—	—	—	—		Only Built for Infinity Links
"See Bout It" (with Takeoff & Mustard)	2022	—	—	—	—	—	—	—		Only Built for Infinity Links
"Shooters Inside My Crib"	2022	—	—	—	—	—	—	—		Non-album singles
"Without You"	2023	—	—	—	—	—	—	—		Non-album singles
"Greatness"	2023	— (Note: "Greatness" did not enter the Billboard Hot 100, but peaked at number 19 on the Bubbling Under Hot 100 Singles chart.)	—	—	—	—	—	—		Rocket Power
"Honey Bun"	2023	—	45	—	—	—	—	—		Non-album singles
"Yessir" (with R-Mean and Scott Storch)	2023	—	—	—	—	—	—	—		Non-album singles
"Baby" (with Anuel AA featuring DJ Luian and Mambo Kingz)	2023	—	—	—	—	—	—	—		Non-album singles
"Turn Yo Clic Up" (with Future)	2023	83	24	16	—	—	—	—		Rocket Power
"Swim" (with Swxm)	2023	—	—	—	—	—	—	—		Non-album singles
"Didn't Come to Play" (with Lil Darius)	2023	—	—	—	—	—	—	—		Non-album singles
"Himothy"	2024	—	—	—	—	—	—	—		Non-album singles
"Real One" (with Rich the Kid)	2024	—	—	—	—	—	—	—		Non-album singles
"Potato Loaded" (with Destroy Lonely)	2024	—	—	—	—	—	—	—		Non-album singles
"Tender"	2024	—	—	—	—	—	—	—		Non-album singles
"Over Hoes and Bitches"	2024	—	—	—	—	—	—	—		Non-album singles
"Clear the Smoke"	2024	—	—	—	—	—	—	—		Non-album singles
"Mink"	2024	—	—	—	—	—	—	—		Non-album singles
"Tough" (with Lana Del Rey)	2024	33	—	—	28	—	32	21		Non-album singles
"Fly" (with Lenny Kravitz)	2024	—	—	—	—	—	—	—		Non-album singles
"If I Fall" (featuring Ty Dolla Sign and We Are Dreaming)	2024	—	—	—	—	—	—	—		Non-album singles
"Slow It Down" (with the Kid Laroi)	2024	—	—	—	—	—	—	—		Non-album singles
"Georgia Ways" (with Luke Bryan and Teddy Swims)	2024	— (Note: "Georgia Ways" did not enter the Billboard Hot 100, but peaked at number 7 on the Bubbling Under Hot 100 chart.)	—	—	—	—	—	—		Non-album singles
"What We Doing" (with Lil Unky)	2025	—	—	—	—	—	—	—		Non-album singles
"Trappa Rappa"	2025	—	—	—	—	—	—	—		Non-album singles
"No Matter What" (with Michelle Langone)	2025	—	—	—	—	—	—	—		Non-album singles
"Legends" (with Lil Baby)	2025	— (Note: "Legends" did not enter the Billboard Hot 100, but peaked at number 1 on the Bubbling Under Hot 100 chart.)	23	14	—	—	—	—		Non-album singles
"Dope Boy Phone"	2025	—	—	—	—	—	—	—		Non-album singles
"Mutt" (with Nav)	2026	—	—	—	—	—	—	—		Non-album singles
"Haavin"	2026	—	—	—	—	—	—	—		Qrömelife
"Trance (Walk It Down)"	2026	—	—	—	—	—	—	—		Qrömelife
"Backwards" (with T.I.)	2026	—	—	—	—	—	—	—		Qrömelife
"House Music" (featuring Justin Timberlake)	2026	—	—	—	—	—	—	—		Qrömelife
"—" denotes a recording that did not chart or was not released in that territory.

=== As featured artist ===
List of singles as featured artist, with selected chart positions and certifications, showing year released and album name
Title	Year	Peak chart positions										Certifications	Album
Title	Year	US	US R&B/HH	US Rap	AUS	CAN	FRA	GER	NZ	SWI	UK	Certifications	Album
"What Are You Thinking?" (Mendo Kelly featuring Quavo)	2014	—	—	—	—	—	—	—	—	—	—		Non-album single
"Get Home" (JR Castro featuring Kid Ink and Quavo)	2015	—	— (Note: "Get Home" did not enter the Hot R&B/Hip-Hop Songs chart, but peaked at number one on the Bubbling Under R&B/Hip-Hop Singles chart.)	—	—	—	—	—	—	—	—		Sexpectations, Vol.1
"F Cancer (Boosie)" (Young Thug featuring Quavo)	2016	—	— (Note: "F Cancer (Boosie)" did not enter the Hot R&B/Hip-Hop Songs chart, but peaked at number five on the Bubbling Under R&B/Hip-Hop Singles chart.)	—	—	—	—	—	—	—	—		I'm Up
"Minnesota" (Lil Yachty featuring Quavo, Skippa Da Flippa and Young Thug)	2016	— (Note: "Minnesota" did not enter the Billboard Hot 100, but peaked at number 21 on the Bubbling Under Hot 100 chart.)	— (Note: "Minnesota" did not enter the Hot R&B/Hip-Hop Songs chart, but peaked at number three on the Bubbling Under R&B/Hip-Hop Singles chart.)	—	—	—	—	—	—	—	—	RIAA: Gold	Lil Boat
"Mr. Perfect" (Skippa Da Flippa featuring Quavo)	2016	—	—	—	—	—	—	—	—	—	—		I'm Havin 2
"Pick Up the Phone" (Young Thug and Travis Scott featuring Quavo)	2016	43	13	7	—	62	95	—	—	—	181	RIAA: 2× Platinum; BPI: Gold; MC: 3× Platinum; SNEP: Platinum	Birds in the Trap Sing McKnight
"Swervin Down" (Skippa Da Flippa featuring Quavo)	2016	—	—	—	—	—	—	—	—	—	—		Non-album single
"Castro" (Yo Gotti featuring Kanye West, Big Sean, Quavo and 2 Chainz)	2016	— (Note: "Castro" did not enter the Billboard Hot 100, but peaked at number 16 on the Bubbling Under Hot 100 chart.)	— (Note: "Castro" did not enter the Hot R&B/Hip-Hop Songs chart, but peaked at number six on the Bubbling Under R&B/Hip-Hop Singles chart.)	—	—	—	—	—	—	—	—		White Friday (CM9)
"Good Drank" (2 Chainz featuring Gucci Mane and Quavo)	2017	70	32	22	—	—	—	—	—	—	—	RIAA: 2× Platinum	Pretty Girls Like Trap Music
"Congratulations" (Post Malone featuring Quavo)	2017	8	5	3	30	14	110	88	24	77	26	RIAA: 1.4× Diamond (14× Platinum); ARIA: 10× Platinum; BPI: 2× Platinum; BVMI: Gold; MC: Diamond; RMNZ: 2× Platinum; SNEP: Platinum	Stoney
"The Let Out" (Jidenna featuring Quavo)	2017	—	—	—	—	—	—	—	—	—	—		The Chief
"Want Her" (DJ Mustard featuring Quavo and YG)	2017	—	—	—	—	—	—	—	—	—	—	RIAA: Platinum	Cold Summer
"Wind Up" (Keke Palmer featuring Quavo)	2017	—	—	—	—	—	—	—	—	—	—		Non-album single
"I'm the One" (DJ Khaled featuring Justin Bieber, Quavo, Chance the Rapper and Lil Wayne)	2017	1	1	1	1	1	11	4	1	6	1	RIAA: Diamond (10× Platinum); ARIA: 8× Platinum; BPI: 2× Platinum; BVMI: Platinum; IFPI SWI: 2× Platinum; MC: 7× Platinum; RMNZ: Platinum; SNEP: Platinum	Grateful
"Trap Paris" (Machine Gun Kelly featuring Quavo and Ty Dolla Sign)	2017	—	—	—	—	98	—	—	—	—	—	RIAA: Gold	Bloom
"Portland" (Drake featuring Quavo and Travis Scott)	2017	9	6	3	—	6	119	77	38	31	27	RIAA: 2× Platinum; ARIA: 2× Platinum; BPI: Platinum	More Life
"Raf" (ASAP Mob featuring ASAP Rocky, Playboi Carti, Quavo, Lil Uzi Vert and Frank Ocean)	2017	—	— (Note: "RAF" did not enter the Hot R&B/Hip-Hop Songs chart, but peaked at number ten on the Bubbling Under R&B/Hip-Hop Singles chart.)	—	—	82	—	—	—	—	—	RIAA: Platinum; ARIA: Gold	Cozy Tapes Vol. 2: Too Cozy
"Strip That Down" (Liam Payne featuring Quavo)	2017	10	—	—	2	11	32	10	5	30	3	RIAA: 3× Platinum; ARIA: 5× Platinum; BPI: 2× Platinum; BVMI: Platinum; MC: 7× Platinum; RMNZ: Platinum; SNEP: Gold	LP1
"Homie Bitch" (Lil Durk featuring Quavo and Lil Yachty)	2017	—	—	—	—	—	—	—	—	—	—		Non-album single
"Know No Better" (Major Lazer featuring Travis Scott, Camila Cabello and Quavo)	2017	87	36	—	34	30	18	40	20	30	15	RIAA: Gold; ARIA: 2× Platinum; BPI: Platinum; RMNZ: Gold; SNEP: Platinum	Know No Better
"Sway" (NexXthursday featuring Quavo and Lil Yachty)	2017	—	—	—	—	—	—	—	—	—	—		Non-album singles
"Believe" (A-Trak featuring Quavo and Lil Yachty)	2017	—	—	—	—	—	—	—	—	—	—		Non-album singles
"Forever" (Sigma featuring Quavo and Sebastian Kole)	2017	—	—	—	—	—	—	—	—	—	—		Non-album singles
"Catch a Body" (LIVVIA featuring Quavo)	2018	—	—	—	—	—	—	—	—	—	—		Non-album singles
"Savior" (Iggy Azalea featuring Quavo)	2018	— (Note: "Savior" did not enter the Billboard Hot 100, but peaked at number seven on the Bubbling Under Hot 100 chart.)	—	—	—	—	161	—	— (Note: "Savior" did not enter the NZ Top 40 Singles Chart, but peaked at number eight on the NZ Heatseeker Singles Chart.)	—	—		Non-album single
"Pineapple" (Ty Dolla Sign featuring Gucci Mane and Quavo)	2018	— (Note: "Pineapple" did not enter the Billboard Hot 100, but peaked at number 18 on the Bubbling Under Hot 100 chart.)	— (Note: "Pineapple" did not enter the Hot R&B/Hip-Hop Songs chart, but peaked at number four on the Bubbling Under R&B/Hip-Hop Singles chart.)	—	—	91	—	—	—	—	—	RIAA: Gold	Beach House 3
"Cupido" (Sfera Ebbasta featuring Quavo)	2018	—	—	—	—	—	—	—	—	48	—		Rockstar
"Bigger Than You" (2 Chainz featuring Drake and Quavo)	2018	53	28	24	—	43	—	—	— (Note: "Bigger Than You" did not enter the NZ Top 40 Singles Chart, but peaked at number eight on the NZ Heatseeker Singles Chart.)	—	—	RIAA: Platinum; ARIA: Gold	Non-album single
"VVS" (Ufo361 featuring Quavo)	2018	—	—	—	—	—	—	16	—	25	—		VVS
"No Brainer" (DJ Khaled featuring Justin Bieber, Chance the Rapper and Quavo)	2018	5	4	—	6	4	59	15	2	12	3	RIAA: 2× Platinum; ARIA: 4× Platinum; BPI: Platinum; MC: 3× Platinum; RMNZ: Platinum	Father of Asahd
"100 Bands" (Mustard featuring Quavo, 21 Savage, YG and Meek Mill)	2019	— (Note: "100 Bands" did not enter the Billboard Hot 100, but peaked at number 25 on the Bubbling Under Hot 100 chart.)	—	—	—	—	—	—	—	—	—	RIAA: Gold	Perfect Ten
"Chase the Money" (E-40 featuring Quavo, Roddy Ricch, ASAP Ferg and Schoolboy Q)	2019	—	—	—	—	—	—	—	—	—	—		Practice Makes Paper
"Had Enough" (Don Toliver featuring Quavo and Offset)	2019	52	23	19	—	42	—	—	—	44	60	MC: Gold	JackBoys and Heaven or Hell
"Intentions" (Justin Bieber featuring Quavo)	2020	5	4	—	2	4	58	23	1	13	8	RIAA: 4× Platinum; ARIA: 6× Platinum; BPI: Platinum; BVMI: Gold; MC: 5× Platinum; RMNZ: Platinum; SNEP: Gold	Changes
"Alright" (Hvme and 24kGoldn featuring Quavo)	2021	—	—	—	—	—	—	—	—	—	—		Non-album single
"Shmoney" (Bobby Shmurda featuring Quavo and Rowdy Rebel)	2021	—	—	—	—	—	—	—	—	—	—		TBA
"Magic City" (Fivio Foreign featuring Quavo)	2022	—	—	—	—	—	—	—	—	—	—		B.I.B.L.E.
"No Más" (Murda Beatz featuring Quavo, J Balvin, Anitta and Pharrell Williams)	2022	—	—	—	—	—	—	—	—	—	—		Non-album singles
"Toxic" (Carson Lueders featuring Quavo)	2022	—	—	—	—	—	—	—	—	—	—		Non-album singles
"Don't Rate Me" (YoungBoy Never Broke Again featuring Quavo)	2022	—	—	—	—	—	—	—	—	—	—		The Last Slimeto
"Ring Ring" (Chase B featuring Travis Scott, Don Toliver, Quavo, and Ty Dolla Sign)	2023	—	—	—	—	—	—	—	— (Note: "Ring Ring" did not enter the NZ Top 40 Singles Chart, but peaked at number 11 on the NZ Hot Singles Chart.)	—	—		Non-album single
"What We Doing!? / Qu'est-ce qu'on fait!?" (Bushi featuring Quavo)	2024	—	—	—	—	—	—	—	—	—	—		Bushi Tape 3
"—" denotes a recording that did not chart or was not released in that territory.

=== Promotional singles ===
List of promotional singles, with selected chart positions, showing year released and album name
Title	Year	Peak chart positions						Certifications	Album
Title	Year	US	AUS	CAN	FRA Dig.	SCO	UK	Certifications	Album
"OMG" (Camila Cabello featuring Quavo)	2017	81	77	53	179	37	67	ARIA: Gold; MC: Platinum	Non-album single
"2 Souls on Fire" (Bebe Rexha featuring Quavo)	2018	—	—	—	—	—	—		Expectations
"Bipolar" (Gucci Mane featuring Quavo)	2018	—	—	—	—	—	—		Evil Genius
"Future" (with Madonna)	2019	—	—	—	16	50	— (Note: "Future" charted at number 33 on UK Downloads chart.)		Madame X
"—" denotes a recording that did not chart or was not released in that territory.

== Other charted songs ==
List of other charted songs, with selected chart positions, showing year released and album name
Title	Year	Peak chart positions								Certifications	Album
Title	Year	US	US R&B/HH	US Rap	CAN	IRE	NZ Hot	SWI	UK	Certifications	Album
"Oh My Dis Side" (Travis Scott featuring Quavo)	2015	—	— (Note: "Oh My Dis Side" did not enter the Hot R&B/Hip-Hop Songs chart, but peaked at number nine on the Bubbling Under R&B/Hip-Hop Singles chart.)	—	—	—	—	—	—	RIAA: Platinum	Rodeo
"Guwop" (Young Thug featuring Quavo, Offset, and Young Scooter)	2016	— (Note: "Guwop" did not enter the Billboard Hot 100, but peaked at number ten on the Bubbling Under Hot 100 Singles chart.)	45	—	—	—	—	—	—	RIAA: Platinum	Jeffery
"The Difference" (Meek Mill featuring Quavo)	2016	84	35	—	—	—	—	—	—		DC4
"Ball Player" (Meek Mill featuring Quavo)	2017	—	— (Note: "Ball Player" did not enter the Hot R&B/Hip-Hop Songs chart, but peaked at number seven on the Bubbling Under R&B/Hip-Hop Singles chart.)	—	—	—	—	—	—		Wins & Losses
"Rap Saved Me" (21 Savage, Offset, and Metro Boomin featuring Quavo)	2017	64	26	21	46	—	—	—	—	RIAA: Platinum	Without Warning
"Eye 2 Eye" (with Travis Scott as Huncho Jack featuring Takeoff)	2017	65	27	25	55	—	—	—	—		Huncho Jack, Jack Huncho
"Modern Slavery" (with Travis Scott as Huncho Jack)	2017	68	29	—	59	—	—	—	—		Huncho Jack, Jack Huncho
"Black & Chinese" (with Travis Scott as Huncho Jack)	2017	71	31	—	58	—	—	—	—		Huncho Jack, Jack Huncho
"Dubai Shit" (with Travis Scott as Huncho Jack featuring Offset)	2017	83	35	—	63	—	—	—	—		Huncho Jack, Jack Huncho
"Huncho Jack" (with Travis Scott as Huncho Jack)	2017	87	38	—	75	—	—	—	—		Huncho Jack, Jack Huncho
"Motorcycle Patches" (with Travis Scott as Huncho Jack)	2017	90	39	—	71	—	—	—	—		Huncho Jack, Jack Huncho
"Saint" (with Travis Scott as Huncho Jack)	2017	92	40	—	72	—	—	—	—		Huncho Jack, Jack Huncho
"Saint Laurent Mask" (with Travis Scott as Huncho Jack)	2017	—	—	—	93	—	—	—	—		Huncho Jack, Jack Huncho
"Go" (with Travis Scott as Huncho Jack)	2017	—	—	—	100	—	—	—	—		Huncho Jack, Jack Huncho
"Faith" (Nav featuring Quavo)	2018	—	—	—	72	—	—	—	—	MC: Gold	Reckless
"Who? What!" (Travis Scott featuring Quavo and Takeoff)	2018	43	26	23	41	—	—	—	— (Note: "Who? What!" did not enter the UK Singles Chart, as chart rules only allow three songs per artist to chart within the top one hundred at a time, but peaked at number 98 on the UK Streaming Chart.)	RIAA: Platinum; MC: Gold	Astroworld
"Biggest Alley Oop"	2018	86	40	—	69	—	19	—	—		Quavo Huncho
"Huncho Dreams"	2018	93	44	—	—	—	—	—	—		Quavo Huncho
"Flip the Switch" (featuring Drake)	2018	48	23	21	26	76	7	80	55	RIAA: Gold	Quavo Huncho
"Give It to Em" (featuring Saweetie)	2018	— (Note: "Give It to Em" did not enter the Billboard Hot 100, but peaked at number ten on the Bubbling Under Hot 100 Singles chart.)	— (Note: "Give It to Em" did not enter the Hot R&B/Hip-Hop Songs chart, but peaked at number two on the Bubbling Under R&B/Hip-Hop Singles chart.)	—	—	—	—	—	—		Quavo Huncho
"Shine"	2018	— (Note: "Shine" did not enter the Billboard Hot 100, but peaked at number 23 on the Bubbling Under Hot 100 Singles chart.)	— (Note: "Shine" did not enter the Hot R&B/Hip-Hop Songs chart, but peaked at number 10 on the Bubbling Under R&B/Hip-Hop Singles chart.)	—	—	—	—	—	—		Quavo Huncho
"Champagne Rosé" (featuring Madonna and Cardi B)	2018	— (Note: "Champagne Rosé" did not enter the Billboard Hot 100, but peaked at number 20 on the Bubbling Under Hot 100 chart.)	— (Note: "Champagne Rosé" did not enter the Hot R&B/Hip-Hop Songs chart, but peaked at number eight on the Bubbling Under R&B/Hip-Hop Singles chart.)	—	—	—	—	—	—		Quavo Huncho
"Lose It" (featuring Lil Baby)	2018	100	47	—	68	—	—	—	—		Quavo Huncho
"Rerun" (featuring Travis Scott)	2018	88	41	—	70	—	15	—	—		Quavo Huncho
"Lost It" (Rich the Kid featuring Quavo and Offset)	2018	—	—	—	91	—	—	—	—	RIAA: Gold	The World Is Yours
"Shake the Room" (Pop Smoke featuring Quavo)	2020	93	43	—	98	—	—	—	76	RIAA: Gold; BPI: Silver	Meet the Woo 2
"Pick Up" (DaBaby featuring Quavo)	2020	44	19	16	78	—	8	—	—	RIAA: Gold	Blame It on Baby
"Aim for the Moon" (Pop Smoke featuring Quavo)	2020	34	16	13	27	—	—	—	—		Shoot for the Stars, Aim for the Moon
"Snitching" (Pop Smoke featuring Quavo and Future)	2020	54	30	—	51	—	—	—	—		Shoot for the Stars, Aim for the Moon
"West Coast Shit" (Pop Smoke featuring Tyga and Quavo)	2020	65	37	—	48	—	—	—	—		Shoot for the Stars, Aim for the Moon
"Back Door" (Pop Smoke featuring Quavo and Kodak Black)	2021	— (Note: "Back Door" did not enter the Billboard Hot 100, but peaked at number 20 on the Bubbling Under Hot 100 chart.)	—	—	76	—	—	—	—		Faith
"Party" (DJ Khaled featuring Quavo and Takeoff)	2022	66	22	20	76	—	—	—	—		God Did
"To the Bone" (with Takeoff and YoungBoy Never Broke Again)	2022	83	24	—	—	—	32	—	—		Only Built for Infinity Links
"Chocolate" (with Takeoff, Young Thug, and Gunna)	2022	—	48	—	—	—	—	—	—		Only Built for Infinity Links
"Messy" (with Takeoff)	2022	— (Note: "Messy" did not enter the Billboard Hot 100, but peaked at number four on the Bubbling Under Hot 100 chart.)	42	—	—	—	—	—	—		Only Built for Infinity Links
"Fueled Up"	2023	—	—	—	—	—	39	—	—		Rocket Power
"Patty Cake" (with Takeoff)	2023	— (Note: "Patty Cake" did not enter the Billboard Hot 100, but peaked at number 13 on the Bubbling Under Hot 100 Singles chart.)	38	—	—	—	27	—	—		Rocket Power
"Hold Me"	2023	—	50	—	—	—	—	—	—		Rocket Power
"Paperwork" (Kanye West and Ty Dolla Sign as ¥$ featuring Quavo)	2024	64	29	24	53	—	—	—	— (Note: "Paperwork" did not enter the UK Singles Chart, but peaked at number 93 on the UK Independent Singles Chart.)		Vultures 1
"Take Me Thru Dere" (with Metro Boomin, Breskii and YK Niece)	2025	51	10	7	—	—	—	—	—		A Futuristic Summa
"Shabang" (Drake featuring Quavo and Takeoff)	2026	4	4	—	5	—	—	—	—		Iceman
"BA" (featuring Future)	2026	94	24	14	—	—	11	—	—		Qrömelife
"Away" (featuring Offset)	2026	—	—	—	—	—	40	—	—		Qrömelife
"Baby Breath" (featuring Pharrell Williams, Tyler, the Creator and ASAP Rocky)	2026	—	—	—	—	—	30	—	—		Qrömelife
"—" denotes a recording that did not chart or was not released in that territory.

== Guest appearances ==
List of non-single guest appearances, with other performing artists, showing year released and album name
Title	Year	Artist(s)	Album
"Yo Bitch"	2014	Frenchie, D Dash	Underrated
"Sub Zero"	2014	Young Thug	1017 Thug 2
"Familiar"	2015	Donnie Trumpet & The Social Experiment, King L	Surf
"Trap Queen" (Remix)	2015	Fetty Wap, Gucci Mane	—N/a
"Oh My Dis Side"	2015	Travis Scott	Rodeo
"Long Time"	2016	Ty Dolla Sign	Free TC
"Girlfriend" (Remix)	2016	Kap G, Ty Dolla Sign	El Southside
"Key to the Streets" (Remix)	2016	YFN Lucci, 2 Chainz, Lil Wayne	—N/a
"Black Man"	2016	T.I., Meek Mill, Ra Ra	Us or Else: Letter to the System
"Niice"	2016	Berner, Paul Wall	Packs
"Watchu Doin"	2017	Trouble, Young Thug, Skippa da Flippa	The Year in 2016
"Hold Up"	2017	French Montana, Chris Brown	None
"Playa No More"	2017	PNB Rock, A Boogie	GTTM: Goin Thru the Motions
"Bad Enough"	2017	Alexis Ayaana	Twenty One
"B.E.D." (Remix)	2017	Jacquees, Ty Dolla Sign	Since You Playin'
"Glow Up"	2017	Mary J. Blige, DJ Khaled, Missy Elliott	Strength of a Woman
"Lie"	2017	Halsey	Hopeless Fountain Kingdom
"Migo Montana"	2017	French Montana	Jungle Rules
"Bambi Too" (Remix)	2017	Jidenna, Maleek Berry, Sarkodie	—N/a
"Keep It 100"	2017	Kid Red, Chris Brown, Takeoff	Red Alert
"Ball Player"	2017	Meek Mill	Wins & Losses
"You Said"	2017	Young Thug	Beautiful Thugger Girls
"Bel Air"	2017	Tyga	BitchImTheShit2
"Ahora Me Llama" (Remix)	2017	Karol G, Bad Bunny	Unstoppable
"Rap Saved Me"	2017	21 Savage, Offset, Metro Boomin	Without Warning
"Pleading the Fifth"	2017	YoungBoy Never Broke Again, Moneybagg Yo	Fed Baby's
"Lost It"	2018	Rich The Kid, Offset	The World Is Yours
"Talk to Me Nice"	2018	Lil Yachty	Lil Boat 2
"Faith"	2018	Nav	Reckless
"Who? What!"	2018	Travis Scott, Takeoff	Astroworld
"Wake Up & Cook Up"	2018	Zaytoven, 2 Chainz	Trapholizay
"F.I.G.H.T"	2018	Mike WiLL Made-It, Eearz, Gucci Mane, YG, Trouble, Juicy J	Credd II: The Album
"Réseaux" (Remix)	2018	Niska, Stefflon Don	—N/a
"Boo'd Up" (Remix)	2018	Ella Mai, Nicki Minaj	—N/a
"Ghostbusters"	2018	Trippie Redd, XXXTentacion, Ski Mask the Slump God	—N/a
"Aries(YuGo) Part 2"	2018	Mike WiLL Made-It, Rae Sremmurd, Big Sean, Pharrell Williams	—N/a
"Try Me" (Remix)	2018	The Weeknd, Swae Lee, Trouble	—N/a
"Tip Toes"	2019	Saweetie	Icy
"Emotional"	2019	Saweetie	Icy
"On Fleek"	2019	Offset	Father of 4
"Too Much Ice"	2019	Lil Pump	Harverd Dropout
"Fuck Up the City"	2019	PNBRock, Mally Mall	TrapStar Turnt PopStar
"Circle of Bosses"	2019	Young Thug	So Much Fun
"Pose to Do"	2019	Lil Pump, French Montana	Non-album song
"Hoop"	2019	French Montana	Montana
"Tony"	2019	Gucci Mane	East Atlanta Santa 3
"Slide"	2019	Gucci Mane	East Atlanta Santa 3
"Bad Moves"	2020	DJ Durel, Rich the Kid	Bad Boys for Life (soundtrack)
"Shake the Room"	2020	Pop Smoke	Meet the Woo 2
"Pick Up"	2020	DaBaby	Blame It on Baby
"Popped"	2020	Trouble	Thug Luv
"Chirp"	2020	Nav	Brown Boy 2
"Aim for the Moon"	2020	Pop Smoke	Shoot for the Stars, Aim for the Moon
"Snitching"	2020	Pop Smoke, Future	Shoot for the Stars, Aim for the Moon
"West Coast Shit"	2020	Pop Smoke, Tyga	Shoot for the Stars, Aim for the Moon
"Let's Build"	2020	Teyana Taylor	The Album
"Freak"	2020	Ty Dolla Sign	Featuring Ty Dolla Sign
"Out In Space"	2020	Wiz Khalifa	The Saga of Wiz Khalifa
"Honorable Mention"	2020	Trippie Redd, Lil Mosey	Pegasus
"Emotional"	2020	Lil Keed	Trapped on Cleveland 3 (Deluxe)
"Wish You Would"	2021	Justin Bieber	Justice (Triple Chucks Deluxe)
"In My Feelings"	2021	Tee Grizzley, Young Dolph	Built for Whatever
"Backdoor"	2021	Pop Smoke, Kodak Black	Faith
"Through the Fire"	2022	Fivio Foreign	B.I.B.L.E.
"Droptop"	2022	French Montana	Montega
"Party"	2022	DJ Khaled, Takeoff	God Did
"Remind 'Em"	2023	Busta Rhymes	Blockbusta
"Paperwork"	2024	¥$ (Kanye West, Ty Dolla Sign)	Vultures 1
"Pa No Pensar"	2024	Peso Pluma	Éxodo
"One of Them Ones"	2024	Mustard, Rob49	Faith of a Mustard Seed
"Keep It Exclusive"	2024	Rich the Kid	Life's a Gamble
"Never Fly Here"	2024	Chief Keef	Almighty So 2
"SlizzyHunchoDon"	2024	Cash Cobain, Don Toliver	Play Cash Cobain
"One in the Head"	2024	21 Lil Harold, G Herbo	Sick of Myself
"Celean"	2024	NoCap	Before I Disappear Again
"When Dey Come"	2024	YTB Fatt	The Richest Foxx
"5brazy (Remix)"	2024	Yeat	Lyfestyle (Digital deluxe exclusive)
"Last Night"	2024	Jason Derulo, Gucci Mane	Nu King
"Spider or Jeffery"	2025	Young Thug	UY Scuti
"Don't Kill the Party"	2025	Ty Dolla Sign, Juicy J	Tycoon
"Mob Guys"	2026	YSL Records, Young Thug, Biggs Money, Lil Unky	Slime Language 3
"Tezzus & Diamond*"	2026	YSL Records, Young Thug, Tezzus & Diamond*, Cash Cobain	Slime Language 3

== Production discography ==
List of producer and songwriting credits (excluding guest appearances, interpolations, and samples)
Track(s)	Year	Credit	Artist(s)	Album
3. "Apeshit"	2018	Songwriter	the Carters	Everything Is Love
2. "She Gon Wink"	2018	Songwriter	Takeoff	The Last Rocket
2. "Money Fight"	2020	Songwriter	City Girls	Various artists – Bad Boys for Life
4. "Sway with Me"	2020	Songwriter	Saweetie, Galxara	Birds of Prey: The Album
5. "Back to Me"	2024	Songwriter	¥$	Vultures 1
8. "Fuk Sumn"	2024	Songwriter	¥$	Vultures 1

== Music videos ==
=== As lead artist ===
List of music videos as lead artist, showing directors
Title	Year	Director(s)
"Shooters Inside My Crib"	2022	Unknown
"Big Stunna" (featuring Takeoff and Birdman)	2022	Unknown
"Nothing Changed" (featuring Takeoff)	2022	Unknown
"Messy" (featuring Takeoff)	2022	Unknown
"Greatness"	2023	Unknown
"Honey Bun"	2023	Unknown
"Turn Yo Clic Up" (featuring Future)	2023	Unknown
"Hold Me"	2023	Unknown
"Disciples"	2023	Unknown
"11.11"	2023	Unknown
"Galaxy"	2023	Unknown
"Wall to Wall"	2023	Unknown
"Real One" (with Rich the Kid)	2024	Unknown

=== As featured artist ===
Music video as featured artist, showing director
Title	Year	Director
"Shmoney" (Bobby Shmurda featuring Quavo and Rowdy Rebel)	2021	Unknown
"5brazy" (Yeat featuring Quavo)	2024	Alex Edep

== Music videos ==
=== As lead artist ===
List of music videos as lead artist, showing directors
Title	Year	Director(s)
"Shooters Inside My Crib"	2022	Unknown
"Big Stunna" (featuring Takeoff and Birdman)	2022	Unknown
"Nothing Changed" (featuring Takeoff)	2022	Unknown
"Messy" (featuring Takeoff)	2022	Unknown
"Greatness"	2023	Unknown
"Honey Bun"	2023	Unknown
"Turn Yo Clic Up" (featuring Future)	2023	Unknown
"Hold Me"	2023	Unknown
"Disciples"	2023	Unknown
"11.11"	2023	Unknown
"Galaxy"	2023	Unknown
"Wall to Wall"	2023	Unknown
"Real One" (with Rich the Kid)	2024	Unknown

=== As featured artist ===
Music video as featured artist, showing director
Title	Year	Director
"Shmoney" (Bobby Shmurda featuring Quavo and Rowdy Rebel)	2021	Unknown
"5brazy" (Yeat featuring Quavo)	2024	Alex Edep

== See also ==
- Migos discography
- Offset discography
- Takeoff discography
