= Moonrock =

Moonrock may refer to:

- Moon rock, rocks from the Moon
- "Moon Rock", a song by Laurel Aitken
- "Moon Rock", a song from Huncho Jack, Jack Huncho by Travis Scott and Quavo
- "Moon Rocks", a song from the Talking Heads album Speaking in Tongues
- Moonrock, a character in the American animated TV series The Pebbles and Bamm-Bamm Show
