= Pass out =

Pass out may refer to:

== Music ==
- "Pass Out" (Tinie Tempah song)
- "Pass Out" (Quavo song)
- "Pass Out", a song by Chris Brown from the album Graffiti

== Other ==
- Syncope (medicine), the act of losing consciousness
- Passing out (military), completing a course by military and other service personnel
- Pass-Out, a drinking board game by Frank Bresee
