= Flip the Switch =

2018 song by Quavo featuring Drake

Song by Quavo featuring Drake

from the album Quavo Huncho
- Released: October 12, 2018
- Length: 2:36
- Label: Capitol; Motown; Quality Control
- Songwriters: Quavious Marshall; Aubrey Graham; Wesley Glass; Kevin Gomringer; Tim Gomringer; Keyshawn Gilmore; Terius Gray; Bryan Thomas
- Producers: Wheezy; Cubeatz; Keyyz (co.)

"Flip the Switch" (stylized in all caps) is a song by American rapper Quavo from his debut studio album Quavo Huncho (2018). It features Canadian rapper Drake and was produced by Wheezy and Cubeatz.

== Background and composition ==
The title of the song is derived from lyrics in Drake's song "Nonstop". Quavo mimics the flow of "Ha" by Juvenile.

== Critical reception ==
Kevin Goddard of HotNewHipHop gave the song a "Very Hottttt" rating. Kassandra Guagliardi of Exclaim! commented the song "wouldn't have been the same without Drizzy's touch". In a review of Quavo Huncho, Paul A. Thompson described Quavo as "making for one of the album's more interesting passages" in regards to his imitation of "Ha". Tommy Monroe of Consequence of Sound considered it an essential track from the album.

== Charts ==
Chart (2018)	Peak position
Canada (Canadian Hot 100)	26
Ireland (IRMA)	76
New Zealand Hot Singles (RMNZ)	7
Switzerland (Schweizer Hitparade)	80
UK Singles (OCC)	55
US Billboard Hot 100	48
US Hot R&B/Hip-Hop Songs (Billboard)	23

== Certifications ==
Region	Certification	Certified units/sales
United States (RIAA)	Gold	500,000^{‡}
^{‡} Sales+streaming figures based on certification alone.
