= Huncho Jack =

American hip hop duo

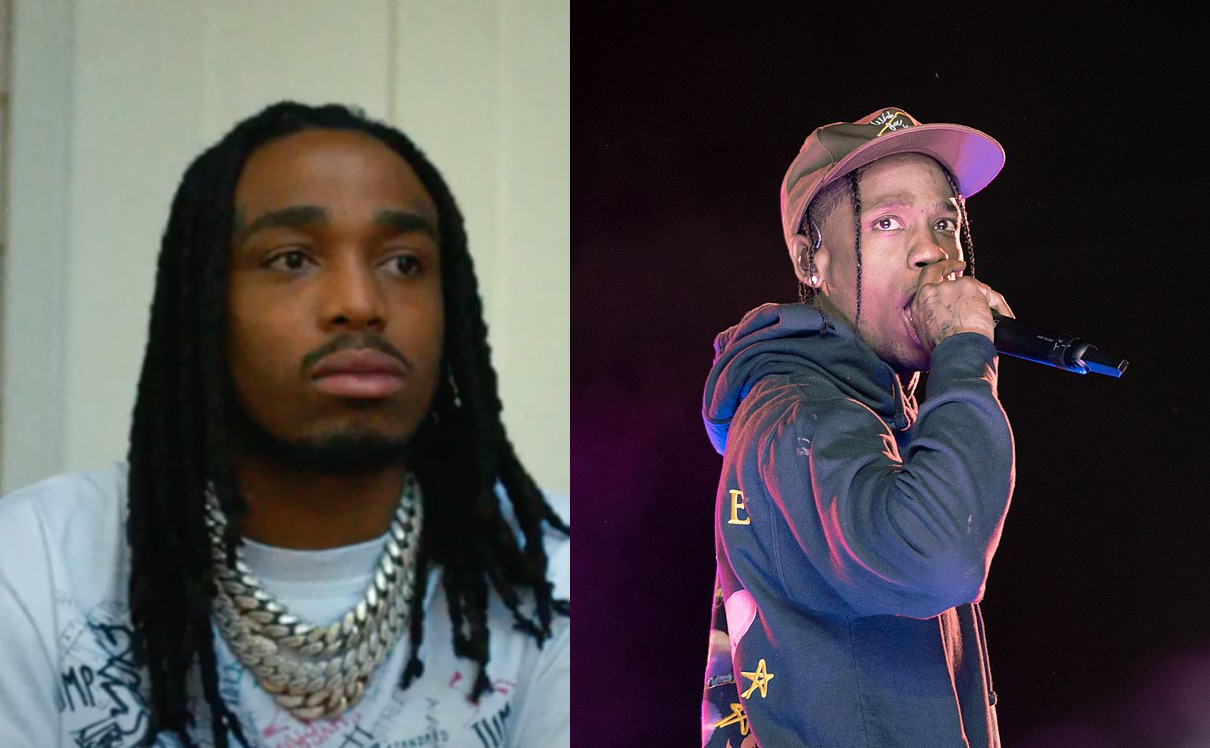
- Quavo (left) and Travis Scott (right)

Background information
- Genres: Hip hop; trap
- Years active: 2016–2017
- Labels: Grand Hustle; Epic; Cactus Jack; Quality Control; Capitol; Motown
- Spinoff of: Migos
- Members: Travis Scott; Quavo

Huncho Jack was an American hip hop superduo composed of rappers Quavo and Travis Scott. The duo released their debut studio album Huncho Jack, Jack Huncho on December 21, 2017, to generally favorable reviews.

== Background ==
The group's name is derived from Quavo's nickname "Huncho" and Travis Scott's record label Cactus Jack Records, which in turn is derived from his legal first name Jacques, which is the French equivalent of Jack in English.

== History ==
=== 2016–2017: Formation and album ===
In December 2016, Quavo announced a collaborative album with Travis Scott on Scott's Apple Music Wav Radio show, previewing numerous recorded tracks. The duo had previously worked together on several tracks; "Sloppy Toppy", "Oh My Dis Side", from Scott's mixtape Days Before Rodeo and debut studio album Rodeo respectively, "Kelly Price" from the Migos album Culture, the Young Thug collaboration "Pick Up the Phone", and appearing as features on Drake's "Portland" from his 2017 mixtape More Life. Speaking to GQ, Scott confirmed: "The Quavo album is coming soon. I'm dropping new music soon. You know how I do it though: I like surprises."

Quavo announced that the group would release their debut album Huncho Jack, Jack Huncho as of 2017. Scott also appeared on an episode of "The Big Talk" where he talks about his relationship with Quavo, in which he says, “He my best friend since day one”.

In an interview with Montreality published on September 18, 2017, Quavo stated that the collaborative album would be released "real soon". He also stated that he and Travis Scott have over 20 records ready. On December 7, 2017, a clip of Quavo being interviewed by Zane Lowe was posted on the official Twitter account for Beats 1. When asked about the title of their upcoming project, he confirmed it would be Huncho Jack, Jack Huncho. The album was released two weeks later on December 21, 2017, for streaming and digital download by Grand Hustle Records, Epic Records, Cactus Jack Records, Quality Control Music, Capitol Records and Motown.

=== 2018–present: Inactivity and teased album sequel ===
Since 2017, no music has been released under the Huncho Jack name. In 2018, Travis Scott featured on Quavo's "Rerun" from the album Quavo Huncho. Five years later, Scott and Quavo featured on Chase B's "Ring Ring" alongside Don Toliver and Ty Dolla Sign. In July 2024, Quavo previewed an unreleased collaboration with Scott and implied that he was open to creating a Huncho Jack sequel if Scott was interested. In April 2025, Quavo again hinted at a potential sequel.

== Discography ==
=== Studio albums ===
Title	Album details	Peak chart positions			
Title	Album details	US	CAN	NZ	UK
Huncho Jack, Jack Huncho	Released: December 21, 2017; Label: Grand Hustle, Epic, Cactus Jack, Quality Control, Capitol, Motown; Formats: LP, digital download	3	6	22	34
