= Pass Out (Quavo song) =

2018 single by Quavo featuring 21 Savage

Single by Quavo featuring 21 Savage

from the album Quavo Huncho
- Released: November 27, 2018
- Genre: Hip hop; trap
- Length: 3:44
- Label: Quality Control; Capitol; Motown
- Songwriters: Quavious Marshall; Shayaa Abraham-Joseph; Tyron Douglas
- Producer: Buddah Bless

Quavo singles chronology
"Bubble Gum" (2018)	"Pass Out" (2018)	"Bacc At It Again" (2019)

21 Savage singles chronology
"Balenciaga" (2018)	"Pass Out" (2018)	"A Lot" (2019)

"Pass Out" is a song by American rapper Quavo featuring British-American rapper 21 Savage. It was released to rhythmic contemporary radio on November 30, 2018 as the lead single from Quavo's debut studio album Quavo Huncho (2018). The song produced by Buddah Bless.

== Critical reception ==
The song received generally mixed reviews from music critics. Neil Z. Yeung of AllMusic considered it a highlight of Quavo Huncho. Kassandra Guagliardi of Exclaim! wrote that Quavo "successfully draws listeners back in with the 21 Savage-assisted "Pass Out," and even though his verse is just okay, it's good to have 21 back." Trey Alston of Revolt called the song the "proletarian cousin of 'Bad and Boujee'" and remarked that 21 Savage's feature "channels what real emotional emptiness looks like, rendering Quavo's boilerplate delivery as emptiness born out of a lack of creativity. It's exhausting, annoying, and the kind of vacuity that brings about headaches when thought about too much." Scott Glaysher of HipHopDX commented that it "open[s] the album with serious firepower", but largely due to Buddah Bless "for going absolutely nuclear with the AirPod rattling production."

== Charts ==
Chart (2018)	Peak position
Canada Hot 100 (Billboard)	56
UK Singles (Official Charts)	94
US Billboard Hot 100	61
US Hot R&B/Hip-Hop Songs (Billboard)	29
