= Sekitō Shigeo =

Japanese electone player

Sekitō Shigeo 関藤繁生 (セキトオ・シゲオ)
- Also known as: 秋篠健 (アキシノ・ケン)
- Born: Japan
- Instruments: Piano, Electone
- Years active: 1975–2021

Sekitō Shigeo (関藤繁生 / セキトオ・シゲオ) was a Japanese Electone player. In the mid-1970s, he recorded a four-LP album set titled Special Sound Series for Nippon Columbia. Sekitō also performed and taught as a pianist under the stage name Akishino Ken (秋篠健 / アキシノ・ケン).

== Biography ==
Sekitō's parents were both primary-school teachers and he has two sisters, both of whom are pianists. Sekitō graduated from Osaka Kyoiku University's Special Music Course Composition Department. Often called a Superstar or Genius of Electone, Shigeo Sekito is widely recognized by the Electone community as specially energetic, gifted and outstanding in playing the Electone. He learned piano in his early childhood, began to compose songs at the age of 17, and majored in composition at Osaka Education College. Later, he was charmed to a new instrument called Electone, which was Yamaha's newly debuted electronic transistor organ. A while later, he made his debut at the 1967 Electone Grand Prix.

Since his debut, Sekitō has applied his talents to Electone as a composer and performer. His style of playing can be described as fresh, energetic, rhythmic and sometimes humorous; this has attracted a growing number of fans and enthusiasts to try and play the instrument too. His venture also brought expectations to develop new possibilities in the Electone world. He has engaged in numerous concerts and recordings, both at home and abroad, practicing up to 14 to 15 hours a day. Sekito's music is what mostly described as "careful as the devil and daring as the angel itself". According to the New Straits Times, Sekitō had released ten albums by 1991 and averaged two concerts per month, using the rest of his time to teach piano to students.

In 1991, Sekitō performed arrangements of works by Mozart and Beethoven on his EL 90 Electone at the World Trade Centre Kuala Lumpur. Sekitō began the concert by playing his own arrangement of the Concierto de Aranjuez by Joaquin Rodrigo. Later, he changed his career into a pianist and changed his name into Akisino Ken (秋篠 健 / アキシノ・ケン).

Sekitō's "The Word II" (1975) inspired Mac DeMarco's "Chamber of Reflection" in his album Salad Days (2013).

Sekitō Shigeo passed away in June 2021 from Colorectal Cancer.

== Discography ==
=== Studio albums ===
- エレクトーン・ファンタスティック！! EX-21のすべて (c. 1960s)
- Special Sound Series Vol. 1 (1975)
- Special Sound Series Vol. 2 (1975)
- Special Sound Series Vol. 3 (1976)
- Special Sound Series Vol. 4 (1977)
- エレクトーンの魅力 - 青い影 / 天使のささやき (1979)
- アーティスティック・エレクトーン Artistic Electone (1985)

=== Compilations ===
- 華麗なるポピュラー・エレクトーン (1986)
- Holiday in Electone by E-3 (Unknown)
