= Huncho Jack, Jack Huncho =

Studio album by Huncho Jack
- Released: December 21, 2017
- Genre: Hip-hop
- Length: 41:34
- Labels: Cactus Jack; Grand Hustle; Quality Control; Epic; Capitol; Motown
- Producers: Buddah Bless; C4; Cardo; Cubeatz; Frank Dukes; Mike Dean; Murda Beatz; Oz; Pas Beatz; Southside; Supah Mario; TM88; Vinylz; Wheezy; Yipsy

Travis Scott chronology
Birds in the Trap Sing McKnight (2016)	Huncho Jack, Jack Huncho (2017)	Astroworld (2018)

Quavo chronology
Huncho Jack, Jack Huncho (2017)	Quavo Huncho (2018)

Huncho Jack, Jack Huncho is the debut studio album by American hip-hop duo Huncho Jack, which consists of rappers Travis Scott and Quavo. The album was released on December 21, 2017, by Cactus Jack Records, Grand Hustle Records, Epic Records, Capitol Records, Motown, and Quality Control Music. It features guest appearances from fellow Migos members, Takeoff and Offset. Production was handled by Murda Beatz, Southside, and Frank Dukes, among others.

Huncho Jack, Jack Huncho charted at number three on the US Billboard 200, and received generally favorable reviews from critics.

== Background ==
In December 2016, Quavo announced the collaborative album on Travis Scott's Apple Music Wav Radio show, previewing numerous recorded tracks. On April 3, 2017, it was further reported Scott had been working on a collaborative album with Atlanta-based rapper Quavo of Migos, with whom he previously worked with on the track "Oh My Dis Side" and the Young Thug collaboration "Pick Up the Phone". Speaking to GQ, he confirmed: "The Quavo album is coming soon. I'm dropping new music soon. You know how I do it though: I like surprises."

In an interview with Montreality published on September 18, 2017, Quavo stated that the collaborative album would be released "real soon". He also stated that he and Travis Scott have over 20 records ready. On December 7, 2017, a clip of Quavo being interviewed by Zane Lowe was posted on the official Twitter account for Beats 1. When asked about the title of their upcoming project, he confirmed it would be Huncho Jack, Jack Huncho.

== Promotion ==
The artists teased the album in a series of tweets throughout 2017. The day before release a promotional poster for the album was spotted in New York City, followed by Quavo and Travis Scott posting cryptic messages to their social media before announcing that they were releasing Huncho Jack, Jack Huncho on December 22, 2017. The album's cover art and track listing was unveiled soon after. The album's artwork was illustrated by Ralph Steadman.

The music video for "Black & Chinese" was released on April 23, 2018.

== Critical reception ==
Professional ratings
Aggregate scores
Source	Rating
Metacritic	66/100
Review scores
Source	Rating
AllMusic	2/5 stars
Consequence	B−
The Guardian	3/5 stars
HipHopDX	3.4/5
HotNewHipHop	75%
Pitchfork	6.3/10
Spectrum Culture	2.75/5 stars
Sputnikmusic	3.0/5

Huncho Jack, Jack Huncho was met with generally favorable reviews. At Metacritic, which assigns a normalized rating out of 100 to reviews from professional publications, the album received an average score of 66, based on six reviews.

Brian Josephs of Pitchfork commended the album's exciting production, but criticized the performances of the artists: "But like any Travis Scott album, it's the sterling production that carries the project. The beats are as elegant as they are variegated. In a fatal irony, Huncho Jack's liveliness tends to come from everywhere except Quavo and Travis Scott. The protean energy that buoy their respective works are sadly absent." Aaron McKrell of HipHopDX stated that Huncho Jack, Jack Huncho is "an album that basks in each artists' signature sound to the benefit of its groove and detriment of its creativity" and "further proves the duo's strength is entertainment on cruise control".

Greg Whitt of Consequence said, "There is no palpable effort or discomfort on Huncho Jack, Jack Huncho, resulting in a perfectly fine album that no one will remember next year or maybe even next month". In a mixed review, The Guardian's Ben Beaumont-Thomas stated: "Their often magnetic signature styles veer close to gimmickry here. ... But the production props them up strongly." In another mixed review, Sputnikmusic's Arcade stated: "A competent collaborative tape that nevertheless proves that Quavo should stick to Migos and Travis to curating his own albums."

== Commercial performance ==
Huncho Jack, Jack Huncho debuted at number three on the US Billboard 200 with 90,000 album-equivalent units, of which 17,000 were pure album sales. It is Scott's third album to reach the top 10, and Quavo's first as a solo artist. The album was the duo's first number one on the US Top R&B/Hip-Hop Albums chart.

== Track listing ==
Huncho Jack, Jack Huncho track listing
No.	Title	Writer(s)	Producer(s)	Length
1.	"Modern Slavery"	Jacques Webster II; Quavious Marshall; Tyron Douglas; Jay Walker; Edward Thomas; Jerry Butler, Jr.	Buddah Bless	2:29
2.	"Black & Chinese"	Webster; Marshall; Joshua Luellen	Southside	2:52
3.	"Eye 2 Eye" (featuring Takeoff)	Webster; Marshall; Kirshnik Ball; Shane Lindstrom; Donald Paton	Murda Beatz; Felix Leone^{[b]}	3:11
4.	"Motorcycle Patches"	Webster; Marshall; Luellen; Bryan Simmons; Jonathan Priester; Adam Feeney	Southside; TM88; Supah Mario; Frank Dukes	3:11
5.	"Huncho Jack"	Webster; Marshall; Lindstrom; Ramon Ibanga, Jr.; Michael "Mike" Dean	Murda Beatz; Illmind^{[a]}; Dean^{[b]}	3:19
6.	"Saint"	Webster; Marshall; Lindstrom; Ibanga, Jr.	Murda Beatz; Illmind^{[a]}	2:21
7.	"Go"	Webster; Marshall; Anderson Hernandez; Kevin Gomringer; Tim Gomringer; Allen Ritter	Vinylz; Cubeatz; Ritter^{[b]}	2:37
8.	"Dubai Shit" (featuring Offset)	Webster; Marshall; Kiari Cephus; Hernandez; Ozan Yildirim; Carl-Mikael Berlander; Jonatan Håstad	Vinylz; Oz; Yung Gud^{[b]}; Yung Lean^{[b]}	3:48
9.	"Saint Laurent Mask"	Webster; Marshall; Douglas; Dean	Buddah Bless; Dean	3:10
10.	"Moon Rock"	Webster; Marshall; Hernandez; K. Gomringer; T. Gomringer; Ritter	Vinylz; Cubeatz; Ritter^{[b]}	2:31
11.	"How U Feel"	Webster; Marshall; Pascal Leroy; Carl "Carlos" Desrosiers; Shigeo Sekito	Pas Beatz; Yipsy; Desrosiers^{[b]}	3:26
12.	"Where U From"	Webster; Marshall; Ronald LaTour; K. Gomringer; T. Gomringer; Brock Korsan	Cardo; Cubeatz	4:12
13.	"Best Man"	Webster; Marshall; Dean; Wesley Glass; Rodrequez Yancy; David Cunningham	Wheezy; C4; Dean^{[b]}	4:27
Total length:				41:34

Notes

- ^{^[a]} signifies a co-producer
- ^{^[b]} signifies an additional producer

Sample credits

- "Modern Slavery" contains a sample of "Cigarettes and Coffee", performed by Otis Redding.
- "How U Feel" contains a sample of "The Word II", performed by Shigeo Sekito.

== Personnel ==
Credits adapted from Tidal.

Performers

- Travis Scott – primary artist
- Quavo – primary artist
- Takeoff – featured artist (track 3)
- Offset – featured artist (track 8)
- Yung Lean – additional vocals (track 8)

Technical

- Mike Dean – mastering engineer (all tracks), mixer (all tracks)
- Quavo – engineer (all tracks)
- Travis Scott – engineer (all tracks)
- Zach Steele – engineer tracks 1–4, 12)
- Jimmy Lepe – engineer (tracks 1–5, 8, 9, 12)
- DJ Durel – engineer (tracks 1–7, 9–13)
- Meeboob – assistant mixer (all tracks)
- Sean Solymar – assistant mixer (all tracks)
- Jess Jackson – engineer (tracks 5, 6, 13)

Additional personnel

- Ralph Steadman – cover artist

Production

- Buddah Bless – producer (tracks 1, 9)
- Southside – producer (tracks 2, 4)
- Murda Beatz – producer (tracks 3, 5, 6)
- Felix Leone – additional producer (track 3)
- TM88 – producer (track 4)
- Supah Mario – producer (track 4)
- Frank Dukes – producer (track 4)
- Mike Dean – co-producer (tracks 5, 9, 13)
- Illmind – co-producer (tracks 5, 6)
- Allen Ritter – additional producer (tracks 7, 10)
- Vinylz – producer (tracks 7, 8, 10)
- Cubeatz – producer (tracks 7, 10, 12)
- Yung Gud – additional producer (track 8)
- Yung Lean – additional producer (track 8)
- Oz – producer (track 8)
- Pas Beatz – producer (track 11)
- Yipsy – producer (track 11)
- Carlos Desrosiers – additional producer (track 11)
- C4 – producer (track 13)
- Cardo – producer (track 12)
- Wheezy – producer (track 13)

== Charts ==
=== Weekly charts ===
Chart performance for Huncho Jack, Jack Huncho
Chart (2017–2018)	Peak position
Belgian Albums (Ultratop Flanders)	54
Belgian Albums (Ultratop Wallonia)	123
Canadian Albums (Billboard)	6
Danish Albums (Hitlisten)	9
Dutch Albums (Album Top 100)	15
Finnish Albums (Suomen virallinen lista)	38
German Albums (Offizielle Top 100)	33
Italian Albums (FIMI)	67
Latvian Albums (LaIPA)	11
New Zealand Albums (RMNZ)	22
Norwegian Albums (VG-lista)	12
Swedish Albums (Sverigetopplistan)	17
Swiss Albums (Schweizer Hitparade)	41
UK Albums (Official Charts)	34
US Billboard 200	3
US Top R&B/Hip-Hop Albums (Billboard)	1

=== Year-end charts ===
2018 year-end chart performance for Huncho Jack, Jack Huncho
Chart (2018)	Position
Icelandic Albums (Plötutíóindi)	82
US Billboard 200	97
US Top R&B/Hip-Hop Albums (Billboard)	45

== Certifications ==
Certifications for Huncho Jack, Jack Huncho
Region	Certification	Certified units/sales
Denmark (IFPI Danmark)	Gold	10,000^{‡}
United Kingdom (BPI)	Silver	60,000^{‡}
^{‡} Sales+streaming figures based on certification alone.
