= Workin Me =

2018 single by Quavo

Single by Quavo

from the album Quavo Huncho
- Released: August 10, 2018
- Genre: Hip hop; trap
- Length: 2:49
- Label: Quality Control; Motown; Capitol
- Songwriters: Quavious Marshall; Shane Lindstrom; Rasool Diaz
- Producers: Murda Beatz; Sool Got Hits; Joseph L'Étranger

Quavo singles chronology
| "No Brainer" (2018) | "Workin Me" (2018) | "Lamb Talk" (2018) |

Music video
- "WORKIN ME" on YouTube

"Workin Me" (stylized in all caps) is a song by American rapper Quavo from his debut solo and second overall studio album Quavo Huncho (2018). It was released on August 10, 2018 as the lead single from the record, alongside the singles "Lamb Talk" and "Bubble Gum".

== Critical reception ==
In a review of Quavo Huncho, Kassandra Guagliardi of Exclaim! called it "one of the few tracks where Quavo holds his own without any features." Luke Fox of XXL put it alongside "Bubble Gum" and "Big Bro" as part of the album's "easily forgettable filler".

== Music video ==
The music video was released on August 22, 2018, via Migos' YouTube channel Migos ATL. It was directed by Quavo, Joseph DeRosiers Jr. and Edgar Esteves. The visual starts off at a mobster's mansion, where Quavo is having a discussion about loyalty with his mob boss while they are playing pool. As the boss's niece, played by Quavo's then-girlfriend Saweetie, walks to them, Quavo keeps his eyes on her. However, the boss threatens his life if he ever pursues her. After Quavo ignores the threats, he and Saweetie are kidnapped by the mob boss, who ends up getting killed by his own security guard.

== Commercial performance ==
On the week of August 25, 2018, "Workin Me" debuted at number 72 on the Billboard Hot 100. It peaked at number 52 the week of September 8, and stayed on the chart for fifteen weeks. That same week, the song debuted at number 32 on the Streaming Songs chart (with 13.1 million streams), giving Quavo his first solo single to appear on that chart after 19 previous appearances as a part of Migos. It was certified platinum by the RIAA in the US on August 21, 2019. In Canada, the track debuted at number 79 on the Canadian Hot 100 the same week it first appeared on the Billboard Hot 100. Two weeks later, it peaked at number 48 the week of September 8, and left the chart. It reappeared at number 60 the week of October 27, and remained on the chart for ten weeks.

== Charts ==
| Chart (2018) | Peak position |
|---|---|
| Canada Hot 100 (Billboard) | 48 |
| US Billboard Hot 100 | 52 |
| US Hot R&B/Hip-Hop Songs (Billboard) | 18 |

== Certifications ==
| Region | Certification | Certified units/sales |
|---|---|---|
| United States (RIAA) | Platinum | 1,000,000^{‡} |
^{‡} Sales+streaming figures based on certification alone.
