= Quavo Huncho =

Studio album by Quavo
- Released: October 12, 2018
- Genre: Trap
- Length: 66:18
- Label: Quality Control; Capitol; Motown
- Producer: Quavo; 30 Roc; Budda Beats; Buddah Bless; Cubeatz; Dun Deal; Earl the Pearll; G Koop; Ikaz Boi; Jaded; Joseph DaVinci; Joseph L'Étranger; Keyyz; Kid Cudi; Mike Almighty; Murda Beatz; OG Parker; Pharrell Williams; Smokescreen; Tay Keith; Tee Romano; Travis Scott; Vance Burdge; Wheezy; WondaGurl

Quavo chronology
Huncho Jack, Jack Huncho (2017)	Quavo Huncho (2018)	Only Built for Infinity Links (2022)

Singles from Quavo Huncho
- 1. "Workin Me" Released: August 10, 2018; 2. "Lamb Talk" Released: August 10, 2018; 3. "Bubble Gum" Released: August 10, 2018; 4. "Pass Out" Released: November 27, 2018

Quavo Huncho is the debut studio album by American rapper Quavo. It was released on October 12, 2018, by Quality Control Music, Capitol Records and Motown. The album features guest appearances from fellow Migos members Takeoff and Offset, as well as 21 Savage, Drake, Saweetie, Madonna, Cardi B, Lil Baby, Travis Scott, Normani, Davido, and Kid Cudi. Quavo Huncho was preceded by three singles: "Workin Me", "Lamb Talk" and "Bubble Gum"; it spawned the single "Pass Out" featuring 21 Savage.

== Critical reception ==
Professional ratings
Aggregate scores
Source	Rating
Metacritic	60/100
Review scores
Source	Rating
AllMusic	3/5 stars
Consequence of Sound	C
Exclaim!	6/10
Highsnobiety	2.0/5
HipHopDX	3.3/5
Pitchfork	5.9/10
XXL	4/5

Quavo Huncho received generally mixed reviews from music critics. In one review, Neil Yeung of AllMusic believed Quavo Huncho "struggles to maintain momentum. Like many contemporaries, the album is overly bloated – designed for high streaming counts – and could use some trimming. With a mostly forgettable first half and a strong second half, sharper attention to editing could have made this a stronger album. Otherwise, Quavo Huncho is enjoyable but unmemorable. It's not quite a Migos album, but it comes close enough to tide fans over until album number four." Paul Thompson of Pitchfork concluded that Quavo Huncho is "flat and nearly anonymous", consisting of "passable, professional songs that are barely moving and pale when compared to nearly any full-length Migos record." Thompson added that the album is "so ordinary, so uniquely uninspiring that it makes it difficult to imagine a solo work from Quavo that would truly grip our attention." Kassandra Guagliardi of Exclaim! concluded that "By the end of the project, Quavo Huncho begins to feel more like a mixtape, with Quavo popping out to add a few unenergetic verses and repetitive adlibs rather than a strong solo debut. Quavo Huncho's individual features provide more of a draw than every solo track combined, proving that Quavo still needs some time to grow and develop as a solo artist." Thomas Hobbs of Highsnobiety complimented the album's production and guest appearances but criticised Quavo's performance and lyricism: "The reality could be that we're starting to suffer from Migos fatigue; the group's reliance on trap beats and repetitive, catchy hooks is starting to feel more and more one note. Quavo Huncho serves as a warning that the group must start to show more development in their sound or risk alienating rap fans, who might be getting bored with their sole formula."

Quavo admitted in a 2020 interview that he felt that he could have produced a better album: “I tried to club too much on my album, and I didn't give them nothing personal,” [...] "If I would've went a little personal, I think my album would have been a little bit better.”

== Commercial performance ==
Quavo Huncho initially debuted at number 66 on the US Billboard 200 with sales from less than a day of activity. In its second week, the album ascended to number two the following week after a full week of tracking, which included 99,000 album-equivalent units (of which 6,000 came from pure album sales). In its third week, the album dropped to number eleven on the chart, earning an additional 40,000 units. In the fourth week, the album dropped to number 16 on the chart, earning another 27,000 units. On August 19, 2019, the album was certified gold by Recording Industry Association of America (RIAA) for combined sales and album-equivalent units of over 500,000 units in the United States.

== Track listing ==
Quavo Huncho track listing
No.	Title	Writer(s)	Producer(s)	Length
1.	"Biggest Alley Oop"	Quavious Marshall; Samuel Gloade; Kevin Gomringer; Tim Gomringer	30 Roc; Cubeatz	3:00
2.	"Pass Out" (featuring 21 Savage)	Marshall; Shayaa Abraham-Joseph; Tyron Douglas	Buddah Bless	3:44
3.	"Huncho Dreams"	Marshall; Shane Lindstrom; Matthew McQueen; Nasir Moore; Aubrey Graham; Caresha Brownlee; Dwayne Carter, Jr.; Sandra Gale; Stephen Garrett; Darius Harrison; Jatavia Johnson; Renetta Lowe; Adam Piggot; James Scheffer; Noah Shebib; Benjamin Worksman; Rex Zamor; Orvill Hall; Philip Price; Tina Gordon Chism	Murda Beatz; Smokescreen; Nas Moore^{[a]}	3:31
4.	"Flip the Switch" (featuring Drake)	Marshall; Graham; Wesley Glass; K. Gomringer; T. Gomringer; Keyshawn Gilmore; Terius Gray; Bryan Thomas	Wheezy; Cubeatz; Keyyz^{[d]}	2:36
5.	"Give It to Em" (featuring Saweetie)	Marshall; Diamonté Harper; Zachary Thomas	Budda Beats	3:02
6.	"Shine"	Marshall; Brytavoius Chambers	Tay Keith	2:43
7.	"Workin Me"	Marshall; Lindstrom; Rasool Diaz	Murda Beatz; Sool Got Hits^{[b]}; Joseph L'Étranger^{[d]}	2:49
8.	"How Bout That?"	Marshall; Joshua Parker; Terence Williams	OG Parker; Tee Romano	2:40
9.	"Champagne Rosé" (featuring Madonna and Cardi B)	Marshall; Madonna Louise Ciccone; Belcalis Almánzar; Lindstrom; Diaz	Murda Beatz; Quavo^{[a]}; Sool Got Hits^{[b]}	4:06
10.	"Keep That Shit" (featuring Takeoff)	Marshall; Kirshnik Ball; David Cunningham	Dun Deal	2:56
11.	"Fuck 12" (featuring Offset)	Marshall; Kiari Cephus; Earl Isaac Bynum; K. Gomringer; T. Gomringer	Earl the Pearll; Cubeatz; Divashen Govender(DVA)	4:24
12.	"Lose It" (featuring Lil Baby)	Marshall; Dominique Jones; Brandon Swandal; Vance Burdge, Jr.	Jaded; Vance Burdge	3:57
13.	"Rerun" (featuring Travis Scott)	Marshall; Jacques Webster II; Ebony Oshunrinde; Zaki Ghafir	WondaGurl; Ikaz Boi	3:56
14.	"Go All the Way"	Marshall; Pharrell Williams	Williams	3:16
15.	"Lamb Talk"	Marshall; Douglas	Buddah Bless; Quavo^{[a]}	2:52
16.	"Big Bro"	Marshall; Cunningham; Christopher Williams-Green	Dun Deal; Chriz Beatz^{[b]}	3:36
17.	"Swing" (featuring Normani and Davido)	Marshall; Normani Kordei Hamilton; David Adedeji Adeleke; Lindstrom; Robert Mandell; Taylor Parks; Rachel Keen	Murda Beatz; G Koop; French Montana^{[b]}; Tayla Parx^{[c]}; Victoria Monét^{[c]}	5:03
18.	"Bubble Gum"	Marshall; Douglas; Charles Smith; Joseph Smith; Kenneth Gamble; Leon Huff	Buddah Bless; Smith Bros.^{[b]}	3:16
19.	"Lost" (featuring Kid Cudi)	Marshall; Scott Mescudi; Santiago Joseph Juan-Carlos Rodriguez; Lorenzo Gibson-Mills; Oladipo Omishore	Joseph DaVinci; Mike Almighty; Travis Scott; Kid Cudi; Quavo	4:38
Total length:				66:18

Notes

- All tracks are stylized in uppercase.
- ^{^[a]} signifies a co-producer
- ^{^[b]} signifies an additional producer
- ^{^[c]} signifies a vocal producer
- ^{^[d]} signifies an uncredited co-producer

Sample credits

- "Huncho Dreams" contains samples from "In My Feelings" performed by Drake.

== Personnel ==
Performers

- Quavo – primary artist
- 21 Savage – featured artist (track 2)
- Drake – featured artist (track 4)
- Saweetie – featured artist (track 5)
- Madonna – featured artist (track 9)
- Cardi B – featured artist (track 9)
- Takeoff – featured artist (track 10)
- Offset – featured artist (track 11)
- Lil Baby – featured artist (track 12)
- Travis Scott – featured artist (track 13)
- Normani – featured artist (track 17)
- Davido – featured artist (track 17)
- Kid Cudi – featured artist (track 19)

Technical

- Colin Leonard – mastering engineer (all tracks)
- Thomas "Tillie" Mann – mixing engineer (tracks 1–12, 15–19)
- Quavo – recording engineer (tracks 1–6, 8–15, 16–17, 19)
- Mike Dean – mixing engineer (track 13)
- Leslie Brathwaite – mixing engineer (track 14)
- Tim Mclain – recording engineer (track 17)
- Nagaris Johnson – assistant recording engineer (track 17)
- John "Kash" Brown – assistant recording engineer (track 17)
- Princeston "Perfect Harmany" Terry – assistant mixer (tracks 1–6, 8–15, 16–17, 19)
- DJ Durel – assistant mixer (tracks 7, 15, 18)

Production

- 30 Roc – producer (track 1)
- Cubeatz – producer (track 1, 4, 11)
- Buddah Bless – producer (track 2, 15, 18)
- Murda Beatz – producer (track 3, 7, 9, 17)
- Smokescreen – producer (track 3)
- Nas Moore – additional producer (track 3)
- Wheezy – producer (track 4)
- Keyyz – producer (track 4)
- Budda Beats – producer (track 5)
- Tay Keith – producer (track 6)
- Sool Got Hits – additional producer (track 7)
- OG Parker – producer (track 7)
- Tee Romano – producer (track 7)
- Quavo – co-producer (track 9, 15), producer (tracks 19)
- Dun Deal – producer (track 10)
- Earl the Pearll – producer (track 11)
- Jaded– producer (track 12)
- Vance Burdge– producer (track 12)
- Ikaz Boi – producer (track 13)
- Wondagurl – producer (track 13)
- Pharrell Williams – producer (track 14)
- Chriz Beatz – additional producer (tracks 16)
- G Koop – producer (track 17)
- French Montana – additional producer (track 17)
- Tayla Parx – vocal producer (track 17)
- Victoria Monét – vocal producer (track 17)
- Smith Bros. – additional producer (track 18)
- Joseph Davinci – producer (track 19)
- Mike Almighty – producer (track 19)
- Kid Cudi – producer (track 19)

Additional personnel

- Mihailo Andic – artwork

== Charts ==
=== Weekly charts ===
Weekly chart performance for Quavo Huncho
Chart (2018)	Peak position
Australian Albums (ARIA)	16
Austrian Albums (Ö3 Austria)	26
Belgian Albums (Ultratop Flanders)	23
Belgian Albums (Ultratop Wallonia)	47
Canadian Albums (Billboard)	2
Danish Albums (Hitlisten)	15
Dutch Albums (Album Top 100)	12
Finnish Albums (Suomen virallinen lista)	48
German Albums (Offizielle Top 100)	46
Irish Albums (IRMA)	18
Italian Albums (FIMI)	22
New Zealand Albums (RMNZ)	13
Norwegian Albums (VG-lista)	6
Swedish Albums (Sverigetopplistan)	19
Swiss Albums (Schweizer Hitparade)	9
UK Albums (OCC)	16
US Billboard 200	2
US Top R&B/Hip-Hop Albums (Billboard)	1

=== Year-end charts ===
2018 year-end chart performance for Quavo Huncho
Chart (2018)	Position
US Billboard 200	192
US Top R&B/Hip-Hop Albums (Billboard)	68

2019 year-end chart performance for Quavo Huncho
Chart (2019)	Position
US Top R&B/Hip-Hop Albums (Billboard)	99

== Certifications ==
Certifications for Quavo Huncho
Region	Certification	Certified units/sales
United States (RIAA)	Gold	500,000^{‡}
^{‡} Sales+streaming figures based on certification alone.

== Release history ==
Release history for Quavo Huncho
Region	Date	Format(s)	Label
Various	October 11, 2018	Digital download; streaming	Quality Control Music
Various	November 2, 2018	CD	Quality Control Music
Various	February 22, 2019	LP	Quality Control Music
