= Quavo =

American rapper (born 1991)

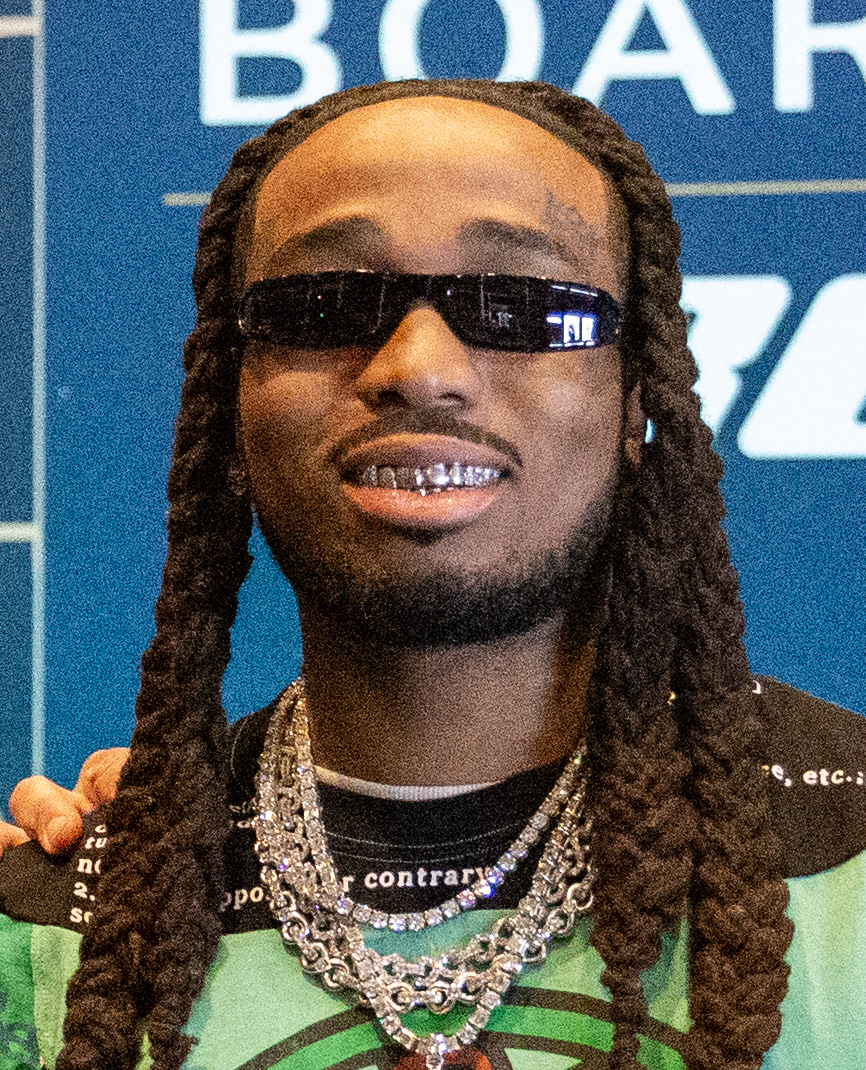
- Quavo in 2025

Background information
- Also known as: Huncho; Quavo Stuntin
- Born: Quavious Keyate Marshall; April 2, 1991 (age 35); Athens, Georgia, U.S.
- Origin: Lawrenceville, Georgia, U.S.
- Genre: Hip-hop
- Occupations: Rapper; singer; songwriter; record producer; actor
- Works: Discography; filmography
- Years active: 2008–present
- Labels: Quality Control; Motown; Capitol
- Member of: Huncho Jack; Migos
- Formerly of: Unc & Phew
- Relatives: Takeoff (nephew)
- Website: quavohuncho.net

- Football career

Glacier Boyz
- Title: Owner

Career information
- High school: Berkmar High School

Career history
- FCF Glacier Boyz (2022–present) Owner

Quavious Keyate Marshall (born April 2, 1991), better known by his stage name Quavo (/ˈkweɪvoʊ/ KWAY-voh), is an American rapper and record producer. He is the frontman of the hip-hop trio Migos. Formed with Takeoff and their mutual friend Offset in 2008, the group released four commercially successful studio albums before disbanding a year after Takeoff’s tragic passing in 2022 and reuniting in 2026.

As a solo act, Marshall has guest performed on six Billboard Hot 100 top ten singles: Post Malone's diamond-certified "Congratulations", Justin Bieber's "Intentions", Liam Payne's "Strip That Down", Drake's "Portland", and DJ Khaled's "No Brainer" and "I'm the One", the latter of which peaked atop the chart. His debut studio album, Quavo Huncho (2018), peaked at number two on the Billboard 200 and spawned the platinum-certified single "Workin Me". His second album, Rocket Power (2023), peaked at number 18 and was released in memory of Takeoff, who was fatally shot the year prior.

== Early life ==
Quavious Keyate Marshall was born on April 2, 1991, in Athens, Georgia. His father died when Marshall was five years old. He has an older sister, Karasha Marshall. The three members of Migos grew up together in Gwinnett County, a mostly suburban area 20–30 minutes northeast of Atlanta. Quavo attended Berkmar High School and was the starting quarterback of its football team during the 2009 season, his senior year. Berkmar went 1–9 in the 2009 season, and Quavo went 19-of-25 for 201 yards and three touchdowns for the first win of the season. Quavo previously held the Georgia High School record by completing 28 passes in a game in 2009 until being surpassed by Taylor Heinicke. Despite finishing the football season for his senior year, Quavo dropped out of Berkmar months before graduation.

== Career ==
Migos was formed in 2008 by Quavo and fellow rappers Takeoff and Offset. Quavo and Takeoff are directly related and were raised together by Quavo's mother. Quavo was Takeoff's uncle. The group was originally known as Polo Club and is from Lawrenceville, Georgia. They changed their name to "Migos" after deciding Polo Club was too generic. The group released their first full-length project, a mixtape titled Juug Season, on August 25, 2011. They followed with the mixtape No Label, on June 1, 2012.

Migos rose to prominence in 2013 after the release of their single "Versace". The song was remixed by Canadian rapper Drake, peaking at number 99 on the Billboard Hot 100 chart and number 31 on the Hot R&B/Hip-Hop Songs. Quavo had his first lead single as a solo artist with the song "Champions" featuring several other artists. The song peaked at number 71 on the Billboard Hot 100.

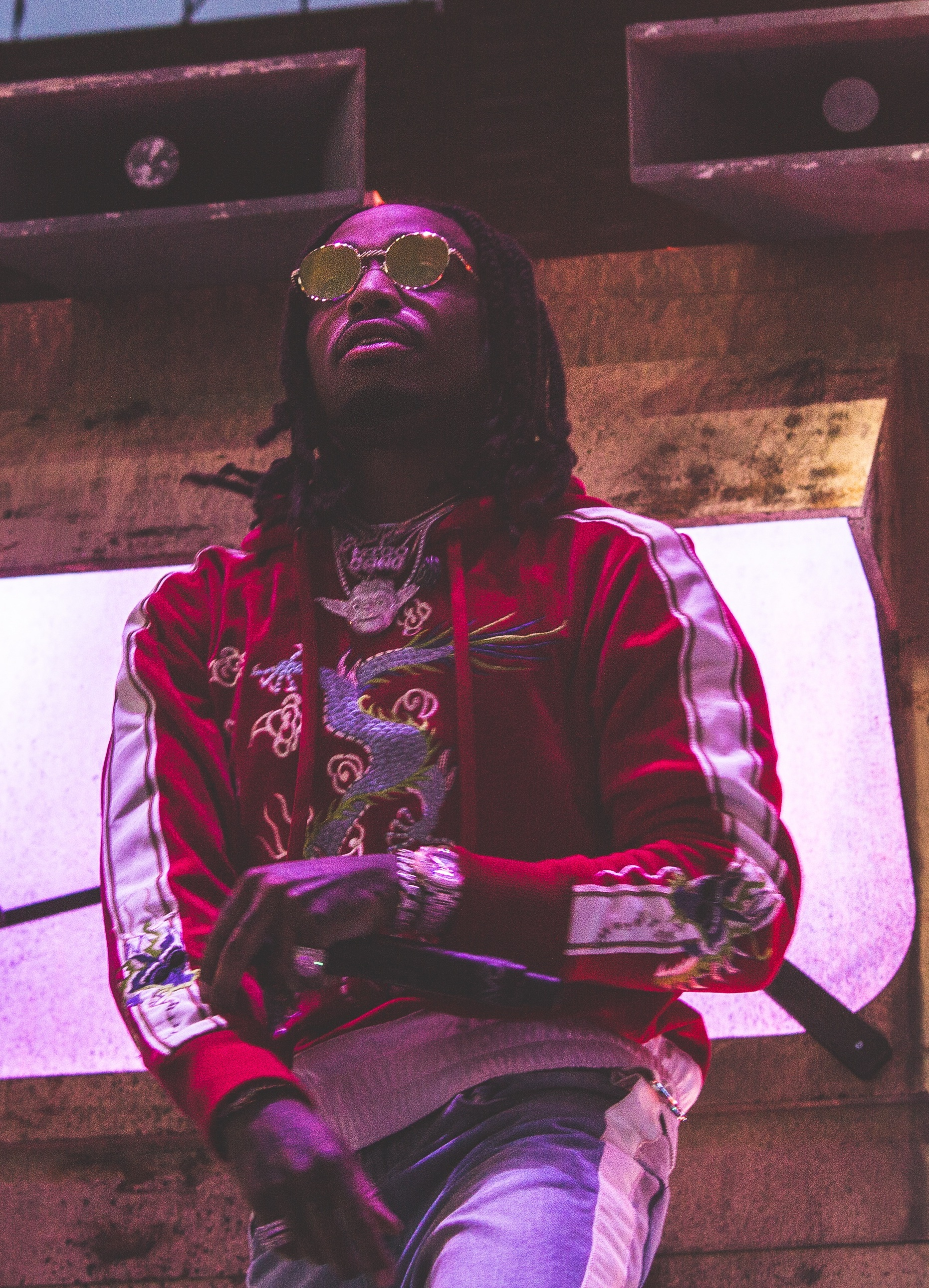
Quavo performing at the VELD Music Festival in 2017

After the success of Migos' second studio album Culture, which reached number one on the US Billboard 200 chart, Quavo was subsequently featured on several popular songs outside of Migos, including "Congratulations", "I'm the One", "Portland" and "No Brainer". In an interview with GQ, Houston-based rapper Travis Scott, with whom Quavo previously worked on the Young Thug collaboration "Pick Up the Phone", revealed he had a collaborative album with Quavo in the works.

In April 2017, Quavo was featured on The Fate of the Furious: The Album on the song "Go Off" with Lil Uzi Vert and Travis Scott. The song was eventually certified Gold by the RIAA. Quavo also released "Ice Tray" with Lil Yachty on December 14, 2017. The song peaked at number 74 on the Billboard Hot 100.

On December 21, 2017, Quavo announced that he would release Huncho Jack, Jack Huncho with Travis Scott on December 22, 2017, without any prior promotion. The album debuted at number 3 on the Billboard 200 and had seven tracks chart on the Billboard Hot 100.

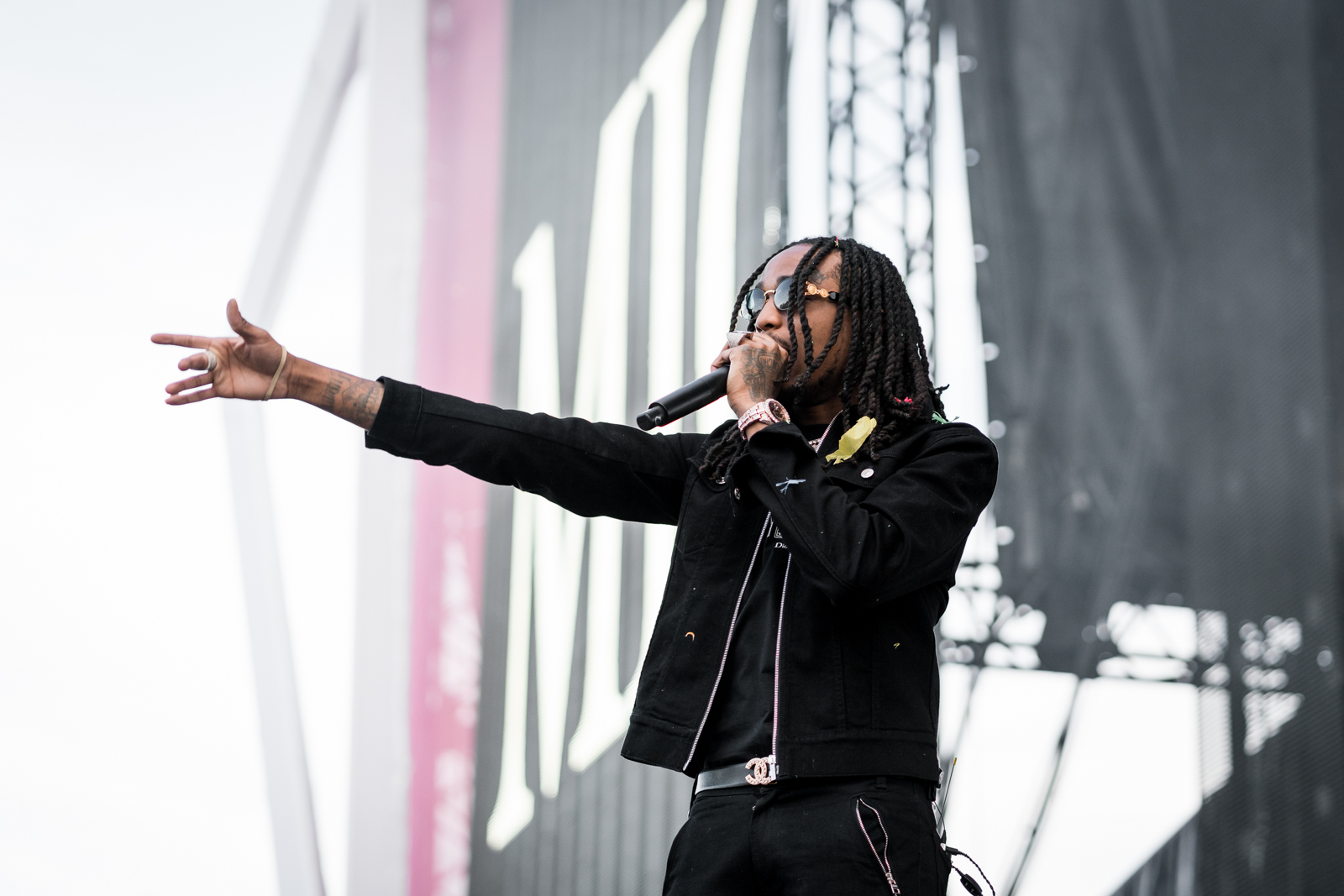
Quavo performing in 2018

On January 26, 2018, Migos released Culture II. Following this, Quavo announced an upcoming solo project titled Quavo Huncho to be released in October. It was supported by three singles, "Workin Me", "Lamb Talk" and "Bubble Gum", with "Workin Me" peaking at 52 on the Billboard Hot 100, becoming Quavo's highest-charting single as a solo artist. The album was released on October 12, 2018, through Capitol Records, Motown, and Quality Control Music and features guest appearances from 21 Savage, Drake, Saweetie, Madonna, Cardi B, Lil Baby, Travis Scott, Normani, Davido, and Kid Cudi.

On May 18, 2019, Quavo performed "Future" alongside Madonna at the grand final of the Eurovision Song Contest 2019. On February 7, 2020, Quavo was featured on the song "Intentions" from Justin Bieber's fifth studio album Changes. The song peaked at number five on the Billboard Hot 100. In the following year, Migos released their fourth album, Culture III.

In October 2022, a possible disbandment of Migos became the subject of speculation based on reports that Quavo's ex-girlfriend Saweetie had slept with Offset. Following this, Quavo and Takeoff formed a super duo, Unc & Phew and went on to release a collaborative album titled Only Built for Infinity Links on October 7, 2022, without Offset's input. During an interview with the Big Facts podcast, Quavo stated that he would like to see his and Takeoff's career "as a duo".

On November 1, 2022, less than a month after the release of the duo's first album, Takeoff was shot and killed while with Quavo and others at the 810 Billiards & Bowling in Houston, Texas.

In early 2023, Quavo released three singles, "Honey Bun", "Greatness" and "Without You", dedicated to Takeoff before announcing his second studio album Rocket Power, released on August 18, 2023. The album was preceded by the hit single "Turn Yo Clic Up" featuring Future and peaked at number 18 on the US Billboard 200 chart.

On April 11, 2024, singer Chris Brown released the deluxe edition of his eleventh studio album 11:11, directly dissing Quavo on the track "Freak". Quavo responded the following day with "Tender", leading Brown to respond the following week with the release of "Weakest Link". "Weakest Link" received universal acclaim from critics and general public. Quavo responded three days later with "Over Hoes & Bitches", featuring a posthumous appearance by Takeoff, receiving a mixed reaction from the public.

On June 19, 2024, American singer Lana Del Rey posted a 21-second long preview of her new song "Tough" along with Quavo on Instagram. The song was released on July 3, 2024, accompanied by a music video.

== Other ventures ==
=== Acting ===
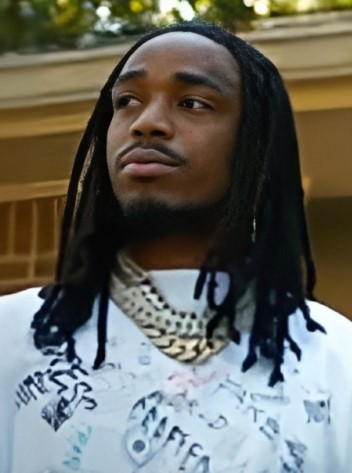
Quavo in 2019

Quavo along with the members of Migos made his TV debut after an appearance on an episode of Donald Glover's series Atlanta. The episode aired on September 13, 2016, under the title "Go For Broke". He also made a cameo appearance on the "Dreamers" episode of fox's musical drama television series Star in 2018. In 2019, he guest-starred in the fifth-season finale of ABC's Black-ish and HBO's Ballers. In the following year, he along with Billie Eilish, Big Sean, DJ Khaled and Usher appeared on the finale episode of Justin Bieber: Seasons, a YouTube docu-series about Canadian singer Justin Bieber. He also made a guest appearance on the sophomore season of Narcos: Mexico.

Quavo appeared in the thriller film Savage Salvation directed by Randall Emmett as Coyote; which released on December 2, 2022.

Along with Chloe Bailey and Anjelika Washington, Quavo starred in the Atlanta-set gospel-choir-competition-based film Praise This, which was released in the U.S. and Canada on April 7, 2023.

=== NBA All-Star Celebrity Games ===
Quavo received the MVP Award during the 2018 NBA All-Star Celebrity Game after a 19-point performance and victory. In 2019, Quavo played on the "Away" roster during the NBA All-Star Celebrity Game at the Bojangles' Coliseum in Charlotte, North Carolina, and again during the 2020 All-Star Celebrity Game in Chicago.

=== Fan Controlled Football League ===
Quavo is one of four partial owners of the FCF Glacier Boyz, a team in the Fan Controlled Football League.

== Personal life ==
=== Family and relationships ===
In 2017, Quavo briefly dated actress Karrueche Tran. Quavo began dating Saweetie in September 2018. On March 19, 2021, Saweetie confirmed via social media that she and Quavo are no longer in a relationship. She also mentioned on social media that Quavo had been unfaithful, writing "Presents don't band aid scars and the love isn't real when the intimacy is given to other women." In late March 2021, video footage surfaced showing the pair in a physical altercation that allegedly happened in 2020.

In May 2020, Quavo announced that he had graduated from high school after dropping out 11 years earlier. As of October 2026, Quavo has two children.

=== Political activity ===
Quavo supported Bernie Sanders' 2016 presidential campaign.

Quavo witnessed Takeoff's murder in the early hours of November 1, 2022. He, Takeoff, and around 30 others were gathered outside of a bowling alley in Houston, Texas after a private party ended. Quavo was involved in an argument over a dice game and was shot at as he was walking away. Takeoff was fatally struck by a stray bullet, and two other people suffered non-life-threatening injuries. Following Takeoff's death, Quavo became outspoken about gun violence prevention. In September 2023, Quavo met with vice president Kamala Harris and spoke about gun violence during the annual Congressional Black Caucus legislative conference. In March 2024, Quavo announced the launch of the Spark Grants initiative which will award ten different organizations with $10,000 to help spread awareness and minimize gun violence around Atlanta. The grant was handed out to recipients on June 18, 2024, which marks the birthday of Takeoff and falls during National Gun Violence Awareness Month.

=== Legal issues ===
On April 18, 2015, authorities stopped a Migos concert at Georgia Southern University and arrested all three members of the group, as well as several members of their entourage. Quavo was charged with possession of an unspecified Schedule II narcotic, possession of marijuana, possession of a firearm in a school safety zone, and possession of a firearm during the commission of a crime. He was released from jail on bond, and later pleaded no contest to misdemeanor marijuana charges and received a 12-month sentence, which was suspended based on payment of fines.

In December 2021, Quavo was sued for his alleged involvement in the assault of a limo driver earlier in July 2021.

== Discography ==
Studio albums

- Quavo Huncho (2018)
- Rocket Power (2023)
- Qrömelife (2026)

Collaborative albums

- Huncho Jack, Jack Huncho (with Travis Scott as Huncho Jack) (2017)
- Only Built for Infinity Links (with Takeoff as Unc & Phew) (2022)

== Filmography ==
=== Film roles ===
Year	Title	Role	Notes
2022	Savage Salvation	Coyote	
2023	Praise This	Ty	
2024	Cash Out	Anton	
2025	High Rollers	Anton	
2025	Sneaks	Spike (voice)	
2026	Moses the Black	Straw	
2026	Takeover	Guy Miller	
2026	The Gentleman Thief	Anton	Post-production

Television series
Year	Title	Role	Notes
2016	Atlanta	Himself	Episode: "Go for Broke"
2018	Star	Himself	Episode: "Dreamers"
2019	Black-ish	Himself	Episode: "Relatively Grown Man"
2019	Ballers	Himself	Episode: "Players Only"
2020	Justin Bieber: Seasons	Himself	Episode: "The Finale"
2020	Narcos: Mexico	Himself	Episode: "Alea lacta Est"

== Awards and nominations ==
Year	Awards	Category	Nominated work	Result
2017	Teen Choice Awards	Choice Electronic/Dance Song	"Know No Better" (with Major Lazer, Travis Scott and Camila Cabello)	Won
2017	Teen Choice Awards	Choice R&B/Hip-Hop Song	"I'm the One" (with DJ Khaled, Justin Bieber, Chance the Rapper and Lil Wayne)	Won
2017	MTV Video Music Awards	Best Hip Hop Video	"I'm the One" (with DJ Khaled, Justin Bieber, Chance the Rapper and Lil Wayne)	Nominated
2017	American Music Awards	Collaboration of the Year	"I'm the One" (with DJ Khaled, Justin Bieber, Chance the Rapper and Lil Wayne)	Nominated
2017	American Music Awards	Favorite Song – Rap/Hip-Hop	"I'm the One" (with DJ Khaled, Justin Bieber, Chance the Rapper and Lil Wayne)	Won
2018	Nickelodeon Kids' Choice Awards	Favorite Song	"I'm the One" (with DJ Khaled, Justin Bieber, Chance the Rapper and Lil Wayne)	Nominated
2018	Billboard Music Awards	Top Streaming Song (Audio)	"Congratulations" (with Post Malone)	Nominated
2018	Billboard Music Awards	Top Rap Song	"I'm the One" (with DJ Khaled, Justin Bieber, Chance the Rapper and Lil Wayne)	Nominated
2020	MTV Video Music Awards	Best Pop Video	"Intentions" (with Justin Bieber)	Nominated

Preceded by Branko, Sara Tavares & Mayra Andrade	Eurovision Song Contest; Final Interval act 2019 with Madonna	Succeeded by TBD
