= Ice Spice discography =

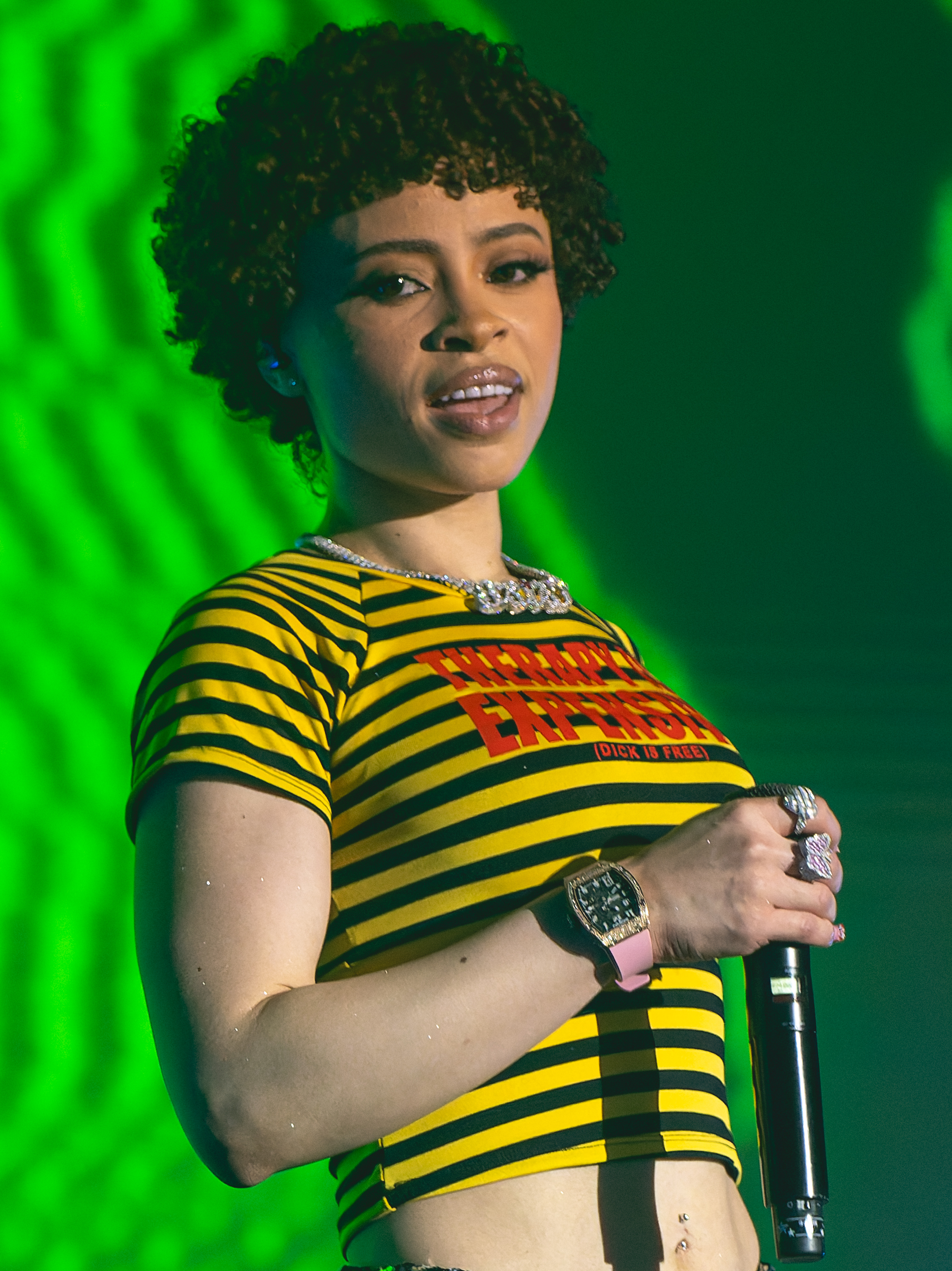
- Ice Spice performing at Outernet London in 2024
- Studio albums: 1
- EPs: 1
- Singles: 25
- Music videos: 19

American rapper Ice Spice has released one studio album, one extended play, twenty-four singles (including three as a featured artist), and eleven music videos. She began releasing singles in 2021, which included "Bully Freestyle" and "No Clarity". In September 2022, Ice Spice signed a record deal with 10K Projects, which serves as an imprint of Capitol Records. Her debut EP, Like..?, was released in January 2023 and charted at number 15 on the US Billboard 200. It also produced her first chart entry on the US Billboard Hot 100, the track "Gangsta Boo".

Ice Spice also went on to release several successful collaborations in 2023. She co-performed on the remix of PinkPantheress's 2023 song "Boy's a Liar" (titled "Boy's a Liar Pt. 2), which peaked at number three on the Billboard Hot 100. A Nicki Minaj remix of Like...? track "Princess Diana" peaked at number four. She also appeared on the remix of Taylor Swift's single "Karma", which peaked at number two on the chart. Ice Spice and Minaj contributed the Aqua collaboration "Barbie World" to the Barbie the Album soundtrack, which peaked at number seven. Her debut studio album, Y2K! (2024), was led by the single "Think U the Shit (Fart)".

== Studio albums ==
List of studio albums, with selected details and chart positions
Title	Details	Peak chart positions					
Title	Details	US	US R&B/HH	CAN	FRA	LTU	POL
Y2K!	Released: July 26, 2024; Deluxe: December 25, 2024; Labels: 10K Projects, Capitol; Formats: CD, LP, digital download, streaming	18	3	54	124	20	43

== Extended plays ==
List of extended plays, with selected details and chart positions
Title	Details	Peak chart positions					
Title	Details	US	US R&B/HH	CAN	FRA	LTU	NZ
Like..?	Released: January 20, 2023; Deluxe: July 21, 2023; Labels: 10K Projects, Capitol; Formats: LP, digital download, streaming	15	5	42	175	45	21

== Singles ==
=== As lead artist ===
List of singles as lead artist, showing selected chart positions, certifications, and associated albums
Title	Year	Peak chart positions										Certifications	Album
Title	Year	US	US R&B /HH	CAN	FRA	IRE	NLD	NZ	SWE	UK	WW	Certifications	Album
"Bully Freestyle"	2021	—	—	—	—	—	—	—	—	—	—		Non-album singles
"No Clarity"	2021	—	—	—	—	—	—	—	—	—	—		Non-album singles
"Be a Lady"	2022	—	—	—	—	—	—	—	—	—	—		Non-album singles
"Name of Love"	2022	—	—	—	—	—	—	—	—	—	—		Non-album singles
"Euphoric"	2022	—	—	—	—	—	—	—	—	—	—		Non-album singles
"Munch (Feelin' U)"	2022	— (Note: "Munch (Feelin' U)" did not enter the Billboard Hot 100, but peaked at number five on the Bubbling Under Hot 100 Singles chart.)	34	—	—	—	—	—	—	—	—	RIAA: Platinum; MC: Gold	Like..?
"Bikini Bottom"	2022	—	—	—	—	—	—	— (Note: "Bikini Bottom" did not enter the NZ Top 40 Singles Chart, but peaked at number 29 on the NZ Hot Singles Chart.)	—	—	—	RIAA: Gold	Like..?
"In Ha Mood"	2023	58	18	69	—	66	—	— (Note: "In Ha Mood" did not enter the NZ Top 40 Singles Chart, but peaked at number 22 on the NZ Hot Singles Chart.)	—	58	192	RIAA: Platinum; MC: Platinum; RMNZ: Gold	Like..?
"Boy's a Liar Pt. 2" (with PinkPantheress)	2023	3	—	2	79	—	18	1	15	—	3	RIAA: Platinum; MC: 3× Platinum; RMNZ: 3× Platinum; SNEP: Platinum	Heaven Knows
"Princess Diana" (solo or with Nicki Minaj)	2023	4	2	21	158	25	— (Note: "Princess Diana" did not enter the Dutch Single Top 100, but peaked at number 10 on the Dutch Single Tip chart.)	31	— (Note: "Princess Diana" did not enter the Swedish Singellista Chart, but peaked at number 15 on the Swedish Heatseeker Chart.)	22	11	RIAA: Platinum; BPI: Silver; MC: Platinum; RMNZ: Gold	Like..?
"Barbie World" (with Nicki Minaj and Aqua)	2023	7	3	7	16	6	44	3	9	4	6	ARIA: Platinum; BPI: Gold; MC: Platinum; RMNZ: Platinum; SNEP: Gold	Barbie the Album
"Deli"	2023	41	12	61	—	87	—	— (Note: "Deli" did not enter the NZ Top 40 Singles Chart, but peaked at number 14 on the NZ Hot Singles Chart.)	—	72	103	RIAA: Platinum; MC: Gold; RMNZ: Gold	Like..? (Deluxe)
"Pretty Girl" (featuring Rema)	2023	— (Note: "Pretty Girl" did not enter the Hot 100, however did peak at 6 on the World Digital Song Sales chart, and 28 on both the US Rhythmic and Mainstream Top 40 Charts.)	—	—	—	—	—	— (Note: "Pretty Girl" did not enter the NZ Top 40 Singles Chart, but peaked at number 24 on the NZ Hot Singles Chart.)	—	—	—		Non-album single
"Think U the Shit (Fart)"	2024	37	14	41	—	—	—	— (Note: "Think U the Shit (Fart)" did not enter the NZ Top 40 Singles Chart, but peaked at number six on the NZ Hot Singles Chart.)	—	75	78		Y2K!
"Gimmie a Light"	2024	—	—	—	—	—	—	— (Note: "Gimmie a Light" did not enter the NZ Top 40 Singles Chart, but peaked at number 24 on the NZ Hot Singles Chart.)	—	—	—		Y2K!
"Phat Butt"	2024	—	—	—	—	—	—	— (Note: "Phat Butt" did not enter the NZ Top 40 Singles Chart, but peaked at number 39 on the NZ Hot Singles Chart.)	—	—	—		Y2K!
"Did It First" (with Central Cee)	2024	51	10	37	169	20	75	16	— (Note: "Did It First" did not enter the Swedish Singellista Chart, but peaked at number 20 on the Swedish Heatseeker Chart.)	15	30	BPI: Silver; RMNZ: Gold	Y2K!
"Oh Shhh..." (with Travis Scott)	2024	— (Note: "Oh Shhh..." did not enter the Billboard Hot 100, but peaked at number 19 on the Bubbling Under Hot 100 Singles chart.)	36	—	—	—	—	— (Note: "Oh Shhh..." did not enter the NZ Top 40 Singles Chart, but peaked at number 15 on the NZ Hot Singles Chart.)	—	—	—		Y2K!
"Popa"	2024	—	—	—	—	—	—	—	—	—	—		Y2K!
"Hannah Montana" (featuring NLE Choppa and DaBaby)	2025	—	—	—	—	—	—	—	—	—	—		Y2K!: I'm Just a Girl
"Gyatt" (with Latto)	2025	— (Note: "Gyatt" did not enter the Billboard Hot 100, but peaked at number one on the Bubbling Under Hot 100 chart.)	23	—	—	—	—	— (Note: "Gyatt" did not enter the NZ Top 40 Singles Chart, but peaked at number 20 on the NZ Hot Singles Chart.)	—	—	—		Non-album single
"Baddie Baddie"	2025	—	—	—	—	—	—	—	—	—	—		TBA
"Big Guy"	2025	100	23	—	—	—	—	— (Note: "Big Guy" did not enter the NZ Top 40 Singles Chart, but peaked at number 18 on the NZ Hot Singles Chart.)	—	—	—		Non-album single
"Thootie" (with Tokischa)	2025	—	—	—	—	—	—	—	—	—	—		TBA
"Out My Face (My Baby)" (with Lil Yachty)	2026	—	—	—	—	—	—	—	—	—	—		TBA
"—" denotes a recording that did not chart or was not released in that territory.

=== As featured artist ===
List of singles as featured artist, showing selected chart positions and associated albums
Title	Year	Peak chart positions				Certifications	Album
Title	Year	US	NLD	NZ Hot	WW	Certifications	Album
"Karma (Remix)" (Taylor Swift featuring Ice Spice)	2023	2	60	—	6		Midnights (The Til Dawn Edition)
"Fisherrr (Remix)" (Cash Cobain and Bay Swag featuring Ice Spice)	2024	—	—	—	—	RIAA: Gold	Non-album singles
"Gnarly (Remix)" (Katseye featuring Ice Spice)	2025	—	—	39	—		Non-album singles
"—" denotes a recording that did not chart or was not released in that territory.

== Other charted songs ==
List of other charted songs, showing selected chart positions and associated albums
Title	Year	Peak chart positions				Album
Title	Year	US	US R&B /HH	US Rap	NZ Hot	Album
"Gangsta Boo" (with Lil Tjay)	2023	82	32	16	21	Like..?

== Music videos ==
List of music videos, showing year released and directors
Title	Year	Director
As lead artist
"No Clarity"	2021	Kreative Films
"Name of Love"	2022	Kreative Films
"Euphoric"	2022	Denity
"Munch (Feelin' U)"	2022	George Buford
"Bikini Bottom"	2022	George Buford
"In Ha Mood"	2023	Oliver Cannon and Chris Villa
"Boy's a Liar Pt. 2" (with PinkPantheress)	2023	George Buford and Frederick Buford
"Princess Diana" (with Nicki Minaj)	2023	Edgar Esteves
"Barbie World" (with Nicki Minaj and Aqua)	2023	Hannah Lux Davis
"Deli"	2023	George Buford, Frederick Buford, and Ice Spice
"Pretty Girl" (featuring Rema)	2023	Child and Omar Jones
"Think U the Shit (Fart)"	2024	George Buford, Frederick Buford, and Ice Spice
"Gimmie A Light"	2024	George Buford, Frederick Buford, and Ice Spice
"Phat Butt"	2024	Ice Spice
"Did It First" (with Central Cee)	2024	Edgar Esteves, Nikita Vilchinskii, and Ice Spice
"Oh Shhh..." (with Travis Scott)	2024	George Buford, Frederick Buford, and Ice Spice
"Gyatt" (with Latto)	2025	Hidji World
"Baddie Baddie"	2025	Ice Spice
As featured artist
"Karma" (Taylor Swift featuring Ice Spice)	2023	Taylor Swift
"Fisherrr (Remix)" (Cash Cobain and Bay Swag featuring Ice Spice)	2024	Kevin Douglas
