= DJ Enuff =

American DJ (born 1969)

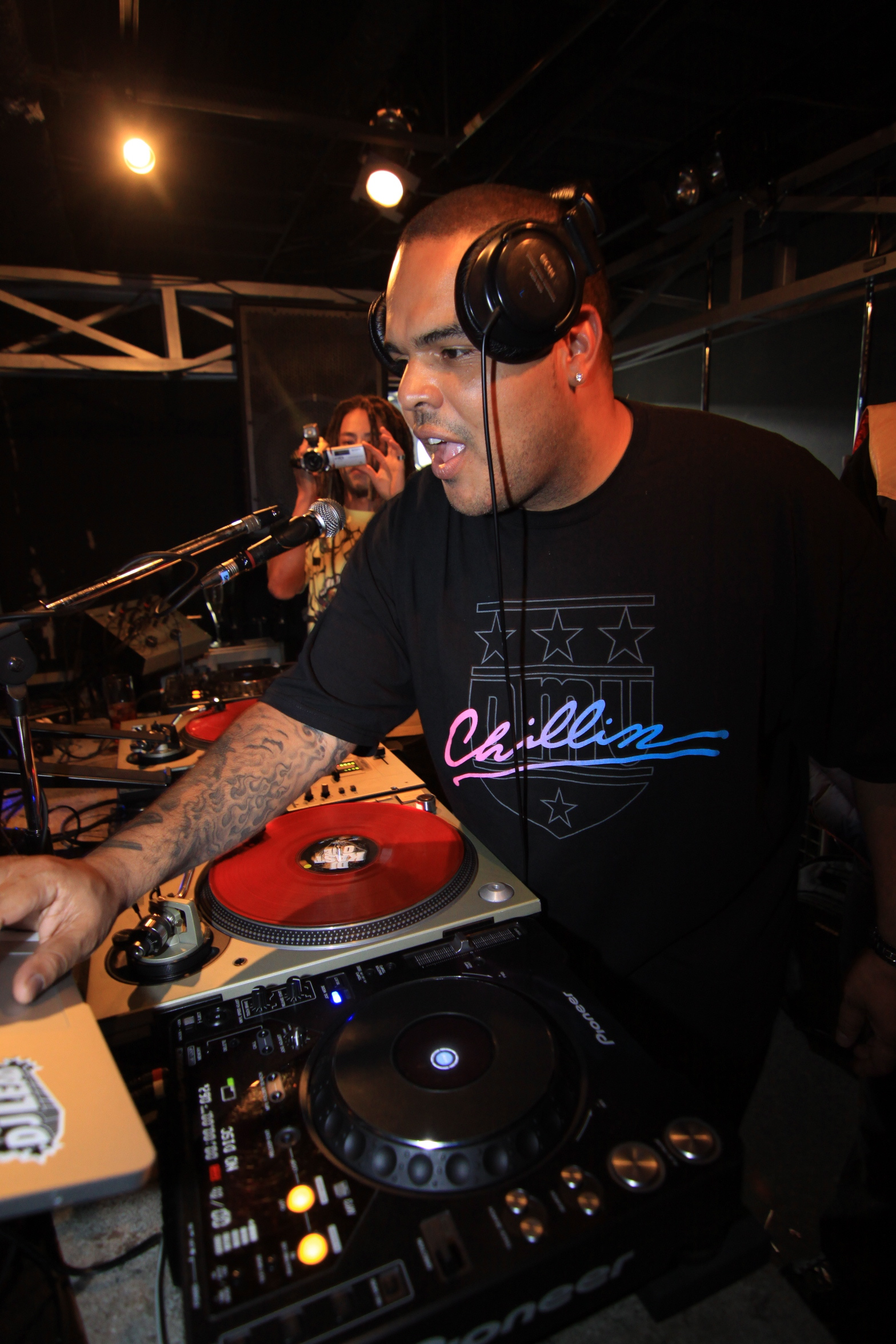
- DJ Enuff in 2009

Background information
- Birth name: Ephrem Louis Lopez
- Born: January 25, 1969 (age 56) Harlem, New York City, U.S.
- Genres: Hip-hop; R&B
- Occupations: Disc jockey; record producer
- Instruments: Turntables; sampler
- Years active: 1991–present
- Labels: HDEC; Heavy Hitter; Elektra; EastWest; Def Jam
- Formerly of: The Heavy Hitters DJs; The Flip Squad
- Children: RiotUSA
- Website: thatsenuff.com

Ephrem Louis Lopez Sr. (born January 25, 1969), known professionally as DJ Enuff, is an American DJ and radio personality. Born in Harlem and raised in Brooklyn, he joined New York City's hip-hop radio station Hot 97 in 1998, where he has since hosted DJ mixes. He is known for being the Notorious B.I.G.'s road DJ during his lifetime, and reprised this role for the 2009 biographical drama film based on the rapper, Notorious. Lopez worked as an A&R staffer for Def Jam Recordings from 1999 to 2001, and founded the Heavy Hitter DJs collective in 2001.

== Personal life ==
Lopez's son, Ephram Lopez Jr., is better known by his stage name RiotUSA. Ephram Jr. has produced several hit songs for fellow New York rapper Ice Spice, including "Munch (Feelin' U)", "Princess Diana", and "Barbie World".

== Production credits ==
- 1996 "Get Money" (remix) – Junior M.A.F.I.A.
- 1997 "You're Nobody (Til Somebody Kills You)"- The Notorious B.I.G. off the album Life After Death; certified Diamond by the Recording Industry Association of America (RIAA).
