= I Need a Girl =

I Need a Girl may refer to:

- "I Need a Girl (Part One)" (2002), a song by P. Diddy featuring Usher and Loon
- "I Need a Girl (Part Two)" (2002), a song by P. Diddy featuring Tammy Ruggeri, Ginuwine, Loon and Mario Winans
- "I Need a Girl (Trey Songz song)" (2009), a song by Trey Songz
- "I Need a Girl (Taeyang song)" (2010), a song by Taeyang featuring G-Dragon
- "I Need a Girl (Part Three)" (2012), a song by Kay One featuring Mario Winans
