= Ephrem Lopez =

Ephrem Lopez may refer to:

- DJ Enuff (Ephrem Louis Lopez, born 1969), American DJ
- RiotUSA (Ephrem Louis Lopez Jr., born 2001), American music producer
