= Bikini (disambiguation) =

A bikini is a type of women's bathing suit.

Bikini or Bikinis may also refer to:

- Bikini Atoll, part of the Marshall Islands in the Pacific Ocean, for which the bathing suit was named
- Bikini (Hungarian band), a Hungarian rock band
- Bikini briefs, a type of underpants
- Bikinis Sports Bar & Grill, a former chain of sports bars and restaurants in Texas
- Bikini-Berlin, building complex in Berlin, named for the shopping mall within it, the Bikini-Haus

== Other uses ==
- Bikini Bottom, a fictional underwater city in the TV series SpongeBob SquarePants
- Bikini Bottom (song), a single by American rapper Ice Spice
- Bikini barista
- Bikini contest, a competition where women compete against each other, dressed in bikinis
- BIKINI state, an indication of an alert state used by the British government from 1970 to 2006
- Bikini waxing, a type of hair removal in the pubic region
