= Deli (song) =

Single by Ice Spice

from the EP Like..? (deluxe)
- Released: July 21, 2023
- Genre: Hip hop; Jersey club
- Length: 2:06
- Label: 10K Projects; Capitol
- Songwriters: Isis Gaston; Ephrem Lopez Jr.
- Producer: RiotUSA

Ice Spice singles chronology
"Barbie World" (2023)	"Deli" (2023)	"Pretty Girl" (2023)

Music video
- "Deli" on YouTube

"Deli" is a song by American rapper Ice Spice. It was released on July 21, 2023, through 10K Projects and Capitol Records, as the fifth single from her debut EP Like..? and the first from its deluxe edition.

== Background and composition ==
Ice Spice shared a teaser of the song on her TikTok on July 9, 2023, which subsequently went viral. She performed the song for the first time at Rolling Loud Miami on July 21.

An "ode to a city staple", the deli, the song was seen as her development "from a scrappy newcomer to a full-blown superstar" coming full circle.

== Music video ==
An accompanying music video was released on July 26, 2023. Directed by the rapper herself, George Buford, and Frederick Buford, it was filmed on July 14 and 15 in Harlem, New York City. The video was shot at a New York bodega store on 145th Street (Manhattan) and sees Ice Spice dancing and twerking along with a few friends, reminiscent of the video for her breakthrough single "Munch (Feelin' U)" (2022). Upon release, the rapper faced backlash for including twerking scenes of 16-year-old Aya Tanjali.

== Charts ==
=== Weekly charts ===
Weekly chart performance for "Deli"
Chart (2023)	Peak position
Australia Hip Hop/R&B (ARIA)	33
Canada Hot 100 (Billboard)	61
Global 200 (Billboard)	103
Ireland (IRMA)	87
New Zealand Hot Singles (RMNZ)	14
UK Singles (OCC)	72
US Billboard Hot 100	41
US Hot R&B/Hip-Hop Songs (Billboard)	12
US R&B/Hip-Hop Airplay (Billboard)	24

=== Year-end charts ===
Year-end chart performance for "Deli"
Chart (2023)	Position
US Hot R&B/Hip-Hop Songs (Billboard)	63

== Certifications ==
Certifications for "Deli"
Region	Certification	Certified units/sales
Canada (Music Canada)	Gold	40,000^{‡}
New Zealand (RMNZ)	Gold	15,000^{‡}
Poland (ZPAV)	Gold	25,000^{‡}
United States (RIAA)	Platinum	1,000,000^{‡}
^{‡} Sales+streaming figures based on certification alone.
