= Gyatt (song) =

2025 single by Latto and Ice Spice

Single by Latto and Ice Spice
- Released: September 2, 2025
- Genre: Hip-hop
- Length: 2:17
- Label: Streamcut; RCA
- Songwriters: Alyssa Stephens; Isis Gaston; Darryl Clemons; Kevin Price; Kaine; Ephrem Lopez Jr.; MadisonLST
- Producers: Pooh Beatz; Go Grizzly; Supakaine; RiotUSA

Latto singles chronology
"Art" (2025)	"Gyatt" (2025)	"Go Girl" (2026)

Ice Spice singles chronology
"Gnarly (Ice Spice Remix)" (2025)	"Gyatt" (2025)	"Baddie Baddie" (2025)

Music video
- "Gyatt" on YouTube

"Gyatt" is a song by American rappers Latto and Ice Spice, released on September 2, 2025. It was produced by Pooh Beatz, Go Grizzly, Supakaine, and RiotUSA. The song marks the end of a feud between the rappers that began in 2023.

== Background ==
Latto and Ice Spice appeared on Kai Cenat's stream on September 4, 2025 to promote the song. When Cenat asked who acted first in ending the feud, they declined to go into detail but according to Ice Spice, Latto sent her the song and she loved it. Latto accused comedian Deshae Frost of leaking the song and Cenat called him on stream. Frost apologized, although he claimed that he was not told to keep the project a secret.

== Content ==
The song finds the rappers boasting about attracting men with their physical features, using the slang word "gyatt" to describe their buttocks and men's reactions to them. Latto raps the opening verse and references their feud, alluding to Ice Spice's diss track against her, "Think U the Shit (Fart)". Ice Spice provides ad-libs on the chorus and raps the second verse, in which she details winning over men with her wealthy lifestyle as well.

== Critical reception ==
The song received generally positive reviews. Devin Morton of HotNewHipHop wrote, "Ice comes through with possibly the most solid performance of her career, sounding remarkably at home on this track. Her flow is strong, even if the lyrics are not much to write home about." Aaron Williams of Uproxx stated "They've got a surprising amount of chemistry for a pair who were so recently at odds, but perhaps that's because it was never really that serious in the first place." Armon Sadler of Vibe remarked, "'Gyatt' is a tribute to the big booties and the people who like to shake them. Who better than two of Hip-Hop's perennial twerkers to make this anthem? It is hands down one of Spice's best songs in a long time, and Latto did what she does best." Zachary Horvath of HotNewHipHop commented, "They both slide over it quite well bringing some funny punchlines to the table. Speaking of the beat, it does slap".

== Music video ==
The music video was directed by Hidji World and released on September 5, 2025. It features cameos from internet personalities Deshae Frost and Tylil James and reality television star JaNa Craig. A WWE-themed clip, it opens with Latto and Ice Spice strutting toward a locker room with their heavyweight belts, which read "Gyatt". They are interviewed by a few people, including Craig, before entering the ring. The rappers compete in twerking and the match concludes in a tie. James is the referee, while Frost is a play-by-play commentator.

== Charts ==
Chart performance for "Gyatt"
Chart (2025)	Peak position
New Zealand Hot Singles (RMNZ)	20
US Bubbling Under Hot 100 (Billboard)	1
US Hot R&B/Hip-Hop Songs (Billboard)	23
