= Big Guy (song) =

2025 single by Ice Spice

Single by Ice Spice
- Released: November 14, 2025
- Genre: Hip-hop
- Length: 2:30
- Label: 10K Projects; Capitol
- Songwriters: Isis Gaston; Ephrem Lopez Jr.; Konstantin Pepelov; Steven Giron
- Producers: RiotUSA; 1keep; Venny

Ice Spice singles chronology
"Baddie Baddie" (2025)	"Big Guy" (2025)	"Thootie" (2025)

Music video
- "Big Guy" on YouTube

"Big Guy" is a song by American rapper Ice Spice. It was released on November 14, 2025, by 10K Projects and Capitol Records. Produced by RiotUSA, 1keep, and Venny, it is featured in the 2025 animated film The SpongeBob Movie: Search for SquarePants, in which the rapper also makes a voice appearance. The song received praise from critics. The song's lyric "SpongeBob, big guy, pants okay" became a meme soon after the song's release, with several critics jokingly describing it as poetic yet simple.

== Recording and release ==
"Big Guy" was recorded as part of the soundtrack to the 2025 animated film The SpongeBob Movie: Search for SquarePants, in which she also has a voice role as a ticket taker fish with somewhat of a resemblance to her. She called appearing on the soundtrack "such a full circle moment" due to the SpongeBob SquarePants franchise being a part of her own childhood. The song was released on November 14, 2025. She stated that she was required to include certain "SpongeBob-related words" in its lyrics.

== Production and composition ==
"Big Guy" contains a running time of two and a half minutes, with production from RiotUSA, 1keep, and Venny. Lyrically, the song includes puns about the ocean and references to SpongeBob SquarePants, such as in the lyrics "I blow bubbles so big like Mrs. Puff" and "Ain't a jellyfish, but I'm the catch". It features no profanities. In its chorus, Ice Spice repeats the phrases "big guy" and "SpongeBob big guy pants okay", which references SpongeBob's attempted growth, both in height and in bravery, within the film. On "Big Guy", Ice Spice raps in a "demure" monotone.

== Critical reception ==
Jeff Ihaza of Rolling Stone wrote that "Big Guy" was an "impossibly catchy bop" with "cleverly adapted" lyrics and the "wholesomeness of a Bronx drill Cocomelon". For Paper, Tobias Hess called the song "classic Spice" and "an exciting, if not a bit confounding return to form".

The lyric "SpongeBob big guy pants okay" went viral online shortly after the song's release, with some people attaching the song via a quote tweet whenever someone includes "big guy" in a post. Mathew Rodriguez of Them wrote that the lyric was "so confident in its simplicity — and yet, confounding in its complexity", while Hess called it a "simple, yet effective line that [Ice Spice] chants like a political slogan" and a "poetic puzzle". For Vulture, Fran Hoepfner wrote that the lyric was "so poetic yet so simple" and "struck [her] to [her] core", but that the question of if it was "a 'good' lyric" was "complicated".

== Commercial performance ==
On January 3, 2026, "Big Guy" debuted on the US Hot R&B/Hip-Hop Songs chart, peaking at number 23 three weeks later. It remained on the chart for six weeks. On January 24, the same day of its peak, the song debuted at number 100 on the Billboard Hot 100, remaining there for one week. Internationally, "Big Guy" peaked at number 18 on the New Zealand Hot Singles chart, number 22 on the Australia Hip-Hop/R&B Singles chart, and number 79 on the singles chart of Israel. Additionally, "Big Guy" is certified Gold by Pro-Música Brasil for selling 20,000 units.

== Music video ==
The music video was released on November 14, 2025. It depicts the rapper riding an underwater roller coaster, and also features her animated character and scenes from the film. Rodriguez called it "a fairly standard, if not somewhat lackluster, visual".

== Personnel ==
Credits are adapted from Tidal.

- Isis Gaston – vocals, writing
- Ephrem Lopez Jr. – writing, production
- Konstantin Pepelov (1keep) – production
- Steven Giron (Venny) – production
- Colin Leonard – mastering engineer
- Daylon "Slayron" Hammond – mixing engineer

== Charts ==
Chart performance
Chart (2025–2026)	Peak position
Australia Hip Hop/R&B (ARIA)	22
Israel (Mako Hitlist)	79
New Zealand Hot Singles (RMNZ)	18
UK Video Streaming (Official Charts)	7
US Billboard Hot 100	100
US Hot R&B/Hip-Hop Songs (Billboard)	23

== Certifications ==
Certifications for "Big Guy"
Region	Certification	Certified units/sales
Brazil (Pro-Música Brasil)	Gold	20,000^{‡}
^{‡} Sales+streaming figures based on certification alone.
