= Gangsta Boo (song) =

Song by Ice Spice and Lil Tjay

from the EP Like..?
- Released: January 20, 2023
- Studio: Westlake (Los Angeles)
- Genre: Drill
- Length: 2:39
- Label: 10K Projects; Capitol
- Songwriters: Isis Gaston; Ephrem Lopez Jr.; Adonis Shropshire; Chauncey Lamont Hawkins; Frank Romano; Mario Winans; Michael Carlos Jones; Sean "Puffy" Combs
- Producers: RiotUSA; Mario Winans

Visualizer
- "Gangsta Boo" on YouTube

"Gangsta Boo" is a song by American rappers Ice Spice and Lil Tjay from the former's debut extended play (EP), Like..? (2023).

== Composition ==
"Gangsta Boo" is a drill song, based around a sample of "I Need a Girl (Part Two)" (2002), a song by P. Diddy and Ginuwine featuring Loon, Mario Winans, and Tammy Ruggieri. Produced by frequent collaborator RiotUSA, "Gangsta Boo" features looped guitar licks alongside club beats produced by booming hi-hat and bass drums. It was conceived as a tribute to rapper Gangsta Boo, who died shortly after it was made. When Ice Spice was recording the song, she thought of possible guest appearances, saying "I was just thinking who I would hear on it really", and decided on Lil Tjay due to their year-long friendship and shared upbringing of being from the Bronx. Lil Tjay recorded his verse at Westlake Recording Studios in West Hollywood, California.

In "Gangsta Boo", which showcases a love story from two perspectives, Ice Spice raps about her desire to be in a relationship with a "gangsta boo" boyfriend. She initiates a romantic interaction with the potential partner, "A baddie got' get what she like/So what's your sign, 'cause I like you?", and expresses her disdain for her romantic rivals: "Fuck your thots, I'm takin' they spot/ Bitches know that I am what they not". In spite of this, she has some reservations with her flirting, as she feels shy about inviting him to her house. In his verse, Lil Tjay reasserts his status as the "gangsta boo" in question, replying to Ice Spice "I don't think you should play with me/ 'Cause you gon' end up like the last opp" and claiming "I'm a thug off some drugs in my home/ And say, long before rap, I was playin' the back box". He raps about how he can take care of any woman who can be his girlfriend, then warns his enemies not to get in his bad side or else he and Ice Spice would get violent towards them.

== Reception ==
"Gangsta Boo" was Ice Spice's first entry into the Billboard Hot 100, the national record chart for songs in the United States. It debuted at number 82, bolstered by 5.1 million streams, 727,000 radio airplay audience impressions, and 3,000 digital downloads. "Gangsta Boo" also appeared on Hot R&B/Hip-Hop Songs, debuting at number 32.

Stereogum and Uproxx praised the chemistry between Ice Spice and Lil Tjay in "Gangsta Boo". Stereogum in particular, who called the song the week's best new release, was positive that "the rappers [were] actually engaging with each other" and appreciated the awkward tone of their characters' interactions in the song because it made them sound "smooth and effortless". The New York Times wrote that while the song "doesn't have the venomous attitude that made Ice Spice's breakout single [...] pop, [...] her effortless charisma sells the track just the same."

== Music video ==
A music video for "Gangsta Boo" was scheduled to be filmed in early January 2023. However, Lil Tjay was arrested during the day of the filming, which prompted Ice Spice to shoot the video for "In Ha Mood" instead.

== Charts ==
Chart performance for "Gangsta Boo"
Chart (2023)	Peak position
New Zealand Hot Singles (RMNZ)	21
US Billboard Hot 100	82
US Hot R&B/Hip-Hop Songs (Billboard)	32
