= Barbie World =

2023 single by Nicki Minaj and Ice Spice with Aqua

Single by Nicki Minaj and Ice Spice with Aqua

from the album Barbie the Album
- Released: June 23, 2023
- Recorded: February–April 2023
- Genre: Drill; pop rap
- Length: 1:49
- Label: 10K Projects; Capitol; Atlantic
- Songwriters: Onika Maraj; Isis Gaston; Ephrem Lopez Jr.; Johnny Pederson; Karsten Dahlgaard; Lene Nystrøm; Claus Norreen; René Dif; Søren Rasted
- Producer: RiotUSA

Nicki Minaj singles chronology
"Pound Town 2" (2023)	"Barbie World" (2023)	"Endless Fashion" (2023)

Ice Spice singles chronology
"Karma" (2023)	"Barbie World" (2023)	"Deli" (2023)

Aqua singles chronology
"I Am What I Am" (2021)	"Barbie World" (2023)

Music video
- "Barbie World" on YouTube

"Barbie World" is a song by rappers Nicki Minaj and Ice Spice from Barbie the Album, the soundtrack of the film Barbie (2023). It was released by Atlantic Records, 10K Projects, and Capitol Records as the soundtrack's third single on June 23, 2023. Produced by RiotUSA, the song heavily samples the 1997 single "Barbie Girl" by Danish Europop band Aqua, who are credited as performers and co-writers in the song.

"Barbie World" debuted at number seven on the US Billboard Hot 100, becoming Minaj's 23rd, Ice Spice's fourth, and Aqua's second top-10 chart entry. It also charted in the top 10 in Australia, Austria, Canada, Denmark, Germany, Luxembourg, Ireland, New Zealand, Norway, Poland, South Africa, Sweden, Switzerland and the United Kingdom. The song was nominated for Best Song Written for Visual Media and Best Rap Song at the 66th Annual Grammy Awards, Minaj's first two Grammy nominations in seven years, following her previous nods at the 58th Annual Grammy Awards for her album The Pinkprint. The song subsequently won the Nickelodeon Kids' Choice Award for Favorite Music Collaboration during the 2024 ceremony.

== Background ==
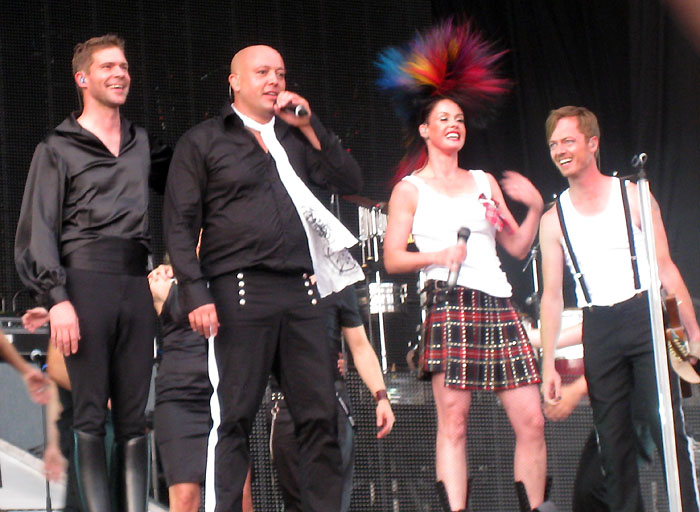
Aqua in 2008

In 1997, Danish-Norwegian band Aqua released "Barbie Girl", a song about two fashion dolls manufactured by Mattel named Barbie and Ken. The song was a massive success, thrusting the band into worldwide fame. Per Stephen Thomas Erlewine, "Barbie Girl" was an "inexplicable pop culture phenomenon", and Bree Player of Marie Claire Australia wrote it helped solidify the Barbie doll as a cultural icon. However, Mattel reacted negatively to "Barbie Girl" and sued Aqua's US label, MCA Records, claiming the band violated their trademark and the lyrics' sexually suggestive nature stained the company's reputation as a child-friendly brand.

Since the beginning of her career, rapper Nicki Minaj has made the Barbie doll a significant part of her public persona. A widely known aspect of her artistry is her use of alter egos, one of whom is named Harajuku Barbie. Through this alter ego, Minaj showcases her feminine, fashion-savvy side with wigs, makeup, and nails that are bright and vibrant in color. Her Barbie image extends to her fanbase's name, the "Barbz", derived from Harajuku Barbie's name. Mattel has interacted with Minaj once: the two worked on a custom-made Harajuku Barbie-inspired doll auctioned for a charity for people affected with HIV/AIDS.

Making a live-action Barbie film had been an endeavor Mattel sought to pursue for over 10 years, with many failed tries. In another attempt, the company struck a partnership with Warner Bros. Pictures by early 2019 to create a film that would star actress Margot Robbie. Production began in March 2022; initial discussions for the soundtrack followed four months later. Barbie the Album, executive produced by Mark Ronson, was to encompass several stylings of contemporary pop music, from dance and K-pop to drill and Reggaeton. Moises Mendez II of Time described many of the songs as "tongue-in-cheek girl power pop".

== Music and lyrics ==
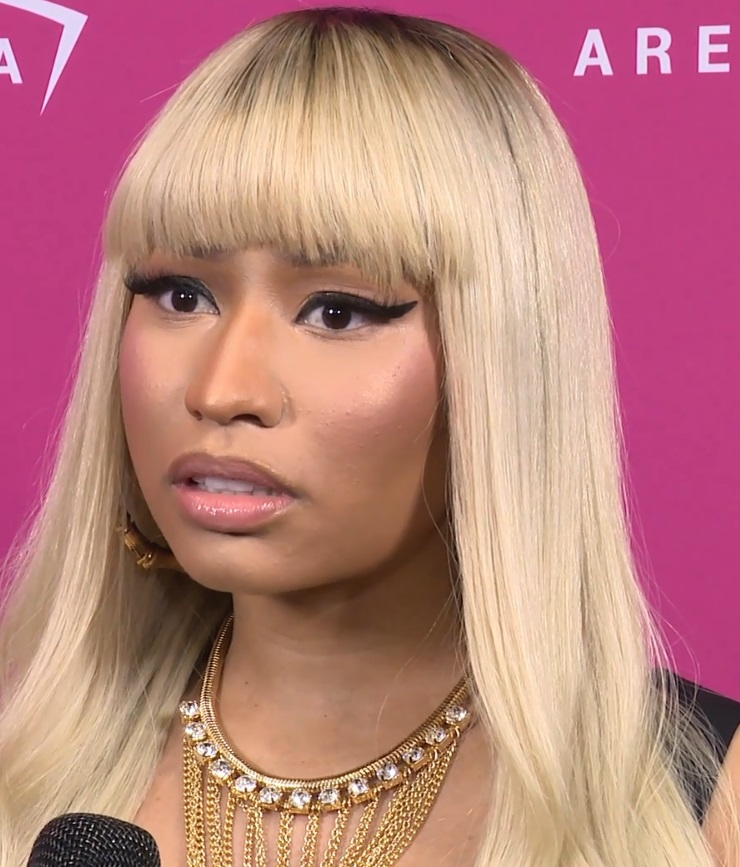
Minaj's usage of Barbie in her public persona led to her being considered for the Barbie soundtrack.

There are 16 songs on the soundtrack, and the third is named "Barbie World". It samples Aqua's "Barbie Girl", looping the chorus's vocals from the band's lead singer, Lene Nystrøm. Making the song began with figuring out how to integrate the sample, so Ronson turned to producer RiotUSA to create a beat around it, though the plan was not in the script the film's director, Greta Gerwig, had. Initially, in 2022, Nystrøm's manager stated "Barbie Girl" would not be used on the film, to an indignant reaction from fans. Variety speculated bad relations between Mattel and MCA Records were the cause. Nevertheless, the team behind the soundtrack, including Robbie, were passionate for it to be included in some way. They were faced with a dilemma: whether to include "Barbie Girl" on the soundtrack directly, or to instead reimagine it. When asked why they chose the second, Ronson said: "I don't know, you'd have to ask Greta. But everything about this film is trying to be a reinvention or an evolution of what we think Barbie is, so maybe [the sampling] was a way of doing that."

Minaj is one of the 19 musicians that appear on Barbie the Album and one of the performers on "Barbie World". Mark Ronson's goal from the start of curating the soundtrack, was to include Minaj. Ronson, alongside Gerwig, deemed Minaj an "obvious choice" for artists to include in their "dream list" of potential collaborators due to her long-time association with the Barbie brand. He also alluded to her fanbase's "Barbz" name as further solidifying their choice. In an interview with Music Week, Ronson remarked, "there's no way we can have a Barbie soundtrack without Nicki Minaj—the person who's literally kept the term 'Barbie' alive in music and pop culture for 15 years." At first, Minaj was reluctant to make a song for the team, rejecting several demos from the team. As she revealed in a red carpet interview, people have sent her samples of "Barbie Girl" on which they wanted her to rap for years, but she never liked any of them. She said every sample made her feel uncomfortable or gimmicky.

Ronson and his team invited another rapper, Ice Spice, to contribute to "Barbie World". They had been eyeing her since she rose to fame with the single "Munch (Feelin' U)" in August 2022, considering her status as the "most exciting new thing in music" something that would prove useful for the soundtrack. RiotUSA, her long-time collaborator, connected her to Ronson after working on the sample. The three were slated to, on one evening, meet at a studio at 9 pm, so Ronson can show Ice Spice a 20-minute snippet of the film and she can send her verses. The viewings, according to Ronson, would help artists match the tone and theme of their lyrics to the scenes assigned to them. There was a conflict in schedule between him and other two: Ronson waited until around 11 pm for updates from them, to no response. He prepared for bed only to get a message shortly afterward, biking to the studio and meeting them by midnight. Whereas Ronson failed to convince Minaj to work on "Barbie World", he succeeded in doing so with Ice Spice, due to the two rappers' amicable work relationship.

The final result is a fusion of hip hop and pop with elements of drill and Jersey club. It combines syncopated percussion with loud bass drums, with uncredited contributions from Ronson, who played keys. In the words of Melissa Ruggieri of USA Today, a "slithering beat that weaves in and out of its bass-heavy pulse" makes up the production. The use of drums, apart from how "Barbie World" did not sound like a gimmick to Minaj, is another thing she cited as to why she was drawn to the song. She said: "I just wanted it to have a dope drum, and so the one that they sent me, I loved!" The song begins with back-and-forth rapping between Ice Spice ("And I'm bad like the Barbie") and Minaj ("I'm a doll but I still wanna party"). The two namedrop Jazzie, Stacie, and Nikki, three dolls who are Barbie's cousin, sister, and friend, respectively. The Nikki namedrop doubly acts as a reference to Minaj. Afterwards, Minaj raps, "all of the Barbies is bad". One of the lyrics, teased at the end of the film's trailer, reads "it's Barbie, bitch, if you still in doubt". As observed by Natalee Gilbert of XXL, Minaj came up with "it's Barbie, bitch" as a way to say goodbye to people, influenced by her alter ego, Harajuku Barbie. Due to the sample, Aqua received performing and writing credits on the song.

== Release ==
In April 2022, it was announced that the live-action Barbie film would be released on July 21, 2023. In May 2023, a second trailer for the film was released, which featured a snippet of a new song with vocals from Minaj. Media speculated the composition to be a remix of "Barbie Girl". On May 25, Barbie the Album, the soundtrack to the film, was announced. Minaj and fellow rapper Ice Spice were revealed among multiple artists to be performing new original material on the record. Following the tracklist release, it was confirmed that the new song was a collaboration between Minaj and Ice Spice, titled "Barbie World".

On June 10, both rappers announced the song's release date as June 23, 2023, marking the third single from the film's soundtrack. Minaj previewed "Barbie World" twice on her social media, on June 12 and 22. It marks the second collaboration between Minaj, Ice Spice, and producer RiotUSA, following the remix of "Princess Diana" (2023).

== Accolades ==
Awards and nominations for "Barbie World"
Year	Organization	Award	Result	Ref.
2023	MTV Video Music Awards	Song of Summer	Nominated	
2024	BET Awards	Video of the Year	Nominated	
2024	BET Awards	Best Collaboration	Nominated	
2024	BMI Pop Awards 2024	Most-Performed Song of the Year	Won	
2024	Grammy Awards	Best Rap Song	Nominated	
2024	Grammy Awards	Best Song Written for Visual Media	Nominated	
2024	People's Choice Awards	The Collaboration of 2024	Won	
2024	iHeartRadio Music Awards	Best Collaboration	Nominated	
2024	ASCAP Pop	Most Performed Pop Songs	Won	
2024	Kids' Choice Awards	Favorite Music Collaboration	Won	
2024	Online Film & Television Association Awards	Best Adapted song	Won	

=== Grammy Awards dispute ===
Upon Killer Mike being announced as the winner of the Best Rap Song category for his song "Scientists & Engineers" at the 66th Annual Grammy Awards; the Recording Academy Twitter account had "accidentally" tweeted that “Barbie World” had won the category.

== Commercial performance ==
In the United States, "Barbie World" debuted at number seven on the Billboard Hot 100 with 16.2 million streams, 37,000 digital downloads sold, and 4.7 million airplay audience—matching the peak of "Barbie Girl". With this, Minaj extended her record for the most top-ten entries by a female rapper (23), she also broke her tie with Eminem and Jay-Z to become the rapper with the third most top ten entries only behind Lil Wayne (25) and Drake (68). She also tied Whitney Houston as the woman with the sixth-most top-tens on the chart. The song also became Ice Spice's fourth and Aqua's second top-ten. As Aqua's second top-ten, it marked the sixth-longest gap between two top-10s in the chart's history, with a span of almost 26 years. It additionally marked the second-longest gap among groups and the longest since Nat King Cole's "The Christmas Song (Merry Christmas to You)" in 2022 (59 years, 6 months). The song also debuted atop the Digital Songs chart, becoming Minaj's sixteenth, Ice Spice's second, and Aqua's first number-one. In Canada, the song peaked at number seven on the Canadian Hot 100 in its fifth week. It additionally charted at number 11 on the Canadian Digital Songs chart.

Across Europe, "Barbie World" achieved commercial success. In Ireland, the song debuted at number 28 on the Irish Singles Chart on the weekly issue ending June 30, 2023, and leaped 15 spots to a new peak of number six during its fifth week on the chart. Similarly, it charted at number 25 in its opening week in the United Kingdom. It eventually leaped to number five on its fifth week on the chart, ascending 15 spots and reached a new peak of number four the following week. It became Ice Spice's first credited top-five hit, Aqua's sixth and Minaj's fifteenth.

"Barbie World" peaked at number three in Australia and New Zealand. It became Spice's second top-five hit in both countries and Minaj's first top-five hit in both countries since "Super Freaky Girl" topped the charts of both countries in 2022.

== Music video ==
Scenes from the music video, the Barbie film, and 2001: A Space Odyssey visually resemble each other in several ways, from the desert setting to the imagery of a gigantic figure towering over smaller individuals.

The music video for "Barbie World" was released to YouTube alongside the song. Hannah Lux Davis directed the visual, which stars Minaj and Ice Spice in Barbie-like attires in a fictitious Barbie Dreamhouse.

== Track listings ==
- Streaming/digital download
1. "Barbie World" – 1:49
- Streaming/digital download – versions
1. "Barbie World" (explicit) – 1:49
2. "Barbie World" (clean) – 1:49
3. "Barbie World" (extended) – 2:16
4. "Barbie World" (sped up) – 1:42
5. "Barbie World" (slowed down) – 2:00
6. "Barbie World" (instrumental) – 1:49
7. "Barbie World" (music video) – 2:11

== Personnel ==
All credits are adapted from CD liner notes of Barbie the Album.

- Onika Maraj – songwriter
- Isis Gaston – songwriter
- RiotUSA – songwriter, producer
- Søren Rasted – songwriter (sample)
- Johnny Pederson – songwriter
- Claus Norreen – songwriter (sample)
- Karsten Dahlgaard – songwriter
- René Dif – songwriter (sample)
- Lene Nystrøm – songwriter (sample)
- Aubry "Big Juice" Delaine – additional production, Nicki Minaj vocal engineering
- Serban Ghenea – mixing
- Bryce Bordone – assistant mix engineer

== Charts ==
=== Weekly charts ===
Weekly chart performance for "Barbie World"
Chart (2023)	Peak position
Australia (ARIA)	3
Australia Hip Hop/R&B (ARIA)	2
Austria (Ö3 Austria Top 40)	10
Belgium (Ultratop 50 Wallonia)	36
Canada Hot 100 (Billboard)	7
Canada CHR/Top 40 (Billboard)	3
Czech Republic Singles Digital (ČNS IFPI)	28
Denmark (Tracklisten)	9
Finland (Suomen virallinen lista)	13
France (SNEP)	16
Germany (GfK)	10
Global 200 (Billboard)	6
Greece International (IFPI)	6
Hungary (Single Top 40)	20
Iceland (Tónlistinn)	11
India International (IMI)	16
Ireland (IRMA)	6
Italy (FIMI)	51
Latvia (LaIPA)	18
Lebanon Airplay (Lebanese Top 20)	20
Lithuania (AGATA)	29
Luxembourg (Billboard)	4
Netherlands (Single Top 100)	44
New Zealand (Recorded Music NZ)	3
Nigeria (TurnTable Top 100)	29
Norway (VG-lista)	7
Poland (Polish Streaming Top 100)	8
Portugal (AFP)	49
Singapore (RIAS)	13
Slovakia Singles Digital (ČNS IFPI)	31
South Africa Streaming (TOSAC)	7
Suriname (Nationale Top 40)	13
Sweden (Sverigetopplistan)	9
Switzerland (Schweizer Hitparade)	8
UK Singles (Official Charts)	4
UK Hip Hop/R&B (Official Charts)	2
US Billboard Hot 100	7
US Adult Pop Airplay (Billboard)	30
US Dance Airplay (Billboard)	21
US Hot R&B/Hip-Hop Songs (Billboard)	2
US Pop Airplay (Billboard)	2
US R&B/Hip-Hop Airplay (Billboard)	27
US Rhythmic Airplay (Billboard)	1

=== Year-end charts ===
2023 year-end chart performance for "Barbie World"
Chart (2023)	Position
Australia (ARIA)	80
Canada (Canadian Hot 100)	45
Global 200 (Billboard)	123
Hungary (Single Top 40)	91
US Billboard Hot 100	46
US Hot R&B/Hip-Hop Songs (Billboard)	18
US Mainstream Top 40 (Billboard)	30
US Rhythmic (Billboard)	18

2024 year-end chart performance for "Barbie World"
Chart (2024)	Position
US Hot R&B/Hip-Hop Songs (Billboard)	68

== Certifications ==
Certifications and sales for "Barbie World"
Region	Certification	Certified units/sales
Australia (ARIA)	Platinum	70,000^{‡}
Canada (Music Canada)	Platinum	80,000^{‡}
Denmark (IFPI Danmark)	Gold	45,000^{‡}
France (SNEP)	Gold	100,000^{‡}
Italy (FIMI)	Gold	50,000^{‡}
New Zealand (RMNZ)	Platinum	30,000^{‡}
Poland (ZPAV)	Gold	25,000^{‡}
United Kingdom (BPI)	Gold	400,000^{‡}
^{‡} Sales+streaming figures based on certification alone.

== Release history ==
Release dates and formats for "Barbie World"
Region	Date	Format(s)	Version	Label(s)	Ref.
Various	June 23, 2023	Digital download; streaming	Single	Atlantic; 10K Projects; Capitol	
Various	June 26, 2023	Digital download; streaming	Versions EP	Atlantic; 10K Projects; Capitol	
United States	June 27, 2023	Contemporary hit radio	Single	Republic; Capitol	
United States	June 27, 2023	Rhythmic contemporary radio	Single	Republic; Capitol	
