= Like..? =

2023 EP by Ice Spice

- Standard cover

EP by Ice Spice
- Released: January 20, 2023
- Genre: Drill
- Length: 13:08
- Labels: 10K Projects; Capitol
- Producer: RiotUSA (also exec.)

Ice Spice chronology
Like..? (2023)	Y2K! (2024)

Singles from Like..?
- 1. "Munch (Feelin' U)" Released: August 10, 2022; 2. "Bikini Bottom" Released: October 28, 2022; 3. "In Ha Mood" Released: January 6, 2023; 4. "Princess Diana" Released: April 14, 2023

Singles from Like..?(deluxe)
- 1. "Deli" Released: July 21 2023

Like..? is the debut extended play by American rapper Ice Spice. It was released on January 20, 2023, through 10K Projects and Capitol Records. Frequent collaborator RiotUSA served as the executive producer for the EP. The EP was preceded by the singles "Munch (Feelin' U)", "Bikini Bottom" and "In Ha Mood". The song "Gangsta Boo", with Lil Tjay, was Ice Spice's first song to enter the Billboard Hot 100 at number 82, while "In Ha Mood" went on to peak at number 58 on the chart.

On April 19, 2023, Ice Spice released a bonus edition of Like..?, which featured a remix to "Princess Diana" with Trinidadian rapper Nicki Minaj. The remix peaked at number four on the Billboard Hot 100 and was Ice Spice's second top-ten on the chart. A deluxe edition of Like..? was then released on July 21, 2023. The deluxe edition was supported by the single "Deli", which peaked at number 41 on the Billboard Hot 100.

== Music and lyrics ==
The EP mainly consists of clipped guitar licks "looped ad nauseam until a smattering of hi-hats and booming bass take over" and distorted vocal samples. On "Princess Diana", Ice Spice addresses her rise to fame. "Gangsta Boo" puts a "drill spin" on Diddy's I Need a Girl (Part Two). "Actin a Smoochie" is "Jersey club rendition" of Tierra Whack's "Cutting Onions" with Ice Spice "bringing colloquial phrases from the Bronx to the front of pop culture". "Deli" is filled with one liners while "How High" features synth-pop sounds.

== Critical reception ==
Professional ratings
Aggregate scores
Source	Rating
Metacritic	69/100
Review scores
Source	Rating
AllMusic	2.5/5 stars
And It Don't Stop	A−
HipHopDX	4.1/5
NME	4/5 stars
Pitchfork	7.6/10

Like..? received generally positive reviews from critics. At Metacritic, which assigns a rating out of 100 to reviews from professional publications, the album received a weighted average score of 69, based on six reviews.

Writing for AllMusic, TiVo Staff states that the "combination of hard drill beats, larger-than-life bravado, and just enough hooks to keep things in the realm of pop all clicked perfectly." He continued his review by noting that the EP "takes steps in the right direction, giving fans something to latch onto." He concluded his review criticizing the weaknesses of the project, writing that "while fun at times, the 13 minutes of music here sounds largely like it's trying to recapture the excitement and effortless appeal of the biggest hit," noting that the project "becomes harder to pay attention to," however stating that it "presents a new artist finding their voice, showing promise in some moments, and losing traction in others." Rebecca Barglowski of HipHopDX wrote that "Ice Spice proves the extent to which she influences pop culture." NME's Thomas Smith describes the project as "such a sharp listen" and states that "longevity feels attainable." Writing for Pitchfork, Heven Haile wrote that "in just six songs, [Ice Spice and RiotUSA] experiments with the past, present, and future of drill." She concluded her review by noting that "Spice;s chilled and cutesy demeanor stands out" and that "her often rudimentary lyrics reflect the brief time she’s had to develop her craft", finishing as she writes that Ice Spice will "give you a nickname that'll require decades of therapy." Mosi Reeves of Rolling Stone wrote that "she has a smooth, deep voice that glides over RIOTUSA’s beats, and her chopping delivery feels effortless."

Andrew Sacher of BrooklynVegan found the new songs of the deluxe edition "instantly-satisfying as the original EP". Armon Sadler of Vibe wrote that "they are quality offerings that feed her listeners and continue a run of simply good music."

=== Year-end lists ===
Select year-end rankings of Like..?
Publication	List	Rank	Ref.
Los Angeles Times	The 20 Best Albums of 2023	6	
The New York Times (Jon Caramanica)	Listening Widely, Feeling Deeply	3	
Billboard	The 50 Best Albums of 2023: Staff List	18	
Slant	The 50 Best Albums of 2023	21	
Pitchfork	The 50 Best Albums of 2023	32	
Rolling Stone	The 100 Best Albums of 2023	52	

== Commercial performance ==
Like..? debuted at number 37 on the US Billboard 200 with 15,000 album-equivalent units. The EP later reached a new peak of number 15, as well as at number 5 on the Top R&B/Hip-Hop Albums chart following the release of the "Princess Diana" remix.

== Track listing ==
All tracks are written by Ice Spice and RiotUSA, except where noted.

Like..? track listing
No.	Title	Writer(s)	Producer(s)	Length
1.	"In Ha Mood"		RiotUSA	2:09
2.	"Princess Diana"		RiotUSA	2:34
3.	"Gangsta Boo" (with Lil Tjay)	Isis Gaston; Tione Merritt; Ephrem Lopez Jr.; Mario Winans; Sean "Puffy" Combs; Adonis Shropshire; Chauncey Lamont Hawkins; Frank Romano; Michael Carlos Jones	RiotUSA; Winans^{[a]}	2:39
4.	"Actin a Smoochie"		RiotUSA	2:13
5.	"Bikini Bottom"		RiotUSA; Ice Spice^{[c]}	1:46
6.	"Munch (Feelin' U)"		RiotUSA; Ice Spice^{[c]}	1:44
Total length:				13:08

Like..? – April 2023 re-release
No.	Title	Writer(s)	Producer	Length
3.	"Princess Diana" (with Nicki Minaj)	Gaston; Onika Maraj; Lopez	RiotUSA	2:52
4.	"Gangsta Boo" (with Lil Tjay)	Gaston; Merritt; Lopez; Winans; Combs; Shropshire; Hawkins; Romano; Jones	RiotUSA; Winans^{[a]}	2:39
5.	"Actin a Smoochie"		RiotUSA	2:13
6.	"Bikini Bottom"		RiotUSA; Ice Spice^{[c]}	1:46
7.	"Munch (Feelin' U)"		RiotUSA; Ice Spice^{[c]}	1:44
Total length:				16:01

Like..? – Deluxe edition
No.	Title	Writer(s)	Producer(s)	Length
1.	"How High?"		RiotUSA	2:10
2.	"Butterfly Ku"		RiotUSA	1:52
3.	"Deli"		RiotUSA	2:07
4.	"In Ha Mood"		RiotUSA	2:09
5.	"Princess Diana" (with Nicki Minaj)	Gaston; Maraj; RiotUSA	RiotUSA	2:52
6.	"Princess Diana"		RiotUSA	2:34
7.	"Gangsta Boo" (with Lil Tjay)	Gaston; Merritt; Lopez; Winans; Combs; Shropshire; Hawkins; Romano; Jones	RiotUSA; Winans^{[a]}	2:39
8.	"Actin a Smoochie"		RiotUSA	2:13
9.	"Bikini Bottom"		RiotUSA; Ice Spice^{[c]}	1:46
10.	"Munch (Feelin' U)"		RiotUSA; Ice Spice^{[c]}	1:44
11.	"On the Radar"			2:05
Total length:				24:15

Notes

- ^{^[c]} signifies a co-producer.
- ^{^[a]} signifies an additional producer.
- "Gangsta Boo" samples "I Need a Girl (Part Two)" (2002), written by Sean "Puffy" Combs, Adonis Shropshire, Chauncey Lamont Hawkins, Frank Romano, Mario Winans, and Michael Carlos Jones, as performed by Diddy.

== Personnel ==
- Ice Spice – rap vocals
- Dayron Hammond – mixing, engineering
- Chris Athens – mastering (tracks 1–4, 6)
- RiotUSA – recording (1–4, 6)
- Harrison Holmes – mastering assistance (1–4, 6)
- Lil Tjay – rap vocals (3)
- Nicki Minaj – rap vocals (7)
- Colin Leonard – mastering (5)
- Hafeez Yussuf – recording (5)

== Charts ==
=== Weekly charts ===
Weekly chart performance for Like..?
Chart (2023–2024)	Peak position
Australian Hip Hop/R&B Albums (ARIA)	40
Australian Hitseekers Albums (ARIA)	29
Canadian Albums (Billboard)	42
French Albums (SNEP)	175
Lithuanian Albums (AGATA)	45
New Zealand Albums (RMNZ)	21
US Billboard 200	15
US Top R&B/Hip-Hop Albums (Billboard)	5

=== Year-end charts ===
Year-end chart performance for Like..?
Chart (2023)	Position
US Billboard 200	119
US Top R&B/Hip-Hop Albums (Billboard)	54

== Release history ==
Release dates and formats for Like..?
Region	Date	Format(s)	Edition	Label	Ref.
Various	January 20, 2023	Digital download; streaming	Standard	10K Projects; Capitol	
Various	June 23, 2023	Vinyl LP	Standard	10K Projects; Capitol	
Various	July 21, 2023	Digital download; streaming	Deluxe	10K Projects; Capitol	
Various	October 27, 2023	Vinyl LP	Deluxe	10K Projects; Capitol	
