= Karma (Taylor Swift song) =

2023 single by Taylor Swift

- Ice Spice remix cover

Single by Taylor Swift

from the album Midnights
- Released: May 1, 2023
- Studio: Rough Customer (Brooklyn); Electric Lady (New York City); Henson (Los Angeles)
- Genre: Synth-pop; chillwave; disco; electroclash
- Length: 3:24
- Label: Republic
- Songwriters: Taylor Swift; Jack Antonoff; Sounwave; Jahaan Sweet; Keanu Beats (Note: Isis Gaston (Ice Spice) and Ephrem Lopez Jr. (RiotUSA) are credited as songwriters on the remix version.)
- Producers: Taylor Swift; Jack Antonoff; Sounwave; Keanu Beats

Taylor Swift singles chronology
| "The Alcott" (2023) | "Karma" (2023) | "Cruel Summer" (2023) |

Ice Spice singles chronology
| "Princess Diana" (2023) | "Karma" (2023) | "Barbie World" (2023) |

Music video
- "Karma" on YouTube

"Karma" is a song by the American singer-songwriter Taylor Swift from her tenth studio album, Midnights (2022). The song was written and produced by Swift, Jack Antonoff, Sounwave, and Keanu Beats; Jahaan Sweet was a co-writer. Republic Records released "Karma" as the third pop radio single and fourth overall from Midnights on May 1, 2023. A remix featuring the American rapper Ice Spice was released on May 26, 2023.

"Karma" combines synth-pop, chillwave, disco, and electroclash, with elements of alternative pop, new wave, and techno. It is instrumented by cascading synth and Omnichord notes. In the lyrics, Swift's narrator proclaims how karma helps her attain good things in life, as opposed to her detractors, who receive backlash for their wrongdoings. Music critics generally praised the production and playful lyrics of "Karma", with some selecting it as a highlight on Midnights. Although the Ice Spice remix received mixed reviews, it was nominated for Best Pop Duo/Group Performance at the 66th Annual Grammy Awards in 2024.

"Karma" peaked at number six on the Billboard Global 200, charted in the top 10 in Australia, Canada, Ireland, Latvia, New Zealand, and the Philippines, and was certified multi-platinum in Australia and New Zealand. In the US, the single peaked at number two on the Billboard Hot 100 and topped the Pop Airplay and Adult Pop Airplay charts. Swift directed the music video for "Karma", which premiered on May 26, 2023. It incorporates cosmic imagery and features her and Ice Spice in outer space. Swift performed "Karma" as the closing song of the Eras Tour (2023–2024).

== Background and release ==
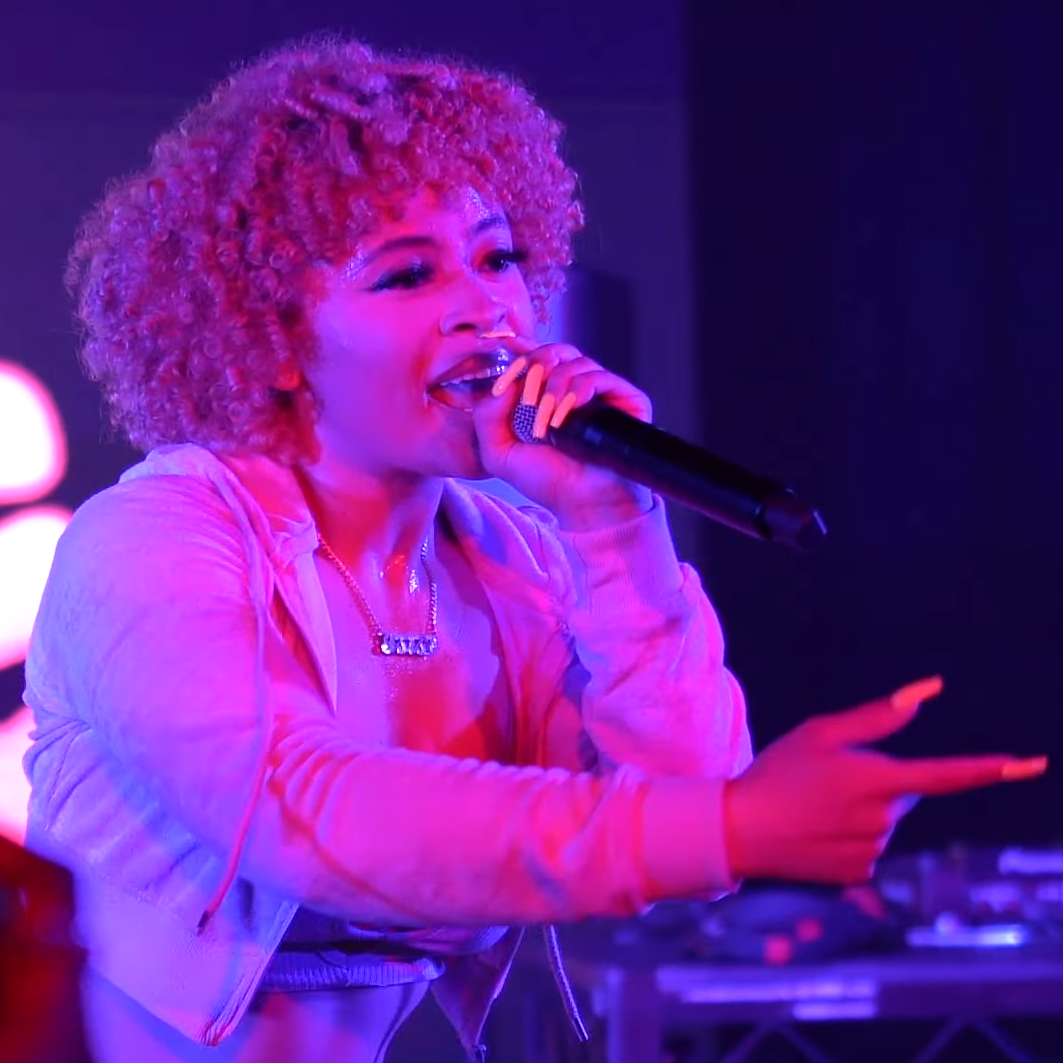
Ice Spice (pictured in 2022) features on the remix of "Karma".

The American singer-songwriter Taylor Swift created her tenth studio album, Midnights, as a collection of songs about her nocturnal ruminations, detailing a wide range of emotions such as regret, lust, nostalgia, contentment, and self-loathing. She produced the standard edition of Midnights with Jack Antonoff. Swift announced the track listing via a thirteen-episode short video series on the platform TikTok; the title of the eighth track, "Karma", was revealed in the episode posted on October 6, 2022.

Midnights was released on October 21, 2022, via Republic Records. "Karma" was the third pop radio single from the album, following "Anti-Hero" and "Lavender Haze", as well as the fourth single overall. Republic Records released "Karma" to US hot adult contemporary radio on May 1, and to US contemporary hit radio on May 2, 2023. On May 26, a remix of "Karma" featuring the rapper Ice Spice was made available as part of a digitally exclusive, extended Til Dawn Edition of Midnights.

According to Swift, Ice Spice's team reached out to her to suggest a collaboration between the two. She contacted Ice Spice personally to ask her to collaborate on "Karma", to which the rapper accepted immediately. Various social media users interpreted the Ice Spice remix as Swift's "damage control" after receiving backlash for her romantic linking with the English singer-songwriter Matty Healy, who had laughed at "racist" jokes about Ice Spice made by the American comedians Adam Friedland and Nick Mullen during their podcast; Healy later issued a public apology to Ice Spice.

== Production and composition ==
After working together on "Lavender Haze", Antonoff asked Sounwave if he had other materials that they could produce for Midnights. Sounwave had created a track with Keanu Beats, which the former described as "something that was too perfect not to send to [Swift]". After Sounwave played the track to Antonoff, the latter sent it to Swift, who recorded her vocals and completed the song the following day. Sounwave described "Karma" as a "last-minute Hail Mary" and contended that the lyricism was "so cool".

"Karma"
A sample of the chorus in "Karma", depicting the cascading synth and Omnichord notes

As listed in the liner notes of Midnights, "Karma" was written and produced by Swift, Antonoff, Sounwave, and Jahaan Sweet; Beats was credited as a co-writer. At 3 minutes and 24 seconds long, "Karma" is an upbeat track, set over a tempo of 90 beats per minute. It incorporates disco, disco-pop, electroclash, synth-pop, and chillwave, with elements of new wave, alternative pop, and techno. The track is instrumented by oscillating Omnichords and synths that create cascades of notes. The music critic Annie Zaleski described the production elements as "dreamy synthesizer shimmers, sun-kissed production and laid-back beats".

In an interview with Apple Music, Swift said she wrote "Karma" from "a perspective of feeling really happy, really proud of the way your life is, feeling like this must be a reward for doing stuff right". Featuring comical lyrics, the song is about Swift's confidence in her positive karma, which rewards her with good things in life. She does not seek revenge on her enemies and instead lets the universe take its course: while karma makes her detractors suffer for their wrongdoings (as depicted in the verses), it bolsters her for her good deeds. In the refrain, she likens the rewards that the universe bestows upon her to things like a "purring", lovable cat, a breeze in her hair on a relaxing day, a boyfriend, and a god. Vulture's Craig Jenkins and The Atlantic's Spencer Kornhaber interpreted "Karma" as a diss track. CT Jones of Rolling Stone contended that "Karma" was the defining moment for Midnights, naming the lyric, "I'm still here", as Swift's "middle finger to the people who prayed for her downfall".

The remix features Ice Spice's new second verse and interjections throughout the song; she wrote her lyrics with RiotUSA. It is a pop rap track that features trap and dancehall elements in the said verse to accompany her rapping flow. The remix begins and ends with Ice Spice's lyrics, "Karma is that girl, like", and, "Karma's gonna hold you down", respectively.

== Critical reception ==
Some reviews praised the production of "Karma" as infectious. John Wohlmacher of Beats Per Minute hailed "Karma" as an "immediate masterpiece", lauding the bright and radiant "singalong" sound. Zaleski contended that it was the album's catchiest song, Paul Nolan of Hot Press deemed it a "banger" and a standout, and Andy Von Pip of Under the Radar complimented Swift's ability to create "huge melodic earworms". The Guardian's Alexis Petridis deemed the track "kaleidoscopically tuneful", reminiscent of Swift's 2014 album 1989. He commented that the lyrical content about revenge, accompanied by the catchy sound, gave the song a "dish-served-cold poise". In Variety, Chris Willman highlighted "Karma" as the album's "most unusual and sonically transfixing track".

Other positive reviews focused on the lyricism. Ann Powers of NPR opined that the track showcased Swift's "wit and tartness", akin to the writer Dorothy Parker. Mikael Wood from the Los Angeles Times described the lyrics as full of "vivid metaphors", while Ellen Johnson from Paste wrote that the couplet, "Karma is a cat/ Purring in my lap 'cause it loves me", could become an "iconic" addition to Swift's discography. Rolling Stone named it the fourth best song of 2022; Jones hailed the combination of Antonoff's "sleekest, most flexible production tendencies" with the metaphors and wordplay. American Songwriter listed "Karma" as one of the 24 best songs of 2022; Alex Hopper praised the "lulling verses" and "effervescent chorus", and deemed the lyricism "deeply Swift in nature", symbolizing her "thesis statement" to her stance on the music industry.

On a less enthusiastic side, Stereogum's Tom Breihan argued that the lyrics were bad "in a fun way", while The Sydney Morning Herald's Giselle Au-Nhien Nguyen contended that a "juvenile" lyric blemished the song ("Karma is my boyfriend"). In The New York Times, Jon Caramanica called it "a largely dim song with an aggressively plastic sound". Saloni Gajjar of The A.V. Club categorized "Karma" as one of the "glaring misfits" on Midnights, calling the song "leftover from Reputation but doesn't match that album's scathing fury". Writing for Billboard, Jason Lipshutz ranked it the second-worst song of Midnights upon its release, calling some wordplay and metaphors questionable. In April 2024, he revisited the track, saying that he had ranked it too low and describing it as the "purest distillation" of Swift's success.

The Ice Spice remix received mixed reviews, with critics commenting that her and Swift's styles did not match well. Shaad D'Souza of Pitchfork opined that the collaboration was a "clash of sensibilities", deeming Ice Spice's delivery lacking the "rat-a-tat velocity" of her contribution to PinkPantheress's "Boy's a Liar Pt. 2". HotNewHipHop's Aron A. deemed the remix underwhelming for hip-hop fans, and Matthew Dwyer from PopMatters contended on whether Swift had Ice Spice on to remain relevant. However, Billboard and USA Today named the remix one of the best songs of 2023. In Billboard, Andrew Unterberger wrote that while it was not the best single for either Swift or Ice Spice, it could become "genuinely intoxicating" because of its status as the "shared victory lap moment" for both artists. At the 66th Annual Grammy Awards in 2024, the remix was nominated for Best Pop Duo/Group Performance.

== Live performances ==
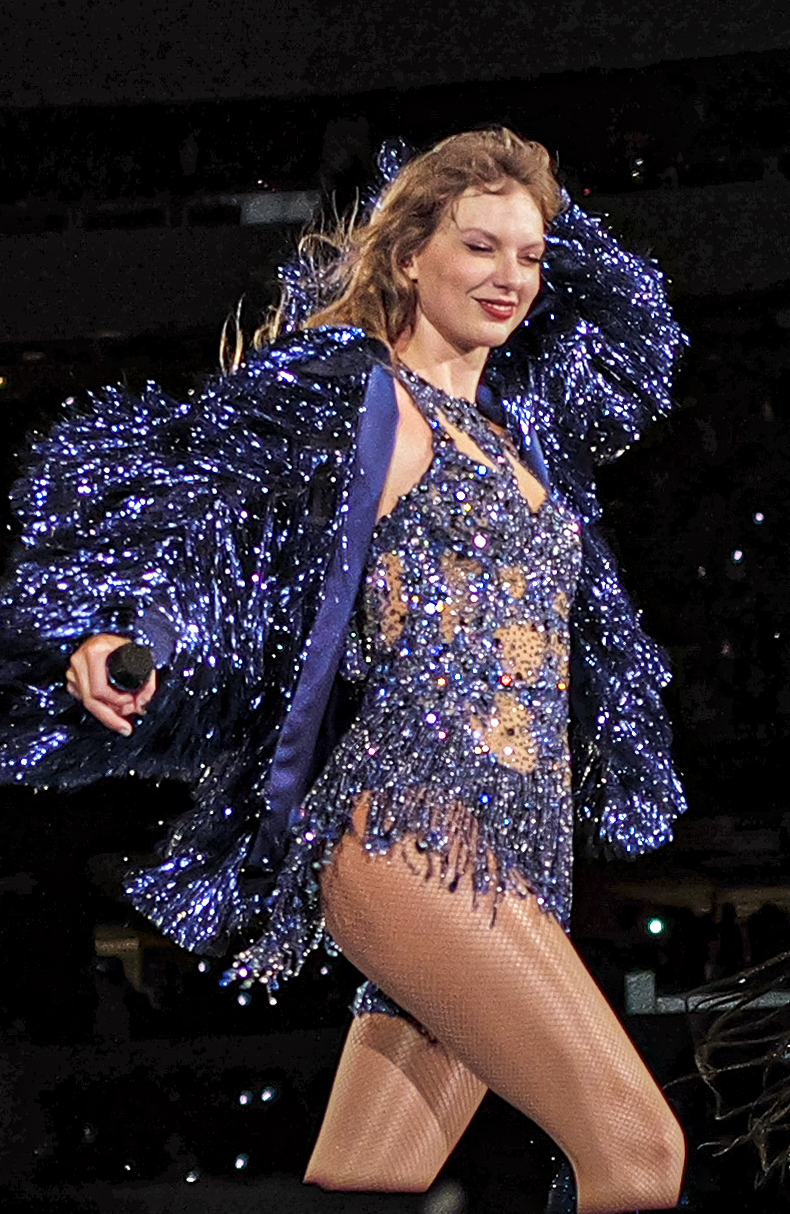
Swift performing "Karma" on the Eras Tour in August 2023

Swift performed "Karma" as the closing song of the Eras Tour (2023–2024). After ending the number, she departed the stage as confetti rained down and fireworks flew above the stage. Waiss Aramesh of Rolling Stone and Mark Savage of BBC News wrote that the song's theme about finding peace and victory was the appropriate closer for the tour, which showcased Swift as having persevered through challenges to reach her stardom. On May 26, 2023, Swift and Ice Spice performed the remix of "Karma" at the Eras Tour concert in East Rutherford, New Jersey.

Beginning with the concert in Buenos Aires, Argentina, on November 11, 2023, Swift occasionally changed one lyric of "Karma" from, "Karma is the guy on the screen coming straight home to me", to, "Karma is the guy on the Chiefs coming straight home to me." This altered lyric referenced her relationship with the football player Travis Kelce, who was playing for the Kansas City Chiefs. She would change this lyric during the concerts where Kelce was in attendance, or when the Kansas City Chiefs had a game during the football season.

== Commercial performance ==
Upon the release of Midnights, nine of its tracks entered the top 10 of the Billboard Global 200 chart; "Karma" debuted at number 10. This set the record for the most simultaneous top-10 entries. The track peaked at number six on the Global 200 chart dated June 10, 2023, spending 53 weeks in total.

In the US, upon the album's release, "Karma" debuted at number nine on the Billboard Hot 100. Together with other Midnights tracks, it made Swift the first artist to monopolize the top 10 of the Hot 100 the same week. Following the release of the Ice Spice remix, "Karma" peaked at number two on the Hot 100. The remix marked Ice Spice's highest-charting single in the US, and "Karma" made Midnights the first album since the Weeknd's After Hours (2020) to have three top-two singles. Unterberger commented that while Ice Spice "covered the one area inside the mainstream that she was no longer really able to touch", she brought to "Karma" a "much-needed freshness", which revitalized its chart performance.

After its radio release, "Karma" became Midnights's third consecutive top-10 single and Swift's 28th overall top-10 song on the Adult Pop Airplay chart, making her the artist with the most top-10 entries. It ultimately became Swift's 10th number one on Adult Pop Airplay (tying her with Pink for the most number ones for a solo artist), and 11th number one on the Pop Airplay chart (tying her with Maroon 5, Katy Perry, and Rihanna for the most number ones).

In the English-speaking countries, "Karma" charted in the top 10 and has received platinum certifications in Australia (number two, five-times platinum), Canada (number four, platinum), and New Zealand (number nine, double platinum). It also peaked at number eight in Ireland and number 12 in the UK, and has been certified platinum in the UK. Elsewhere, the single peaked at number seven in the Philippines, number 12 in Singapore and Slovakia, number 18 in Malaysia, and number 20 in Portugal. It has been certified platinum in Brazil and Mexico, and gold in Denmark, France, Poland, Portugal, and Spain. (Note: References:)

== Music video ==
Swift and Ice Spice holding the Moon and Saturn using mystical lassos

Swift directed the music video for the remix of "Karma". She premiered it at the Eras Tour concert in East Rutherford on May 26, 2023, and released it to YouTube the following day. The video features heavy digital effects, cosmic imagery, and Easter eggs to Swift's other songs and albums; for instance, media publications interpreted her blue nail color and the Roman number "MCMLXXXIX" as Easter eggs pointing to her album 1989. Jennifer Zahn of Vulture called the video "magic-heavy", while Denise Warner of Billboard labelled it "elaborately cinematic".

Swift adopts various attires and personifications in multiple locations, such as: Dorothy on a yellow brick road featured in a Wizard of Oz-themed storybook; a woman dressed in turquoise, backed by an enormous photo of her cat Olivia curled up sleeping; and as a green giantess covered by forest and mountain, whereas Ice Spice is in a cloud formation. Ice Spice delivers her rap verse from inside a golden clamshell. Swift and Ice Spice climb a staircase from opposite sides and lasso the Moon and Saturn. The final scene shows Swift's hands carrying a cup of coffee, the surface of which shows a foam clock.

== Accolades ==
Awards and nominations received by the song
| Award | Year | Category | Result | Ref. |
|---|---|---|---|---|
| MTV Video Music Awards | 2023 | Song of Summer | Nominated | |
| Grammy Awards | 2024 | Best Pop Duo/Group Performance | Nominated | |
| Global Awards | 2024 | Best Song | Nominated | |
| Nickelodeon Kids' Choice Awards | 2024 | Favorite Music Collaboration | Nominated | |
| BMI Pop Awards | 2024 | Most Performed Songs of the Year | Won | |

== Credits and personnel ==
Credits are adapted from the liner notes of Midnights.

Recording

- Recorded at Rough Customer Studio (Brooklyn), Electric Lady Studios (New York City), and Henson Recording Studio (Los Angeles)
- Mixed at MixStar Studios (Virginia Beach, Virginia)
- Mastered at Sterling Sound (Edgewater, New Jersey)
- Sounwave's performance recorded by himself at Sound of Waves Studios (Los Angeles)
- Jahaan Sweet's performance recorded by himself at The Sweet Spot (Los Angeles)
- Keanu Beats's performance recorded by himself (Melbourne, Australia)

Personnel

- Taylor Swift – vocals, songwriter, producer
- Jack Antonoff – songwriter, producer, engineer, drums, programming, percussion, synths, Juno, Omnichord, recording
- Sounwave – songwriter, producer, engineer, programming, recording
- Keanu Beats – songwriter, producer, engineer, synths, recording
- Jahaan Sweet – songwriter, co-producer, engineer, keyboard, synth pad, recording
- Laura Sisk – engineer, recording
- Megan Searl – assistant engineer
- John Sher – assistant engineer
- John Rooney – assistant engineer
- Mark Aguilar – assistant engineer
- Serban Ghenea – mixing
- Bryce Bordone – assistant mix engineer
- Randy Merrill – mastering

== Charts ==
=== Weekly charts ===
Weekly chart performance
| Chart (2022–2023) (Note: Combined charts for the original and remix versions) | Peak position |
|---|---|
| Australia (ARIA) | 2 |
| Canada Hot 100 (Billboard) | 4 |
| Canada AC (Billboard) | 4 |
| Canada CHR/Top 40 (Billboard) | 1 |
| Canada Hot AC (Billboard) | 1 |
| Croatia (HRT) | 44 |
| Czech Republic Singles Digital (ČNS IFPI) | 35 |
| France (SNEP) | 127 |
| Global 200 (Billboard) | 6 |
| Greece International (IFPI) | 12 |
| Ireland (IRMA) | 8 |
| Japan Hot Overseas (Billboard Japan) | 17 |
| Latvia Airplay (LAIPA) | 3 |
| Malaysia (Billboard) | 20 |
| Malaysia International (RIM) | 18 |
| Netherlands (Dutch Top 40) | 26 |
| Netherlands (Single Top 100) | 60 |
| New Zealand (Recorded Music NZ) | 9 |
| Nigeria (TurnTable Top 100) | 57 |
| Norway (VG-lista) | 37 |
| Philippines (Billboard) | 7 |
| Portugal (AFP) | 20 |
| Singapore (RIAS) | 12 |
| Slovakia Singles Digital (ČNS IFPI) | 12 |
| South Africa (Billboard) | 21 |
| Spain (Promusicae) | 66 |
| Sweden (Sverigetopplistan) | 38 |
| Swiss Streaming (Schweizer Hitparade) | 40 |
| UK Singles (Official Charts) | 12 |
| US Billboard Hot 100 | 2 |
| US Adult Contemporary (Billboard) | 9 |
| US Adult Pop Airplay (Billboard) | 1 |
| US Dance Airplay (Billboard) | 13 |
| US Pop Airplay (Billboard) | 1 |
| Vietnam Hot 100 (Billboard) | 25 |

=== Monthly charts ===
Monthly chart performance
| Chart (2023) | Peak position |
|---|---|
| Paraguay (SGP) | 68 |

=== Year-end charts ===
2023 year-end chart performance
| Chart (2023) | Position |
|---|---|
| Australia (ARIA) | 39 |
| Canada (Canadian Hot 100) | 14 |
| Global 200 (Billboard) | 88 |
| UK Singles (OCC) | 99 |
| US Billboard Hot 100 | 27 |
| US Adult Contemporary (Billboard) | 18 |
| US Adult Pop Airplay (Billboard) | 9 |
| US Pop Airplay (Billboard) | 13 |

2024 year-end chart performance
| Chart (2024) | Position |
|---|---|
| US Adult Contemporary (Billboard) | 29 |

== Certifications ==
Certifications
| Region | Certification | Certified units/sales |
|---|---|---|
| Australia (ARIA) | 5× Platinum | 350,000^{‡} |
| Brazil (Pro-Música Brasil) | Platinum | 40,000^{‡} |
| Canada (Music Canada) | Platinum | 80,000^{‡} |
| Denmark (IFPI Danmark) | Gold | 45,000^{‡} |
| France (SNEP) | Gold | 100,000^{‡} |
| Mexico (AMPROFON) | Platinum | 140,000^{‡} |
| New Zealand (RMNZ) | 2× Platinum | 60,000^{‡} |
| Poland (ZPAV) | Gold | 25,000^{‡} |
| Portugal (AFP) | Gold | 5,000^{‡} |
| Spain (Promusicae) | Gold | 30,000^{‡} |
| United Kingdom (BPI) | Platinum | 600,000^{‡} |
^{‡} Sales+streaming figures based on certification alone.

== Release history ==
Release dates and formats
| Region | Date | Format(s) | Version | Label(s) | Ref. |
|---|---|---|---|---|---|
| United States | May 1, 2023 | Hot adult contemporary radio | Original | Republic | |
| United States | May 2, 2023 | Contemporary hit radio | Original | Republic | |
| Italy | May 26, 2023 | Radio airplay | Ice Spice remix | Universal | |
| United States | May 27, 2023 | Digital download; streaming | Ice Spice remix | Republic | |
