= Princess Diana (song) =

- Nicki Minaj remix cover

Single by Ice Spice and Nicki Minaj

from the EP Like..?
- Released: April 14, 2023
- Recorded: 2022 (original); February 2023 (remix)
- Genre: Drill; trap
- Length: 2:35 (original); 2:52 (remix)
- Label: 10K Projects; Capitol; Heavy on It
- Songwriters: Isis Gaston; Ephrem Lopez, Jr.; Onika Maraj (remix)
- Producer: RiotUSA

Ice Spice singles chronology
"Boy's a Liar Pt. 2" (2023)	"Princess Diana" (2023)	"Karma" (2023)

Nicki Minaj singles chronology
"WTF" (2023)	"Princess Diana" (2023)	"Alone" (2023)

Music video
- "Princess Diana" on YouTube

"Princess Diana" is a song by American rapper Ice Spice. It is the second track on her debut extended play, Like..?, released on January 20, 2023, through 10K Projects and Capitol Records. A remix with Nicki Minaj was released as a single on April 14, 2023 and peaked at number four on the Billboard Hot 100, earning Ice Spice her second top-ten hit on the chart and the 22nd top-ten hit for Nicki Minaj.

== Background ==
Ice Spice, a drill rapper from the Bronx, released the single "Munch (Feelin' U)" in August 2022. It went viral on social media and became her breakout song, surpassing 34 million worldwide streams in less than two months and reaching Billboard's US Hot R&B/Hip-Hop Songs chart. Its online success led to her signing with the record label 10K Projects and Capitol Records.

In November 2022, memetic comparisons of Ice Spice to Diana, Princess of Wales, gained traction on Twitter. For example, users reposted split portraits of Ice Spice's and Diana's faces, with each half mashed side by side, across social media. More people solidified the comparison when a video of her and American rapper Lil Tjay surfaced in which they handed Thanksgiving turkeys to people in the Bronx. Ice Spice was called the Princess Diana of her generation and gained the nickname "The People's Princess", a title initially given to Diana after her death following a car crash in August 1997.

Later that month, Ice Spice announced via an interview with podcast Rap Caviar that her debut extended play (EP), Like..? was in the works. Its track list consisted of six songs; it featured "Munch (Feelin' U)" alongside two succeeding singles and three songs yet to be released. One track is named "Princess Diana", a nod to the memes about Ice Spice.

== Release ==
"Princess Diana" was released as a Like..? album track on January 20, 2023. The EP marked Ice Spice's first project under 10K and Capitol. She performed Like..? at Rolling Loud California in March 2023, with "Princess Diana" as the opening song. During her performance, she expressed her adoration for rappers Lil Wayne and Nicki Minaj, both of whom were onstage before her. Ice Spice told the crowd: "I'm standing on the same stage Lil Wayne and my idol Nicki Minaj were less than 24 hours ago, my life is insane."

Minaj reacted to the namedrop on Instagram. Their interactions fueled speculation that the two collaborated on a remix of "Princess Diana".

On April 14, 2023, the remix was released to digital download and streaming services through 10K Projects, Capitol Records and Heavy on It. It became the first-ever release on Minaj's own vanity label, Heavy on It. Edgar Esteves directed the music video for "Princess Diana". It premiered on YouTube at 14:00 UTC on April 14, 2023, and featured appearances from both rappers.

== Accolades ==
Awards and nominations
Organization	Year	Category	Result	Ref.
MTV Video Music Awards	2023	Push Performance of the Year	Nominated	

== Track listings ==
- Streaming/digital download – remix
1. "Princess Diana" (with Nicki Minaj) – 2:52
- Streaming/digital download – versions
1. "Princess Diana" (with Nicki Minaj) – 2:52
2. "Princess Diana" (with Nicki Minaj; extendo clip) – 3:18
3. "Princess Diana" (solo version) – 2:34
4. "Princess Diana" (with Nicki Minaj; sped up) – 2:26
5. "Princess Diana" (with Nicki Minaj; slowed down) – 3:07
6. "Princess Diana" (with Nicki Minaj; instrumental) – 2:52

== Charts ==
=== Weekly charts ===
Chart performance
Chart (2023–2024)	Peak position
Canada Hot 100 (Billboard)	21
France (SNEP)	158
Global 200 (Billboard)	11
Greece International (IFPI)	43
Ireland (IRMA)	25
New Zealand (Recorded Music NZ)	31
Nigeria (TurnTable Top 100)	39
South Africa (TOSAC)	8
Suriname (Nationale Top 40)	26
Sweden Heatseeker (Sverigetopplistan)	15
UK Singles (OCC)	22
UK Hip Hop/R&B (OCC)	10
US Billboard Hot 100	4
US Hot R&B/Hip-Hop Songs (Billboard)	2
US R&B/Hip-Hop Airplay (Billboard)	6
US Rhythmic Airplay (Billboard)	1

=== Year-end charts ===
Year-end chart performance
Chart (2023)	Position
US Billboard Hot 100	69
US Hot R&B/Hip-Hop Songs (Billboard)	23
US Rhythmic (Billboard)	12

== Certifications ==
Certifications
Region	Certification	Certified units/sales
Brazil (Pro-Música Brasil)	Gold	20,000^{‡}
Canada (Music Canada)	Platinum	80,000^{‡}
New Zealand (RMNZ)	Gold	15,000^{‡}
United Kingdom (BPI)	Silver	200,000^{‡}
United States (RIAA)	2× Platinum	2,000,000^{‡}
^{‡} Sales+streaming figures based on certification alone.

== Release history ==
Release dates and formats
Region	Date	Format(s)	Version	Label	Ref.
Various	April 14, 2023	Digital download; streaming	Nicki Minaj remix	10K; Capitol; Heavy on It	
Various	April 18, 2023	Digital download; streaming	Versions EP	10K; Capitol; Heavy on It	
Italy	April 28, 2023	Radio airplay	Nicki Minaj remix	Universal	
