= I Need a Girl (Part One) =

2002 single by P. Diddy featuring Usher and Loon

Single by P. Diddy featuring Usher and Loon

from the album We Invented the Remix
- Released: February 25, 2002
- Length: 4:26
- Label: Bad Boy; Arista
- Songwriters: Sean Combs; Chauncey Hawkins; Mario Winans; Michael Carlos Jones; Adonis Shropshire; Jack Knight
- Producers: Mario Winans; Diddy

P. Diddy singles chronology
"Pass the Courvoisier, Part II" (2002)	"I Need a Girl (Part One)" (2002)	"I Need a Girl (Part Two)" (2002)

Usher singles chronology
"U Don't Have to Call" (2002)	"I Need a Girl (Part One)" (2002)	"U-Turn" (2002)

Loon singles chronology
"Promise (So So Def Remix)" (2000)	"I Need a Girl (Part One)" (2002)	"I Need a Girl (Part Two)" (2002)

Music video
- "I Need a Girl (Part One)" on YouTube

"I Need a Girl (Part One)" is a single by American rapper P. Diddy featuring Usher and Loon from the album We Invented the Remix. In 2004, the song was featured on the Bad Boys compilation R&B Hits. Along with "I Need a Girl (Part Two)", P. Diddy achieved a rare occurrence by having two parts of a song become chart hits. Part one peaked at number two on the US Billboard Hot 100 and number one on the Billboard Hot Rap Tracks chart. It also charted on the UK Singles Chart at number four. The song was ranked number 15 on the Billboard Hot 100 year-end chart in 2002. The song contains a chord progression played on a Roland JV-1080 sound module, using a patch named "Flying Waltz".

== Background ==
Combs revealed that the lyrics in the third verse are about his ex-girlfriend Jennifer Lopez, along with his other ex relationships.

== Music video ==
The music video features mainly Diddy and Usher singing at a house party filled with dancing guests, mostly women. Rappers Craig Mack, DJ Clue and Fabolous make cameo appearances.

== Track listings ==
US 12-inch single
No.	Title	Length
1.	"I Need a Girl (Part One)" (club mix)	4:32
2.	"I Need a Girl (Part One)" (instrumental)	4:31
3.	"I Need a Girl (Part One)" (radio mix)	4:13
4.	"I Need a Girl (Part One)" (acappella)	4:30

UK CD single
No.	Title	Length
1.	"I Need a Girl (Part One)"
2.	"U Don't Have to Call" (remix by Usher featuring Ludacris)
3.	"I Need a Girl (Part Two)" (with Ginuwine featuring Loon, Mario Winans, and Tammy Ruggeri)
4.	"I Need a Girl (Part One)" (video)
5.	"U Don't Have to Call" (LP version video clip)

UK 12-inch single
No.	Title	Length
1.	"I Need a Girl (Part One)"
2.	"U Don't Have to Call" (remix by Usher featuring Ludacris)
3.	"I Need a Girl (Part Two)" (with Ginuwine featuring Loon, Mario Winans, and Tammy Ruggeri)

European CD single
No.	Title	Length
1.	"I Need a Girl (Part One)"
2.	"I Need a Girl (Part Two)" (with Ginuwine featuring Loon, Mario Winans, and Tammy Ruggeri)

European maxi-CD single
No.	Title	Length
1.	"I Need a Girl (Part One)"
2.	"U Don't Have to Call" (by Usher)
3.	"I Need a Girl (Part Two)" (with Ginuwine featuring Loon, Mario Winans, and Tammy Ruggeri)
4.	"U Don't Have to Call" (remix by Usher featuring Ludacris)

Australian CD single
No.	Title	Length
1.	"I Need a Girl (Part One)"
2.	"I Need a Girl (Part Two)" (with Ginuwine featuring Loon, Mario Winans, and Tammy Ruggeri)
3.	"I Need a Girl (To Bella)" (featuring Loon, Mario Winans, and Lo & Jack)
4.	"I Need a Girl (Part One)" (video)

== Charts ==
=== Weekly charts ===
Weekly chart performance for "I Need a Girl (Part One)"
Chart (2002)	Peak position
Australia (ARIA)	5
Australian Urban (ARIA)	2
Austria (Ö3 Austria Top 40)	32
Belgium (Ultratop 50 Flanders)	12
Belgium (Ultratop 50 Wallonia)	9
Denmark (Tracklisten)	6
Europe (Eurochart Hot 100)	6
France (SNEP)	9
Germany (GfK)	8
Hungary (Single Top 40)	11
Ireland (IRMA)	25
Netherlands (Dutch Top 40)	3
Netherlands (Single Top 100)	5
New Zealand (Recorded Music NZ)	9
Norway (VG-lista)	13
Scotland Singles (Official Charts)	14
Sweden (Sverigetopplistan)	17
Switzerland (Schweizer Hitparade)	5
UK Singles (Official Charts)	4
US Billboard Hot 100	2
US Hot R&B/Hip-Hop Songs (Billboard)	2
US Hot Rap Songs (Billboard)	1
US Pop Airplay (Billboard)	2
US Rhythmic Airplay (Billboard)	2

=== Year-end charts ===
Year-end chart performance for "I Need a Girl (Part One)"
Chart (2002)	Position
Australia (ARIA)	59
Australian Urban (ARIA)	11
Belgium (Ultratop 50 Flanders)	53
Belgium (Ultratop 50 Wallonia)	36
Canada (Nielsen SoundScan) Parts 1 & 2	37
Europe (Eurochart Hot 100)	43
France (SNEP)	73
Germany (Media Control)	47
Netherlands (Dutch Top 40)	4
Netherlands (Single Top 100)	26
Switzerland (Schweizer Hitparade)	10
UK Singles (OCC)	77
US Billboard Hot 100	15
US Hot R&B/Hip-Hop Singles & Tracks (Billboard)	20
US Hot Rap Tracks (Billboard)	8
US Mainstream Top 40 (Billboard)	33
US Rhythmic Top 40 (Billboard)	7

== Certifications ==
Certifictions and sales for "I Need a Girl (Part One)"
Region	Certification	Certified units/sales
Australia (ARIA)	Gold	35,000^{^}
New Zealand (RMNZ)	Gold	5,000^{*}
Switzerland (IFPI Switzerland)	Gold	20,000^{^}
United Kingdom (BPI) "I Need a Girl (To Bella)"	Silver	200,000^{‡}
^{*} Sales figures based on certification alone.^{^} Shipments figures based on certification alone.^{‡} Sales+streaming figures based on certification alone.

== Release history ==
Release dates and formats for "I Need a Girl (Part One)"
Region	Date	Format(s)	Label(s)	Ref.
United States	February 25, 2002	Rhythmic contemporary; urban radio	Bad Boy	
United States	April 1, 2002	Contemporary hit radio	Bad Boy	
Denmark	May 20, 2002	CD	Bad Boy; Arista	
Sweden	May 20, 2002	CD	Bad Boy; Arista	
Australia	June 17, 2002	CD	Bad Boy; Arista	
United Kingdom	July 29, 2002	12-inch vinyl; CD; cassette	Bad Boy; Arista	
