= In Ha Mood =

Single by Ice Spice

from the EP Like..?
- Released: January 6, 2023
- Recorded: 2022
- Genre: Brooklyn drill
- Length: 2:09
- Label: 10K Projects; Capitol
- Songwriters: Isis Gaston; Ephrem Lopez, Jr.
- Producer: RiotUSA

Ice Spice singles chronology
"Bikini Bottom" (2022)	"In Ha Mood" (2023)	"Boy's a Liar Pt. 2" (2023)

Visualizer
- "In Ha Mood" on YouTube

"In Ha Mood" ('in her mood') is a song by American rapper Ice Spice. Produced by RiotUSA, it was released on January 6, 2023, by 10K Projects and Capitol Records. It is the third single from her Like..? EP.

== Background and release ==
On December 21, 2022, Ice Spice first teased her single on a TikTok video, which amassed views from her fans. Four days later, Ice Spice premiered "In Ha Mood" on YouTube and SoundCloud. That same day American rapper Chance the Rapper took to his Instagram story to question if the song's lyric: "He a rapper but don't get a chance" was a reference to him. Ice Spice later clarified that the lyrics were unrelated to the rapper.

== Composition ==
"In Ha Mood" was produced by RiotUSA, who has produced all previous Ice Spice singles. In the song, Ice Spice speaks about a man attempting to persuade her to stay with him, despite her desire to go to parties and enjoy herself. She also continues to flaunt her popularity when she steps out of her comfort zone.

== Music video ==
On January 16, 2023, she was seen recording the music video to "In Ha Mood" in The Bronx after initially planning to record the music video to her song "Gangsta Boo" with American rapper Lil Tjay which was interrupted by the latter's arrest during the video shoot. On January 28, 2023, she released the music video to her song. The video was directed by Oliver Cannon and Chris Villa. In it, the Bronx drill rapper can be seen cruising around New York in a Jeep and rapping along to the song while shooting a wintery promo.

== Live performances and other usage ==
Ice Spice debuted the first-televised performance of the song during her appearance for Saturday Night Live on October 14, 2023.

In July 2026, Ice Spice released her In Ha Mood Eau de Parfum through the Ulta Beauty TikTok Shop, named after the song.

== Charts ==
=== Weekly charts ===
Weekly chart performance for "In Ha Mood"
Chart (2022–2023)	Peak position
Australia Hitseekers (ARIA)	4
Canada Hot 100 (Billboard)	69
Global 200 (Billboard)	192
Ireland (IRMA)	66
New Zealand Hot Singles (RMNZ)	22
UK Singles (Official Charts)	58
UK Hip Hop/R&B (Official Charts)	39
US Billboard Hot 100	58
US Hot R&B/Hip-Hop Songs (Billboard)	18
US Rhythmic Airplay (Billboard)	8

=== Year-end charts ===
Year-end chart performance for "In Ha Mood"
Chart (2023)	Position
US Hot R&B/Hip-Hop Songs (Billboard)	47
US Rhythmic (Billboard)	39

== Certifications ==
Certifications for "In Ha Mood"
Region	Certification	Certified units/sales
Canada (Music Canada)	Platinum	80,000^{‡}
New Zealand (RMNZ)	Gold	15,000^{‡}
United States (RIAA)	Platinum	1,000,000^{‡}
^{‡} Sales+streaming figures based on certification alone.
