= I Need a Girl (Part Two) =

2002 single by P. Diddy

Single by P. Diddy and Ginuwine featuring Loon, Mario Winans, and Tammy Ruggeri

from the album We Invented the Remix
- Released: May 21, 2002
- Recorded: 2001
- Genre: Hip hop; R&B
- Length: 4:46
- Label: Bad Boy; Arista
- Songwriters: Sean Combs; Chauncey Hawkins; Mario Winans; Frankie Romano; Michael Carlos Jones; Adonis Shropshire
- Producers: Mario Winans; Diddy

P. Diddy singles chronology
"I Need a Girl (Part One)" (2002)	"I Need a Girl (Part Two)" (2002)	"Bump, Bump, Bump" (2002)

Ginuwine singles chronology
"Tribute to a Woman" (2002)	"I Need a Girl (Part Two)" (2002)	"Crush Tonight" (2002)

Loon singles chronology
"I Need a Girl (Part One)" (2002)	"I Need a Girl (Part Two)" (2002)	"I Do (Wanna Get Close to You)" (2002)

Mario Winans singles chronology
"Best Friends" (2003)	"I Need a Girl (Part Two)" (2002)	"Down 4 Me" (2003)

Music video
- "I Need a Girl (Part Two)" on YouTube

Audio
- "I Need a Girl (Part Two)" on YouTube

"I Need a Girl (Part Two)" is a single by American rapper P. Diddy. It was released on May 21, 2002 as the second single from Diddy's and Bad Boy Records' remix album, We Invented the Remix (2002). It is a sequel to the single "I Need a Girl (Part One)", released a few months prior. The song includes guest appearances from Ginuwine, Loon, Mario Winans and Tammy Ruggeri. It was written by Sean Combs, Chauncey Hawkins, Mario Winans, Frankie Romano, Michael Carlos Jones and Adonis Shropshire and produced by Mario Winans and Diddy. Just like with "I Need a Girl (Part One)", the music video was directed by Benny Boom.

"Part Two" peaked at number four on the US Billboard Hot 100 and number two on the Billboard Hot Rap Tracks chart. It also charted on the UK Singles Chart at number four. With the song's success on the charts, P. Diddy achieved the rare occurrence of having both parts of the song become big hits.

== Background ==
It samples P. Diddy's line "Now the Sun don't shine for ever, but as long as it's here then we might as well shine together" from his 1997 song "Victory" featuring The Notorious B.I.G. and Busta Rhymes from his debut album No Way Out (1997), released under the stage name Puff Daddy.

== Sequels ==
On February 17, 2012, Mario Winans and German rapper Kay One released a "Part Three" to the song. In Germany, "Part Three" peaked at number 29.

A female-themed equivalent of the song was released by Dani and Phaedra, titled "I'm That Girl".

Tyga recorded a part three from the song on his 2018 album Kyoto.

Diddy’s later collaboration with Ozuna and DJ Snake, "Eres Top" (from Ozuna’s Nibiru album), samples the main instrumental hook from "I Need A Girl (Part Two)".

== Samples ==
The song is sampled in James Hype's 2022 song "Ferrari", Danny Brown and JPEGMafia's 2023 song "Lean Beef Patty", and Ice Spice's 2023 song Gangsta Boo".

== Track listing ==
CD-Maxi

No.	Title	Length
1.	"I Need A Girl (Part One)"	4.14
2.	"U Don't Have to Call" (Usher)	3:54
3.	"I Need A Girl (Part Two)" (with Ginuwine featuring Loon, Mario Winans, and Tammy Ruggeri)	4.48
4.	"U Don't Have To Call (Remix)" (Usher feat. Ludacris)	4:18
5.	"I Need A Girl (2002)" (Video)
6.	"U Don't Have To Call" (Video)

== Charts ==
=== Weekly charts ===
Weekly chart performance for "I Need a Girl (Part Two)"
Chart (2002–2003)	Peak position
Canada (Nielsen SoundScan)	3
Ireland (IRMA)	25
Netherlands (Dutch Top 40)	3
UK Singles (Official Charts)	4
US Billboard Hot 100	4
US Hot R&B/Hip-Hop Songs (Billboard)	2
US Hot Rap Songs (Billboard)	2
US Pop Airplay (Billboard)	10
US Rhythmic Airplay (Billboard)	1

=== Year-end charts ===
Year-end chart performance for "I Need a Girl (Part Two)
Chart (2002)	Position
Canada (Nielsen SoundScan) Parts 1 & 2	37
US Billboard Hot 100	18
US Hot R&B/Hip-Hop Songs (Billboard)	14

== Certifications ==
Region	Certification	Certified units/sales
New Zealand (RMNZ)	Platinum	30,000^{‡}
United Kingdom (BPI)	Gold	400,000^{‡}
^{‡} Sales+streaming figures based on certification alone.
