= Bikini Bottom (song) =

Single by Ice Spice

from the EP Like..?
- Released: October 28, 2022
- Genre: Drill; pop rap
- Length: 1:46
- Label: WorldStar
- Songwriters: Isis Gaston; Ephrem Lopez Jr.
- Producer: RiotUSA

Ice Spice singles chronology
"Munch (Feelin' U)" (2022)	"Bikini Bottom" (2022)	"In Ha Mood" (2023)

"Bikini Bottom" is a song by American rapper Ice Spice. It was released on October 28, 2022, through 10K Projects.

== Background and release ==
Ice Spice released her debut single, "Munch (Feelin' U)", in August 2022. The song went viral on social media platforms, after which Ice Spice signed with the record label 10K Projects. In early October, Ice Spice posted a snippet of a new song, "Bikini Bottom", on her social media platforms. The less-serious nature of the song's beat was compared by the public to background music in the American animated television series SpongeBob SquarePants, which the song gets its title from. The musician has cited the series' titular character as someone who was "very integrated in my life." Kenna McCafferty opined in Paper that "it [...] helps that Ice Spice can take a joke". The song was released on October 28.

== Composition ==
"Bikini Bottom" was produced by RiotUSA, who also produced Ice Spice's debut single "Munch (Feelin' U)". The song, which is under two minutes in length, features Ice Spice calmly rapping over a beat reminiscent of the strings present on a song featured in SpongeBob SquarePants, which the song's title references.

== Critical reception ==
Heven Haile in Pitchfork called the song "whimsical and fun", further opining that Ice Spice's lack of seriousness plays to her strengths.

== Charts ==
Chart performance for "Bikini Bottom"
Chart (2022)	Peak position
New Zealand Hot Singles (RMNZ)	29

== Certifications ==
Certifications for "Bikini Bottom"
Region	Certification	Certified units/sales
United States (RIAA)	Gold	500,000^{‡}
^{‡} Sales+streaming figures based on certification alone.
