= Boy's a Liar Pt. 2 =

Single by PinkPantheress and Ice Spice

from the album Heaven Knows
- B-side: "Boy's a Liar"
- Released: 3 February 2023
- Genre: Dance-pop; bubblegum pop; synth-pop; club; rap; plugg
- Length: 2:11
- Label: Parlophone; Elektra; 3EE
- Songwriters: Victoria Walker; Isis Gaston; Alexander Crossan
- Producers: PinkPantheress; Mura Masa

PinkPantheress singles chronology
"Way Back" (2023)	"Boy's a Liar Pt. 2" (2023)	"Turn Your Phone Off" (2023)

Ice Spice singles chronology
"In Ha Mood" (2023)	"Boy's a Liar Pt. 2" (2023)	"Princess Diana" (2023)

Music video
- "Boy's a Liar Pt. 2" on YouTube

"Boy's a Liar Pt. 2" (stylised in sentence case) is a single by British singer-songwriter and record producer PinkPantheress and American rapper Ice Spice. It was released on 3 February 2023 as a remix of PinkPantheress's earlier song "Boy's a Liar".

Commercially, the song reached number one in New Zealand, number three in the United States, the top ten in seven additional countries, and number three on the Billboard Global 200, becoming the first top-ten hit for both artists. It has been certified Gold or higher in eight countries.

== Background ==
After Ice Spice posted the original version of "Boy's a Liar" on her Instagram story, PinkPantheress replied asking to collaborate, hoping to "culturally ... stamp this song into [2023]". PinkPantheress used the stems of the instrumental by Mura Masa, who was uninvolved in the remix, to produce the remix. "Boy's a Liar Pt. 2" was released on 3 February 2023 through Parlophone, Elektra Records, and 3EE as the lead single of PinkPantheress's debut studio album Heaven Knows.

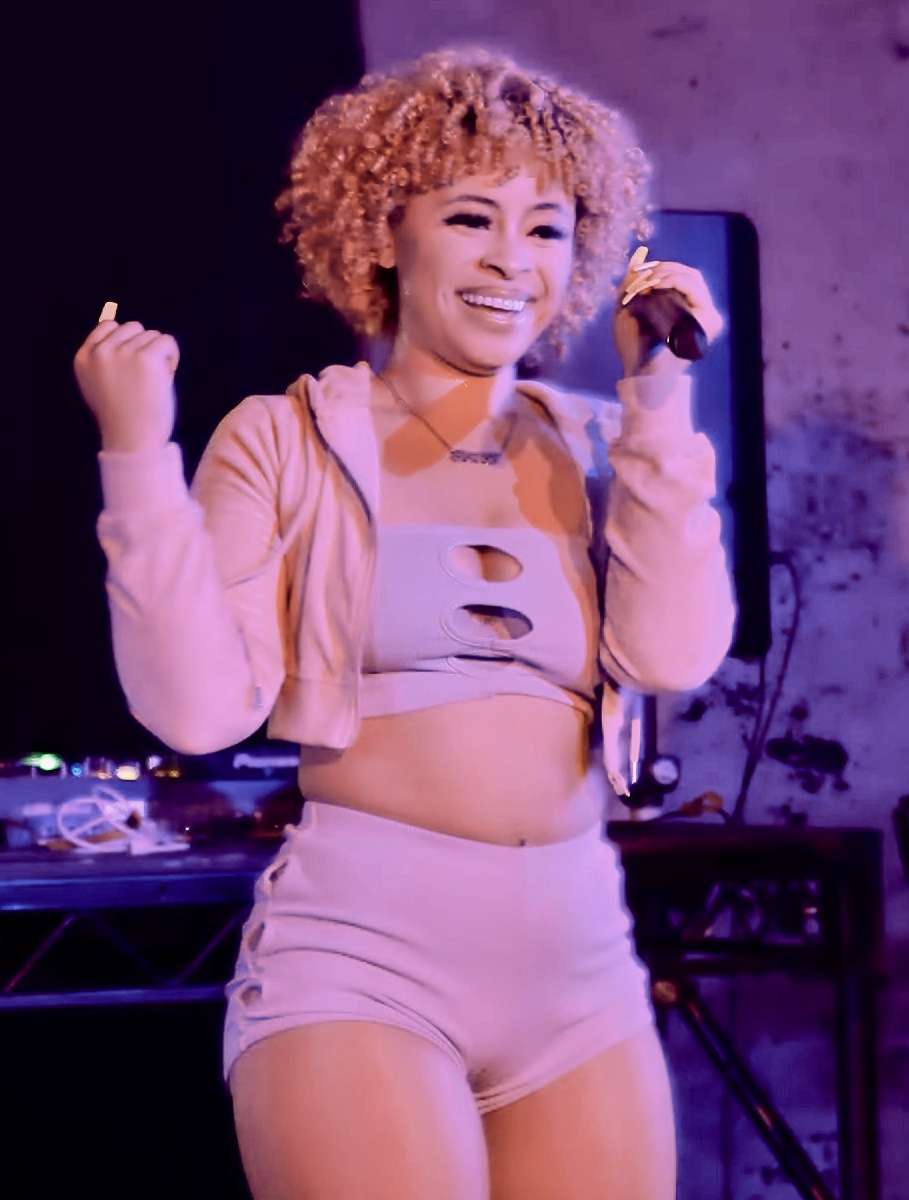
Ice Spice has a verse in "Boy's a Liar Pt. 2"

"Boy's a Liar Pt. 2" is largely the same as the original song with the exception of the second verse, which is replaced by an additional verse from Ice Spice. In contrast with PinkPantheress's "timid fragility", Ice Spice raps with a "raspy voice" and a "collected, indifferent delivery" about a deceitful lover who is already in a relationship. She ends her verse by "drop[ping] her invulnerable posture", rapping, "But I don't sleep enough without you/And I can't eat enough without you".

== Music video and promotion ==
The music video for "Boy's a Liar Pt. 2" was directed by George and Frederick Buford, filmed in the middle of January 2023 throughout New York City, on the rooftop of a Harlem apartment building, on a fire escape, and on a subway car. "Boy's a Liar Pt. 2" was promoted by Warner by allowing social media influencers to make reactions to the song. Two mannequins dressed as Ice Spice and PinkPantheress were also placed on a rooftop in Central London in early March 2023 in promotion of the song.

== Commercial performance ==
"Boy's a Liar Pt. 2" debuted at number 14 on the Billboard Hot 100 chart on 17 February 2023. It became Mura Masa and PinkPantheress's first entries on the Hot 100. The following week, the song rose to number four on the chart, marking the first top-10 entry on the chart for both Ice Spice and PinkPantheress. It was the first duet between two artists making their top-10 debut to reach the top-10 in two weeks or less since "Calling My Phone" by Lil Tjay and 6lack debuted at number three in February 2021. It peaked at number three the next week. The song also debuted at number 15 on the Billboard Global 200 chart, where it peaked at number three two weeks after its debut. Elsewhere, it topped the chart in New Zealand and peaked at number two in Canada. "Boy's a Liar Pt. 2" was certified platinum by the Recording Industry Association of America (RIAA).

== Critical reception ==
For NPR, Hazel Cills wrote that "Boy's a Liar Pt. 2" "encapsulated all the things PinkPantheress does best: sweet and salty minimalist pop with a deep, emotional core at close listen", while LaTesha Harris praised it as "never overstay[ing] its welcome", calling Ice Spice's verse "funny". Alex Hudson of Exclaim! wrote that "Boy's a Liar Pt. 2" had an "astonishing" hook and a "wore down magic" that "easily outshines the rest of [Heaven Knows] despite being far simpler in every way"; Clash's Amrit Virdi called it "a wholesome and fun ending to the record". For Dork, Abigail Firth wrote that adding the song to the end of the album was "unnecessary" and "the only part of Heaven Knows that feels like an afterthought". For Pitchfork, Matthew Ritchie called "Boy's a Liar Pt. 2" "an impeccable team-up from a baddie and her baddie friend" and Colin Joyce described it as "a pillowy, pastel-hued club cut" that "represented PinkPantheress pushing at the boundaries of her ambition". Complex's Joe Price wrote that "Ice Spice effortlessly blends into the track on the remix" and Stereogum's Tom Breihan wrote that the song "works" and that there was "something really fun about the idea of PinkPantheress and Ice Spice making music together". Spencer Kornhaber of The Atlantic wrote that "Boy's a Liar Pt. 2" was "undeniably catchy and yet feels as fleeting as a mild dream" and that what was "most remarkable about the song" was "its featherweight feeling". For Vulture, Reanna Cruz wrote that "Boy's a Liar Pt. 2" "serves as a bridge between the hack-iness of sped-up trend hopping and genuine artistic needle-pushing". Paul Simpson of AllMusic praised the song as a "joyous dance-pop delight".

Rolling Stone, Vulture, The Week, and American Songwriter considered the absence of "Boy's a Liar Pt. 2" from the nominations for the 66th Annual Grammy Awards, particularly in the Record of the Year, Song of the Year, and Best New Artist (for PinkPantheress) categories, to be a snub.

== Charts ==
=== Weekly charts ===
Chart performance for "Boy's a Liar Pt. 2"
Chart (2023–2024)	Peak position
Austria (Ö3 Austria Top 40)	28
Belgium (Ultratop 50 Flanders)	46
Canada Hot 100 (Billboard)	2
Croatia (Billboard)	17
Czech Republic Singles Digital (ČNS IFPI)	37
Denmark (Tracklisten)	13
Finland (Suomen virallinen lista)	39
France (SNEP)	79
Germany (GfK)	32
Global 200 (Billboard)	3
Greece International (IFPI)	7
Iceland (Tónlistinn)	6
Latvia (LaIPA)	2
Lithuania (AGATA)	3
Luxembourg (Billboard)	8
Malaysia (Billboard)	14
Netherlands (Dutch Top 40)	31
Netherlands (Single Top 100)	18
New Zealand (Recorded Music NZ)	1
Nigeria (TurnTable Top 100)	32
Norway (VG-lista)	10
Panama (Monitor Latino)	18
Paraguay (Monitor Latino)	15
Philippines (Billboard)	8
Poland (Polish Streaming Top 100)	32
Portugal (AFP)	31
San Marino (SMRRTV Top 50)	45
Slovakia (Singles Digitál Top 100)	20
South Africa (Billboard)	13
Sweden (Sverigetopplistan)	15
Switzerland (Schweizer Hitparade)	18
US Billboard Hot 100	3
US Adult Pop Airplay (Billboard)	37
US Dance Airplay (Billboard)	17
US Pop Airplay (Billboard)	7
US Rhythmic Airplay (Billboard)	1
US R&B/Hip-Hop Airplay (Billboard)	35
Vietnam (Vietnam Hot 100)	39

=== Year-end charts ===
Year-end chart performance for "Boy's a Liar Pt. 2"
Chart (2023)	Position
Canada (Canadian Hot 100)	22
Global 200 (Billboard)	26
New Zealand (Recorded Music NZ)	5
US Billboard Hot 100	20
US Mainstream Top 40 (Billboard)	29
US Rhythmic (Billboard)	11

== Certifications ==
Certifications for "Boy's a Liar Pt. 2"
Region	Certification	Certified units/sales
Austria (IFPI Austria)	Gold	15,000^{‡}
Canada (Music Canada)	3× Platinum	240,000^{‡}
Denmark (IFPI Danmark)	Gold	45,000^{‡}
France (SNEP)	Platinum	200,000^{‡}
Italy (FIMI)	Gold	50,000^{‡}
Poland (ZPAV)	Platinum	50,000^{‡}
Portugal (AFP)	Gold	5,000^{‡}
United States (RIAA)	Platinum	1,000,000^{‡}
^{‡} Sales+streaming figures based on certification alone.
