= Munch (Feelin' U) =

2022 single by Ice Spice

Single by Ice Spice

from the EP Like..?
- Released: August 10, 2022
- Recorded: January 2022
- Genre: Drill
- Length: 1:44
- Label: WorldStar
- Songwriters: Isis Gaston; Ephrem Lopez Jr.
- Producer: RiotUSA

Ice Spice singles chronology
"Euphoric" (2022)	"Munch (Feelin' U)" (2022)	"Bikini Bottom" (2022)

Music video
- "Munch (Feelin' U)" on YouTube

"Munch (Feelin' U)" is a song by American rapper Ice Spice, released on August 10, 2022. A music video accompanied the song. The song trended on TikTok. It was later released as the lead single from the debut EP Like..?.

== Composition ==
"Munch (Feelin' U)" is a drill song. Lyrically, Ice Spice raps about a man who dotes on her while she selfishly gets what she wants from him, addressing him as the slang term "munch": "You thought I was feelin' you? / That nigga a munch". Pitchfork's Ryan Dombal called on Merriam-Webster to introduce Ice Spice's definition of the word, a "particularly clueless kind of guy—a dummy, a sucker, a simp", into its dictionaries.

== Release and promotion ==
When Ice Spice announced the song on social media, she shared a screenshot revealing that she had received a cosign from Canadian rapper Drake as a result of the track. Upon its release, the song quickly began trending on the video-sharing app TikTok.

== Critical reception ==
The song received generally positive reviews. Writing for The Fader, David Renshaw praised Ice Spice's "effortless confidence" in the song and commented, "she flexes for two minutes straight, offering up quotable lines ('You know my body, I do it with ease') and outsized comic imagery ('I'm walkin' past him, he sniffin' my breeze')". Jon Caramanica of The New York Times wrote, "In a frenzied genre, she's a calm rapper, which is part of what makes this song so frosty—the beat is skittish and portentous, but Ice Spice sounds at peace. She's rhyming quickly, but also calmly and slightly dismissively, probably because of the subject matter."

Pitchfork ranked the song the 30th best of 2022, praising how Ice Spice "balances her brashness with a supremely unbothered delivery, as if she's been swatting away munches for decades. Centuries, even"; in September 2024, they included it on their list of "The 100 Best Songs of the 2020s So Far", ranking it at number 41.

== Music video ==
The video for the song was directed by George Buford and features Ice Spice dancing with a group of friends and supporters in various locations in The Bronx, such as at a park, in front of Paya Deli, and at a photoshoot.

== Charts ==
Chart performance for "Munch (Feelin' U)"
Chart (2022)	Peak position
US Bubbling Under Hot 100 (Billboard)	5
US Hot R&B/Hip-Hop Songs (Billboard)	34
US Rhythmic Airplay (Billboard)	27

== Certifications ==
Certifications for "Munch (Feelin' U)"
Region	Certification	Certified units/sales
Canada (Music Canada)	Gold	40,000^{‡}
United States (RIAA)	Platinum	1,000,000^{‡}
^{‡} Sales+streaming figures based on certification alone.

== See also ==
- No Scrubs, 1999 single by TLC
