= RiotUSA =

American record producer

- Also known as: Riot; RiotUSA '22
- Born: Ephrem Louis Lopez Jr. 2000 or 2001 (age 25–26); Manhattan, New York City, U.S.
- Origin: The Bronx, New York City, U.S.
- Genres: Hip-hop; Bronx drill; mumble rap
- Occupations: Record producer; songwriter; rapper
- Years active: 2021–present
- Father: DJ Enuff

Ephrem Louis Lopez Jr., known professionally as RiotUSA, is an American record producer and songwriter of Puerto Rican descent. Born in Manhattan, he is best known for his musical productions for rapper Ice Spice, whom he met in 2021 at the State University of New York at Purchase.

RiotUSA first gained major recognition in late 2022 after producing Ice Spice's breakout single "Munch (Feelin' U)", along with her follow-up singles "Bikini Bottom" and "In Ha Mood". He co-wrote and produced the entirety of her debut extended play, Like..? (2023), while also serving as executive producer on the project. That same year, he produced and co-wrote "Barbie World" (with Nicki Minaj and Aqua) from the soundtrack to the 2023 film Barbie, and co-wrote the remix of "Karma", by Taylor Swift featuring Ice Spice.

== Early life ==
Ephrem Louis Lopez Jr. was born in Manhattan. His father is DJ Enuff, a radio personality and disc jockey known for his work on New York City's Hot 97 and for being the Notorious B.I.G.'s road DJ. His mother also worked in the music industry. He started making beats in GarageBand when he was ten years old.

Lopez attended State University of New York at Purchase, where he studied communications and later met his future collaborator Ice Spice.

== Career ==
Riot met Ice Spice in 2021, and the two started collaborating soon after. He produced her debut song, "Bully Freestyle", released in March 2021.

On August 10, 2022, Ice Spice released her song "Munch (Feelin' U)", produced by RiotUSA. The song gained popularity after getting support from Drake, and subsequently went viral on Twitter and TikTok. It peaked at No. 5 and 34 on Billboard's Bubbling Under Hot 100 and Hot R&B/Hip-Hop Songs charts, respectively.

Ice Spice's debut EP, Like..? was released on January 20, 2023. In addition to serving as executive producer, RiotUSA produced and co-wrote every track on the project. Later the same year, he signed a global publishing deal with Warner Chappell Music.

In 2025, RiotUSA also co-produced Nettspend's "Stressed".

In 2026, Riot produced American influencer IShowSpeed's "World Cup (Champions)" among others.

== Awards and nominations ==
Year	Ceremony	Award	Result	Ref
2024	66th Annual Grammy Awards	Best Song Written for Visual Media ("Barbie World")	Nominated	
2024	66th Annual Grammy Awards	Best Rap Song ("Barbie World")	Nominated	
