= Ice Spice =

American rapper and songwriter (born 2000)

- Ice Spice in 2025

Background information
- Born: Isis Naija Gaston; January 1, 2000 (age 26); The Bronx, New York City, U.S.
- Genres: Hip-hop; Bronx drill
- Occupations: Rapper; songwriter
- Works: Discography
- Years active: 2020–present
- Labels: 10K Projects; Capitol; Polydor
- Website: icespicemusic.com

Isis Naija Gaston (born January 1, 2000), known professionally as Ice Spice, is an American rapper and songwriter. Born and raised in the Bronx, New York City, she began her musical career during college in 2020, after meeting record producer RiotUSA.

Ice Spice gained major recognition in late 2022 with her song "Munch (Feelin' U)", which went viral on TikTok. After signing with 10K Projects in a joint venture with Capitol Records, she released the singles "Bikini Bottom" and "In Ha Mood" to promote her debut extended play (EP), Like..? (2023). The EP spawned the Billboard Hot 100-top ten single "Princess Diana" (with Nicki Minaj), and peaked at number 15 on the Billboard 200. She released multiple collaborative single that same year: "Boy's a Liar Pt. 2" (with PinkPantheress), "Karma" (with Taylor Swift), and "Barbie World" (with Nicki Minaj and Aqua), all of which peaked within the top-ten of the Billboard Hot 100. This made Ice Spice the only rapper to release four songs that achieved top-ten status in 2023. Her 2024 singles, "Think U the Shit (Fart)" and "Did It First" (with Central Cee), preceded the release of her debut studio album, Y2K! (2024).

She is the recipient of several accolades, including the MTV Video Music Award for Best New Artist, the People's Choice Award for New Artist of the Year, and the Impact Award from the BMI R&B/Hip-Hop Awards. Outside of music, she had roles in the films Highest 2 Lowest and The SpongeBob Movie: Search for SquarePants (both 2025).

== Early life and education ==
Isis Naija Gaston was born on January 1, 2000, in the Bronx, New York City. Her father, Joseph Gaston, is African-American, while her mother, Charina Almanzar, is Dominican. The two met at a McDonald's in New York; Joseph was an underground rapper, and Charina worked at a car dealership. Charina was seventeen when she gave birth to Gaston. The two divorced when she was two years old. Gaston has five younger half-siblings: three sisters from her mother's side, as well as another sister and only brother from her father.

Gaston spent much of her childhood with her grandparents and cousins in Fordham, Bronx. They moved out of Davidson Ave in 2007 and moved to University. She went to school in the Bronx until the 5th grade, and to a Catholic Sacred Heart High School in Yonkers, where she graduated in 2018. At age seven, she took a liking to hip-hop after listening to rappers like Lil' Kim, Nicki Minaj, and others. French Montana used to visit her elementary school when Isis was in the fourth grade. She wrote poetry and freestyle raps from then to high school. In an interview with Billboard, Isis explained that she grew up listening to the likes of Jay-Z, 50 Cent, and Wu-Tang Clan because of her father's rap background. She would type out lyrics in the Notes app of her iPhone, listening to hip-hop instrumentals and rapping out loud to them. Gaston explained: "When I saw Nicki [Minaj], I was so mesmerized. She's the first female rapper that I seen. And ever since then, I was kinda set on what I wanted to be." She chose Ice Spice as her stage name while she was a freshman in high school.

Gaston attended the State University of New York at Purchase, where she was a defensive specialist on the school's volleyball team and studied communications. In seven matches, she had two kills and nine digs in the 2018 season. Around her sophomore year, Gaston dropped out of SUNY Purchase, later explaining that she did not believe the school was the right fit for her, and attributing her leaving college to the "strenuous commute". She worked as a cashier at Wendy's and The Gap. She also attempted to work at a local street market in the Bronx area, but quit after one day of working.

== Career ==
=== 2020–2022: Career beginnings ===
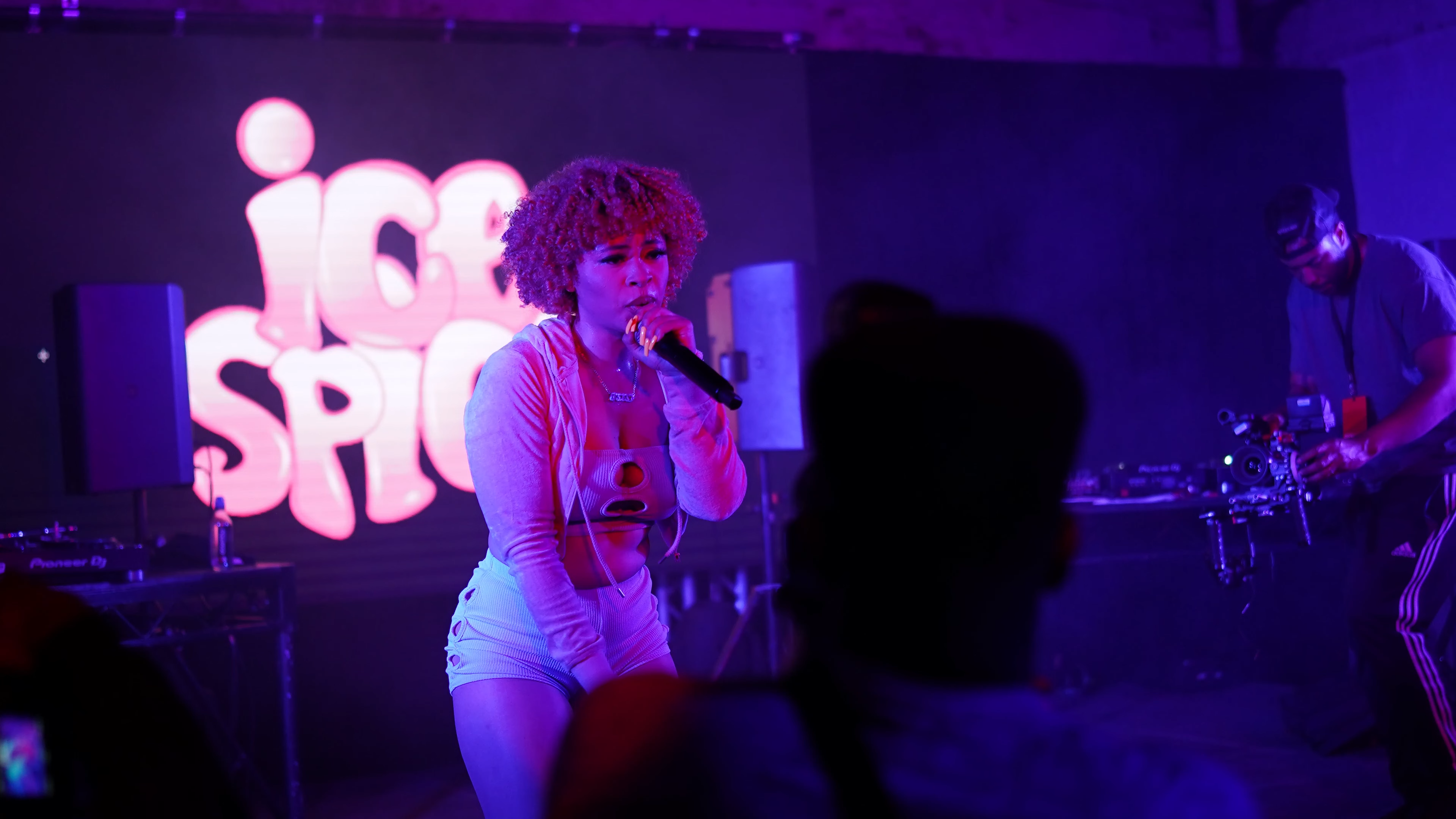
Ice Spice performing in 2022

Ice Spice started rapping in 2020 after meeting with a record producer, RiotUSA. He produced her debut song, "Bully Freestyle", released in March 2021 after a video of Ice Spice doing the "Buss It" challenge went viral on Twitter. Her song "Name of Love" gained traction on SoundCloud, which led to her becoming popular on Instagram.

On August 10, 2022, Ice Spice released her song "Munch (Feelin' U)", accompanied with a video distributed by WorldStarHipHop, as the lead single from her then-untitled debut EP, Like..?. The song gained popularity after getting support from Drake, who played the song on his SiriusXM radio station, Sound 42. It subsequently went viral on Twitter and TikTok, and charted on Billboard's Hot R&B/Hip-Hop Songs and Bubbling Under Hot 100 charts. In September 2022, Ice Spice appeared as a featured artist on the song "One Time" by B-Lovee. Later that month, she signed a record deal with 10K Projects and Capitol Records. On October 28, she released the single "Bikini Bottom".

=== 2023–present: Breakthrough with Like..? ===
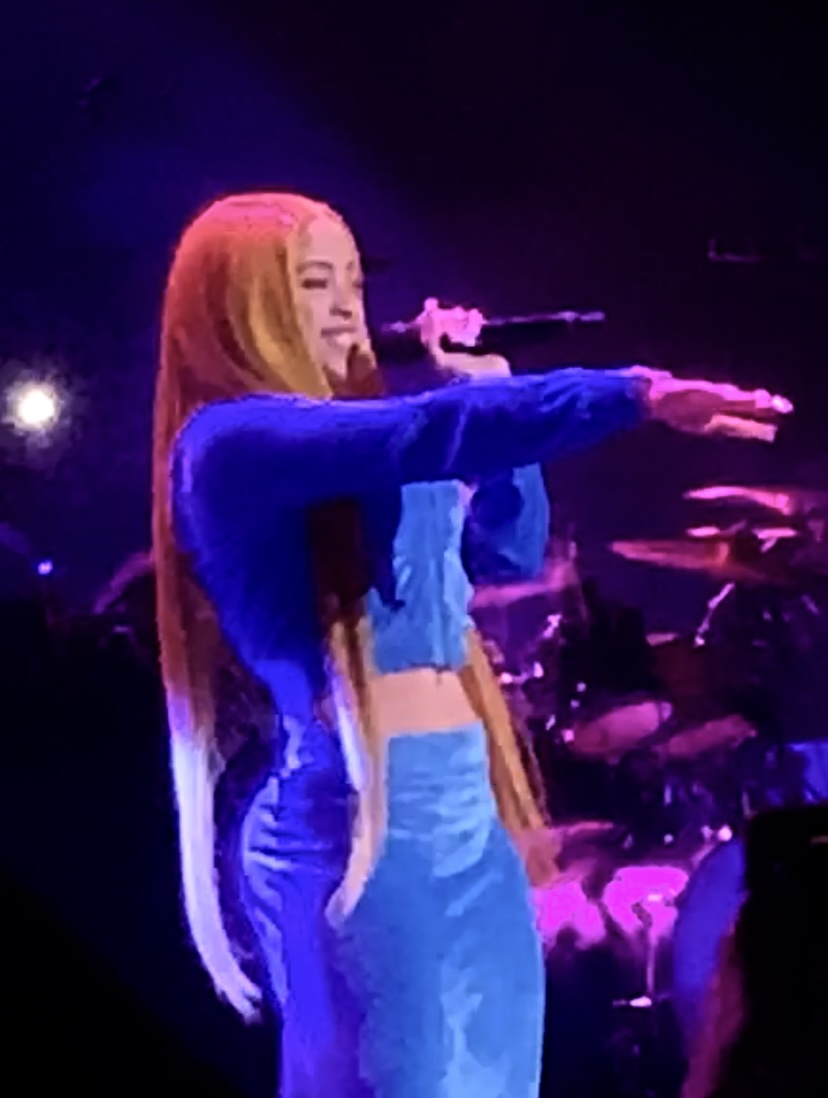
Ice Spice performing at a PinkPantheress concert in Brooklyn in 2024

Ice Spice's debut EP, Like..?, was released on January 20, 2023, and included the singles "Munch (Feelin' U)", "Bikini Bottom", and "In Ha Mood". In February 2023, Ice Spice collaborated with Lil Tjay on the tribute single "Gangsta Boo" to the late rapper of the same name, which became her first song on the Billboard Hot 100 at No. 82. On February 3, 2023, the remix of singer PinkPantheress's song, "Boy's a Liar Pt. 2" featuring Ice Spice and the corresponding music video were released. The song peaked at No. 3 on the Billboard Hot 100, the highest charting position for either artist at the time. In April 2023, she released the remix of "Princess Diana" with Nicki Minaj. The song peaked at number four on the Hot 100, earning Ice Spice her second top-ten hit on the chart and the twenty second top-ten hit for Minaj.

On May 24, 2023, a remix of Taylor Swift's "Karma" featuring Ice Spice, was announced for release on May 26, 2023. The remix is a bonus track on the special editions of Swift's tenth studio album, Midnights (2022). A music video for the remix, featuring Swift and Ice Spice, was released on May 27. Pitchfork described 2023 as the breakout year of Ice Spice. "Karma" peaked at number two on the Hot 100, making Ice Spice the artist with the most Hot 100 top-five singles in 2023. On June 26, she released "Barbie World" with Nicki Minaj which debuted at number 7 on the Hot 100. The deluxe version of Like..?, featuring five new tracks, was released on July 21, 2023.

On November 14, 2023, she teased an upcoming project titled Y2K! slated for 2024. She released the single "Think U the Shit (Fart)" as its lead single in January 2024. Y2K!, was released on July 26, 2024, and sold 28,000 copies for its first week. The project received mixed reviews from fans and critics, with Variety noting Ice Spice's contribution to the drill subgenre, stating that Y2K! "struck the right equilibrium between street and pop sensibility — just hard enough for rap purists, softened around the edges for broader appeal — and set the table for what was leaning toward a mainstream breakthrough with her debut album." NPR described the album as "almost crudely basic" and that Ice Spice "presses into syllables and pulls them apart like Play-Doh...she can make rapping itself feel like an afterthought, so trivial to her day-to-day routine that putting in the minimum effort makes a weirdly intuitive sense." On August 1, 2024, Ice Spice added a bonus track to the album titled "Gyat". On December 25, 2024, a deluxe version of Y2K! was released, with features from BB Trickz, DaBaby, NLE Choppa and Anuel AA.

On November 1, 2024, Ice Spice, along with Snoop Dogg, performed in Times Square to promote the "Chapter 2 Remix" season in Fortnite, with outfits and stylized cosmetics based on Ice Spice being available for purchase in the game. On New Year's Eve of 2024, Ice Spice arrived 25 minutes late to her Wildlands Festival set in Brisbane. Despite being the headline act, her microphone was cut off five minutes into the performance.

In September 2024, New York rapper Cleotrapa, who opened for Ice Spice on the U.S. leg of the Y2K! Tour, posted a six-part video to TikTok criticizing Ice Spice's treatment of her on tour, calling her a "fake friend" and alleging she was unpaid for her performances, forced to handle her own luggage, and left to arrange her own accommodations. The controversy garnered significant public attention, with artists Baby Storme and Azealia Banks voicing their support for Cleotrapa.

In 2025, Thee Bella Brand LLC, a wigmaker brand, sued Ice Spice over her alleged failure to pay $20,000 for 25 wigs. The company also alleged that Ice Spice discussed the brand negatively online, resulting in $400,000 in lost sales opportunities. The rapper was scheduled to testify in September 2026.

== Artistry ==
=== Musical and lyrical style ===
Ice Spice's music is primarily Bronx drill. Her name came from a "finsta" (fake Instagram account) she made at age 14. She has said she writes all her own lyrics, though she does not consider herself a lyricist. She explained that she prefers her lyrics to be "super simple" and "digestible".

=== Influences ===
In a 2022 feature for Rolling Stone titled "My Life in 10 Songs", Ice Spice included Coldplay's song "Yellow" and the 1975's song "Sex" on her list. She stated, "When I was 13 or 14, I was playing The 1975 all the time. It was my shit, I think it's because they're from Europe and he Matty Healy has that British accent. It was a thing for me."

Ice Spice was first inspired to start rapping by Sheff G and Pop Smoke, and has listed Lil' Kim, Nicki Minaj, Cardi B, Foxy Brown, and Remy Ma as musical influences due to their New York roots. She has also called Erykah Badu, Rihanna, Taylor Swift, and Lauryn Hill inspirations because of their "graceful angelic vibe of timeless beauty".

== Personal life ==
Ice Spice is bisexual. In 2025, she confirmed via her personal Instagram account that she previously dated professional cornerback Sauce Gardner.

Security footage of the McDonald's incident in April 2026

In April 2026, she was involved in a physical confrontation at a McDonald's restaurant, after she rejected a female fan's advances for a conversation. TMZ obtained the video of the security footage and posted it online.

== Discography ==
- Y2K! (2024)

== Filmography ==
Film
Year	Title	Role	Notes
2025	Highest 2 Lowest	Marisol Cepeda	Film and acting debut
2025	The SpongeBob Movie: Search for SquarePants	Ticket Taker (voice)	Voice acting debut

== Tours ==
=== Headlining ===
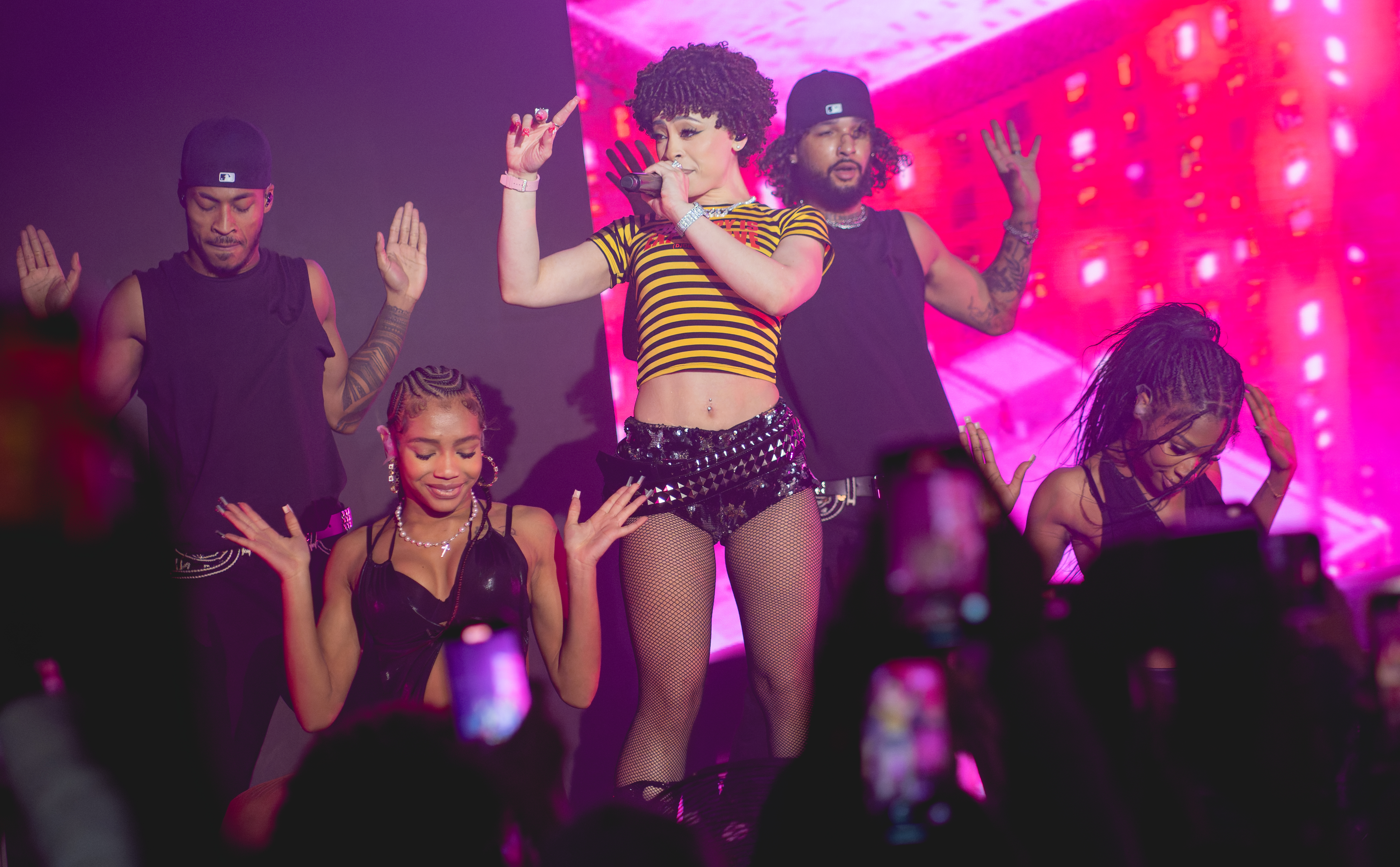
Ice Spice performing at Outernet London on the Y2K! World Tour, 2024

- Y2K! World Tour (2024–2025)

=== Supporting ===
- Doja Cat – The Scarlet Tour (2023)

== Awards and nominations ==
Award	Year	Category	Nominee(s)	Result	Ref.
All-Rap Caviar	2023	Rookie of The Year	Herself	Nominated	
All-Rap Caviar	2023	Second Team	Herself	Honoured	
BET Awards	2023	Best Female Hip Hop Artist	Herself	Nominated	
BET Awards	2023	Best New Artist	Herself	Nominated	
BET Awards	2023	Best Collaboration	"Boy's a Liar Pt. 2" (with PinkPantheress)	Nominated	
BET Awards	2023	BET Her	"Boy's a Liar Pt. 2" (with PinkPantheress)	Nominated	
BET Awards	2024	Best Collaboration	"Barbie World" (with Nicki Minaj)	Nominated	
BET Awards	2024	Video of the Year	"Barbie World" (with Nicki Minaj)	Nominated	
BET Awards	2024	Best Female Hip-Hop Artist	Herself	Nominated	
BET Hip-Hop Awards	2023	Best Collaboration	"Princess Diana" (with Nicki Minaj)	Nominated	
BET Hip-Hop Awards	2023	Best Breakthrough Hip-Hop Artist	Herself	Won	
Billboard Music Awards	2023	Top New Artist	Herself	Nominated	
Billboard Music Awards	2023	Top Rap Female Artist	Herself	Nominated	
Billboard's R&B/Hip-Hop Power Players	2023	Rookie of The Year	Herself	Won	
Billboard Women in Music	2024	Hitmaker Award	Herself	Won	
BMI R&B/Hip-Hop Awards	2023	Impact Award	Herself	Won	
Grammy Awards	2024	Best New Artist	Herself	Nominated	
Grammy Awards	2024	Best Pop Duo/Group Performance	"Karma" (with Taylor Swift)	Nominated	
Grammy Awards	2024	Best Rap Song	"Barbie World" (with Nicki Minaj and Aqua)	Nominated	
Grammy Awards	2024	Best Song Written for Visual Media	"Barbie World" (with Nicki Minaj and Aqua)	Nominated	
iHeartRadio Music Awards	2024	Best Collaboration	"Barbie World" (with Nicki Minaj and Aqua)	Nominated	
iHeartRadio Music Awards	2024	Best Collaboration	"Boy's a Liar Pt. 2" (with PinkPantheress)	Nominated	
iHeartRadio Music Awards	2024	TikTok Bop of the Year	"Boy's a Liar Pt. 2" (with PinkPantheress)	Nominated	
iHeartRadio Music Awards	2024	Best New Hip-Hop Artist	Herself	Won	
Ivor Novello Awards	2024	PRS for Music Most Performed Work	"Boy's a Liar Pt. 2" (with PinkPantheress)	Nominated	
Kid's Choice Awards	2024	Favourite Music Collaboration	"Barbie World" (with Nicki Minaj and Aqua)	Won	
Kid's Choice Awards	2024	Favourite Music Collaboration	"Karma" (with Taylor Swift)	Nominated	
Kid's Choice Awards	2024	Favourite Breakout Artist	Herself	Nominated	
MOBO Awards	2023	Best International Act	Herself	Nominated	
MOBO Awards	2023	Song of the Year	"Boy's a Liar Pt.2" (with PinkPantheress)	Nominated	
MTV Europe Music Awards	2023	Best Collaboration	"Boy's a Liar Pt.2" (with PinkPantheress)	Nominated	
MTV Europe Music Awards	2023	Best New	Herself	Nominated	
MTV Europe Music Awards	2023	Best Push	Herself	Nominated	
MTV Video Music Awards	2023	Best New Artist	Herself	Won	
MTV Video Music Awards	2023	Best Push Performance	"Princess Diana"	Nominated	
MTV Video Music Awards	2023	Song of Summer	"Barbie World" (with Nicki Minaj and Aqua)	Nominated	
MTV Video Music Awards	2023	Song of Summer	"Karma" (with Taylor Swift)	Nominated	
People's Choice Awards	2023	The New Artist of the Year	Herself	Won	
People's Choice Awards	2023	The Collaboration Song of the Year	"Barbie World" (with Nicki Minaj and Aqua)	Won	
The Queerties	2024	Breakout Musical Artist	Herself	Runner-up	
The Queerties	2024	Anthem	"Boy's a Liar Pt. 2" (with PinkPantheress)	Nominated	
Soul Train Music Awards	2023	Best Collaboration	"Boy's a Liar Pt. 2" (with PinkPantheress)	Nominated	
Soul Train Music Awards	2023	Video of the Year	"Boy's a Liar Pt. 2" (with PinkPantheress)	Nominated	
Streamy Awards	2023	Sound of the Year	"Boy's a Liar Pt. 2" (with PinkPantheress)	Nominated	
Streamy Awards	2023	Sound of the Year	"In Ha Mood"	Nominated	
XXL Awards	2023	Best New Artist of the Year	Herself	Nominated	
XXL Awards	2024	Song of the Year	"Barbie World" (with Nicki Minaj and Aqua)	Nominated	
XXL Awards	2024	Video of the Year	"Barbie World" (with Nicki Minaj and Aqua)	Nominated	
XXL Awards	2024	Female Rapper of the Year	Herself	Nominated	
XXL Awards	2024	The People's Champ	Herself	Nominated	
