= Y2K! World Tour =

2024–2025 concert tour by Ice Spice

- World Tour concert by Ice Spice
- Promotional poster for North American leg
- Location: Oceania; Europe; North America
- Associated album: Y2K!
- Start date: July 4, 2024
- End date: January 5, 2025
- Legs: 4
- No. of shows: 40
- Supporting acts: Cash Cobain; Cleotrapa; Bktherula
- Box office: $7.5 Million

Ice Spice concert chronology
- Y2K! World Tour (2024–2025); ...

The Y2K! World Tour was the debut concert tour by American rapper Ice Spice in support of her debut album, Y2K! (2024). It began on July 4, 2024, in Roskilde, and concluded in Adelaide on January 5, 2025, comprising forty shows. Cash Cobain and Cleotrapa served as opening acts for the North American leg, while Bktherula supported the European leg.

== Background ==
On June 5, 2024, Ice Spice formally announced the tour, with 24 shows across Europe and North America from July through August 2024. Tickets went on sale on June 7, with a presale that ran from June 5 until June 6. On June 6, 2024, Ice Spice added a second New York date due to demand.

== Set list ==
The following set list is obtained from the July 30, 2024 show in Washington D.C. It is not intended to represent all dates throughout the tour.

1. "Popa"
2. "Munch (Feelin' U)"
3. "Princess Diana"
4. "Phat Butt"
5. "Barbie World"
6. "Gimme a Light"
7. "Plenty Sun"
8. "Bikini Bottom"
9. "Butterfly Ku"
10. "Gangsta Boo"
11. "Actin a Smoochie"
12. "Boy's a Liar Pt.2"
13. "Bitch, I’m Packin'"
14. "Deli"
15. "BB Belt"
16. "In Ha Mood"
17. "TTYL"
18. "Oh Shhh..."
19. "Did It First"
20. "Fisherrr"
21. "Think U the Shit (Fart)"

=== Notes ===
- During the July 12 show in London, Central Cee joined Spice on-stage to perform "Did It First" and "Band4Band".

== Tour dates ==
List of 2024 concerts, showing date, city, country, venue, opening acts, attendance and gross revenue
Date (2024)	City	Country	Venue	Opening act	Attendance	Revenue
July 4 (Note: The show on July 4, 2024 was a part of the Roskilde Festival.)	Roskilde	Denmark	Dyrskuepladsen	—N/a	—N/a	—N/a
July 5 (Note: The show on July 5, 2024, was a part of Open'er Festival.)	Gdynia	Poland	Gdynia-Kosakowo Airport	—N/a	—N/a	—N/a
July 7 (Note: The show on July 7, 2024, was a part of Rolling Loud Europe.)	Ebreichsdorf	Austria	Magna Racino	—N/a	—N/a	—N/a
July 12 (Note: The show on July 12, 2024, was a part of Wireless Festival.)	London	England	Finsbury Park	—N/a	—N/a	—N/a
July 13 (Note: The show on July 13, 2024, was a part of Openair Frauenfeld.)	Frauenfeld	Switzerland	Grosse Allmend	—N/a	—N/a	—N/a
July 14 (Note: The show on July 14, 2024, was a part of Beach, Please! Festival, which was rescheduled from July 11.)	Costinești	Romania	Costineşti Beach	—N/a	—N/a	—N/a
July 18 (Note: The show on July 18, 2024, was a part of Dour Festival.)	Dour	Belgium	Plaine de la Machine à Feu	—N/a	—N/a	—N/a
July 30	Washington, D.C.	United States	The Anthem	Cash Cobain; Cleotrapa	3,303 / 5,000	$217,294
August 1	Montclair	United States	Wellmont Theater	Cash Cobain; Cleotrapa	—N/a	—N/a
August 2	Philadelphia	United States	The Met Philadelphia	Cash Cobain; Cleotrapa	—N/a	—N/a
August 4	Boston	United States	MGM Music Hall at Fenway	Cash Cobain; Cleotrapa	4,587 / 4,943	$281,185
August 7 (Note: Both New York shows were relocated from The Rooftop at Pier 17 to Terminal 5 due to a severe thunderstorm.)	New York City	United States	Terminal 5	Cash Cobain; Cleotrapa	—N/a	—N/a
August 8 (Note: The show on August 8, 2024, was rescheduled from August 6 due to a severe thunderstorm.)	New York City	United States	Terminal 5	Cash Cobain; Cleotrapa	—N/a	—N/a
August 9	Detroit	United States	The Fillmore Detroit	Cash Cobain; Cleotrapa	—N/a	—N/a
August 11	Toronto	Canada	History	Cash Cobain; Cleotrapa	—N/a	—N/a
August 13	Chicago	United States	Byline Bank Aragon Ballroom	Cash Cobain; Cleotrapa	—N/a	—N/a
August 14	Minneapolis	United States	Minneapolis Armory	Cash Cobain; Cleotrapa	—N/a	—N/a
August 17	Denver	United States	Fillmore Auditorium	Cash Cobain; Cleotrapa	—N/a	—N/a
August 19	Los Angeles	United States	Hollywood Palladium	Cash Cobain; Cleotrapa	—N/a	—N/a
August 21	Oakland	United States	Fox Oakland Theatre	Cash Cobain; Cleotrapa	2,256 / 2,800	$140,869
August 23	Tempe	United States	Marquee Theatre	Cash Cobain; Cleotrapa	—N/a	—N/a
August 25	Dallas	United States	The Factory in Deep Ellum	Cash Cobain; Cleotrapa	—N/a	—N/a
August 26	Houston	United States	Bayou Music Center	Cash Cobain; Cleotrapa	—N/a	—N/a
August 28	Atlanta	United States	Coca-Cola Roxy	Cash Cobain; Cleotrapa	—N/a	—N/a
August 31	Miami Beach	United States	The Fillmore Miami Beach	Cash Cobain; Cleotrapa	—N/a	—N/a
October 29	Dublin	Ireland	3Olympia Theatre	Bktherula	—N/a	—N/a
October 30	Manchester	England	O2 Victoria Warehouse	Bktherula	—N/a	—N/a
October 31	Glasgow	Scotland	Barrowland Ballroom	Bktherula	—N/a	—N/a
November 4	London	England	Outernet London	Bktherula	—N/a	—N/a
November 5	Birmingham	England	O_{2} Institute	Bktherula	—N/a	—N/a
November 7	Brussels	Belgium	La Madeleine	Bktherula	—N/a	—N/a
November 8	Tilburg	Netherlands	013	Bktherula	—N/a	—N/a
November 10	Paris	France	L'Olympia	Bktherula	—N/a	—N/a
November 13	Berlin	Germany	Astra Kulturhaus	Bktherula	—N/a	—N/a
November 15	Hamburg	Germany	Große Freiheit 36	Bktherula	—N/a	—N/a
December 29 (Note: The show on December 29, 2024, is a part of Rhythm & Vines.)	Gisborne	New Zealand	Waiohika Estate Vineyard	—N/a	—N/a	—N/a
December 30 (Note: The show on December 30, 2024, is a part of Beyond the Valley.)	Hesse	Australia	Barunah Plains Homestead	—N/a	—N/a	—N/a
December 31 (Note: The show on December 31, 2024, is a part of Wildlands Festival.)	Brisbane	Australia	Brisbane Showgrounds	—N/a	—N/a	—N/a

List of 2025 concerts, showing date, city, country, venue, opening acts, attendance and gross revenue
Date (2025)	City	Country	Venue	Opening act	Attendance	Revenue
January 4 (Note: The show on January 4, 2025, is part of the Wildlands Festival.)	Perth	Australia	Arena Joondalup	—N/a	—N/a	—N/a
January 5 (Note: The show on January 5, 2025, is a part of Wildlands Festival.)	Adelaide	Australia	Ellis Park	—N/a	—N/a	—N/a
Total					10,146 / 12,743 (79.62%)	$639,348

=== Cancelled concerts ===
List of cancelled concerts showing date, city, country, venue and reason
Date	City	Country	Venue	Reason
November 17, 2024	Copenhagen	Denmark	Poolen	Unknown
November 18, 2024	Stockholm	Sweden	B-K	Unknown
November 20, 2024	Oslo	Norway	Sentrum Scene	Unknown
