= Play Cash Cobain =

Studio album by Cash Cobain
- Released: August 23, 2024
- Genre: Hip-hop, R&B
- Length: 54:39
- Label: Giant Music
- Producer: Alex Oso; Cash Cobain; Fckbwoy; Gvrland!; Iodoni; Kez Diddier; Sliick; Tommy Parker; Whereis22; WhoJiggi

Cash Cobain chronology
Pretty Girls Love Slizzy (2023)	Play Cash Cobain (2024)

Singles from Play Cash Cobain
- 1. "Dunk Contest" Released: January 29, 2024; 2. "Fisherrr" Released: February 28, 2024; 3. "Rump Punch" Released: June 7, 2024; 4. "Problem" Released: August 14, 2024

Play Cash Cobain is the debut studio album by American rapper and record producer Cash Cobain, released on August 23, 2024, by Giant Music. It features guest appearances by Bay Swag, Big Sean, 6lack, Anycia, Chow Lee, Don Q, Don Toliver, Fabolous, Flee, Flo Milli, Kaliii, Kenzo B, Laila!, Lay Bankz, Luh Tyler, Payroll, Quavo, Rob49, Vontee the Singer, and YN Jay.

== Background and release ==
On January 29, 2024, Cash Cobain released "Dunk Contest", the album's first single. On February 28, 2024, the album's second single, "Fisherrr" was released. A remix to "Fisherrr" featuring Ice Spice was released on April 26, 2024. A remix to "Dunk Contest" featuring J. Cole, titled "Grippy", was released on May 24, 2024. He released the album's third single, "Rump Punch" on June 7, 2024. Cash Cobain was featured on the XXL Freshman List in June 2024. On August 14, 2024, he announced the album's cover art and release date, alongside the fourth single, "Problem", featuring Laila!, Fabolous, Big Sean, Kenzo B, Lay Bankz, Luh Tyler, Anycia, Chow Lee, Kaliii, 6lack, Flo Milli, YN Jay, Flee, Don Q and Rob49. He also released a website allowing users to add and arrange vocal features on the song, with additional features from Lil Yachty and Kyle Richh. The album cover was designed by Drake.

== Critical reception ==
Professional ratings
Aggregate scores
Source	Rating
Metacritic	81/100
Review scores
Source	Rating
RapReviews	6/10
Rolling Stone	4/5 stars
Pitchfork	7.7/10

Play Cash Cobain was met with critical acclaim. At Metacritic, which assigns a normalized rating out of 100 to reviews from mainstream critics, the album received an average score of 81, which indicates "universal acclaim", based on four reviews.

Jeff Ihaza of Rolling Stone described the album as "a blueprint for a new kind of rap-r&b crossover." Writing for Variety, Peter A. Berry wrote that the album was "versatile, laugh-out-loud funny and, at times, pretty nuanced" and that it "renders childish humor and romance in a seamless dance" with "a general sense of horny whimsy seeping in everywhere from the song titles to the bar structures." Alphonse Pierre's review for Pitchfork wrote that Cash Cobain's "self-produced beats do more talking than his words, filling in emotional blanks with a 4o-esque fogginess and R&B samples that add some longing to his nonstop raunchiness."

=== Accolades ===
Publication	Accolade	Rank	Ref.
Billboard	The 20 Best Rap Albums of 2024	14	
Rolling Stone	The 100 Best Albums of 2024	50	
Rolling Stone	The 20 Best Hip-Hop Albums of 2024	18	
Okayplayer	The 50 Best Albums of 2024	—N/a	
Stereogum	The 10 Best Rap Albums Of 2024	8	
Uproxx	The Best Albums Of 2024	—N/a	

== Track listing ==
All tracks produced by Cash Cobain, except where noted.

Play Cash Cobain track listing
No.	Title	Writer(s)	Producer(s)	Length
1.	"SlizzyHunchoDon"	Cashmere Small; Caleb Toliver; Lorenzo Spadoni; Quavious Marshall	Cash Cobain; Iodoni	3:25
2.	"Rump Punch"	Small		2:03
3.	"All I Wanna Hear"	Small; Craig Parks; Ken Ford; O'Neil Bryan		1:51
4.	"Dunk Contest"	Small; Garland Jean	Cash Cobain; GvrInd!	3:17
5.	"CantSleep/DrunkInLuv"	Small; Bishop Paul Burrell; Dewayne Conner; Omingo Conner; Roger Troutman		3:16
6.	"Problem" (with Laila!)	SmallAfolabi Rosiji; Anycia Edwards; Jaylein Cantrell; John Jackson; Justin Jones; Kaliya Ross; Laila Smith; Layia Watkins; Le'Quincy Anderson; Ricardo Valentine; Robert Thomas; Sean Anderson; Tamia Carter; Te'arah Gaines; Tyler Meeks		7:39
7.	"Slizzy Poetry" (interlude)	Small; Avante Smith		1:38
8.	"Turks (I Apologize)"	Small		1:31
9.	"Wassup WYA"	Small; Christain Diddier Marquez	Cash Cobain; Kez Diddier	1:58
10.	"Message to U"	Small		2:01
11.	"Dunk"	Small		2:38
12.	"Luv It"	Small		3:56
13.	"Me n Payroll" (with Payroll)	Small; Alex Oso; Corey Fraser; Tommy Parker	Cash Cobain; Oso; Parker	3:04
14.	"Slizzy Poetry Pt. 2" (interlude)	Small; Lance Williams	Cash Cobain; Sliick	2:06
15.	"Fisherrr" (with Bay Swag)	Small; Joshua Jubilee; Kion Monsanto	Cash Cobain; Fckbwoy!; WhoJiggi	3:56
16.	"Act Like"	Small; Alex Petit Sr.; Bashar Jackson; Cedric Leutwyler; Christoffer Marcussen; Damon Thomas; Dominique Jones; Eric Dion Hawkins; Harvey Mason Jr.; Jess Jackson; Jonathan Kirk; Michael Dean; Tyrese Gibson		2:21
17.	"Candle"	Small; Neko Bennett		3:29
18.	"Some Shit"	Small; Michael Rainey Jr.	Cash Cobain; Whereis22	2:12
19.	"Baddest in the Room"	Small		2:18
Total length:				54:39

Notes

- All tracks are stylized in lowercase.

Sample credits

- "All I Wanna Hear" contains a sample of "Pon de River, Pon de Bank", as performed by Elephant Man.
- "Dunk Contest" contains a sample of "Gotta Get You Home Tonight", as performed by Eugene Wilde.
- "CantSleep/DrunkInLuv" contains a sample of "Knockin' Da Boots", written by Keven Conner, Solomon Conner, and Darryl Jackson, as performed by H-Town.
- "Problem" contains a sample of "Not My Problem", written and performed by Laila!.
- "Slizzy Poetry" contains a sample of "Ooo La La La", written by Teena Marie and Allen McGrier, as performed by Teena Marie.
- "Dunk" contains a sample of "Donk", written by DeAndre Way, as performed by Soulja Boy.
- "Act Like" contains samples of "How You Gonna Act Like That", written by Tyrese Gibson, Harvey Mason Jr., Damon Thomas, and Eric Dawkins, as performed by Tyrese; and "For the Night", written by Bashar Jackson, Dominique Jones, Jonathan Kirk, Alex Petit, Christoffer Marcussen, Michael Dean, and Cedric Leutwyler, as performed by Pop Smoke featuring Lil Baby and DaBaby.

== Charts ==
Weekly chart performance for Play Cash Cobain
Chart (2024)	Peak position
US Billboard 200	113
