= Cash Cobain =

American rapper (born 1998)

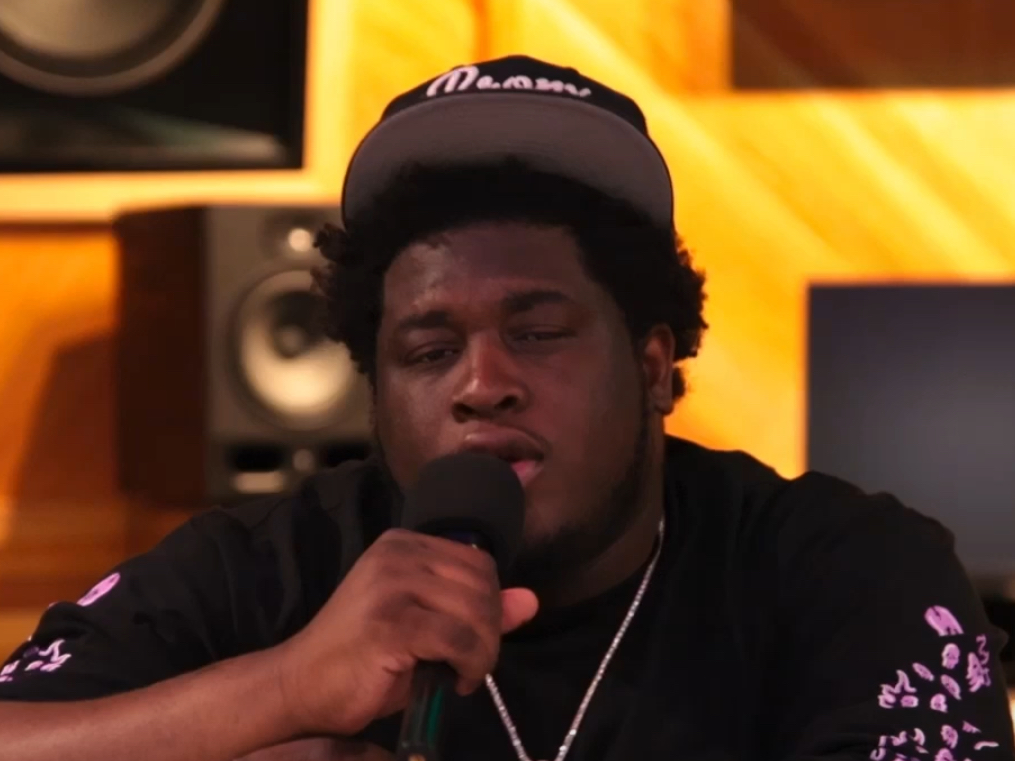
- Cash Cobain in 2024

Background information
- Born: Cashmere Lavon Small; March 31, 1998 (age 28); New York City, U.S.
- Genres: East Coast hip-hop; trap; drill
- Occupations: Rapper; songwriter; record producer
- Years active: 2018–present
- Label: Giant

Cashmere Lavon Small (born March 31, 1998), known professionally as Cash Cobain, is an American rapper and record producer. As a producer and vocalist, he has collaborated with artists including Trippie Redd, Ice Spice, Nav, Justin Bieber, A Boogie wit da Hoodie, Don Toliver, Charlie Wilson, J. Cole, Cardi B, PartyNextDoor, Drake, Rob49, and Loe Shimmy.

== Early life ==
Cashmere Lavon Small was born in the Bronx, New York City, on March 31, 1998. He first started making beats at a young age in his grandmother's house in New York City in the Forest Houses. He grew up in the South Bronx and moved to Queens as a teenager. Being inspired by drill, trap, and Jersey club music, he taught himself how to produce music using VirtualDJ and FL Studio.

== Career ==
Small released his debut mixtape 719 in 2018. He released 2 Slizzy 2 Sexy, a collaborative mixtape with Chow Lee, in 2022. On August 23, 2024, Small released his debut studio album, Play Cash Cobain, to positive critical reception.

== Artistry ==
Small has been called a pioneer of "sexy drill", a subgenre of drill music focused on sex, and "sample drill", a subgenre of drill music focused on R&B samples and melodic rapping. His music often features samples from a wide range of sources. He is widely known for his producer tag, "And this beat from Cash, not from YouTube", voiced by rapper Big Yaya.

== Personal life ==
Small supported Jamaal Bowman in the 2024 District 16 United States House of Representatives election.

== Discography ==
=== Studio albums ===
Title	Album details	Peak chart positions
Title	Album details	US
Play Cash Cobain	Released: August 23, 2024; Label: Giant Music; Format: Digital download, streaming	113

=== Mixtapes ===
Title	Mixtape details
719	Released: July 17, 2018; Label: Neva Slippin; Format: Digital download, streaming
Nirvana	Released: August 6, 2021; Label: Neva Slippin, CashCobain Inc.; Format: Digital download, streaming
Slizzy Timing	Released: January 1, 2022; Label: Neva Slippin, CashCobain Inc., MHPG Sound; Format: Digital download, streaming
2 Slizzy 2 Sexy (with Chow Lee)	Released: September 8, 2022; Label: Neva Slippin, CashCobain Inc., Dollhouse Records; Format: Digital download, streaming
Pretty Girls Love Slizzy	Released: September 13, 2023; Label: Giant Music; Format: Digital download, streaming

=== Singles ===
==== As lead artist ====
Title	Year	Peak chart positions			Album
Title	Year	US Bub.	US R&B/HH	NZ Hot	Album
"Dunk Contest"	2024	—	—	—	Play Cash Cobain
"Fisherrr" (with Bay Swag)	2024	11	33	—	Play Cash Cobain
"Grippy" (with J. Cole)	2024	—	—	16	Non-album singles
"Rump Punch"	2024	—	—	—	Play Cash Cobain
"Problem" (with Laila!, Fabolous, Big Sean, Kenzo B, Lay Bankz, Luh Tyler, Anycia, Chow Lee, Kaliii, 6lack, Flo Milli, YN Jay, FLEE, Don Q, and Rob49)	2024	—	—	—	Play Cash Cobain
"—" denotes a recording that did not chart or was not released in that territory.

==== As featured artist ====
Title	Year	Peak chart positions						Album
Title	Year	US	US R&B/HH	US Rap	CAN	NZ Hot	WW	Album
"Citi" (SpliffHappy featuring Cash Cobain)	2024	—	—	—	—	—	—	Non-album singles
"Marni" (Slizzy Ent featuring Cash Cobain, Marni, Vontee the Singer, and Matthew Ali)	2024	—	—	—	—	—	—	Non-album singles
"Favorite Lady" (Diany Dior and Nav featuring Cash Cobain)	2024	—	—	—	—	—	—	Big Dior
"Body" (A Boogie wit da Hoodie featuring Cash Cobain)	2024	—	46	—	—	—	—	Better Off Alone
"Attitude" (Don Toliver featuring Charlie Wilson and Cash Cobain)	2024	58	16	14	82	20	163	Hardstone Psycho
"Daylight" (Lancey Foux featuring Teezo Touchdown and Cash Cobain)	2024	—	—	—	—	—	—	Non-album singles
"6AM Thoughts" (Nav and Bay Swag featuring Cash Cobain)	2024	—	—	—	—	—	—	Non-album singles
"Somebody Loves Me Pt. 2" (PartyNextDoor and Drake featuring Cash Cobain)	2025	27	3	—	27	11	43	Non-album singles
"—" denotes a recording that did not chart or was not released in that territory.

=== Other charted songs ===
Title	Year	Peak chart positions			Album
Title	Year	US	US R&B/HH	US Rap	Album
"Better than You" (Cardi B featuring Cash Cobain)	2025	85	25	20	Am I the Drama?

=== Guest appearances ===
List of guest appearances, with other performing artists, showing year released and album name
Title	Year	Other artist(s)	Album
"Twi$ted, Pt. 2"	2024	Vontee the Singer	Lovers & Friends (Deluxe)
"Swag"	2025	Justin Bieber, Eddie Benjamin	Swag
"Somebody Loves Me Pt. 2"	2025	PartyNextDoor, Drake	Non-album single
"Trick"	2026	Nemzzz	Locked In

== Tours ==
Headlining

- Party with Slizzy

Supporting

- Ice Spice – Y2K! World Tour (2024)
