= Billboard 21 Under 21 =

Annual ranking of musicians

21 Under 21 is an annual ranking by American music magazine Billboard that began in 2010. It honors young musicians under the age of 21 in the music industry for impact over the previous year and their potential to "rule pop culture zeitgeist over the next 12 months".

Taylor Swift topped the first ranking in 2010 at age 20. Justin Bieber (2011), Lorde (2014), Billie Eilish (2019) and Yoonchae from Katseye (2025) are the youngest artists to be at number one (all aged 17). Willow Smith is the youngest artist to appear on any ranking (aged 9 in 2010). Smith also has the longest period of inclusion, appearing on five rankings across eleven years (2010, 2011, 2018, 2019 and 2021). The Linda Lindas have the most appearances on the list with six consecutive placements (2021–2026). Bieber, Camila Cabello, Eilish, Shawn Mendes, Lorde, Cody Simpson, Smith, Grace VanderWaal and The Kid Laroi are tied with five each with the second most appearances. Bieber, Mendes, Ángela Aguilar and Katseye are the only artists to top the ranking both twice and consecutively.

== Poll results by year ==
| Place | 2010 | 2011 | 2012 | 2013 | 2014 |
|---|---|---|---|---|---|
| 1 | Taylor Swift | Justin Bieber | | One Direction | Lorde |
| 2 | Justin Bieber | Tyler, the Creator | One Direction | Justin Bieber | 5 Seconds of Summer |
| 3 | Selena Gomez | | Demi Lovato | Miley Cyrus | Justin Bieber |
| 4 | Jake Zyrus (Note: Known as Charice until his gender transition in 2017.) | Scotty McCreery | | Ariana Grande | Martin Garrix |
| 5 | Soulja Boy | Jackie Evancho | Mac Miller | Earl Sweatshirt | Fifth Harmony |
| 6 | Nick Jonas | Mac Miller | Selena Gomez | Lorde | Austin Mahone |
| 7 | Willow Smith | Demi Lovato | Porter Robinson | Austin Mahone | Earl Sweatshirt |
| 8 | Demi Lovato | Nick Jonas | Cher Lloyd | Scotty McCreery | Shawn Mendes |
| 9 | Greyson Chance | Rye Rye | Earl Sweatshirt | Cody Simpson | Becky G |
| 10 | Miley Cyrus | Victoria Justice | Nick Jonas | Emblem3 | Chief Keef |
| 11 | Lex Lugler | | Jackie Evancho | Cher Lloyd | Luis Coronel |
| 12 | Taylor Momsen | Il Volo | Cody Simpson | Chief Keef | Meghan Trainor |
| 13 | Chris Colfer | Cody Simpson | Mindless Behaviour | Bridgit Mendler | Cody Simpson |
| 14 | Miranda Cosgrove | Willow Smith | Megan and Liz | Miguelito | Madeon |
| 15 | Diggy Simmons | Greyson Chance | IU | Joey Badass | Bobby Shmurda |
| 16 | Wonder Girls | Mindless Behaviour | Bridgit Mendler | Tori Kelly | Scotty McCreery |
| 17 | Never Shout Never | HyunA | 3Ball MTY | Martin Garrix | Troye Sivan |
| 18 | New Boyz | Porter Robinson | Miley Cyrus | Mindless Behaviour | Rae Sremmurd |
| 19 | Nikki Yanofsky | One Direction | Madeon | Matty B | Akdong Musician |
| 20 | Cody Simpson | Miguelito | Ross Lynch | Lee Hi | The Vamps |
| 21 | Sean Kingston | Miley Cyrus | Victoria Justice | Fifth Harmony | Unlocking the Truth |

| Place | 2015 | 2016 | 2017 | 2018 | 2019 |
|---|---|---|---|---|---|
| 1 | 5 Seconds of Summer | Fifth Harmony | Shawn Mendes | | Billie Eilish |
| 2 | Fifth Harmony | Shawn Mendes | Lorde | Khalid | Lil Nas X |
| 3 | Lorde | Desiigner | Khalid | Lil Pump | Juice Wrld |
| 4 | Shawn Mendes | Martin Garrix | Lil Yachty | Billie Eilish | Lil Pump |
| 5 | Rae Sremmurd | Daya | Camila Cabello | Juice Wrld | Chloe x Halle |
| 6 | Troye Sivan | Alessia Cara | Kodak Black | Bhad Bhabie | Lil Tecca |
| 7 | Martin Garrix | 5 Seconds of Summer | Hailee Steinfeld | Daya | Mason Ramsey |
| 8 | Maddie & Tae | Lorde | Grace VanderWaal | Sabrina Carpenter | Bhad Bhabie |
| 9 | Joey Badass | Hailee Steinfeld | CNCO | Jaden Smith | Christian Nodal |
| 10 | Hailee Steinfeld | Zendaya | Desiigner | Why Don't We | Daya |
| 11 | Alessia Cara | Jaden Smith | Noah Cyrus | CNCO | Why Don't We |
| 12 | Becky G | Lil Yachty | Daya | Chief Keef | Noah Cyrus |
| 13 | Zendaya | Sabrina Carpenter | Alan Walker | Grace VanderWaal | NCT Dream |
| 14 | Austin Mahone | Zara Larsson | Becky G | PrettyMuch | Sabrina Carpenter |
| 15 | Jack and Jack | Austin Mahone | Jake Paul | Whethan | King Princess |
| 16 | Luis Coronel | Kodak Black | Why Don't We | Mason Ramsey | PrettyMuch |
| 17 | Silento | Kungs | Zara Larsson | Christian Nodal | Grace VanderWaal |
| 18 | Seventeen | CNCO | Twice | Willow | |
| 19 | Echosmith | Chloe x Halle | PrettyMuch | Madison Beer | Manuel Turizo |
| 20 | Kehlani | Lennon & Maisy | Chloe x Halle | NCT Dream | Snail Mail |
| 21 | Shamir | Grace VanderWaal | Sabrina Carpenter | Snail Mail | Paloma Mami |

| Place | 2020 | 2021 | 2022 | 2023 | 2024 |
|---|---|---|---|---|---|
| 1 | 24kGoldn | The Kid Laroi | Olivia Rodrigo | Ángela Aguilar | |
| 2 | Beabadoobee | Billie Eilish | BoyWithUke | Ayra Starr | Brenn! |
| 3 | Billie Eilish | 24kGoldn | Eslabon Armado | Chloe Moriondo | Chino Pacas |
| 4 | Benee | PinkPantheress | Lil Tecca | D4vd | |
| 5 | Carlie Hanson | Willow | Ángela Aguilar | DannyLux | FloyyMenor |
| 6 | Chloe x Halle | Olivia Rodrigo | The Kid Laroi | Flo | Gayle |
| 7 | Gabby Barrett | NLE Choppa | Callista Clark | Gayle | Iván Cornejo |
| 8 | Jxdn | Lil Huddy | Billie Eilish | Iván Cornejo | Jessie Murph |
| 9 | The Kid Laroi | The Linda Lindas | 347aidan | Kidd G | The Kid Laroi |
| 10 | Koffee | Eslabon Armado | Tiago PZK | The Kid Laroi | Lauren Spencer-Smith |
| 11 | Lil Mosey | Lil Tjay | Lauren Spencer-Smith | | Lay Bankz |
| 12 | Lil Tecca | Griff | NLE Choppa | Lil Tecca | The Linda Lindas |
| 13 | Lil Tjay | Jxdn | Moore Kismet | The Linda Lindas | Luh Tyler |
| 14 | Lunay | Callista Clark | Tate McRae | Luh Tyler | Mason Ramsey |
| 15 | Manuel Turizo | Nessa Barrett | Gayle | Nessa Barrett | New Jeans |
| 16 | Mason Ramsey | Baby Keem | Kidd G | NLE Choppa | Qing Madi |
| 17 | Moore Kismet | Joshua Bassett | DannyLux | Olivia Rodrigo | Roivaz |
| 18 | Natanael Cano | Moore Kismet | The Linda Lindas | Riovaz | Tate McRae |
| 19 | NCT Dream | Grace VanderWaal | Yahritza y Su Esencia | Stephen Sanchez | Xavi |
| 20 | NLE Choppa | Luis Vazquez | Lamorn | Tate McRae | 4batz |
| 21 | Noah Cyrus | Tate McRae | Chloe Moriondo | Yunè Pinku | 310babii |

| Place | 2025 | 2026 | 2027 | 2028 | 2029 |
|---|---|---|---|---|---|
| 1 | Katseye | | | | |
| 2 | Jessie Murph | North West | | | |
| 3 | D4vd | Sienna Spiro | | | |
| 4 | Qing Madi | Freya Skye | | | |
| 5 | Ian | Wyatt Ellis | | | |
| 6 | Iván Cornejo | Milo J | | | |
| 7 | Bayker Blankenship | Ty Myers | | | |
| 8 | Chino Pacas | Bella Kay | | | |
| 9 | Ty Myers | Girlset | | | |
| 10 | Sombr | Laila! | | | |
| 11 | Lil Mosey | FloyyMenor | | | |
| 12 | 310babii | Trim | | | |
| 13 | Waylon Wyatt | Violet Grohl | | | |
| 14 | FloyyMenor | JayDon | | | |
| 15 | Remy Bond | Najeeriii | | | |
| 16 | The Linda Lindas | Maddox Batson | | | |
| 17 | Luh Tyler | Cortis | | | |
| 18 | Laila! | BabyChiefDoIt | | | |
| 19 | NewJeans | Waylon Wyatt | | | |
| 20 | Najeeriii | The Linda Lindas | | | |
| 21 | Maddox Batson | Chino Pacas | | | |

== Musicians with multiple number ones ==
2 placements

- Justin Bieber (consecutive)
- Shawn Mendes (consecutive)
- Ángela Aguilar (consecutive)
- Katseye (consecutive)

== Musicians with multiple appearances ==
6 placements

- The Linda Lindas (2021–2026)

5 placements

- Justin Bieber (2010–2014)
- Billie Eilish (2018–2022)
- Lorde (2013–2017)
- Shawn Mendes (2014–2018)
- Willow (2010–2011, 2018–2019, 2021)
- Grace VanderWaal (2016–2019, 2021)
- Cody Simpson (2010–2014)
- The Kid Laroi (2020–2024)
- Camila Cabello (one solo placement in 2017 and four times with Fifth Harmony)

4 placements

- Chloe x Halle (2016–2017, 2019–2020)
- Fifth Harmony (2013–2016)
- Mindless Behavior (2011–2013, 2017)
- NLE Choppa (2020–2023)
- Sabrina Carpenter (2016–2019)
- Mason Ramsey (2018–2020, 2024)
- Miley Cyrus (2010–2013)
- Austin Mahone (2013–2016)
- Daya (2016–2019)
- Scott McCreery (2011–2014)
- Tate McRae (2021–2024)

3 placements

- CNCO (2016–2018)
- Moore Kismet (2020–2022)
- NCT Dream (2018–2020)
- Olivia Rodrigo (2021–2023)
- One Direction (2011–2013)
- PrettyMuch (2017–2019)
- Gayle (2022–2024)
- Nick Jonas (2010–2012)
- Lauren Spencer-Smith (2022–2024)
- Selena Gomez (2010–2012)
- Noah Cyrus (2017, 2019–2020)
- Why Don't We (2017–2019)
- Demi Lovato (2010–2012)
- Chief Keef (2013–2014, 2018)
- Becky G (2014–2015, 2017)
- 5 Seconds Of Summer (2014–2016)
- Ángela Aguilar (2022–2024)
- D4vd (2023–2025)
- Iván Cornejo (2023–2025)
- Luh Tyler (2023–2025)
- FloyyMenor (2024–2026)
- Chino Pacas (2024–2026)

2 placements

- Qing Madi (2024–2025)
- Chloe Moriondo (2022–2023)
- DannyLux (2022–2023)
- Riovaz (2023–2024)
- Jxdn (2020–2021)
- Kidd G (2022–2023)
- Lex Luger (2010–2011)
- Lil Tecca (2022–2023)
- Manuel Turizo (2019–2020)
- Snail Mail (2018–2019)
- Eslabon Armado (2021–2022)
- Callista Clark (2021–2022)
- Juice Wrld (2018–2019)
- Victoria Justice (2011–2012)
- Zendaya (2015–2016)
- Cher Lloyd (2012–2013)
- Troye Sivan (2014–2015)
- Lil Pump (2018–2019)
- Bhad Bhabie (2018–2019)
- Lil Tjay (2020–2021)
- Mac Miller (2011–2012)
- Bridgit Mendler (2012–2013)
- 310babii (2024-2025)
- Katseye (2025–2026)
- Ty Myers (2025–2026)
- Laila! (2025–2026)
- Maddox Batson (2025–2026)
- Waylon Wyatt (2025–2026)
- Najeeriii (2025–2026)
