= Attitude (Don Toliver song) =

Single by Don Toliver featuring Charlie Wilson and Cash Cobain

from the album Hardstone Psycho
- Released: May 22, 2024
- Genre: Drill
- Length: 2:41
- Label: Cactus Jack; Atlantic; We Run It
- Songwriters: Caleb Toliver; Charles Wilson; Cashmere Small; Calvin Broadus, Jr.; Pharrell Williams; Chad Hugo
- Producer: Cash Cobain

Don Toliver singles chronology
"Heavy Stunts" (2024)	"Attitude" (2024)	"Precision" (2024)

Charlie Wilson singles chronology
"Superman" (2023)	"Attitude" (2024)

Cash Cobain singles chronology
"Favorite Lady" (2024)	"Attitude" (2024)	"Grippy" (2024)

Music video
- "Attitude" on YouTube

"Attitude" (stylized in uppercase on Hardstone Psycho) is a song by American rapper and singer Don Toliver featuring fellow American singer Charlie Wilson and fellow American rapper and record producer Cash Cobain. It was released on through Cactus Jack, We Run It Inc and Atlantic Records as the third and final single from Toliver's fourth studio album, Hardstone Psycho, on May 22, 2024. Containing a drill instrumental, the song was written by all three artists. Wilson's vocals are sampled from Snoop Dogg's 2002 single, "Beautiful", which features him and Pharrell Williams, they and Chad Hugo are credited as songwriters as well.

== Music video ==
The official music video for "Attitude" was released alongside the song on May 22, 2024. It sees Toliver riding a motorcycle and wearing a leather jacket as it continues the story from the visuals of "Bandit" and "Deep in the Water", his previous two singles that were released earlier in the year and serve as the first two from its parent album, Hardstone Psycho. The video features a cameo appearance from his Cactus Jack Records label boss, fellow American rapper and singer Travis Scott.

== Charts ==
Chart performance for "Attitude"
Chart (2024)	Peak position
Canada Hot 100 (Billboard)	82
Global 200 (Billboard)	163
New Zealand Hot Singles (RMNZ)	20
US Billboard Hot 100	58
US Hot R&B/Hip-Hop Songs (Billboard)	16

== Certifications ==
Certifications for "Attitude"
Region	Certification	Certified units/sales
Canada (Music Canada)	Platinum	80,000^{‡}
^{‡} Sales+streaming figures based on certification alone.
