= Dunk Contest (song) =

2024 single by Cash Cobain

Single by Cash Cobain

from the album Play Cash Cobain
- Released: January 29, 2024
- Genre: Dirty rap; drill
- Length: 3:16
- Label: Giant
- Songwriters: Cashmere Small; Garland Jean
- Producers: Cash Cobain; Gvrlnd!

Cash Cobain singles chronology
"Rump" (2023)	"Dunk Contest" (2024)	"Fisherrr" (2024)

Music video
- "Dunk Contest" on YouTube

"Dunk Contest" is a single by American rapper Cash Cobain, released on January 29, 2024, as the lead single from his debut studio album, Play Cash Cobain. It was produced by Cobain himself and Gvrlnd!. An official remix of the song titled "Grippy" with American rapper J. Cole was released on May 24, 2024.

== Composition ==
The production loops synthesizers with the signature drum pattern of Cash Cobain's music. Lyrically, Cobain croons about the women he wants to have sex with, as he lists them by name, describes their features, and details the things he wants to do with each one. During the climax, he mentions a woman named Marni, whom he says he does not want to talk about before changing his mind and rapping about how he wants to spend time with her even though she frustrates his other women.

== Critical reception ==
Vibe's Armon Sadler gave a favorable review of the song, commenting Cash Cobain "blends humor, an active sex drive, and cool flows seamlessly yet again. If judges were ranking it, it wouldn't be a surprise if all of their placards showed 10s."

== Grippy ==
"Grippy"

Single by Cash Cobain and J. Cole
- Released: May 24, 2024
- Recorded: April 2024
- Length: 3:54
- Label: Giant
- Songwriters: Cashmere Small; Jermaine Cole; Garland Jean; DJ Matty Kats
- Producers: Cash Cobain; Gvrlnd!

Cash Cobain singles chronology
"Attitude" (2024)	"Grippy" (2024)	"Daylight" (2024)

J. Cole singles chronology
"H.Y.B." (2024)	"Grippy" (2024)	"Ruby Rosary" (2024)

"Grippy" is the official remix of "Dunk Contest" by Cash Cobain with J. Cole, released on May 24, 2024. According to Cobain, Cole recorded his verse toward the end of April 2024.

=== Composition ===
J. Cole opens the song with his verse, rapping about a female sexual partner whom he calls "Grippy" (in reference to her vagina). He mentions saving her in his phone as this nickname, details their sexual encounters and claims to have changed her sexual orientation from being homosexual to heterosexual. Cash Cobain's verses remain the same as in the original song.

=== Critical reception ===
The remix received generally positive reviews from music critics. Angel Diaz of Billboard regarded J. Cole's verse to be "pretty good as Cole continues to beat the 'he can't rap about sex and romance' allegations". Sophie Caraan of Hypebeast wrote "Cobain shines through and through as he elevates his subtle yet catchy signature sound, while Cole's early presence on the cut hears him settle in with the track's jumpy sonic space." Revolt's Jon Powell stated Cole "didn't disappoint" on his verse. Mankaprr Conteh of Rolling Stone wrote "Cole makes "'Grippy' less sexy, but even more fun. His verse is good, ol' fashioned fast-rap, where he impressively flips the same ending syllable a million different ways. And while we miss the begging-for-love-R&B of yesteryear, Cole does provide top-tier tricking". Tom Breihan of Stereogum praised Cole's performance, writing "It's still impressive to hear him pull off a flow that's very different from what he usually does. Cobain sounds more effortless, but that guy's not trying to do traditional rap bars, and Cole is." Aaron Williams of Uproxx remarked "The song is definitely closer Cobain's wheelhouse than Cole's, yet the veteran rapper easily adapts to the new style. Cole has proven his versatility throughout his career as a guest verse assassin, and in this case, he is just as solid as ever." Armon Sadler of Vibe wrote of Cole's verse, "Impressively, he maintains the same ending syllable rhyme throughout the entire verse and meshes to the sexy drill production with ease. The lyricism feels a bit nursery rhyme-like throughout the verse, but that's par for the course when Cole gets into his lusty iteration. Nonetheless, it's an okay verse and a major look for the rising Bronx talent. And it's never a bad thing to hear Cash run through his list of conquests from 'Dunk Contest' after J. Cole finishes up his verse."

Danilo Castro of HotNewHipHop had a positive reaction to Cash Cobain's performance, stating he "sounds slick as ever" and "the way he effortlessly glides over each little glitch and bouncy drum pattern feels symbiotic", but had a negative reaction toward J. Cole's feature, stating "there's something about Cash Cobain's production that trips him up. Cole starts the song, and while he has time to fire off a few memorable bars, he never really finds his footing. There's a reliance on Auto Tune that's unpleasant to the ear, and a repetitive rhyme scheme that makes sense, yet quickly runs out of steam. J. Cole is trying to approach 'Grippy' like most guest verses, but this is one of the first times where it sounds like he's blatantly chasing a trendy sound." Cole's verse also received a mixed-to-negative response from fans, with some even criticizing it on social media.

== Charts ==
Chart performance for "Grippy"
Chart (2024)	Peak position
New Zealand Hot Singles (RMNZ)	16
