= Pretty Girl (Ice Spice song) =

Single by Ice Spice featuring Rema
- Released: October 13, 2023
- Recorded: 2023
- Length: 2:17
- Label: 10K Projects; Capitol
- Composers: Blake Slatkin; Ephrem Lopez Jr.; Jasper Harris
- Lyricists: Isis Gaston; Divine Ikubor
- Producers: RiotUSA; Jasper Harris; Blake Slatkin

Ice Spice singles chronology
"Deli" (2023)	"Pretty Girl" (2023)	"Think U the Shit (Fart)" (2024)

Rema singles chronology
"Calm Down" (2022)	"Pretty Girl" (2023)	"Benin Boys" (2024)

Music video
- "Pretty Girl" on YouTube

"Pretty Girl" is a song by American rapper Ice Spice featuring Nigerian rapper and singer Rema, released on October 13, 2023, through 10K Projects and Capitol Records, as a standalone single. It marks the pair's first collaboration.

== Background and release ==
The song, at the time originally planned to be featured on the soundtrack of Spider-Man: Across the Spider-Verse, was initially teased in an advertisement for the film and the Hyundai Ioniq 6, released on May 10, 2023. On October 11, 2023, Ice Spice announced the song on social media, sharing its cover art. Her announcement followed the news that she would be the musical guest on the first episode of season 49 of Saturday Night Live, which aired on October 14. On October 13, 2023, the song was released. RiotUSA produced the instrumental of the song. The pair performed the song for the first time on the season premiere of Saturday Night Live with Taylor Swift introducing the performance.

The song was intended to be the lead single from Ice Spice's debut studio album Y2K!, but was shelved from the final tracklist for unknown reasons.

== Reception ==
Rolling Stone's Mankaprr Conteh described it as "simple and full of delicate synths until breaking out into fluttering polyrhythmic percussion".

== Charts ==
Chart performance for "Pretty Girl"
Chart (2023)	Peak position
Canada CHR/Top 40 (Billboard)	29
New Zealand Hot Singles (RMNZ)	24
Nigeria (TurnTable Top 100)	18
US Pop Airplay (Billboard)	28
US Rhythmic (Billboard)	21
US World Digital Song Sales (Billboard)	6

== Release history ==
Release dates and formats for "Pretty Girl"
Region	Date	Format	Label	Ref.
Various	October 13, 2023	Digital download; streaming	10K; Capitol	
United States	October 17, 2023	Contemporary hit radio	10K; Capitol	
Italy	October 20, 2023	Radio airplay	Universal	
