= Coke Boys 6 =

Mixtape by French Montana and DJ Drama
- Released: January 6, 2023
- Genre: 56:44
- Label: Coke Boys
- Producers: Boi-1da; Cool & Dre; Cubeatz; Frost; Mixx; Harry Fraud; ISM; Matthew Burnett; Miichkel; Oogie Mane; Pro Logic; Rippa on the Beat; Sahara; SprngBrk; YC; Young Martey

French Montana chronology
Montega (2022)	Coke Boys 6 (2023)	Mac & Cheese 5 (2024)

DJ Drama chronology
Rollin Stone (2023)	Coke Boys 6 (2023)

Alternative cover

Singles from Coke Boys 6
- 1. "Slidin" Released: July 22, 2022; 2. "Fenty" Released: October 21, 2022; 3. "Yes I Do" Released: November 11, 2022; 4. "Finesse" Released: November 28, 2022

Coke Boys 6 is a collaborative mixtape by Moroccan-American rapper French Montana and American disc jockey DJ Drama. It was released through Coke Boys Records on January 6, 2023.

The mixtape contains guest appearances from Stove God Cooks, Cheeze, the late Chinx, Smooky Margielaa, ASAP Rocky, Vory, Max B, Rob49, Ayoub, Jeremih, Benny the Butcher, DThang, EST Gee, Big30, Nav, King Combs, Kodak Black, and Pheelz. The "Money Heist Edition" of the mixtape was released simultaneously alongside the release of the original version. It contains additional guest appearances from Kenzo B, Mr.Chicken, LGP Qua, Tory Lanez, Chinese Kitty, YNP Maine, CJ, T Dot, Bando Gz, Viso, and Jhettaheat.

Production was handled by a variety of record producers, including Harry Fraud, Cubeatz, SprngBrk, ISM, Boi-1da, Matthew Burnett, Young Martey, Sahara, Cool & Dre, YC, Pro Logic, Frost, Rippa on the Beat, Miichkel, and Oogie Mane. The project serves as a mixtape for Gangsta Grillz, a mixtape series hosted by DJ Drama. It was originally supposed to be released on December 9, 2022, but it was delayed due to the release of Chinx's third studio album, CR6, which serves as the rapper's third posthumous project and was released exactly one week before the original release date of Coke Boys 6.

== Release and promotion ==
On November 8, 2022, the day before Montana's 38th birthday, he announced the release of the mixtape. On January 2, 2023, Montana announced that Coke Boys 6 would serve as a mixtape for Gangsta Grillz, a series of mixtapes by rappers that is hosted by DJ Drama.

=== Singles ===
The lead single of the mixtape, "Slidin", which was performed by Montana and his brother, Ayoub, was released on July 22, 2022. The second single, "Fenty", which was performed by Montana and Canadian rapper Nav, was released on October 21, 2022. The third single, "Yes I Do", which was performed by Montana, was released on November 11, 2022. The fourth single, "Finesse", which was performed by Nigerian record producer Pheelz and Montana himself, was released on November 28, 2022.

== Track listing ==
Coke Boys 6 track listing
No.	Title	Writer(s)	Producer(s)	Length
1.	"Intro" (with Stove God Cooks featuring Cheeze)	Karim Kharbouch; Tyree Simmons; Aaron Scott; Cheeze; Rory Quigley	Harry Fraud	5:03
2.	"The Oath" (performed by Chinx, DJ Drama, and French Montana)	Lionel Pickens; Simmons; K. Kharbouch		4:15
3.	"Chit Chat" (performed by French Montana, Smooky Margielaa, and ASAP Rocky featuring DJ Drama)	K. Kharbouch; Toumani Diabate; Rakim Mayers; Simmons		2:33
4.	"Yes I Do" (performed by French Montana)	K. Kharbouch; Tim Gomringer; Kevin Gomringer; Floyd Bentley; Ishmael Montague	Cubeatz; SprngBrk; ISM	2:03
5.	"Project Baby (Remix)" (performed by Vory, DJ Drama, and French Montana)	Tavoris Hollins, Jr.; Simmons; K. Kharbouch; Matthew Samuels; Matthew Burnett; Patrik Martey	Boi-1da; Burnett; Young Martey	2:37
6.	"Max B Skit" (performed by Max B)	Charley Wingate		1:26
7.	"Not So Bad"	K. Kharbouch; Simmons
8.	"Igloo" (with Rob49)	K. Kharbouch; Simmons; Robert Thomas; T. Gomringer; K. Gomringer; Bentley; Montague	Cubeatz; SprngBrk; ISM	3:36
9.	"Slidin" (performed by French Montana and Ayoub)	K. Kharbouch; Ayoub Kharbouch; Kaj Blokhuis	Sahara	2:58
10.	"Choose You" (with Jeremih)	K. Kharbouch; Simmons; Jeremy Felton		2:28
11.	"RZA" (with Benny the Butcher)	K. Kharbouch; Simmons; Jeremie Pennick; Marcello Valenzano; Andre Lyon	Cool & Dre	2:48
12.	"Die in the Streets" (performed by DThang and DJ Drama)	Daniel Collins; Simmons		1:51
13.	"Free Smoke" (performed by French Montana, EST Gee, and DJ Drama featuring Big30)	K. Kharbouch; George Stone III; Simmons; Rodney Wright, Jr.; Christopher Pearson	YC	3:01
14.	"Fenty" (performed by French Montana and Nav)	K. Kharbouch; Navraj Goraya; Andrew Franklin; Sugar-Ray Henry	Pro Logic; Frost	2:58
15.	"Lemonade" (performed by Max B and DJ Drama)	Wingate; Simmons		1:41
16.	"Going Yeezy" (with Cheeze)	Kharbouch; Simmons; Cheeze		3:14
17.	"New Punani" (with Cheeze)	K. Kharbouch; Simmons; Cheeze		3:26
18.	"Addicted to You" (with Cheeze)	K. Kharbouch; Simmons; Cheeze		2:48
19.	"Can't Stop Won't Stop (Remix)" (performed by King Combs, French Montana, and DJ Drama featuring Kodak Black)	Justin Combs; K. Kharbouch; Simmons; Bill Kapri; Ricardo Toussaint	Rippa on the Beat	3:23
20.	"Finesse" (performed by Pheelz and French Montana)	Phillip Moses; K. Kharbouch; Daniel Benson	Miichkel	2:06
Total length:				56:44

Coke Boys 6: Money Heist Edition track listing
No.	Title	Writer(s)	Producer(s)	Length
21.	"Gang Gang" (performed by Kenzo B, DJ Drama, and DThang featuring King Combs)	Te'arah Gaine; Simmons; Collins; Combs; Quigley	Harry Fraud	2:39
22.	"Forever" (with Mr.Chicken)	K. Kharbouch; Simmons; Mr.Chicken		2:57
23.	"Earned" (performed by LGP Qua, DJ Drama, and Tory Lanez)	Qidere Johnson; Simmons; Daystar Peterson; Jordan Ortiz	Oogie Mane	2:26
24.	"Da 30" (performed by DThang and DJ Drama)	Collins; Simmons	Mixx	2:58
25.	"Cbtd" (performed by Chinese Kitty and DJ Drama)	Taylor Hing; Simmons		2:35
26.	"Voices" (performed by YNP Maine and DJ Drama)	YNP Maine; Simmons		3:48
27.	"Big Dog Status" (performed by C3 and DJ Drama)	C3; Simmons		3:28
28.	"Get Even" (performed by T Dot, DJ Drama, and Bando Gz)	T Dot; Simmons; Bando Gz		1:49
29.	"Tryin to Get a Bloc" (performed by Viso, Jhettaheat, and DJ Drama)	Viso; Jhettaheat; Simmons		2:50
Total length:				82:17

== Personnel ==
- Mix engineer: Baruch "Mixx" Nembhard
- Mastering engineer: Eric Lagg

== Charts ==
Chart performance for Coke Boys 6
Chart (2023)	Peak position
US Billboard 200	11
