= Brother Stone =

2024 song by Don Toliver featuring Kodak Black

Song by Don Toliver featuring Kodak Black

from the album Hardstone Psycho
- Released: June 14, 2024
- Length: 3:22
- Label: Cactus Jack; Atlantic
- Songwriters: Caleb Toliver; Bill Kapri; Edgar Ferrera; Derek Anderson
- Producers: SkipOnDaBeat; 206Derek

Music video
- "Brother Stone" on YouTube

"Brother Stone" is a song by American rapper Don Toliver featuring American rapper Kodak Black from the former's fourth studio album, Hardstone Psycho (2024). It was produced by SkipOnDaBeat and 206Derek.

== Composition and critical reception ==
Zachary Horvath of HotNewHipHop gave a positive review, writing "the beat commands your attention right away. The twinkly and haunting piano melodies, along with the thumping bass and punchy kick drums add up for a winner of an instrumental. Kodak is arguably the best part of it though, with his stop-start flow and energetic delivery. Don also does his thing, keeping the engines revved." Robin Murray of Clash commented that Don Toliver and Kodak Black "work perfectly on a club shaker", while Gabriel Bras Nevares of HotNewHipHop commented they "flow like volatile but relentless gas leaks" on the song.

== Music video ==
An official music video was released on June 15, 2024. It sees the rappers partying at Don Toliver's home with strippers and lowriders and also at a nightclub. Rappers Travis Scott and Trae tha Truth make cameos, in the club.

== Charts ==
Chart performance for "Brother Stone"
Chart (2024)	Peak position
Canada Hot 100 (Billboard)	59
Global 200 (Billboard)	121
New Zealand Hot Singles (RMNZ)	7
US Billboard Hot 100	61
US Hot R&B/Hip-Hop Songs (Billboard)	18

== Certifications ==
Certifications for "Brother Stone"
Region	Certification	Certified units/sales
Canada (Music Canada)	Gold	40,000^{‡}
^{‡} Sales+streaming figures based on certification alone.
