= Kryptonite (Don Toliver song) =

2024 song by Don Toliver

Song by Don Toliver

from the album Hardstone Psycho
- Released: June 14, 2024
- Genre: Trap
- Length: 3:02
- Label: Cactus Jack; Atlantic
- Songwriters: Caleb Toliver; Daniel Perez; Raynford Humphrey; Derek Anderson; Bryan Yepes; Calvin Tarvin; Kevin Yancey; Alien; Spikes
- Producers: Bugz Ronin; Preme; 206Derek; Bryvn; Tiggi; Kevo; Alien; Spikes

"Kryptonite" is a song by American rapper Don Toliver from his fourth studio album, Hardstone Psycho (2024). It was produced by Bugz Ronin, Preme, 206Derek, Bryvn, Tiggi, Kevo, Alien and Spikes.

== Composition ==
The song opens with the sound of a motor revving and whistling synth, followed by a trap beat with airy but distorted electric guitar chords.

== Critical reception ==
Robin Murray of Clash described the rock influences on the song as "jarring". Gabriel Bras Nevares of HotNewHipHop wrote the song's production, "plus a longing plea for love and weakness in the face of chaotic and high-speed vices, set the stage for what Don Toliver does most successfully and consistently on HARDSTONE PSYCHO."

== Charts ==
Chart performance for "Kryptonite"
Chart (2024)	Peak position
Canada Hot 100 (Billboard)	96
New Zealand Hot Singles (RMNZ)	14
US Billboard Hot 100	98
US Hot R&B/Hip-Hop Songs (Billboard)	29

== Certifications ==
Certifications for "Kryptonite"
Region	Certification	Certified units/sales
Canada (Music Canada)	Gold	40,000^{‡}
^{‡} Sales+streaming figures based on certification alone.
