= WTHelly =

2025 single by Rob49

Single by Rob49

from the album Let Me Fly
- Released: March 20, 2025
- Recorded: 2024
- Genre: Hip hop
- Length: 2:17
- Label: Rebel; Geffen
- Songwriters: Robert Thomas; Rodney Perez; Timofey Isaev; Sheldon Gadson; Virga Paul-Emanuel
- Producers: WhoIsRodney; Blasty; Sheldon; Paul Monstereal

Rob49 singles chronology
| "Yessirski" (2025) | "WTHelly" (2025) |

Music video
- "WTHelly" on YouTube

"WTHelly" (pronounced "what the helly") is a song by American rapper Rob49, released on March 20, 2025. It was produced by WhoIsRodney, Blasty, Sheldon, and Paul Monstereal. It is the second single from Rob49's debut studio album, Let Me Fly.

== Background ==
In an interview with Complex, Rob49 revealed he had created "WTHelly" after a video shoot with Cardi B in New York City and New Jersey, at a studio session that was originally for rapper Skilla Baby, who was tired. Rob49 freestyled the song, and he and his crew did not leave the studio until six in the morning. He recalls:

They was in the booth with me. All of us was in the booth together. We was coming up with it together like, "You said something, what you said? Alright bet, I'm gonna say it." We were just saying, "What the hell?" I said, "Man, I'm about to make 'What The Hell' right now." And they were like, "Come on, let's do it." And all of us went in the booth. Like, I said all that together. I swear to God, if you go look at the session, it's going to be one long session until I get to my verse. I think that's what makes it feel so good. It was just roaming through the city, through New Orleans. Four girls in the studio, all the rest just the bros.

Rob49 also said in the interview that he made a remix of the song with rapper G Herbo in December 2024.

According to Rob49, "What the helly" was just a phrase that he and his friends came up with.

== Content ==
The lyrics revolve around Rob49 charming women by extravagantly buying them luxuries. He speaks ill of their boyfriends at one point, calling one of them a "bum". Rob49 also name-drops many celebrities, rapping "What the helly, Berry / What the helly, Burton / What the helly, 'Bron James / What the helly, Cyrus".

== Critical reception ==
Vivian Medithi of The Fader commented the song "brings to mind the lethal and discontinued Panera Bread Charged Lemonade, amped up to the brink of gibberish" and that its "titular repetition seems perfectly honed to needle oldheads", before adding "Then again, that's probably a big part of why this song has been going ultraviral — it's too insistent to leave anything other than an indelible mark."

=== Song's rise on TikTok ===
"WTHelly" quickly achieved popularity on social media, especially on TikTok where it first gained momentum and sparked a viral trend of lip-dub videos.

== Remixes ==
Four official remixes of the song are planned to be released. They feature singer Justin Bieber and rappers Big Sean, G Herbo, and Latto.

== Charts ==
=== Weekly charts ===
Weekly chart performance for "WTHelly"
| Chart (2025) | Peak position |
|---|---|
| US Bubbling Under Hot 100 Singles (Billboard) | 16 |
| US Hot R&B/Hip-Hop Songs (Billboard) | 25 |
| US Rhythmic (Billboard) | 34 |

=== Year-end charts ===
Year-end chart performance for "WTHelly"
| Chart (2025) | Position |
|---|---|
| US Hot R&B/Hip-Hop Songs (Billboard) | 92 |
