= Montega =

Studio album by French Montana and Harry Fraud
- Released: June 24, 2022
- Genre: Hip hop
- Length: 38:04
- Label: Coke Boys

French Montana chronology
They Got Amnesia (2021)	Montega (2022)	Coke Boys 6 (2023)

Harry Fraud chronology
Hoffa (2021)	Montega (2022)

Professional ratings
Review scores
Source	Rating
Allmusic	4/5 stars
HipHopDX	3.6/5
Rolling Stone	3.5/5 stars

Montega is a collaborative studio album by Moroccan-American hip hop recording artist French Montana and American record producer Harry Fraud, released on June 24, 2022 by Coke Boys Records. It features guest appearances by Babyface Ray, Benny the Butcher, Chinx, EST Gee, Fleurie, Jadakiss, Quavo and Rick Ross. The album is entirely produced by Harry Fraud.

== Track listing ==
- Track listing adapted from Apple Music.
- All tracks produced by Harry Fraud.

Montega track listing
No.	Title	Writer(s)	Length
1.	"Blue Chills"	Karim Kharbouch; Rory Quigley; Skylar Gudasz	2:51
2.	"Rushmore Pack"	Kharbouch; Quigley; Frederick Thomas	2:52
3.	"Drive By" (featuring Babyface Ray)	Kharbouch; Quigley; Ioanna Gika; Marcellus Register	3:41
4.	"Keep It Real" (with EST Gee)	Kharbouch; Quigley; George Stone III	3:47
5.	"Kind of Girl" (with Rick Ross)	Kharbouch; Quigley; William Roberts II; Rakim Mayers; Lou Courtney	2:57
6.	"Higher"	Kharbouch; Quigley; Everton Blender	4:17
7.	"Bricks & Bags" (with Jadakiss featuring Benny the Butcher)	Kharbouch; Quigley; Jason Phillips; Jeremie Pennick	3:42
8.	"Poetic With No Justice"	Kharbouch; Quigley	2:49
9.	"Drop Top" (with Quavo)	Kharbouch; Quigley; Quavious Marshall; Andre Young	2:33
10.	"Shorty So Bad"	Kharbouch; Quigley	2:33
11.	"Drunk Words, Sober Thoughts" (with Chinx)	Kharbouch; Quigley; Lionel Pickens; Marie Warwick	2:49
12.	"Bronx Mecca" (with Fleurie)	Kharbouch; Quigley; Lauren Strahm	3:13
Total length:			38:04

Montega (Deluxe edition)
No.	Title	Writer(s)	Length
13.	"Run That Bag Up"	Kharbouch; Quigley	2:41
14.	"Everything I Do"	Kharbouch; Quigley	3:17
Total length:			44:02

== Charts ==
Chart performance for Montega
Chart (2022)	Peak position
US Billboard 200	46
US Top R&B/Hip-Hop Albums (Billboard)	22
