= Topia Twins =

2023 song by Travis Scott featuring Rob49 and 21 Savage

Song by Travis Scott featuring Rob49 and 21 Savage

from the album Utopia
- Released: July 28, 2023
- Recorded: 2022
- Studio: Shangri-La (California)
- Genre: Trap
- Length: 3:43
- Label: Cactus Jack; Epic
- Songwriters: Jacques Webster; Robert Thomas; Shéyaa Abraham-Joseph; Amir Esmailian; Wesley Glass; Oliver Rodigan; Dylan Cleary-Krell; Henri Velasco
- Producers: Scott; Wheezy; Cadenza; Dez Wright (add.); Hoops (add.)

"Topia Twins" is a song by American rapper Travis Scott featuring fellow American rapper Rob49 and Atlanta-based rapper 21 Savage from the former's fourth studio album Utopia (2023). The song was produced by Scott, Wheezy, and Cadenza, with additional from Dez Wright and Hoops. A song of the trap subgenre, the lyrics orientate around the rappers' voluptuaries.

== Critical reception ==
The song received generally positive reviews from music critics. Robin Murray of Clash described it as a "club-focused bouncer". Mike Destefano of Complex said, "the song that has stuck with me is 'Topia Twins.' As much as I love the experimental tracks on Utopia, this feels like one of those classic Travis Scott tracks to me that was great to hear after waiting five years since Astroworld dropped. Rob49 and 21 Savage deliver some of the best rapping on the project." He also regarded Rob49's verse in the song to be the best feature of Utopia, while commenting 21 Savage has a "great feature verse" as well. In a review of Utopia, Alphonse Pierre of Pitchfork stated "one of the basic attributes we expect from rappers is to be real with us, or at least convince us that they're not purely bullshitting", before commenting that "blank moshpit-ready tracks such as 'Topia Twins' just come off as deflections." Andre Gee of Rolling Stone said, "One immediately wants to hear Rob49 again after Scott follows up his short verse on 'Topia Twins.'" Aron A. of HotNewHipHop wrote that Rob49 highlights his talents in the song, but 21 Savage's verse "doesn't necessarily add anything exciting to 'TOPIA TWINS.'" Vulture's Craig Jenkins stated the song "benefits from 21's deadpanned threats".

Mackenzie Cummings-Grady of Billboard placed the song at number 18 (second-to-last) in her ranking of the songs from Utopia.

== Charts ==
=== Weekly charts ===
Weekly chart performance for "Topia Twins"
Chart (2023)	Peak position
Australia (ARIA)	29
Australia Hip Hop/R&B (ARIA)	15
Canada Hot 100 (Billboard)	17
Czech Republic Singles Digital (ČNS IFPI)	32
France (SNEP)	60
Global 200 (Billboard)	17
Greece International (IFPI)	28
Hungary (Single Top 40)	29
Iceland (Tónlistinn)	10
Italy (FIMI)	58
Latvia (LAIPA)	15
Lithuania (AGATA)	36
Luxembourg (Billboard)	20
New Zealand (Recorded Music NZ)	17
Norway (VG-lista)	37
Poland (Polish Streaming Top 100)	22
Portugal (AFP)	34
South Africa (Billboard)	20
Sweden Heatseeker (Sverigetopplistan)	2
UK Audio Streaming (OCC)	54
US Billboard Hot 100	17
US Hot R&B/Hip-Hop Songs (Billboard)	10

=== Year-end charts ===
Year-end chart performance for "Topia Twins"
Chart (2023)	Position
US Hot R&B/Hip-Hop Songs (Billboard)	99

== Certifications ==
Certifications for "Topia Twins"
Region	Certification	Certified units/sales
Brazil (Pro-Música Brasil)	Platinum	40,000^{‡}
Canada (Music Canada)	Platinum	80,000^{‡}
New Zealand (RMNZ)	Gold	15,000^{‡}
Poland (ZPAV)	Gold	25,000^{‡}
United States (RIAA)	Platinum	1,000,000^{‡}
^{‡} Sales+streaming figures based on certification alone.
