= Hardstone Psycho =

Studio album by Don Toliver
- Released: June 14, 2024
- Recorded: 2023–2024
- Genre: Trap
- Length: 51:50
- Labels: Cactus Jack; Atlantic
- Producers: 206Derek; Alien; Bbykobe; Bnyx; Broadday; Bryvn; Buddy Ross; Bugz Ronin; Cash Cobain; Charlie Handsome; Coleman; Dez Wright; Edgard Herrera; FKi 1st; Gabe Shaddow; Honorable C.N.O.T.E.; IWantDior; Jahaan Sweet; Kevo; Los Hendrix; Matty Spats; Metro Boomin; Mikey Freedom Hart; Nik D; OhRoss; Oz; Psymun; ReidMD; Pilgrim; PoWR Trav; Preme; Sb Josh; Sir Dylan; SkipOnDaBeat; Spikes; Tiggi; Tommy Parker; Toom; Vendr; Zaytoven

Don Toliver chronology
Love Sick (2023)	Hardstone Psycho (2024)	Octane (2026)

Singles from Hardstone Psycho
- 1. "Bandit" Released: February 1, 2024; 2. "Deep in the Water" Released: March 14, 2024; 3. "Attitude" Released: May 22, 2024

Hardstone Psycho is the fourth studio album by American rapper and singer Don Toliver. It was released through Cactus Jack and Atlantic Records on June 14, 2024.

The album features guest appearances from Kodak Black, Charlie Wilson, Cash Cobain, Travis Scott, Future, Metro Boomin, and Teezo Touchdown. The deluxe version of the album was released exclusively on Toliver's website four days later before being published on streaming services on June 25, 2024 and features additional guest appearances from Lil Uzi Vert and Yeat.

Production on the album was handled by Cash Cobain and Metro Boomin themselves, alongside Bugz Ronin, Preme, Mikey Freedom Hart, Bnyx, Zaytoven, Honorable C.N.O.T.E., Wheezy, Psymun, Buddy Ross, Oz, FKi 1st, and Charlie Handsome, among others. It serves as the follow-up to Toliver's previous album, Love Sick (2023).

Hardstone Psycho was supported by three singles: "Bandit", "Deep in the Water", and "Attitude", the latter of which features Charlie Wilson and Cash Cobain. The album received generally positive reviews from music critics and was a commercial success. It debuted at number three on the US Billboard 200 chart, earning 76,500 album-equivalent units in its first week.

== Singles and promotion ==
On February 1, 2024, Toliver released the lead single of the album, "Bandit", alongside its music video, where its title was secretly revealed before it was announced. The same day, he took to Twitter to reveal that he would be releasing a new album soon.

On March 13, he revealed that it would be released in the summer that year through a post on social media, where he also secretly revealed its title. The following day, Toliver released the second single, "Deep in the Water", where he also secretly hinted at the title of the album again in its accompanying video.

On March 17, 2024, while performing at the hip hop music festival Rolling Loud at the SoFi Stadium in Inglewood, California, he confirmed the title of the album before performing the then-unreleased song from it titled "Tore Up" for the first time. On May 22, 2024, Toliver released the third and final single of the album, "Attitude", which features fellow American singer Charlie Wilson and fellow American rapper and record producer Cash Cobain, and also revealed its release date. He revealed its tracklist on June 12, 2024, his 30th birthday.

== Critical reception ==
Professional ratings
Review scores
Source	Rating
AllMusic	2.5/5 stars
Clash	7/10
RapReviews	7/10

Robin Murray's review for Clash concludes: "It's fun, and for the most part is executed perfectly, underlining his position in the upper echelons of the new rap generation." Gabriel Nevares's review on HotNewHipHop credited the album as being Toliver's "most exhilarating album" at the time, praising its production rock influence, though noting its weak points in songwriting. Steve 'Flash' Juon on RapReviews commended the album's 'polished' production while also commenting on its comparatively weaker lyrics.

== Track listing ==
Volume A: Thunder Road
No.	Title	Writer(s)	Producer(s)	Length
1.	"Kryptonite"	Caleb Toliver; Daniel Perez; Raynford Humphrey; Derek Anderson; Bryan Yepes; Calvin Tarvin; Kevin Yancey; Alien; Spikes	Bugz Ronin; Preme; 206Derek; Bryvn; Tiggi; Kevo; Alien; Spikes^{[a]}	3:02
2.	"Tore Up"	Toliver; Kobe Hood; Spikes; Bryan Donovan; Brian Nyberg; Derek Lamonica; Donny Moore; Justin Valliere	Bbykobe; Spikes^{[a]}	2:06
3.	"Brother Stone" (featuring Kodak Black)	Toliver; Bill Kapri; Edgard Ferrera; Anderson	SkipOnDaBeat; 206Derek^{[a]}	3:22
4.	"Attitude" (featuring Charlie Wilson and Cash Cobain)	Toliver; Charles Wilson; Cashmere Small; Calvin Broadus, Jr.; Pharrell Williams; Chad Hugo	Cash Cobain	2:41

Volume B: Dead Man's Canyon
No.	Title	Writer(s)	Producer(s)	Length
1.	"Bandit"	Toliver; Kevin Parker; Sean Reid	ReidMD	2:27
2.	"Glock"	Toliver; Whitney Houston; Kenneth Edmonds III; Michael Houston; John Mitchell; Thomas Lumpkins; Travis Flores	Tommy Parker; PoWR Trav	3:48
3.	"Ice Age" (featuring Travis Scott)	Toliver; Jacques Webster II; Mikey Freedom Hart; Small	Hart; Cash Cobain; Bnyx^{[a]}; 206Derek^{[a]}	3:38
4.	"4x4"	Toliver; Perez; Anderson; Yepes; Tommy Parker; Matthew Spatola; Sb Josh; Mitchell	Bugz Ronin; 206Derek; Bryvn; Parker; Matty Spats; Sb Josh	3:22

Volume C: Twin Peaks
No.	Title	Writer(s)	Producer(s)	Length
1.	"Purple Rain" (featuring Future and Metro Boomin)	Toliver; Nayvadius Wilburn; Leland Wayne; Xavier Dotson; Carlton Mays, Jr.; Anderson	Metro Boomin; Zaytoven; Honorable C.N.O.T.E.	3:27
2.	"New Drop"	Toliver; Wesley Glass; Simon Christensen; Ruby Mitchell; Dylan Cleary-Krell; Scotty Coleman	Wheezy; Psymun; Dez Wright; Coleman	3:37
3.	"Backstreets" (featuring Teezo Touchdown)	Toliver; Aaron Thomas; Carlos Muñoz; Yepes	Los Hendrix; Bryvn^{[a]}; 206Derek^{[a]}	3:17
4.	"Deep in the Water"	Toliver; Josiah Sherman; Cole Wainwright; Jackson Speets; Duprie Monroe; Anderson; Mitchell; Peter O'Grady; Léa Fourlin	Buddy Ross; OhRoss; IWantDior; Broadday; 206Derek	2:50

Volume D: Promise Land
No.	Title	Writer(s)	Producer(s)	Length
1.	"Inside" (featuring Travis Scott)	Toliver; J. Webster; Jahaan Sweet; Ozan Yildirim; Dylan Wiggins; Anderson; Yepes	Sweet; Oz; Sir Dylan; 206Derek; Bryvn	4:10
2.	"5 to 10"	Toliver; Yildirim; Anderson; Nik Frascona; Sherman	Oz; 206Derek; Nik D; Buddy Ross^{[a]}; FKi 1st^{[a]}; Charlie Handsome^{[a]}	3:13
3.	"Last Laugh"	Toliver; Thomas Herrick; Garrison Webster; Beck Norling; Edgard Herrera; Lumpkins	Toom; Vendr; Pilgrim; Herrera^{[a]}; Parker^{[a]}	4:01
4.	"Hardstone National Anthem"	Toliver; Saint Fort; Anderson; Spatola; Gabe Shaddow; Lumpkins	Bnyx; 206Derek; Matty Spats; Shaddow; Tommy Parker	2:41
Total length:				51:50

Volume E: Stonehenge (deluxe edition)
No.	Title	Writer(s)	Producer(s)	Length
1.	"Rockstar Girl"	Toliver; Danny Snodgrass, Jr.; Michael Romito; Rio Leyva; Noah Mejia; Herrera; Glokid	Taz Taylor; Census; Leyva; Mejia; Young Era; Glokid; SkipOnDaBeat^{[a]}	2:58
2.	"Love Is a Drug"	Toliver; Dijon McFarlane	Mustard	3:09
3.	"Donny Darko" (featuring Lil Uzi Vert)	Toliver; Symere Woods; Saint Fort; Yepes; Ferrera	Bnyx; Bryvn; SkipOnDaBeat	1:57
4.	"Geeked Up" (featuring Yeat)	Toliver; Noah Smith; Perez; Yepes; Hood	Bugz Ronin; Bryvn; Bbykobe	2:38
Total length:				62:21

Notes

- All tracks are stylized in all caps. For example, "Kryptonite" is stylized as "KRYPTONITE".
- "Attitude" contains samples from "Beautiful", written by Calvin Broadus Jr., Pharrell Williams, and Chad Hugo as performed by Snoop Dogg featuring Pharrell Williams and Charlie Wilson.
- "Bandit" contains samples from "One More Hour", written and performed by Kevin Parker under the project name Tame Impala.

== Personnel ==
- Don Toliver – vocals
- Joe LaPorta – mastering
- Derek "206derek" Anderson – mixing, recording (all tracks except "Tore Up", "Glock", "Ice Age", and "Last Laugh")
- Edgard Herrera – recording on "Kryptonite", "Tore Up", "Attitude", "Glock", "Ice Age", and "Last Laugh"
- Zeke Mishanec – recording on "Ice Age"
- Stan Greene – mixing assistance on "Bandit"
- Patrick Gardner – engineering assistance on "Bandit"
- Spikes – guitar on "Kryptonite" and "Tore Up"
- FKA Twigs – additional vocals on "Kryptonite"
- Cash Cobain – vocals and keyboards on "Attitude"
- Charlie Wilson – vocals on "Attitude"
- Teezo Touchdown – additional vocals on "Backstreets"

== Charts ==
=== Weekly charts ===
Weekly chart performance for Hardstone Psycho
Chart (2024)	Peak position
Australian Albums (ARIA)	16
Australian Hip Hop/R&B Albums (ARIA)	4
Belgian Albums (Ultratop Flanders)	21
Belgian Albums (Ultratop Wallonia)	17
Canadian Albums (Billboard)	7
Danish Albums (Hitlisten)	19
Dutch Albums (Album Top 100)	14
Finnish Albums (Suomen virallinen lista)	34
French Albums (SNEP)	27
German Albums (Offizielle Top 100)	16
Hungarian Albums (MAHASZ)	12
Icelandic Albums (Tónlistinn)	7
Irish Albums (Official Charts)	42
Italian Albums (FIMI)	41
Lithuanian Albums (AGATA)	12
New Zealand Albums (RMNZ)	6
Norwegian Albums (VG-lista)	7
Polish Albums (ZPAV)	26
Portuguese Albums (AFP)	6
Spanish Albums (Promusicae)	60
Swiss Albums (Schweizer Hitparade)	4
UK Albums (Official Charts)	27
UK R&B Albums (Official Charts)	7
US Billboard 200	3
US Top R&B/Hip-Hop Albums (Billboard)	1

=== Year-end charts ===
Year-end chart performance for Hardstone Psycho
Chart (2024)	Position
US Billboard 200	163
US Top R&B/Hip-Hop Albums (Billboard)	46

== Certifications ==
Certifications for Hardstone Psycho
Region	Certification	Certified units/sales
Canada (Music Canada)	Platinum	80,000^{‡}
New Zealand (RMNZ)	Gold	7,500^{‡}
United Kingdom (BPI)	Silver	60,000^{‡}
United States (RIAA)	Gold	500,000^{‡}
^{‡} Sales+streaming figures based on certification alone.
