= Wassam Baby =

2024 single by Rob49 and Lil Wayne

Single by Rob49 and Lil Wayne
- Released: January 19, 2024
- Genre: Southern hip hop; trap
- Length: 2:13
- Label: Rebel; Geffen
- Songwriters: Robert Thomas; Dwayne Carter Jr.; Paul Williams
- Producer: Mac Fly

Rob49 singles chronology
"6.2 Music" (2023)	"Wassam Baby" (2024)	"Back From That" (2024)

Lil Wayne singles chronology
"Transparency" (2023)	"Wassam Baby" (2024)	"Came Out A Beast" (2024)

Music video
- "Wassam Baby" on YouTube

"Wassam Baby" is a song by American rappers Rob49 and Lil Wayne, released on January 19, 2024 along with a music video. It was produced by Mac Fly.

== Background ==
In an interview with Angela Yee on her radio show Way Up, Rob49 stated he had been telling rapper Mack Maine that he wanted to collaborate with Lil Wayne on a song. Maine called him one day and told him that Lil Wayne wanted his phone number. That night, Rob49 went to the studio and made "Wassam Baby". He said, "we knew we needed someone from New Orleans on it."

The song leaked online months before its release, which frustrated Rob49.

== Composition ==
"Wassam Baby" is a Southern hip hop-influenced song with a trap beat consisting of piano and 808s. Rob49, whose performance in the song has been described as "raunchy", expresses his liking for women across the nation in the chorus, before delivering a short verse. Lil Wayne performs the next verse and his lyrics also revolve around having sex with women.

== Critical reception ==
The song received generally positive reviews. Zachary Horvath of HotNewHipHop wrote that Rob49 "handles a quick verse, but his hook is the best part of his performance. It has a nice pace and it will work its way into your head right from the get-go." Andre Gee of Rolling Stone commented that "Rob's booming baritone orients the track, with his voice jostling against quaking 808s like a pinball machine", and his "New Orleans rasp cut through at precise inflections of his braggadocious verse where he demonstrates why he's one of rap's more intriguing — and nastier — listens." Marisa Mendez of HipHopDX remarked the song "features Rob49 coming in hot with a rapid-fire beat and braggadocious swagger, followed by Wayne joining with his infamous lighter flick for a breakout verse with serious wordplay in typical Tunechi fashion."

== Music video ==
The music video was directed by Frankie of Freewater. In it, the rappers hang out together and are surrounded by women, with cars and shots of Rob49's grill. They are also seen on a sound stage.

== Charts ==
Chart performance for "Wassam Baby"
Chart (2024)	Peak position
US Bubbling Under Hot 100 (Billboard)	12
US Hot R&B/Hip-Hop Songs (Billboard)	47
