= Gimmie a Light =

2024 single by Ice Spice

Single by Ice Spice

from the album Y2K!
- Released: May 10, 2024
- Genre: Hip hop; drill
- Length: 2:06
- Label: 10K Projects; Capitol
- Songwriters: Isis Gaston; Ephrem Lopez Jr.; Sean Henriques; Troyton Rami
- Producer: RiotUSA

Ice Spice singles chronology
"Fisherrr (Remix)" (2024)	"Gimmie a Light" (2024)	"Phat Butt" (2024)

Music video
- "Gimmie a Light" on YouTube

"Gimmie a Light" is a song by American rapper Ice Spice, released on May 10, 2024, as the second single from her debut studio album Y2K!. Produced by RiotUSA, it contains a sample of "Gimme the Light" by Sean Paul.

== Background ==
Ice Spice first premiered the song during her performance at Coachella in April 2024. On May 8, she previewed the song via a snippet on Instagram, before releasing it two days later. The song impacted rhythmic contemporary radio in the US on May 21.

In an interview with Zane Lowe on Beats 1, Ice Spice revealed she was nervous about sampling "Gimme the Light" as she worried it would not be cleared due to the song being an iconic hit.

== Composition and lyrics ==
The song flips "Gimme the Light" into a Bronx drill beat, slowing down the sampled lyrics as Ice Spice raps with aggression. In the chorus, she raps, "Hot boxin' the V, like, give me a light / Fat ass so the pants fit tight / Took her man, I'm gettin' him right / Big knock, like, why would I fight?" Ice Spice also takes shots at fellow rapper Latto: "Like, why would I beef with a flop? (Grrah) / Like let's talk drill (Grrah) / Who bigger than she? (Like) / Who prettier too? (Like) / Two-fifty to get in the booth (Damn)."

== Critical reception ==
Jo Vito of Consequence stated the song features an "upbeat, hard-hitting arrangement, which serves as a perfect platform for Ice Spice's rip-roaring flow." Sarah Kearns of Hypebeast called it a "bouncy rap track that sees Spice deliver her typical witty bars." Zachary Horvath of HotNewHipHop considered it a "solid track" for Y2K!.

== Music video ==
The music video was directed by Ice Spice alongside Frederick and George Buford and released with the single. In it, Spice twerks and smokes inside a pink Range Rover with a "Y2K" license plate. The car is being tailed by a crew of bikers and smoke from Spice's cigarette pour from the windows. Ice Spice also flashes stacks of cash and hangs out at a crowded party in a club, where she is seen sipping a drink. The Range Rover was previously owned by rapper Cam'ron, who used it in his videos for "Get Em Girls" and "Killa Cam".

== Charts ==
Chart performance
Chart (2024)	Peak position
New Zealand Hot Singles (RMNZ)	24

== Release history ==
Release dates and formats
Region	Date	Format	Label	Ref.
Various	May 10, 2024	Digital download; streaming	10K Projects; Capitol	
United States	May 21, 2024	Rhythmic contemporary radio	10K Projects; Capitol	
