= Oh Shhh... =

2024 song by Ice Spice and Travis Scott

Single by Ice Spice and Travis Scott

from the album Y2K!
- Released: July 26, 2024
- Genre: Drill; trap
- Length: 2:41
- Label: 10K Projects; Capitol
- Songwriters: Isis Gaston; Jacques Webster II; Ephrem Lopez Jr.; Joshua Goldin-McCarthy
- Producers: RiotUSA; Goldin

Ice Spice singles chronology
"Did It First" (2024)	"Oh Shhh..." (2024)	"Popa" (2024)

Travis Scott singles chronology
"Parking Lot" (2024)	"Oh Shhh..." (2024)	"Active" (2024)

Music video
- "Oh Shhh..." on YouTube

"Oh Shhh..." is a song by American rappers Ice Spice and Travis Scott. It was released through 10K Projects and Capitol Records from the former's debut studio album, Y2K!, on July 26, 2024, along with the album. The two artists wrote the song with producers RiotUSA and Goldin. On July 11, 2024, Travis Scott performed at the Tottenham Hotspur Stadium in London, England as part of his Circus Maximus Tour, where he brought Ice Spice out to perform the song for the first time, along with two more of the latter's singles, "Deli" from 2023 and the other Y2K! song "Think U the Shit (Fart)" from early 2024.

== Music video ==
The official music video for "Oh Shhh...", directed by George Buford, was released on July 26, 2024. It was shot in Ice Spice's home state of New York. The video starts with her being inside a glass case in a museum as an exhibit as elders look at her. She then goes to Ellis Island to see New York City's Statue of Liberty and dresses up herself, where she wears a green dress and uses a stack of cash as she holds up a torch and wears a crown. She then meets up with Travis Scott at the Asian fusion restaurant Sei Less, which he name-drops in his verse on the song, where they are served with a meal of the entire menu. He pours some liquid from a can of Cacti, his hard seltzer brand, on Ice Spice as she twerks and then holds up a bunch of grapes to the camera as the video ends with the city burning down.

== Charts ==
Chart performance for "Oh Shhh..."
Chart (2024)	Peak position
New Zealand Hot Singles (RMNZ)	15
US Bubbling Under Hot 100 (Billboard)	19
US Hot R&B/Hip-Hop Songs (Billboard)	36
