= Y2K! =

- Standard cover

Studio album by Ice Spice
- Released: July 26, 2024
- Recorded: September 2023 – March 2024
- Genres: Drill; hip-hop; jersey club
- Length: 23:17
- Labels: 10K Projects; Capitol
- Producers: DJH; Goldin; Lily Kaplan; Nico Baran; Ojivolta; RiotUSA; Synthetic; Upmadeit; Venny

Ice Spice chronology
| Like..? (2023) | Y2K! (2024) | Rosadita (2027) |

Singles from Y2K!
- 1. "Think U the Shit (Fart)" Released: January 26, 2024; 2. "Gimmie a Light" Released: May 10, 2024; 3. "Phat Butt" Released: June 21, 2024; 4. "Did It First" Released: July 11, 2024; 5. "Oh Shhh..." Released: July 26, 2024; 6. "Popa" Released: September 13, 2024

Y2K! is the debut studio album by American rapper Ice Spice. It was released through 10K Projects and Capitol Records on July 26, 2024. It features guest appearances from American rappers Travis Scott and Gunna, alongside British rapper Central Cee. The album's deluxe version was released on December 25, 2024, with features guest appearances from American rappers NLE Choppa and DaBaby, alongside Spanish rapper Bb trickz and Puerto Rican rapper Anuel AA. Production on the album was handled by RiotUSA, Goldin, Synthetic, Upmadeit, Ojivolta, DJH, Nico Baran, Lily Kaplan, and Venny, among others.

Upon its release, the album received generally mixed reviews from music critics, with praise given for its production and fun nature, but criticism aimed at its perceived repetitiveness, short length, and songwriting.

== Background ==
Her music career had a humble beginnings as she started rapping by releasing a few songs between 2020 and 2021. In September 2022, she signed a record deal with 10K Projects, in which serves as an imprint of Capitol Records. Ice Spice gained popularity during the release of her debut extended play, Like..? (2023). Ice Spice achieved four top 10 hits on the US Billboard Hot 100—"Boy's a Liar Pt. 2" (with PinkPantheress), "Karma" (with Taylor Swift), and "Princess Diana", and "Barbie World" (with Nicki Minaj).

On January 31, 2024, Ice Spice announced that her-then upcoming debut studio album would arrive somewhere in that same year. The name of the album is a reference to her being born on January 1, 2000. She stated that it was almost finished, and a "crazy collaboration" had been "locked in" two days prior to the interview being conducted.

On June 5, Ice Spice revealed the album cover artwork, along with the release date of July 26. According to Billboard's Michael Saponara, the "NYC-themed cover art [...] finds her rocking revealing jean shorts along with green boots, her hands on a concrete wall as she stands outside a subway station next to a fire hydrant. "Y2K" is spray painted in hot pink on a trash can." On July 12, Ice Spice and Central Cee released "Did It First", described by Uproxx as a half-Jersey club, half-UK drill track that was "100% [Ice Spice's] own" with a distinctive "propulsive" sound.

== Promotion ==
=== Tour ===
On June 5, 2024, along with the album announcement, Ice Spice announced the Y2K! World Tour, with 25 dates across Europe and North America. The tour began with its European leg on July 4 at the Roskilde Festival in Denmark, and it was scheduled to end in Australia on January 5, 2025. The tour was set to be performed in Denmark, Poland, Austria, England, Switzerland, Romania, Belgium, the United States, Canada, Ireland, Scotland, the Netherlands, France, Germany, Sweden, Norway, New Zealand, and Australia.

For shows in the United States and Canada, rappers Cash Cobain and Cleotrapa were the opening acts. For shows in Europe, bktharula was the opening act.

=== Drama with Cleotrapa ===
During the tour, Ice Spice gained controversy on TikTok after her friend, Cleotrapa, alleged that Ice Spice treated her like a slave on tour. In a six-part series of TikToks, Cleotrapa called Ice Spice a "fake friend," and reported she was given a days notice to prepare for the tour, was left to handle her own luggage, book her own room in a five star hotel, was denied food as she "wasn't part of the budget" for the tour, and wasn't given a changing room to prepare for shows and needed to change in gas station bathrooms. Ice Spice responded to the controversy on Twitter, saying, "You got less than 10,000 listeners and I'm sharing my stage with you and you feeling so entitled." The two are no longer friends.

== Commercial performance ==
In the United States, Y2K! debuted at number 18 on the US Billboard 200, with 28,000 album-equivalent units, becoming her highest selling week, surpassing her debut extended play, Like..? (2023), which sold 15,000 units. In Europe, Y2K! entered only in the French, Lithuanian, and Poland albums charts, respectively at the numbers 124, 20 and 43.

== Critical reception ==
Professional ratings
Aggregate scores
| Source | Rating |
|---|---|
| AnyDecentMusic? | 5.8/10 |
| Metacritic | 65/100 |
Review scores
| Source | Rating |
| Clash | 7/10 |
| Evening Standard | 3/5 stars |
| Exclaim! | 6/10 |
| The Guardian | 3/5 stars |
| The Independent | 4/5 stars |
| The Line of Best Fit | 6/10 |
| NME | 3/5 stars |
| Pitchfork | 7.6/10 |
| Rolling Stone | 3.5/5 stars |
| The Telegraph | 3/5 stars |

Upon its release, the album received mixed reviews from critics. According to the review aggregator Metacritic, Y2K! received "generally favorable reviews" based on a weighted average score of 65 out of 100 from 17 critic scores. The review aggregator site AnyDecentMusic? compiled 15 reviews and gave the album an average of 5.8 out of 10.

Alexis Petridis of The Guardian wrote that the album "doesn't hang around long enough to bore you", while describing the record as "wilfully trashy, brief and throwaway". He noted that "Y2K! is unlikely to enter the pantheon of great rap albums", however, "it's fun while it lasts". Writing for The Independent, Helen Brown stated that there's "a wickedly infectious energy, wit and filth to her confrontational braggadocio". NME's Rhian Daly wrote that the album "shows plenty of promise" but is weighed down by the filler content. Daly concluded his review by noting that "it's not a masterpiece that will silence the haters, but it's not likely to slam the brakes on her rapid rise either". Mankaprr Conteh for Rolling Stone wrote that the album's short length "uses her limited range" to her advantage while noting that "Ice is more animated and wordy than ever". Complex noted the abundance of poop-related lyrics, stating, "there is a lot of shit on this album".

== Track listing ==
Y2K! track listing
| No. | Title | Writer(s) | Producer(s) | Length |
|---|---|---|---|---|
| 1. | "Phat Butt" | Isis Gaston; Ephrem Lopez, Jr.; Jamall Willingham; Bernard Leverette; Dengelo Hunt | RiotUSA | 2:09 |
| 2. | "Oh Shhh..." (with Travis Scott) | Gaston; Jacques Webster III; Lopez; Joshua Goldin-McCarthy | RiotUSA; Goldin | 2:41 |
| 3. | "Popa" | Gaston; Lopez; Javier Mercado; Daniel Mohammadi | RiotUSA; Synthetic; Upmadeit | 2:40 |
| 4. | "Bitch I'm Packin'" (with Gunna) | Gaston; Sergio Kitchens; Lopez; Mark Williams; Raul Cubina; Philip Müller | RiotUSA; Ojivolta; DJH | 2:42 |
| 5. | "Plenty Sun" | Gaston; Lopez; Mercado; Mohammadi | RiotUSA; Synthetic; Upmadeit | 2:41 |
| 6. | "Did It First" (with Central Cee) | Gaston; Oakley Caesar-Su; Lopez; Nicolas Baran; Lily Kaplan | RiotUSA; Nico Baran; Kaplan | 1:58 |
| 7. | "BB Belt" | Gaston; Lopez | RiotUSA | 1:56 |
| 8. | "Think U the Shit (Fart)" | Gaston; Lopez; Mercado; Steven Giron | RiotUSA; Synthetic; Venny | 2:21 |
| 9. | "Gimmie a Light" | Gaston; Lopez; Sean Paul Henriques; Troy Rami | RiotUSA | 2:06 |
| 10. | "TTYL" | Gaston; Lopez | RiotUSA | 2:03 |
| Total length: | | | | 23:17 |

Y2K! digital bonus edition track listing
| No. | Title | Writer(s) | Producer(s) | Length |
|---|---|---|---|---|
| 11. | "Gyat" | Gaston; Lopez; Mohamed Camara; Adrian Lau | RiotUSA; MCVertt; A-Lau | 1:54 |
| Total length: | | | | 25:13 |

Y2K! : I'm Just a Girl deluxe edition track listing
| No. | Title | Writer(s) | Producer(s) | Length |
|---|---|---|---|---|
| 12. | "Hannah Montana" (with NLE Choppa and DaBaby) | Gaston; Bryson Potts; Jonathan Kirk; Lopez; Goldin-McCarthy | RiotUSA; Goldin | 2:17 |
| 13. | "So What?" | Gaston; Lopez; Derrick Gray | RiotUSA; Derrick Milano | 2:38 |
| 14. | "BB Belt (Remix)" (featuring BB Trickz) | Gaston; Belize Kali; Lopez | RiotUSA | 2:51 |
| 15. | "Popa (Remix)" (featuring Anuel AA) | Gaston; Emmanuel Gazmey; Lopez; Mercado; Mohammadi | RiotUSA; Synthetic; Upmadeit | 2:40 |
| 16. | "Like" | Gaston; Lopez | RiotUSA | 1:56 |
| Total length: | | | | 37:38 |

== Personnel ==
- Ice Spice – vocals
- Mike Dean – mastering, mixing (tracks 1–3, 5–7, 10)
- Colin Leonard – mastering (tracks 8, 9)
- Sean Solymar – mixing (tracks 1–3, 5–7, 10)
- Dayron "Slayron" Hammond – mixing, engineering (tracks 8, 9)
- RiotUSA – engineering (tracks 2, 8, 9), programming (8)
- Tommy Rush – immersive mix engineering, mixing assistance (tracks 1–7, 10)
- Kaleb "KQuick" Rollins – immersive mix engineering (tracks 8, 9)
- Augusto Sanchez – immersive mix engineering (track 8)

== Charts ==
Chart performance for Y2K!
| Chart (2024) | Peak position |
|---|---|
| Canadian Albums (Billboard) | 54 |
| French Albums (SNEP) | 124 |
| Lithuanian Albums (AGATA) | 20 |
| Nigerian Albums (TurnTable) | 76 |
| Polish Albums (ZPAV) | 43 |
| US Billboard 200 | 18 |
| US Top R&B/Hip-Hop Albums (Billboard) | 3 |
