= Two-Face Bang 2 =

Mixtape by Fredo Bang
- Released: April 15, 2022
- Length: 42:31
- Label: Se Lavi Productions, Def Jam
- Producer: BboyBeatz; BJ Beatz; Buddah Bless; Cxdy; David Soul; DJ Chose; DJ KJ; Einer Bankz; Hardbody B-Eazy; Hoops; Iceberg Beatz; Jahmoni; James Maddocks; Karltin Bankz; LondnBlue; Nash Beats; Patron; Pitt Tha Kid; SamBeats; Skywalker OG; Str8cash; Taz Taylor; Uno Reyes; Yakree; Yo Benji; Yung Lando; Yung Tago

Fredo Bang chronology
Murder Made Me (2021)	Two-Face Bang 2 (2022)

Singles from Two-Face Bang 2
- 1. "Fool for Love" Released: December 22, 2021; 2. "Throw It Back" Released: January 5, 2022; 3. "4's Up" Released: February 18, 2022; 4. "Federal Raid" Released: March 11, 2022; 5. "No Love" Released: March 5, 2022; 6. "Last One Left" Released: April 15, 2022; 7. "Brazy" Released: April 22, 2022

Two-Face Bang 2 is the sixth mixtape by American rapper Fredo Bang. It was released on April 15, 2022, by Se Lavi Productions, Def Jam Recordings. The mixtape features guest appearances from Roddy Ricch, Sleepy Hallow, Money Man, Rob49 and YNW Melly. The mixtape serves as a sequel to Fredo Bang's debut mixtape, 2 Face Bang.

== Background ==
In March 2022, Fredo Bang officially announced the mixtape via his Instagram page, he requested ten thousand comments to release the album. On March 18, 2022, Fredo Bang posted the official artwork for the mixtape while asking his fans who to feature on the mixtape.

Professional ratings
Review scores
Source	Rating
Allmusic	3.5/5 stars

== Track listing ==
No.	Title	Writer(s)	Producer(s)	Length
1.	"Street Lights"	Fredrick Dewon Thomas Givens II; Martin Alexander Pitt; Jackie Plant Jr.; Aaron Tago; Orlando Brossie; Stephan Antoine Reibaldi	Pitt Tha Kid; Patron; Yung Lando; Yung Tago; Hardbody B-Eazy	2:26
2.	"Gianni's Wish"	Givens II		0:33
3.	"Last One Left" (with Roddy Ricch)	Givens II; Rodrick Wayne Moore Jr.; Plant Jr.; Norman Payne	Hardbody B-Eazy; DJ Chose	3:16
4.	"Goin Blind"	Givens II; Kevin Davis Jr.; Thomas Walker	DJ KJ; Skywalker Og	1:55
5.	"Underdog Hero"	Givens II; Isak Gidgard; Brian Lemar Stweart Jr; Henri Velasco	Hoops; Str8cash; BboyBeatz	2:24
6.	"Brazy" (with YNW Melly)	Givens II; Jamell Demons	Yung Lando; Karltin Bankz; LondnBlue; Uno Reyes	2:49
7.	"Hard 4 U"	Givens II; Brossie; Eli Haire; Lukas Payne; Sterling Reynolds	Yung Lando; Karltin Bankz; LondnBlue; Uno Reyes	2:17
8.	"Ivy K/Hair By Tae"	Givens II; Tyron Douglas Sr.	Hardbody B-Eazy	0:34
9.	"Talk To Me"	Givens II; Tyron Douglas Sr.	Buddah Bless	1:37
10.	"4's Up"	Givens II; Brandon Jamal Russell; Stweart Jr; Jahmoni Campbell	Jahmoni; BboyBeatz; BJ Beatz	2:13
11.	"Like That" (featuring Rob49)	Givens II; Robert Thomas; Plant Jr.; Payne	Hardbody B-Eazy; DJ Chose	2:12
12.	"Nobody"	Givens II; Russell; James Maddocks	James Maddocks; BJ Beatz	2:54
13.	"BOP"	Givens II; Stewart Jr.; Jack Richard Thierer	Buddah Bless; Yakree	2:16
14.	"No Love" (featuring Sleepy Hallow)	Givens II; Tegan Joshua Anthony Chambers; Einer Bankz; Dylan James Berg; Samuel Martin Dimits	Einer Bankz; SamBeats; Iceberg Beatz	2:45
15.	"Federal Raid"	Givens II; Tago; Benjamin Ibrahimovic	Yo Benji; Yung Tago	2:28
16.	"Paper"	Givens II; Tago; Plant Jr.	Hardbody B-Eazy; Yung Tago	2:08
17.	"Proud Of Me" (featuring Money Man)	Givens II; Tysen Jay Bolding; Plant Jr.; Payne	DJ Chose; Hardbody B-Eazy	3:08
18.	"Throw It Back"	Givens II; Russell; Stewart Jr.; Davd Dror; Thierer	BboyBeatz; Yakree; BJ Beatz; David Soul	1:54
19.	"Fool For Love"	Givens II; Cody Rounds; Danny Lee Snodgrass, Jr.; Nathan Scott Lmarche	Taz Taylor; Cxdy; Nash Beats	2:30
Total length:				39:37

== Personnel ==
- Jess Jackson – mastering, mixing (13, 15, 16)
- Hardbody B-Eazy – mixing (1, 3, 4–6, 8–14, 16, 19)
- Ice “The Producer” – Audio engineer
- Călin Enache - Assistant Mastering Engineer (3)
- Dylan Jackson - Assistant Mastering Engineer (3)
- David Bone - Assistant Mastering Engineer (1, 3–7, 9–19)

== Charts ==
Chart performance for Two-Face Bang 2
Chart (2022)	Peak position
US Billboard 200	119
