= Did It First =

2024 single by Ice Spice and Central Cee

Single by Ice Spice and Central Cee

from the album Y2K!
- Released: July 11, 2024
- Recorded: March 2024
- Genre: Jersey club; drill
- Length: 1:58
- Label: 10K Projects; Capitol
- Songwriters: Isis Gaston; Ephrem Lopez Jr.; Lily Kaplan; Nicholas Baran; Oakley Caesar-Su
- Producers: RiotUSA; Kaplan; Baran

Ice Spice singles chronology
"Phat Butt" (2024)	"Did It First" (2024)	"Oh Shhh..." (2024)

Central Cee singles chronology
"Wave" (2024)	"Did It First" (2024)	"Gen Z Luv" (2024)

Music video
- "Did It First" on YouTube

"Did It First" is a song by American rapper Ice Spice and British rapper Central Cee, released on July 11, 2024, as the fourth single from the former's debut studio album Y2K!. It was produced by RiotUSA, Lily Kaplan and Nico Baran. It is a Jersey club song that has strong drill elements.

== Background ==
The rappers teased the song in the week before it was released, with Ice Spice posting a clip of her twerking against a fireworks backdrop. It led to the song going viral on the video-sharing app TikTok, in which it amassed over 42 million views and was used in over 10,500 videos prior to being released.

== Composition and lyrics ==
The production contains a drill and Jersey club-inspired beat with a propulsive rhythm, stuttering drums and looping vocal sample. Ice Spice raps about retaliating against an ex-partner for cheating on her by doing the same to them; she declares in the chorus, "If he's cheatin', I'm doin' him worse / No Uno, I hit the reverse / I ain't trippin', the grip in my purse / I don't care 'cause he did it first". Central Cee raps from the man's perspective in his verse, in which he details attempting to conceal his infidelity but admitting that "If I went court for all the times I got caught / I'd have about 16 felons" and "I clearly ain't learn my lesson".

== Critical reception ==
Elias Andrews of HotNewHipHop wrote, "'Did It First' sounds like a pop-ified version of aughts hyperdub. It sounds pretentious to describe on these terms, sure, but there's something undeniably retro about the song that plays to its benefit. Yes, Ice Spice is using the Ice Spice flow, and unsurprisingly, it sounds good. She's trash talking her haters, and describing the ways in which she's going to disrespect them. Spice then passes the mantle off to Central Cee, who manages to ride the beat in a complimentary yet distinct manner. Cee is blowing up stateside, so linking up with him was a cagey decision. That's not to say the results are fun. These two have chemistry, as evidenced by Y2K-drenched music video."

== Music video ==
An official music video was directed by Edgar Esteves and Nikita Vilchinski and premiered alongside the single. It shows Spice dancing in front of a corner store and twerking while lying on her pillow-filled bed, as well as scenes of her and Central Cee at a house party in the latter's hometown of London and a 2000s-era desktop computer with message windows. The two also lay together in the bed. The visual features an appearance of Sol de Janeiro's Cheirosa 68 Perfume Mist.

== Track listing ==
- Streaming/digital download
1. "Did It First" (explicit) – 1:58
2. "Did It First" (sped up) – 1:48
3. "Did It First" (slowed down) – 2:12
4. "Did It First" (instrumental) – 1:58
5. "Did It First" (acapella) – 1:58
6. "Did It First" (clean) – 1:58

== Charts ==
=== Weekly charts ===
Weekly chart performance for "Did It First"
Chart (2024)	Peak position
Australia (ARIA)	22
Australia Hip Hop/R&B (ARIA)	4
Austria (Ö3 Austria Top 40)	54
Canada Hot 100 (Billboard)	37
Czech Republic Singles Digital (ČNS IFPI)	77
France (SNEP)	169
Germany (GfK)	87
Global 200 (Billboard)	30
Ireland (IRMA)	20
Lithuania (AGATA)	18
Netherlands (Single Top 100)	75
New Zealand (Recorded Music NZ)	16
Poland (Polish Streaming Top 100)	52
Slovakia Singles Digital (ČNS IFPI)	55
Sweden Heatseeker (Sverigetopplistan)	20
Switzerland (Schweizer Hitparade)	43
UK Singles (Official Charts)	15
UK Hip Hop/R&B (Official Charts)	5
US Billboard Hot 100	51
US Hot R&B/Hip-Hop Songs (Billboard)	10
US Rhythmic Airplay (Billboard)	30

=== Year-end charts ===
2024 year-end chart performance for "Did It First"
Chart (2024)	Position
US Hot R&B/Hip-Hop Songs (Billboard)	88

== Certifications ==
Certifications for "Did It First"
Region	Certification	Certified units/sales
Brazil (Pro-Música Brasil)	Platinum	40,000^{‡}
New Zealand (RMNZ)	Gold	15,000^{‡}
Poland (ZPAV)	Gold	25,000^{‡}
United Kingdom (BPI)	Silver	200,000^{‡}
^{‡} Sales+streaming figures based on certification alone.
