= Maddox Batson =

American singer and songwriter

- Born: William Maddox Batson; December 13, 2009 (age 16); Nashville, Tennessee, U.S.
- Genres: Country; pop
- Occupations: Singer; songwriter
- Instruments: Vocals; guitar; piano; mandolin
- Years active: 2024–present
- Labels: Prosper; Warner
- Website: maddoxbatson.com

Maddox Batson (born December 13, 2009) is an American singer and songwriter. His debut single "Tears in the River" entered the top-twenty on Spotify's US Viral 50 chart and the song had approximately twelve million global streams by the end of 2024. As of April 2025, he has released an EP and seven singles.

== Early life ==
William Maddox Batson was born in Hermitage, Tennessee, and later moved to Birmingham, Alabama. In the summer of 2022, he was diagnosed with Osgood-Schlatter disease, which hindered his ability to play sports. Due to this, he began playing music with his father and posting many clips on TikTok. One clip, a cover of "Dancing in the Sky" by Sam Barber posted in September 2023, went viral and garnered more than 1 million views. Maddox was discovered by record executives and managers: Eddie Franzoni and Nick Barr. He then began performing at his first concerts in 2023. As his career took off, he started homeschooling.

== Career ==
In early 2024, Batson released his debut single: "Tears in the River", which entered the top-twenty on Spotify's US Viral 50 chart. The song had approximately twelve million global streams by the end of 2024. "I Wanna Know", was released in April 2024 and reached number 19 on YouTube's Trending page. "X's" was released in September 2024, and has over 16 million global streams, being his most popular song to date.

Batson is one of the youngest artists to sign with Warner Records in partnership with Prosper Entertainment. Following his record deal, he embarked on a sold-out headlining tour across the United States. In 2024, he performed at CMA Fest and became the youngest artist to perform Whiskey Jam, filling the venue. He co-wrote the song "Tough" for Lana Del Rey and Quavo, inspired by his late grandfather and father—the song charted within the top forty of the US Billboard Hot 100.

In February 2025, Batson released the single "I Don't Like You Anymore", the result of a two-hour songwriting session with Ashley Gorley. In March of the same year, he released his first E.P. entitled First Dance. On March 26, 2025, Batson made his debut performance at the Grand Ole Opry. Following a headlining tour in the spring of 2025, he is expected to open for Lainey Wilson during her Whirlwind World Tour. Batson's opening dates are currently slated to begin in September 2025.

The spring of 2025 saw the release of a music video for the song "Girl in Green".

== Artistry ==
Batson claims eclectic music tastes but specifically cites: Morgan Wallen, George Strait, Michael Bublé, Garth Brooks, Playboi Carti and Frank Sinatra as his influences.

== Discography ==
=== Singles ===
List of singles, with year released and album name
Title	Year	Album
"Tears in the River"	2024	Non-album single
"I Wanna Know"	2024	Non-album single
"X's"	2024	First Dance
"Southbound"	2024	First Dance
"Southbound (Acoustic)"	2024	Non-album single
"I Don't Like You Anymore"	2025	First Dance
"Girl in Green"	2025	First Dance
"God Talkin'"	2025	First Dance
"Problem"	2025	First Dance
"It Was You"	2025	First Dance
"Somewhere South"	2025	First Dance (The After Party)
"I Need a Truck"	2025	First Dance (The After Party)
2 Feet	2025	First Dance (The After Party)
"No More"	2025	Non-album single
"Coincidence"	2025	Non-album single
"Last Christmas" / "I'll Be Home For Christmas	2025	Home For the Holidays
"Any Other Night"	2026	Non-album single
"If I See Her Again"	2026	Non-album single
"Fallin' Easy"	2026	Non-album single

=== Extended plays ===
List of extended plays, with selected details
Title	EP details
First Dance	Release date: March 21, 2025; Label: Prosper, Warner; Formats: CD, digital download
