= Think U the Shit (Fart) =

Single by Ice Spice

from the album Y2K!
- Released: January 26, 2024
- Genre: Dance-rap
- Length: 2:22
- Label: 10K Projects; Capitol
- Composers: Ephrem Lopez; Javier Mercado; Steven Giron
- Lyricist: Isis Gaston
- Producers: RiotUSA; Synthetic; Venny

Ice Spice singles chronology
"Pretty Girl" (2023)	"Think U the Shit (Fart)" (2024)	"Fisherrr" (Remix) (2024)

Music Video
- "Think U the Shit (Fart)" on YouTube

"Think U the Shit (Fart)" is a song by the American rapper Ice Spice. It was released on January 26, 2024, through 10K Projects and Capitol Records, as the lead single from her debut studio album, Y2K!. The song was produced and co-written by RiotUSA, Synthetic, and Venny. Variety included it in their Worst Songs of 2024 list.

== Background and release ==
On January 7, 2024, Ice Spice took to social media to preview the song. Just a week later, Ice Spice was seen recording a music video to the track. Before the release of the track, it gained large success online and on TikTok. Ice Spice officially announced the single the day before its release on January 26. The song impacted pop, rhythmic, and urban radio in the US on January 30.

== Lyrics ==
In "Think U the Shit (Fart)", Ice Spice uses a play on words to reduce someone with a big ego (slang term: the shit) to being less than a fart.

Ice Spice revealed through an appearance on Twitter Spaces that the song was targeted at the rapper Latto, who posted a small clip of her then-unreleased song "Sunday Service" with the music video for Ice Spice's song "Pretty Girl" being slightly visible on the TV in the background. Latto denied that she purposely put the music video back there in several interviews. However, regarding her reaction, Ice Spice stated:

"Seeing that I'm in the back of your weak ass snippet? I was like, 'Wait a second, that's me?' So I'm like, 'Since we're talking about me, let's talk about me.' It was really just a snippet. I was like, 'This has to be fake. This is AI.' But bitches be bold, so I was like, 'Oh, we're being bold today."

== Music video ==
The George Buford and Frederick Buford-directed music video was filmed in Miami on January 13, 2024, and was released alongside the track. In the video, Ice Spice "is seen twerking and partying around the city, holding stacks of cash in high-end cars and vibing with her friends on boats".

== Commercial performance ==
"Think U the Shit (Fart)" debuted at number 37 on the Billboard Hot 100, becoming her highest charting solo single. In other charts, it debuted at number 78 on the Billboard Global 200.

== Charts ==
=== Weekly charts ===
Weekly chart performance
Chart (2024)	Peak position
Australia (ARIA)	89
Australia Hip Hop/R&B (ARIA)	17
Canada Hot 100 (Billboard)	41
Global 200 (Billboard)	78
Greece International (IFPI)	87
New Zealand Hot Singles (RMNZ)	6
UK Singles (Official Charts)	75
US Billboard Hot 100	37
US Hot R&B/Hip-Hop Songs (Billboard)	14
US Pop Airplay (Billboard)	39
US Rhythmic Airplay (Billboard)	18

=== Year-end charts ===
2024 year-end chart performance
Chart (2024)	Position
US Hot R&B/Hip-Hop Songs (Billboard)	87

== Release history ==
Release dates and formats
Region	Date	Format	Version	Label	Ref.
Various	January 26, 2024	Digital download; streaming	Original	10K Projects; Capitol	
Italy	January 26, 2024	Radio airplay	Original	Universal	
Various	January 29, 2024	Digital download; streaming	Sped up; slowed	10K Projects; Capitol	
United States	January 30, 2024	Contemporary hit radio; rhythmic contemporary radio; urban contemporary radio	Original	10K Projects; Capitol	

== See also ==
- Potty humor
