= Bandit (Don Toliver song) =

Single by Don Toliver

from the album Hardstone Psycho
- Released: February 1, 2024
- Recorded: 2023
- Genre: Rap rock; trap
- Length: 2:27
- Label: Cactus Jack; Atlantic
- Songwriters: Caleb Toliver; Kevin Parker; Sean Reid
- Producer: ReidMD

Don Toliver singles chronology
"Worth It" (2023)	"Bandit" (2024)	"Deep in the Water" (2024)

Music video
- "Bandit" on YouTube

"Bandit" is a song by American rapper and singer Don Toliver. It was released through Cactus Jack and Atlantic Records as the lead single from his fourth studio album, Hardstone Psycho, on February 1, 2024. Toliver wrote the song with producer ReidMD, with Australian musician Kevin Parker also being credited as a songwriter due to the song "One More Hour" by his music project Tame Impala being sampled. Writing for Stereogum, Tom Breihan felt that the song "works pretty well as source material for the kind of hazy, expansive rap beat that Toliver's label boss Travis Scott would probably love". At the APRA Music Awards of 2025, the song was nominated for Most Performed Hip Hop / Rap Work.

== Music video ==
The official music video for "Bandit" was released alongside the song on February 1, 2024. In the video, Toliver leads a gang of bikers through a desert and the group then spends time with women at a party. Toliver's girlfriend, Colombian-American singer Kali Uchis, makes an appearance at the end of the video and shows her baby bump as she was pregnant with their first child, a son, at the time of its release, while a snippet of his next single from Hardstone Psycho, "Deep in the Water", played.

== Charts ==
=== Weekly charts ===
Weekly chart performance for "Bandit"
Chart (2024)	Peak position
Australia Hip Hop/R&B (ARIA)	26
Canada Hot 100 (Billboard)	42
Global 200 (Billboard)	61
Ireland (IRMA)	89
New Zealand Hot Singles (RMNZ)	13
Switzerland (Schweizer Hitparade)	80
UK Singles (OCC)	63
UK Hip Hop/R&B (OCC)	34
US Billboard Hot 100	38
US Hot R&B/Hip-Hop Songs (Billboard)	13
US Rhythmic Airplay (Billboard)	9

=== Year-end charts ===
2024 year-end chart performance for "Bandit"
Chart (2024)	Position
US Hot R&B/Hip-Hop Songs (Billboard)	42

== Certifications ==
Certifications for "Bandit"
Region	Certification	Certified units/sales
Canada (Music Canada)	2× Platinum	160,000^{‡}
New Zealand (RMNZ)	Gold	15,000^{‡}
United Kingdom (BPI)	Silver	200,000^{‡}
United States (RIAA)	Platinum	1,000,000^{‡}
^{‡} Sales+streaming figures based on certification alone.
