= Phat Butt =

2024 song by Ice Spice

Single by Ice Spice

from the album Y2K!
- Released: June 21, 2024
- Genre: Hip hop; drill
- Length: 2:09
- Label: 10K Projects; Capitol
- Songwriters: Isis Gaston; Ephrem Lopez Jr.; Bernard Leverette; DeAngelo Hunt; Jamall Willingham
- Producer: RiotUSA

Ice Spice singles chronology
"Gimmie a Light" (2024)	"Phat Butt" (2024)	"Did It First" (2024)

Music video
- "Phat Butt" on YouTube

"Phat Butt" is a song by American rapper Ice Spice, released on June 21, 2024, as the third single from her debut studio album, Y2K!. It was produced by RiotUSA.

== Background ==
Ice Spice teased the song through a snippet on social media on June 17, 2024. Fans drew comparisons between her and Nicki Minaj with respect to musical style and her clothing in the clip.

== Composition and lyrics ==
Ice Spice opens the song with a reference to "Beez in the Trap" by Nicki Minaj in the intro. Over a "bone-rattling", "video gamey" beat with "ferocious" percussion, she boasts her fame, success and physique, calling herself a "rap bitch on a pop chart". Spice takes aim at other female rappers (especially Latto) for copying her photography and music style on the bridge and pays homage to Nicki Minaj through references in the second verse. She also alludes to the cover art of Y2K!, particularly the placement of the title on a trash can.

== Music video ==
The music video was directed by Ice Spice herself and released alongside the single. It sees her dancing, twerking, lip-syncing and posing in front of garage door that is painted with graffiti of a bikini-clad posterior. She rocks an orange-yellow bob cut, designer clothing and jewelry. The clip also uses VHS filter.

== Charts ==
Chart performance for "Phat Butt"
Chart (2024)	Peak position
New Zealand Hot Singles (RMNZ)	39
