= Remy Bond =

American singer-songwriter (born 2004)

Marina Remy Bond
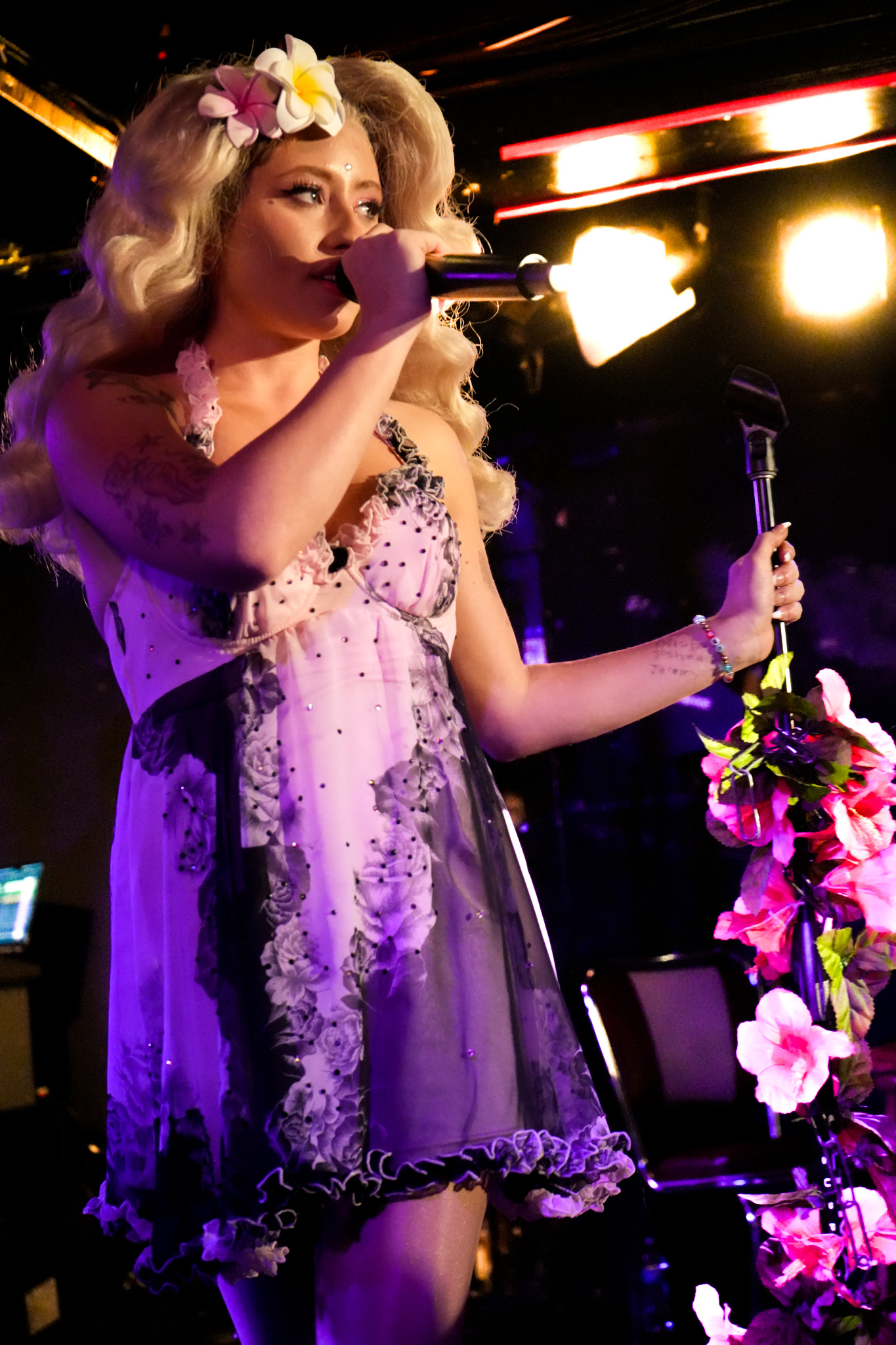
- Bond performing in Chicago in 2025

Background information
- Also known as: Remy Bond
- Born: Marina Remy Bond; March 27, 2004 (age 22); New York City, US
- Genres: Pop music
- Years active: 2023–present
- Label: Warner Records
- Website: www.remybond.com

Marina Remy Bond (born March 27, 2004) is an American singer and songwriter known for retro-style original music. Her breakout single "Summer Song" went viral on TikTok in 2024. She is signed to Warner Records.

== Early life ==
Bond grew up in New York City. She was first seen by the public in the sixth season of Master Chef Junior.

== Music career ==
In August of 2023, she released her first single, "End of the World", and followed it up with her second single, "Benzo Queen", in October.

The pair was followed up with the single "Summer Song", which went viral on TikTok and amassed more than 23 million streams. when hundreds of thousands of the site's users posted their own videos using the song. The song peaked at No. 2 on Spotify's Viral 50 USA chart and then No. 1 on its Fresh Finds Class of 2024. The song gained further recognition when Elton John featured it on his "Rocket Hour" playlist.

She made her live debut at a sold-out show at The Roxy Theatre in Los Angeles in 2024. She would then release her long awaited singles "Don't Go Back to Paris" and "Star Shaped Baby" in the following months.

In February 2025 Bond signed with Warner Records. Her first release on the label was the single "Simple Girl". She also signed a publishing deal with Sony/ATV Publishing.

In June, she began her first concert tour, The Star Shaped Baby Tour. The tour included performances at the El Rey Theatre in Los Angeles, Lollapalooza in Berlin, and EartH in London.

In November 2025, Bond released her debut EP, Backstage at the Tropicana, with songs that harked back to the 1950s to '80s. A few weeks later she released the music video for her song "Skin Tight Jeans", which was directed by her sister, Olivia Bond.

Bond's next single, "Cherry Red Balloon", was released on February 20, 2026. The song is a psychedelic pop song produced by John Ryan.

== Recognition ==
In February 2025, InStyle included Bond in its list of 2025 Musicians to Watch, describing her as "known for her sultry vocals, pin-up style, and nostalgic lyrics plucked straight from Hollywood's Golden Age".

In April Who What Wear featured her as a notable new artist of the year, describing her as having "a voice fit for the silver screen era" and with "a pop aesthetic all her own". In May 2025 Billboard included her in its annual "21 Under 21" list. The next month Rolling Stone named Bond an "Artist You Need to Know". She was also included on Amazon's "Indie Artists to Watch" list and Zane Lowe's 25 for '25.

== Awards and nominations ==
=== Berlin Music Video Awards ===
The Berlin Music Video Awards is an international festival that promotes the art of music videos.

Year	Nominated work	Award	Result	Ref.
2026	"Skin Tight Jeans"	Best Art Direction	Nominated	
