= Deep in the Water =

Single by Don Toliver

from the album Hardstone Psycho
- Released: March 14, 2024
- Genre: R&B
- Length: 2:50
- Label: Cactus Jack; Atlantic; We Run It
- Songwriters: Caleb Toliver; Josiah Sherman; Cole Wainwright; Jackson Speets; Duprie Monroe; Derek Anderson; John Mitchell; Peter O'Grady; Léa Fourlin
- Producers: Buddy Ross; OhRoss; IWantDior; Broadday; 206Derek

Don Toliver singles chronology
"Bandit" (2024)	"Deep in the Water" (2024)	"Heavy Stunts" (2024)

Music video
- "Deep in the Water" on YouTube

"Deep in the Water" is a song by American rapper and singer Don Toliver. It was released through Cactus Jack Records, We Run It Inc and Atlantic Records as the second single from his fourth studio album, Hardstone Psycho, on March 14, 2024. The song was mainly produced by Buddy Ross, OhRoss, IWantDior, Broadday, and 206Derek and additionally produced by Strae1k and 1Tenesoh, and Toliver wrote it with the main producers alongside John Mitchell; Joy Orbison and Léa Fourlin are also credited as songwriters as the song contains samples from the former's 2021 song, "Better", which features the latter. "Deep in the Water" is an R&B song that sees Toliver talk about his love for his girlfriend, Colombian-American singer Kali Uchis, and their then-newborn son, as he sings in the chorus: "Deep in the water, far as I can see / Deep in the water, it's just you and me / Deep in the water, far as I can see / Deep in the water, through your pregnancy".

== Music video ==
The official music video for "Deep in the Water" was released alongside the song on March 14, 2024. A snippet of the song first appeared at the end in the video for Toliver's previous single, "Bandit", which was released on February 1, 2024. The video for "Deep in the Water" sees him riding a motorcycle and then sitting under a white spotlight in a desert in the middle of the night as he wears a jacket that was custom-made by Elliott Evan that has the name of its parent album as a logo, as he picks back up where the video for "Bandit" left off. It also sees Toliver and Kali Uchis cradling their son in a blue-colored room.

== Charts ==
Chart performance for "Deep in the Water"
Chart (2024)	Peak position
New Zealand Hot Singles (RMNZ)	11
US Bubbling Under Hot 100 (Billboard)	6
US Hot R&B/Hip-Hop Songs (Billboard)	35
