= Rob49 =

American rapper (born 1999)

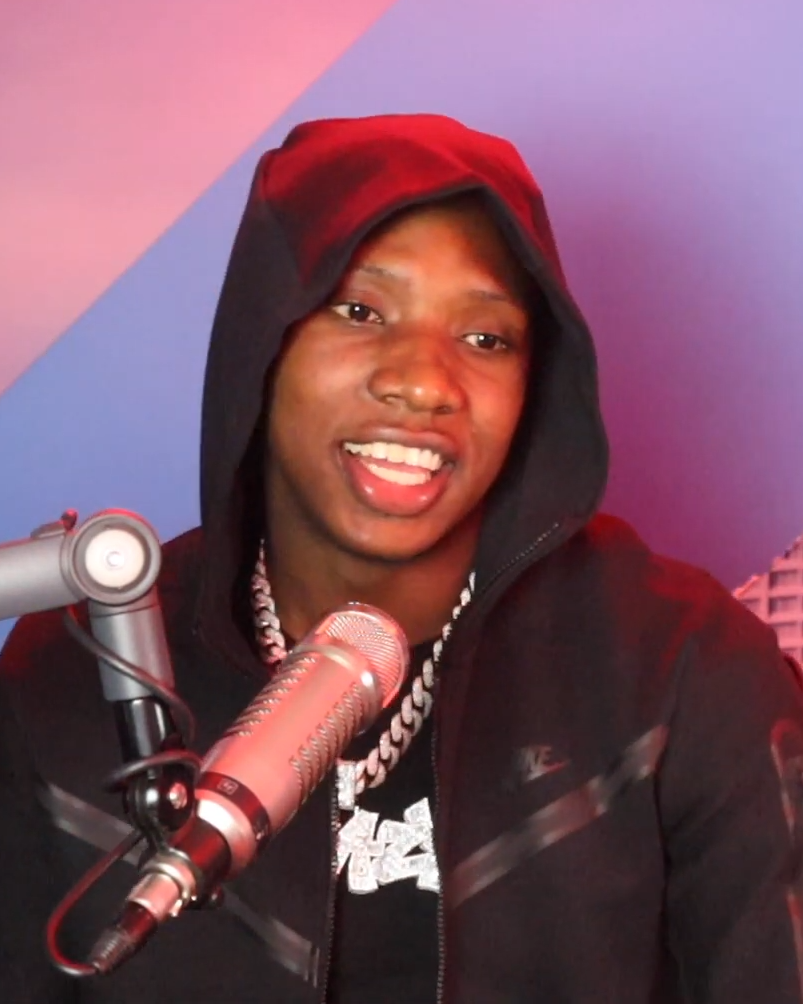
- Rob49 in 2023

Background information
- Born: Robert Coleman Thomas; 1998 or 1999 (age 27–28); New Orleans, Louisiana, U.S
- Genre: Southern hip-hop
- Occupation: Rapper
- Years active: 2020–present
- Labels: Desire; Rebel; Geffen

Robert Coleman Thomas (born 1998 or 1999), known professionally as Rob49, is an American rapper from New Orleans, Louisiana. He is best known for his guest appearance alongside 21 Savage on Travis Scott's 2023 song "Topia Twins", which peaked within the top 20 of the Billboard Hot 100, and his 2025 viral single "WTHelly", which peaked at number 16 on the Billboard Bubbling Under Hot 100 and number 30 on the Hot R&B/Hip-Hop Songs chart.

== Early life ==
Robert Thomas was born in 1998 or 1999. He grew up in the Iberville Projects and spent most of his childhood in the 4th and 9th wards of New Orleans. He was primarily raised by his mother, as his father was incarcerated for much of his childhood. During Hurricane Katrina, his family fled New Orleans and briefly lived in Baton Rouge and Houston before returning to New Orleans. He joined the National Guard after graduating from high school to get into college. He attended Southern University to study nursing for two semesters, before dropping out and pursuing music.

== Career ==
Thomas began his music career in 2020, after dropping out of Southern University. He chose the stage name "Rob49" because he grew up in New Orleans' 4th and 9th wards.

On March 11, 2020, he dropped his debut mixtape, 4our the World. On May 2, 2020, he dropped his second mixtape, Vulture. On July 24, 2020, he released his third mixtape, Krazy Man.

On June 11, 2021, he released his fourth mixtape, 4God. On June 25, 2021, he was featured on Curren$y's "Hit A Lick" alongside Fendi P on the album Welcome To Jet Life Recordings 2.

On March 18, 2022, he was featured on Tafia's "No Cappin" on his album Mention My Name. On April 8, 2022, he released his fifth mixtape, Welcome to Vulture Island, featuring guest appearances from Birdman, Lil Baby, Landstrip Chip, Lil Double 0, Doe Boy, Icewear Vezzo, and Babyface Ray. On April 15, 2022, he was featured on the song "Like That" on Fredo Bang's mixtape Two-Face Bang 2. He was featured on 26AR's "Hottest In My City", which released on May 27, 2022. On June 3, 2022, he was released the single "Hustler's Anthem V2" featuring Kevin Gates and Birdman. On August 12, 2022, he released the single "Yes, You Did" featuring Real Boston Richey. On October 7, 2022, he was featured on Lebra Jolie's "Give U Some" on her self-titled debut EP. On October 28, 2022, he released the single "Add It Up" featuring G Herbo. He was featured on the single "2 Million Up" by Peezy alongside Jeezy and Real Boston Richey, released on November 18, 2022. The single was nominated for Video of the Year at the BET Awards 2023. On November 25, 2022, he was featured on Curren$y's "Low" on his album The Drive in Theatre Part 2. On December 16, 2022, he was featured on NoCap's "How It's Going" on his mixtape The Main Bird. On December 23, 2022, he was featured on the single "Tired" by Sexyy Red.

He was featured on the song "Igloo", on French Montana and DJ Drama's album Coke Boys 6, which released on January 6, 2023. He joined Future's 2023 One Big Party Tour as an opener. Trippie Redd's Mansion Musik, which released on January 20, 2023, featured Thomas on the song "Armageddon". On January 27, 2023, he was featured on the single "Line Em Up" by Huncho Bookie. He was featured on the song "Same Side" on Lil Durk's album Almost Healed, which released on May 26, 2023. On June 9, 2023, he released his sixth album, 4God II, featuring guest appearances from Birdman, Roddy Ricch, YTB Fatt, Icewear Vezzo, G Herbo, DaBaby, Trippie Redd, and NoCap. In June 2023, he was announced as a member of the 2023 XXL Freshmen Class. On July 28, 2023, he was featured on Travis Scott's studio album Utopia, on the 11th track "Topia Twins", alongside 21 Savage. On August 11, 2023, he released the deluxe version of 4God GOD II, featuring additional guest features from Skilla Baby, Tay B, and Lil Durk. On August 18, 2023, he was featured on Lil Zay Osama's album 4 The Trenches on the single "Better Run Better Duck".

In January 2024, he released the single "Wassam Baby" with Lil Wayne. He was featured on the track "One of Them Ones" alongside Quavo in Mustard's July 2024 album Faith of a Mustard Seed.

In March 2025, he released "WTHelly" as a single, which quickly went viral on social media. He is set to embark on his debut headlining tour, the "Let Me Fly Tour" in the fall of 2025.

== Personal life ==
On January 5, 2023, Thomas was injured in Miami, alongside 9 other people, in a mass shooting at a video shoot for the French Montana song "Igloo".

== Discography ==
=== Studio album ===
Title	Details	Peak chart positions
Title	Details	US
Let Me Fly	Released: May 23, 2025; Label: Geffen, Rebel; Format: digital download, streaming	180

=== Mixtapes ===
Title	Details
4our the World	Released: March 11, 2020; Label: Desire Records; Format: digital download, streaming
Vulture	Released: May 2, 2020; Label: Desire; Format: digital download, streaming
Krazy Man	Released: July 24, 2020; Label: Desire; Format: digital download, streaming
4God	Released: June 11, 2021; Label: Geffen, Rebel; Format: digital download, streaming
Welcome to Vulture Island	Released: April 8, 2022; Label: Geffen, Rebel; Format: digital download, streaming
4God II	Released: June 9, 2023; Label: Geffen, Rebel; Format: digital download, streaming

=== Singles ===
List of singles, showing year released and album name
Title	Year	Peak chart positions		Certifications	Album
Title	Year	US Bub.	US R&B/HH	Certifications	Album
"Free K Freestyle"	2020	—	—		Non-album singles
"First 48"	2020	—	—		Non-album singles
"3 Peat" (with Neno Calvin and C4 Trill)	2020	—	—		Non-album singles
"Deeday"	2021	—	—		4God
"New Wave"	2021	—	—		4God
"Next Level"	2021	—	—		4God
"Pent House (Remix)" (with Babyface Ray)	2021	—	—		Welcome to Vulture Island
"Hustler"	2021	—	—		Non-album singles
"Love Triangle"	2021	—	—		Non-album singles
"Vulture Island"	2021	—	—		Welcome to Vulture Island
"Counterfeit" (with Icewear Vezzo)	2022	—	—		Welcome to Vulture Island
"Krazyman"	2022	—	—		Welcome to Vulture Island
"I'm in Her" (with Doe Boy)	2022	—	—		Welcome to Vulture Island
"Vulture Island V2" (with Lil Baby)	2022	—	—	RIAA: Gold	Welcome to Vulture Island
"Hustler's Anthem V2" (with Birdman and Kevin Gates)	2022	—	—		Non-album singles
"Houston Girls"	2022	—	—		Non-album singles
"Yes, You Did" (with Real Boston Richey or G Herbo)	2022	—	—		Non-album singles
"Product of the Trenches"	2022	—	—		Non-album singles
"4God II"	2023	—	—		4God II
"Ball n Chill"	2023	—	—		Non-album singles
"Let Me Know" (with Peezy)	2023	—	—		Non-album singles
"Hate It or Love It" (with DaBaby)	2023	—	—		4God II
"Pill Head"	2023	—	—		4God II
"Mama" (with Skilla Baby and Tay B)	2023	—	—	RIAA: Gold	4God II
"Wassam Baby" (with Lil Wayne)	2024	12	47		Let Me Fly
"On Dat Money" (featuring Cardi B)	2024	—	47		Let Me Fly
"Bussin" (with Moneybagg Yo)	2024	—	44	RIAA: Gold	Let Me Fly
"WTHelly"	2025	16	30		Non-album single
"—" denotes a title that did not chart, or was not released in that territory.

=== Other charted songs ===
List of charted songs, with selected chart positions, showing year released and album name
Title	Year	Peak chart positions										Certifications	Album
Title	Year	US	US R&B /HH	US Rap	AUS	CAN	FRA	NZ	SWE Heat.	UK Stream.	WW	Certifications	Album
"Same Side" (Lil Durk featuring Rob49)	2023	— (Note: "Same Side" did not enter the Billboard Hot 100, but peaked at number one on the Bubbling Under Hot 100 chart.)	40	—	—	—	—	—	—	—	—		Almost Healed
"Topia Twins" (Travis Scott featuring Rob49 and 21 Savage)	2023	17	10	9	29	17	60	17	2	59	17	RIAA: Platinum; MC: Platinum	Utopia
"I Need Us" (with Loe Shimmy)	2025	—	46	—	—	—	—	—	—	—	—		Let Me Fly
"—" denotes a title that did not chart, or was not released in that territory.

=== Guest appearances ===
List of guest appearances, showing song title, year released, other artists and album name
Title	Year	Artist(s)	Album
"4our to 3re"	2020	T-5	Section 8 to Salt Lake
"Spazz"	2020	La Frank5	We All We Got
"Lived Backwards"	2020	Neno Calvin	Expecting Karma
"504"	2020	Baleeve	Non-album singles
"Legit"	2020	KaySL	Non-album singles
"Damage"	2021	Subtweet Shawn	Non-album singles
"Zombie"	2021	TNL Bachi	Non-album singles
"Oxy"	2021	Prettyboi Pierre	GlowStar
"Foreign Whips"	2021	DJ Chose, Lango	Wikk Tapes (Deluxe)
"Make It Shake"	2021	Stone Cold Jzzle	Jzzleworld
"Za Za"	2021	NasGotNext	Whats the Chances
"Hit a Lick"	2021	Curren$y, Fendi P	Welcome to Jet Life Recordings 2
"On Da Floor"	2022	Shoebox Baby	Non-album singles
"How Life Went"	2022	Lah Tezzo3, Neno Calvin	Non-album singles
"Blick Em Off"	2022	JP Martin	Non-album singles
"Vulture Heart"	2022	Crazii da Don, Tesie Brown	Non-album singles
"Glory"	2022	Operation Dream Team, Jay Jones	Jones
"Fuk for Free"	2022	BC TayG	S4TW
"Like That"	2022	Fredo Bang	Two-Face Bang 2
"No Cappin"	2022	Tafia	Mention My Name
"Purple Flags V2"	2022	Calvary Kylan	Who Would've Thought
"Hottest in My City"	2022	26ar	Flyest Oota
"Vacant"	2022	Shift One	First Gear
"First Round"	2022	BLKMigo	V-Boy
"Blood Boy"	2022	Anti da Menace	Non-album singles
"Bussin'"	2022	OG Muchee	Non-album singles
"Trip"	2022	Rasta Leo	Non-album singles
"365"	2022	Ren Gettz	Non-album singles
"2 Million Up"	2022	Peezy, Jeezy	Non-album singles
"Tired"	2022	Sexyy Red	Non-album singles
"No Name"	2022	Souljarilla	Non-album singles
"Shot Back"	2022	Young Deion	Non-album singles
"Come Here"	2022	OGPurpin	Non-album singles
"Out My Zone"	2022	Lil PJ	Non-album singles
"Turn Me Up"	2022	Zac Savage	Deeper Than Music 2
"Give U Some"	2022	Lebra Jolie	Lebra Jolie
"Robbie Anderson"	2022	FCG Heem	Shallowside Baby
"Low"	2022	Curren$y	The Drive in Theatre Part 2
"How's It Going"	2022	NoCap	The Main Bird
"Flood It"	2022	Stone Cold Jzzle	Troubled
"Menace II Society"	2022	Yungeen Ace	Survivor of the Trenches
"Igloo"	2023	French Montana, DJ Drama	Coke Boys 6
"Rich Off Selling Dope"	2023	Woodboy Gee	Bowl Man
"Armageddon"	2023	Trippie Redd	Mansion Musik
"Line 'Em Up"	2023	Huncho Bookie	Non-album singles
"Sugar Daddy"	2023	Vicky Vuittan	Non-album singles
"Again"	2023	Fendi P, Cheeze Beatz	LS3
"Same Side"	2023	Lil Durk	Almost Healed
"Paid"	2023	FL Dusa	Fame Can't Change Me
"Turnt Up"	2023	MgTopYungan	All Eyes on Top
"Bet I Whip It"	2023	YTB Fatt	Non-album single
"Topia Twins"	2023	Travis Scott, 21 Savage	Utopia
"7.2"	2023	Sett	Life of a SlimeCrook
"Primetime"	2023	Ray-Ray McCloud, Jay Rock, Melvin Ingram, J300	Madden NFL 24: Crowd Control
"No Problems"	2023	Lebra Jolie, Melvin Ingram, Darren Waller, Terron Armstead, Derrick Milano	Madden NFL 24: Crowd Control
"6.2 Music"	2023	MudBaby Ru	Non-album singles
"Freaknik"	2024	Baby Jungle	Non-album singles
"One of Them Ones"	2024	Mustard, Quavo	Faith of a Mustard Seed
"More Than a Night"	2025	DDG, Queen Naija, Shenseea	Blame the Chat
"ØWAYSL"	2026	YSL Records, Young Thug, Tezzus, Sk8star	Slime Language 3
