= Kenzo B =

American rapper

- Born: Te'arah Gaines; March 4, 2004 (age 22); Connecticut, U.S.
- Origin: The Bronx
- Genres: Bronx drill; drill; freestyle rap
- Occupations: Rapper; songwriter
- Years active: 2021–present
- Labels: Defiant , Warner Records (former)

Te'arah Gaines, better known by her stage name Kenzo B, is an American rapper. Originating from The Bronx, she has been called the "Queen of Bronx drill". She has released numerous singles and two EPs, Top Dawg in 2022 and Top 2, Not 2 in 2023. She is signed to Defiant & Warner Records.

== Early life ==
Te'arah Gaines was born on March 4, 2004, in Connecticut, where her mother was serving an 11-year prison sentence. She was raised in The Bronx and lived in the River Park Towers. Her brother Bando is also a rapper. She began rapping at the age of seven and grew up practicing battle raps with her brothers. Her first foray into songwriting was a rap about breakfast cereal set to Drake's "Started from the Bottom".

== Career ==
Kenzo B's breakout single was the 2022 song "Bump It", which samples the Dick Dale surf rock song "Miserlou". Towards the end of 2021, she teased a Triller for the song where she is wearing a ski mask. The song has received over 1.9 million views on YouTube.

Kenzo was signed to French Montana's Coke Boys label through Warner Records in October 2022. She recorded another iteration of "Bump It" featuring Young Devyn called "The Facts". She released the Top Dawg EP, her label debut, towards the end of 2022. It includes the track "Hood Love Story", which is an interpolation of Young Thug's "Love You More".

Kenzo was a guest vocalist on "Gang Gang", a song off of French Montana and DJ Drama's Coke Boys 6: Money Heist Edition mixtape. For the "Area Codes (718 remix)" by Kaliii, she represented New York City, and performed the song with Ice Spice at Hot 97's Summer Jam Stage.

Kenzo released the single "BFFR" (short for "be for fucking real") in June 2023. The song is a "nod to litefeeters" from New York. Her second EP, Top 2, Not 2 was released in June 2023 as well.

Kenzo has been called the Queen of Bronx drill. Her music incorporates elements from gangster rap, boom bap, and trap. Her rap and freestyle rap has been praised for her clean flow and her "magnetic ability to be both vicious and vulnerable". According to The Fader, she is known "for her throaty, brolic, and quick-witted bars".

== Discography ==
=== Extended plays ===
- Top Dawg (2022)
- Top 2, Not 2 (2023)

=== Singles ===
- "GEEK"
- "Bartender"
- "Sanctioned"
- "No Tweakin"
- "The Facts (feat. Young Devyn)"
- "Make It Lit"
- "Hood Love Story"
- "Gang Gang"
- "Get Up Close"
- "DeadGame"
- "Area Codes (718 remix)" (featuring Kenzo B)
- "BFFR"
- "Cheeeeks"
