= Laila! =

American singer (born 2006)

- Also known as: Baby Genius
- Born: Laila Smith; April 19, 2006 (age 20)
- Genres: Cloud rap; alternative R&B
- Occupations: Singer; songwriter; record producer
- Instruments: Vocals; piano; Logic Pro
- Years active: 2023–present
- Website: flyerthanu.com
- Relatives: Yasiin Bey (father)

Laila Smith (born April 19, 2006), known mononymously as Laila!, is an American singer.

== Early life ==
Smith is from Brooklyn, New York. Her father is Yasiin Bey, formerly known as Mos Def.

== Career ==
She began making music in 2020 at the age of 14 and released music on SoundCloud under the name Baby Genius. She wrote her debut single "Like That!", in 2023 when she was 16. In 2024, she announced her first album, Gap Year!. Half of this album was made at home in her bedroom. She self-produced her album. She performed at Tyler, the Creator's Camp Flog Gnaw Carnival in November 2024, alongside well-known viral rappers and musicians. Her second album, We’ll Never Be This Young Again, released on October 23, 2026.

== Discography ==
Laila! discography
- Studio albums: 2
- EPs: 1
- Singles: 3
- Music videos: 2

=== Studio albums ===
List of studio albums, with selected details
Title	Details	Peak chart positions		
Title	Details	US	US R&B/HH	CAN
Gap Year!	Released: September 6, 2024; Label: IIIXL Studio; Formats: digital download, streaming	—	—	—
We'll Never Be This Young Again	Release date: October 23, 2026; Label: IIIXL Studio; Formats: digital download, streaming	To be released		

=== Extended plays ===
List of extended plays, with selected details and chart positions
Title	Details	Peak chart positions		
Title	Details	US	US R&B/HH	CAN
IN CTRL!	Released: February 10, 2024; Format: Digital download, streaming	—	—	—

=== Singles ===
==== As lead artist ====
List of singles as lead artist, showing selected chart positions, certifications, and associated albums
Title	Year	Peak chart positions						Certifications	Album
Title	Year	US	US R&B /HH	CAN	UK	WW	TT	Certifications	Album
"Like That!"	2023	—	—	—	—	—	3		Gap Year!
"Wassup"	2023	—	—	—	—	—	—		Non-album single
"Not My Problem"	2024	—	25	—	—	—	16		Gap Year!
"Miss Mango"	2026	—	—	—	—	—	—		Non-album single
"—" denotes a recording that failed to chart, was ineligible for the chart, or was not released.

=== Music videos ===
==== As lead artist ====
List of music video appearances, indicating, where applicable, the associated album, directors, and year
Title	Year	Director
"Like That!"	2024	Bellamy Brewster
"Not My Problem"	2024	Otmara Marrero
"Miss Mango"	2026	Julius Gutierrez

== Filmography ==
- 2021: But Tomorrow (short film by Lin Que Ayoung) as Crystal

== Concert tour ==
- The Gap Year Tour (2025)

== Awards and nominations ==
Organization	Year	Category	Nominated work	Result	Ref.
Billboard	2025	Billboard 21 Under 21	Herself	Included	
Billboard	2026	Billboard 21 Under 21	Herself	Included	
