= Fisherrr =

2024 single by Cash Cobain and Bay Swag

Single by Cash Cobain and Bay Swag

from the album Play Cash Cobain
- Released: February 28, 2024
- Genre: Drill
- Length: 3:56
- Label: Giant
- Songwriters: Cashmere Small; Lloyd McKenzie Jr.; Kion Monsanto; Joshua Jubilee
- Producers: Cash Cobain; FckBwoy!; WhoJiggi

Cash Cobain singles chronology
"Dunk Contest" (2024)	"Fisherrr" (2024)	"Rump Punch" (2024)

Bay Swag singles chronology
"All Night Long" (2023)	"Fisherrr" (2024)	"Worldwide Sniper" (2024)

Remix cover
- Cover art of the official remix with Ice Spice

Music video
- "Fisherrr (Remix)" on YouTube

"Fisherrr" is a song by American rappers Cash Cobain and Bay Swag, released on February 28, 2024, as the second single from Cash Cobain's debut studio album, Play Cash Cobain. Produced by Cobain, FckBwoy! and WhoJiggi, it went viral on social media due to a dance associated with the song.

== Background ==
In an interview with Complex, Cash Cobain described the studio session in which he recorded the song:

I was with mad people. My studio sessions are crazy. I told Bay to pull up like, "Yo, bro, I'm about to do a studio session," and bro was there before me. When we got there, I pulled up this beat that me, WhoJiggi, and FckBwoy! made. I liked the beat drop, but it dropped too fast. So I'm like, "I don't wanna hear the beat yet. Just loop this part for me," and then me and Bay jumped into the booth. We had girls in the booth, and we were just going crazy. One chick was annoying Bay Swag, and he was like, "I'm trying to work." Then she asked me, "I'm annoying you?" I'm like, "Nah, you're my inspiration." But it was fun, though. For me, making music is fun, so we didn't put too much thought into it. But we knew it was fire though.

== Composition ==
With respect to style, the song has been described as "sexy drill". Cash Cobain performs in his signature slurry vocals, addressing a girl in the opening lines (which includes the lyrics "And your ass fat, know you eat your rice and your cabbage too"). The beat drops two minutes into the song, after the line "Just like 'And this beat from Cash not from YouTube' – yup, that's me, magic."

== Release and promotion ==
Cash Cobain teased the song on social media prior to its release. He and Bay Swag performed the song on the YouTube series From the Block, following which the video of their performance gained traction on YouTube and Instagram. The song received an official dance called the "Reemski", which led it to become a viral sensation on the video-sharing app TikTok. A number of celebrities have posted videos of themselves taking part in the dance, including Kai Cenat, La La Anthony, and her son, and Lance Stephenson.

== Critical reception ==
Alphonse Pierre of Pitchfork gave a favorable review, describing the beat as "dreamy yet jerky, the kind of slow-building rhythm that makes you want to fantasize about the last person you flirted with." He added, "Then there's Cash and Bay Swag's killer back-and-forth. The two Queens boys sweetly—and very provocatively—blur the lines between thirst and romance".

== Remix ==
On April 18, 2024, a remix of the song with American rapper Ice Spice leaked online. It was uploaded to YouTube by DJ Akademiks, who had received an anonymous DM with the remix on April 18. On April 20, Cash Cobain and Ice Spice were seen filming a music video for the remix in New York City. The remix was released on April 26, 2024.

In her verse, Ice Spice raps in a singsong flow about her wealth, being the "baddest boo", the results of eating oats and vegetables (which calls back to her song "Princess Diana"), among other topics. She also references her song "Munch (Feelin' U)".

=== Music video ===
A music video was released alongside the remix. Directed by KZA, it sees Cash Cobain, Bay Swag and Ice Spice hanging out at the restaurant New China Garden in the Bronx, where they order takeout and rap from a busy kitchen, as well as outside the Nereid Avenue station and in an abandoned lot surrounded by a crowd of people and a couple of luxury cars. Ice Spice also poses in the backseat of a car with handfuls of money. The visual is interspersed with clips filmed on a vintage camcorder which show the rappers greeting fans in the street and a Reemski circle dance which they take part in.

In regard to filming the video, Cash Cobain told Billboard, "We wanted to set a real, authentic New York vibe—we got the Chinese restaurant 'cause that's a staple in the hood. I just wanted it to be a Cash Cobain, Slizzy vibe, you know?"

== Charts ==
Chart performance for "Fisherrr"
Chart (2024)	Peak position
US Bubbling Under Hot 100 (Billboard)	11
US Hot R&B/Hip-Hop Songs (Billboard)	28
US Rhythmic (Billboard)	15

== Certifications ==
Certifications for "Fisherrr"
Region	Certification	Certified units/sales
United States (RIAA)	Gold	500,000^{‡}
^{‡} Sales+streaming figures based on certification alone.
