= WTF =

WTF commonly refers to:

- WTF (Internet slang), or what the fuck, an expression of disbelief

WTF or wtf may also refer to:

== Arts and entertainment ==
=== Books and online publications ===
- The Daily WTF, a blog about information technology "perversions"
- WTF? What's the Future and Why It's Up to Us, a 2017 book by Tim O'Reilly
- WTF? (book), a 2017 book by Robert Peston

=== Films, radio, TV, and video games ===
- Weird, True & Freaky, a documentary series on Animal Planet
- Work Time Fun, a video game for the PlayStation Portable
- "WTF", a segment on sexual fetishes on G4TV's Attack of the Show
- WTF, the former name of the British music television channel Now Rock
- WTF! (film), a 2017 American horror film
- "W.T.F." (South Park), or Wrestling Takedown Federation, the 191st episode of South Park
- WTF with Marc Maron, a podcast hosted by comedian Marc Maron
- WXTF-LP (WTF Radio), an American low-power nonprofit community radio station in Harrisville, Michigan
- "WTF!: Wrestling's Trashiest Fighters", an episode of RuPaul's Drag Race

=== Music ===
- WTF?, an electronic music supergroup comprising deadmau5, Tommy Lee, Steve Duda, and DJ Aero

==== Albums ====
- WTF?!, by KMFDM (2011)
- W.T.F. (Wisdom, Tenacity and Focus), by Vanilla Ice (2011)

==== Songs ====
- "WTF", by Heart from Red Velvet Car (2010)
- "WTF", by Wiz Khalifa from Cabin Fever (2011)
- "WTF?" (song), by OK GO (2010)
- "WTF (Where They From)", by Missy Elliott and Pharrell (2015)
- "WTF", by Sasha Alex Sloan from I Blame the World (2022)
- "WTF" (YoungBoy Never Broke Again and Nicki Minaj song), from Don't Try This at Home (2023)

=== Theater ===
- Williamstown Theatre Festival, Massachusetts, United States
- World Theatre Festival (disambiguation), various festivals

== Organizations ==
- Western Task Force, in World War II's Operation Torch
- Wikileaks Task Force, of the U.S. Central Intelligence Agency
- World Taekwondo, formerly known as the World Taekwondo Federation (WTF)

== Other uses ==
- ATP World Tour Finals (ATP WTF)
- Wobbly Transformation Format – 8-bit, an extension of UTF-8
- .wtf, an Internet top-level domain
- "WTF star" ("Where's The Flux"), or KIC 8462852, an unusual star
- Watiwa language (ISO 639-3 code: wtf)

== See also ==
- WT1190F, a large piece of space debris that came down to Earth on November 13, 2015
- WTFPL, or Do What the Fuck You Want To Public License, a permissive software license
- What the fuck (disambiguation)
- Whiskey Tango Foxtrot (disambiguation)
