= Whiskey Tango Foxtrot =

Whiskey Tango Foxtrot may refer to:

== Television ==
- "Whiskey Tango Foxtrot" (NCIS), a season eleven (2013) episode of the television series NCIS
- Whiskey Tango Foxtrot (Scandal), an episode of American television series Scandal
- "Whiskey-Tango-Foxtrot", a 2003 episode of the television series Jake 2.0
- "Whiskey Tango Foxtrot", a season three (2011) episode of The Good Wife
- Whiskey Tango Foxtrot, name adopted by cast members of The Real World: Hollywood for performing as a comedy troupe in season twenty

== Other uses ==
- Whiskey Tango Foxtrot (film), a 2016 film starring Tina Fey
- Whiskey Tango Foxtrot (novel), the 2014 debut novel by David Shafer
- Whiskey Tango Foxtrot, a 2007 memoir of photographer Ashley Gilbertson's time covering the war in Iraq

== See also ==
- Whiskey Tango (disambiguation)
- WTF (disambiguation)
