= David Shafer =

David Shafer may refer to:

- David Shafer (politician) (born 1965), American politician
- David Shafer (author), American author, produced Whiskey, Tango, Foxtrot

== See also ==
- David Schafer (born 1955), American artist
- David Shaffer (1936–2023), American pediatric psychiatrist
