= Whiskey Tango =

Whiskey Tango may refer to:

- "Whiskey Tango", song from the album Sleep No More by Jack Savoretti
  - "Whiskey Tango" (Benny Benassi and Mazzz Remix), song by Italian DJ Benny Benassi
- Whiskey Tango, working title for the series Frisky Dingo
- Whiskey Tango All American Bar and Grill, business founded by John Todora

== See also ==
- Whiskey Tango Foxtrot (disambiguation)
- Whiskey Tango Ghosts, 2004 album by Tanya Donelly
