= What the Duck (disambiguation) =

What the Duck is a comic strip by Aaron Johnson that was produced from 2006 to 2016.

What the Duck may also refer to:

- What the Duck (record label), a Thai record label
- What the Duck?!, a podcast by Ann Jones (Australian journalist)
- What the Duck, a 2018 Thai drama series broadcast on Line TV, and starring Puwanai Sangwan, Pakpoom Juanchainat, and Suppasit Jongcheveevat

- What the Duck 2 (aka What the Duck: Final Call), the second season of the series (2019), also broadcast on Line TV

== See also ==
- What the fuck (disambiguation)
