= What the Hell (disambiguation) =

"What the Hell" is a 2011 song by Canadian musician Avril Lavigne.

What the Hell may also refer to:

- "What the Hell", song by Ohio Players from Fire
- "What the Hell", song by South Korean boy band B.A.P. from Power
- "What the Hell", song by Tim Knol, 2011
- "What the Hell", song by Tokyo Dragons from Give Me the Fear, 2005
- What the Hell, album by Skew Siskin, 1999

== See also ==
- What the (disambiguation)
- What the Heck (disambiguation)
- What the fuck (disambiguation)
- What the helly
