= Scandal season 2 =

Season of American television series Scandal

Scandal
- Season 2
- DVD cover
- Starring: Kerry Washington; Columbus Short; Darby Stanchfield; Katie Lowes; Guillermo Diaz; Jeff Perry; Joshua Malina; Bellamy Young; Tony Goldwyn
- No. of episodes: 22

Release
- Original network: ABC
- Original release: September 27, 2012 – May 16, 2013

Season chronology
- ← Previous; Season 1 Next → Season 3

The second season of the American television drama series Scandal, created by Shonda Rhimes, began on September 27, 2012, in the United States, on ABC, and consisted of 22 episodes. The season was produced by ABC Studios, in association with ShondaLand Production Company; the showrunner being Shonda Rhimes. The program airs at the same time in Canada through the City television system with simsubbing of the ABC feed.

The season continues the story of Olivia Pope's crisis management firm, Olivia Pope & Associates, and its staff, as well as staff at the White House in Washington, D.C. Season two had nine series regulars, all returning from the previous season, out of which seven are part of the original cast of eight regulars from the first season. The season aired in the Thursday 10:00 pm time slot, the same as the previous season.

== Plot ==
The season has two arcs. The first arc focuses on Fitz's attempted assassination in addition to the election-rigging, of which, more information is revealed through flashbacks. James investigates Defiance and the election-rigging for Fitz's campaign. It's revealed through flashbacks that the rigging was done by Olivia, Cyrus, Mellie, Verna and Hollis at election campaign headquarters. James teams up with David to try to build a case to take down Cyrus and Fitz. However, James ultimately lies in court, covering for Cyrus.

An assassination attempt is made on Fitz's life, which almost kills him. As a result, Sally takes over as president, much to Cyrus' dismay. After surviving, Fitz decides to get a divorce, which Mellie tries to avoid by somehow convincing her OB/GYN to induce her labor 4 weeks early. Huck is arrested for the attempted assassination after being framed by his girlfriend Becky. After David helps Huck go free, Huck, Olivia and her team trick Becky to show up at the hospital where she is arrested. Fitz finds out that Verna was behind the assassination and kills her. At the funeral, he reveals to Olivia that he doesn't want a divorce as he is devastated after learning about the rigging from Verna.

The second arc focuses on finding the mole who is leaking classified information from the White House. Olivia and the team investigate the case after figuring out that the CIA Director's suicide was actually a murder. Olivia gets to know Captain Jake Ballard, who works with the leader of B613, Rowan, who orders Jake to get close to Olivia. At the end of the season, Mellie gives Fitz an ultimatum, either he becomes loyal to her, or she goes on national television and reveals Fitz's affair with Olivia. Fitz chooses Olivia, which makes Mellie reveal the affair. Fitz announces his re-election campaign.

As Olivia and the team continue to investigate who the mole is, Huck manages to capture Charlie, who reveals the mole's identity: Billy Chambers. They figure out that Billy is working with David, who steals the Cytron card, but frames Billy and gives Cyrus the card in exchange for being reinstated as US Attorney. At the end, Olivia's name is leaked to the press as being Fitz's mistress, and it is revealed that Rowan is Olivia's father.

== Cast and characters ==
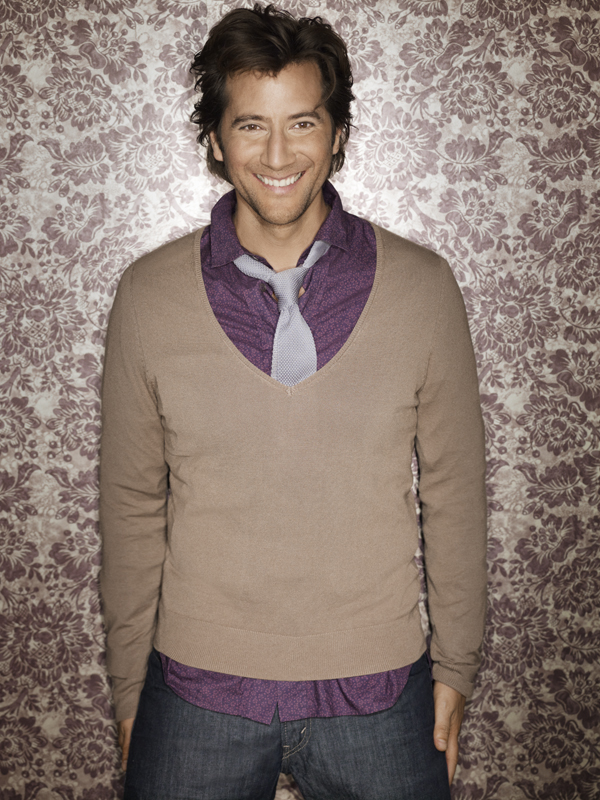
Henry Ian Cusick did not return for the second season.

The second season had nine roles receiving star billing, with all of them returning from the previous season, seven of which part of the original cast from the first season. Kerry Washington continued her role as protagonist of the series, Olivia Pope, a former White House Director of Communications with her own crisis management firm. Columbus Short played the character Harrison Wright, while Darby Stanchfield played Abby Whelan, who begins a relationship with David Rosen. Katie Lowes acted as Quinn Perkins who is on trial for murder at the beginning of the season, and Guillermo Diaz continued playing the character Huck, the troubled tech guy who works for Olivia. Jeff Perry played Cyrus Beene, the Chief of Staff at the White House. Joshua Malina played David Rosen, the U.S. Attorney who develops a relationship with Abby. Bellamy Young continued playing First Lady Melody "Mellie" Grant, and Fitz's Vice President nominee, while Tony Goldwyn portrayed President Fitzgerald "Fitz" Thomas Grant III.

Several casting changes occurred for the second season. Henry Ian Cusick exited the show and did not return as his character Stephen Finch for the second season as the actor and showrunner Shonda Rhimes came to the mutual decision for him not to come back for the second year. Both Bellamy Young, as First Lady of the United States, and Joshua Malina, as David Rosen, were bumped up to series regulars.

=== Main ===
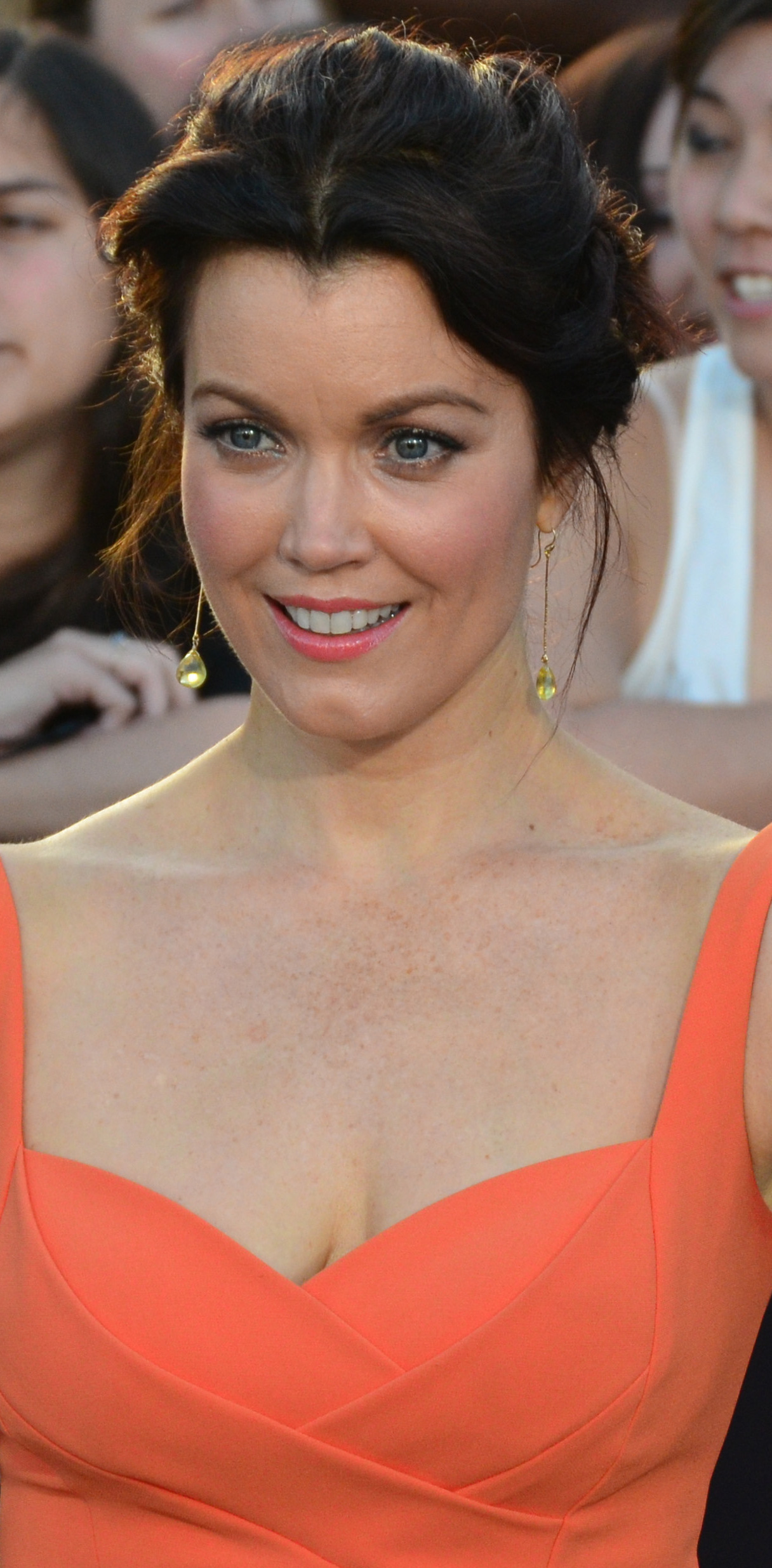
Bellamy Young was upgraded to a series regular for the second season.

- Kerry Washington as Olivia Pope
- Columbus Short as Harrison Wright
- Darby Stanchfield as Abigail "Abby" Whelan
- Katie Lowes as Quinn Perkins
- Guillermo Diaz as Huck
- Jeff Perry as White House Chief of Staff Cyrus Beene
- Joshua Malina as David Rosen
- Bellamy Young as First Lady Melody "Mellie" Grant
- Tony Goldwyn as President Fitzgerald "Fitz" Thomas Grant III

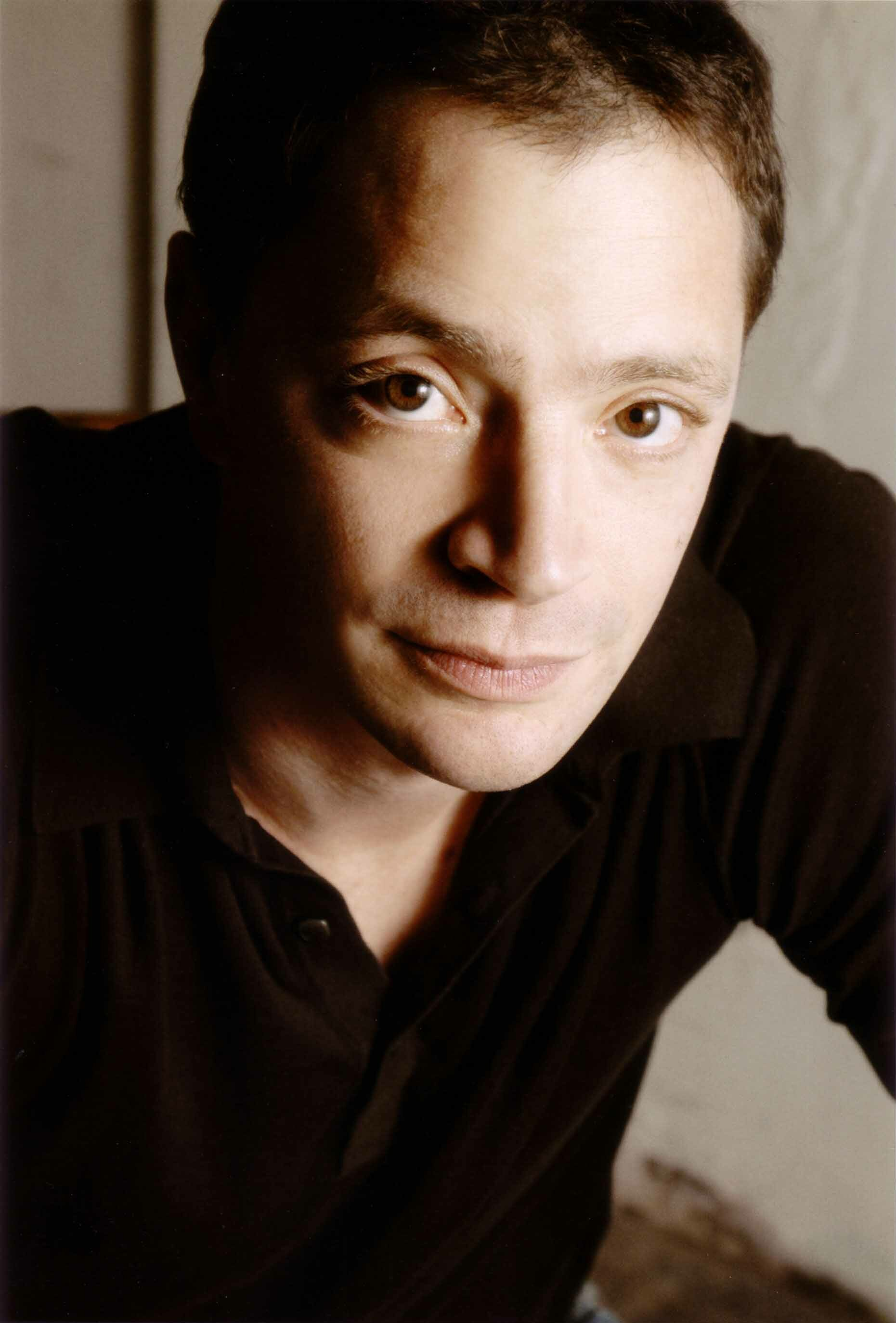
Joshua Malina was also upgraded to a series regular.

=== Recurring ===
- Gregg Henry as Hollis Doyle
- Dan Bucatinsky as James Novak
- Debra Mooney as Supreme Court Justice Verna Thornton
- Norm Lewis as Senator Edison Davis
- George Newbern as Charlie
- Scott Foley as Jacob "Jake" Ballard
- Kate Burton as Vice President Sally Langston
- Susan Pourfar as Becky Flynn
- Joe Morton as Rowan "Eli" Pope
- Sharmila Devar as Lauren Wellman
- Brian Letscher as Tom Larsen
- Samantha Sloyan as Jeannine Locke
- Kurt Fuller as CIA Director Grayden Osborne
- Brenda Song as Alissa
- Tom Amandes as Governor Samuel Reston
- Erica Shaffer as News Reporter
- Matt Letscher as Billy Chambers

=== Guest stars ===
- Jimmy Kimmel as himself
- Lorraine Toussaint as Nancy Drake
- Elise Neal as Anna Gordon
- Patrick Fischler as Arthur "Artie" Hornbacher
- Brenda Strong as Joan Reston
- Sam Anderson as Melvin Feen
- Barry Bostwick as Fitzgerald Grant II
- Eric Mabius as Peter Caldwell
- Lisa Edelstein as Sarah Stanner
- Melinda McGraw as Debora Clarkson
- Andrea Bowen as Maybelle Doyle
- John Barrowman as a fixer

== Episodes ==
No. overall	No. in season	Title	Directed by	Written by	Original release date	Prod. code	U.S. viewers (millions)
8	1	"White Hat's Off"	Tom Verica	Jenna Bans	September 27, 2012	201	6.74
Quinn's true identity is revealed to be the Molotov Mistress Lindsey Dwyer and as the Pope & Associates team digs deeper into her past they find that she may be their biggest scandal yet. Meanwhile, Cyrus and First Lady Mellie put President Grant in a compromising position during a live television interview and a Rhode Island Congressman requires Olivia's help to fix his sex scandal.
9	2	"The Other Woman"	Stephen Cragg	Heather Mitchell	October 4, 2012	202	6.56
Olivia has to deal with the ramifications of the jaw dropping verdict of Quinn’s court case, and Abby continues to press Olivia for answers. Meanwhile, in the White House, Cyrus and President Grant deal with a foreign policy emergency. However, Fitz becomes agitated when he realizes that his team is trying to force him to make hard decisions about foreign policy, so he seeks Olivia's help by calling her.
10	3	"Hunting Season"	Ron Underwood	Matt Byrne	October 18, 2012	203	6.17
Olivia watches Kimberly Mitchell's talk show discuss President Grant's decision on whether or not to go to war with Libya over photo-shopped photos of dead Sudanese children. Olivia sees Senator Edison Davis on the talk show and calls him to tell him that his tie is distracting on screen. He is glad to hear from her, considering it's been three years. When Olivia gets into her car a government official named Artie Hornbacker claims that the government is using a new technology called "Thorngate" to spy on U.S. citizens. He claims he knows about her late-night phone calls to the West Wing. Artie explains that while he was doing data entry he noticed some descrepencies leading to his discovery and subsequent stealing of "Thorngate" from the NSA. Abby, Harrison, and Quinn look into Artie and become convinced he's crazy. They get "Thorngate" up and running, and Artie reveals that he told someone else about "Thorngate." Edison wants Olivia to ask him out, but she asks him about "Thorngate" since he's on the Senate Intelligence Committee. Cyrus informs Fitz that "Thorngate" has been stolen and Olivia is representing Artie. He tells Fitz that he is a ticking time bomb, faking being happy since Olivia won't return his phone calls. Fitz finds out that Edison is Olivia's former fiancee and is back in her life when a secret service agent gives him photos as proof. Fitz goes duck hunting with Hollis Doyle. Fitz summons Olivia to join him hunting where he reveals to her he that knows about Edison. They kiss against a tree, ignoring Tom and Hal standing a few feet away, but afterwards Olivia claims their relationship is over. When Fitz returns home, Mellie tells him that if he sees Olivia again he won't be re-elected. Olivia picks Kimberly Mitchell to do an interview with Artie. Fitz puts an injunction against the network, making it treason for anyone to go through with the interview, but Olivia gets them to do it anyway. Artie escapes from Huck's house with the recently decrypted "Thorngate." The NSA shows up at OPA looking for Artie, but Olivia improvises and gets the NSA to give her 12 hours to find him. Fitz realizes that Cyrus used "Thorngate" on him; that's how he knew that Olivia wasn't taking his calls. Huck finds Artie and greets him with a toolbox. David joins OPA to uncover the true story behind the Lindsay Dwyer case. Edison declares himself a client of OPA. David and Abby have sex. Huck vows that his torture issues are under control.
11	4	"Beltway Unbuckled"	Mark Tinker	Mark Fish	October 25, 2012	204	6.11
Olivia and the team are on the case of a missing college student. They soon discover that the missing girl had been sleeping with senators and writing about the sex on a site called "Beltway Unbuckled". The team discovers she was murdered and identifies her killer, leading to a fight with the White House over diplomatic immunity. Abby and David's relationship continues to blossom, as President Grant and Mellie's relationship continues to flounder. Olivia and Fitz meet for dinner where Fitz ends their relationship. David continues to dig deeper into the Cytron investigation.
12	5	"All Roads Lead to Fitz"	Steve Robin	Raamla Mohamed	November 8, 2012	205	6.06
The people involved in the Cytron incident try to figure out how to keep David from uncovering the truth. Huck agrees to go on a date with someone he met at AA. Olivia continues to fight her attraction to Edison. Olivia and the team work on the case of a governor who murdered a man who was allegedly raping his wife. Cyrus becomes worried when his husband, James, goes back to work as a journalist after Cyrus tells him that they can't have a baby. Olivia finds out about Abby and David's relationship.
13	6	"Spies Like Us"	Bethany Rooney	Chris Van Dusen	November 15, 2012	206	6.02
Abby and Harrison try to convince Olivia to give one of them Stephen's office. Cyrus is furious at James for writing an article that will lead to Cyrus as the anonymous source. Olivia gets a letter that reveals more about Huck's past, putting his tenure at the firm in question. Olivia orders Harrison to break up Abby and David, so he pays one of David's ex-girlfriends to claim David abused her. OPA works on a case involving a group of spies.
14	7	"Defiance"	Tom Verica	Peter Noah	November 29, 2012	207	6.64
Harrison leads the team on the case of billionaire's son who is worried about his father's mental state. Olivia works with a senator who had an affair with a 21-year-old and is now resigning from his position. Cyrus and Mellie plan a birthday gala for President Grant. James digs deeper into an investigation into rigged voting machines using information given by David. President Grant is shot while entering the gala; his prognosis is unknown.
15	8	"Happy Birthday, Mr. President"	Oliver Bokelberg	Shonda Rhimes	December 6, 2012	208	7.39
President Grant is rushed to the hospital following the attempt on his life. While hospital staff attempts to resuscitate him, Olivia finds an American flag pin covered in his blood. A flashback reveals that she gave it to him the day of his inauguration. After the inaugural ball, Fitz calls Olivia in her office and they meet in the oval office, where they have sex. In present time Sally Langston has taken the oval, bringing Olivia back to the White House as she works with Cyrus to keep Sally in check. Right after Fitz got elected he, Cyrus, and Olivia went to Camp David to set his first-100-days agenda. Secret service agent Tom reveals to Fitz that there are security cameras in the oval. Back to present time, Olivia gives a press conference addressing Fitz's condition. Back in the past Olivia has been avoiding Fitz and Verna is sick of waiting to be nominated to the Supreme Court. Olivia and Fitz have an emotional conversation where Fitz tells her he loves her. During present time Sally schemes to get the cabinet to make her president. Olivia goes to get Mellie fresh clothes when she remembers the first time she told Fitz that she loves him. A series of flashbacks reveals more about Olivia's time in the White House and her relationship with the president, and what led her to resign.
16	9	"Blown Away"	Jessica Yu	Mark Wilding	December 13, 2012	209	7.14
While working in the White House, Olivia helps Vice President Sally Langston; Cyrus stumbles across the truth about James’s secret investigation; and one of Olivia’s associates struggles to come to terms with a shocking betrayal. Huck's girlfriend Becky framed him for the shooting on the president, but is able to persuade him to flee with her. But after Olivia talks to him, Huck wants to catch her. Becky finds out about Huck's plan and massacres the happy family Huck liked to watch.
17	10	"One for the Dog"	Steve Robin	Heather Mitchell	January 10, 2013	210	8.37
Huck is being held in an underground location and being tortured after being framed for shooting the president. The president is still in a coma. To save Fitz's presidency Mellie forges his signature saying he is awake and ready to head back to office. Acting President Sally Langston isn't buying it, so Olivia managed to release Huck, who tracks down and captures the real sniper. Olivia gets a call from Cyrus, who gives the phone to Fitz, revealing he is awake.
18	11	"A Criminal, a Whore, an Idiot and a Liar"	Stephen Cragg	Mark Fish	January 17, 2013	211	7.93
Flashbacks reveal more about the rigged election and Fitz's tense relationship with his father. To improve the polls Cyrus, Mellie, and Olivia tried to convince Fitz to bring his father onto the campaign. He eventually agrees, and "Big" Jerry joins the campaign. Olivia brings in Huck, Abby, and Harrison to gather dirt on Reston, per Jerry's orders. In present time Fitz deals with side-effects of his brain surgery. Sally takes advantage of that by trying to convince the cabinet to deny Fitz's reinstatement by questioning his mental capacity. Things get heated between Olivia and Edison after he makes a shocking accusation: he accuses her of being Fitz's mistress and forging the President's signature. In response, Olivia calls him sexist. A resting Fitz is visited by Mellie, who tells him they can do what ever he wants due to their increase of political capital. Fitz shocks Mellie by saying what he wants is a divorce. Meanwhile Edison apologizes and asks Olivia to marry him.
19	12	"Truth or Consequences"	Jeannot Szwarc	Peter Noah	January 31, 2013	212	8.09
OPA realizes that a quickly unraveling Olivia might not always wear a white hat when they discover the truth about the rigged White House election. In order to reel in Fitz, Mellie is forced to take extreme measures. David takes his investigation into the Cytron explosion to the next level and arrests Hollis Doyle. Flashbacks to the life Lindsay Dwyer and Jesse Tyler the weeks leading up to the explosion.
20	13	"Nobody Likes Babies"	Tom Verica	Mark Wilding	February 7, 2013	213	8.14
David learns the truth about the Cytron case; Olivia, Cyrus, Mellie, Hollis and Verna go to extremes to protect themselves. Verna tells Fitz she was the one who tried to assassinate him. She also reveals to him that she along with Cyrus, Olivia, Mellie, and Hollis rigged the election in his favor. Fitz removes Verna's oxygen mask and holds her hands back, ultimately killing her. At her funeral, Fitz gives the eulogy and doesn't say anything negative about Verna. Fitz also calls off the divorce after Olivia turns down Edison's proposal so she can wait for Fitz's divorce to be final.
21	14	"Whiskey Tango Foxtrot"	Mark Tinker	Matt Byrne	February 14, 2013	214	8.02
10 months later, after discovering the truth behind Defiance, Fitz is still struggling to figure out whom he can actually trust. Meanwhile Olivia is trying to move on with her life, and she meets a handsome stranger, Jake Ballard (Scott Foley), in a coffee shop who sparks her interest. Mellie tries to convince Fitz that Defiance was primarily Cyrus' fault. Fitz and Olivia meet again at Cyrus and James' baby christening, and end up having sex in an electrical closet. Afterwards, Olivia says that Defiance was a mistake, and Fitz tells her that he doesn't want her and that their relationship is over. Meanwhile back at Pope and Associates, for the first time they are working with David Rosen and not against him.
22	15	"Boom Goes the Dynamite"	Randy Zisk	Jenna Bans	February 21, 2013	215	7.68
Olivia and the team are hired by an up and coming politician, Peter Caldwell (Eric Mabius), part of an in-universe political dynasty; but this time instead of fixing a scandal, they're playing high-powered matchmaker. Meanwhile, David is trying to leave the past behind him, but when he feels like he's being followed, he finally turns to the team at OPA for help. Back at the White House, Fitz is still struggling with whom to trust and how to handle a delicate hostage situation. Olivia figures out that Will is having an affair with his sister-in-law, and she tells him to break it off. Jake just won't take no for an answer when it comes to dating Olivia.
23	16	"Top of the Hour"	Steve Robin	Heather Mitchell	March 21, 2013	216	8.51
Olivia takes on the White House when her firm is hired by a new client, Sarah Stanner (Lisa Edelstein), who has been accused of having an affair with a Supreme Court Justice nominee. Huck takes Quinn under his wing while looking for the mole, and Mellie and Cyrus continue to try to regain Fitz' trust, but unbeknownst to them he has a new confidant, Jake Ballard.
24	17	"Snake in the Garden"	Ron Underwood	Raamla Mohamed	March 28, 2013	217	7.97
Hollis Doyle calls Olivia in when his daughter, Maybelle, is kidnapped under suspicious circumstances. Olivia and Jake continue their relationship whilst Quinn and Huck's friendship strengthens. Problems at the White House spring up as Cyrus fights to be back in the president's corner whilst Mellie confronts Fitz. It turns out that Maybelle faked her own kidnapping in order to get money from her parents. The mole is exposed and taken care of, though all is not as one might expect.
25	18	"Molly, You in Danger, Girl"	Tom Verica	Chris Van Dusen	April 4, 2013	218	8.04
Olivia's team looks for a mistake in their assumption of the CIA Director's guilt as the mole, realizing their error could put them in grave danger. Meanwhile, Olivia and Jake's relationship becomes intimate while Fitz and Mellie's marriage hits a new low point. At Jake's apartment Olivia discovers that he has been spying on her leading to her falling and hitting her head when she tries to run from him. Jake discovers Fitz's romantic attachment to Olivia after her fall lands her in the hospital.
26	19	"Seven Fifty-Two"	Allison Liddi-Brown	Mark Fish	April 25, 2013	219	7.90
Secrets from Huck's life before Pope and Associates are revealed. Olivia and Fitz engage in an emotionally charged conversation, unaware of the fact that Jake could be watching. OPA looks into who attacked Huck and finds out that it is Huck's former fellow assassin Charlie. Olivia's team comes together to help one of their own. Meanwhile, Cyrus is becoming increasingly skeptical of Jake. Mellie makes a decision that could bring down the White House, she leaves Fitz for Blair House, taking Teddy with her. She gives Fitz 36 hours to choose her or she will go on national TV and reveal that he cheated on her.
27	20	"A Woman Scorned"	Tony Goldwyn	Zahir McGhee	May 2, 2013	220	8.07
Jake is still protecting Olivia, per Fitz's orders. The team continue their investigation into the mole and make a shocking discovery in the process. And back at the White House Mellie's ultimatum forces Cyrus into the role of "fixer". Fitz goes to Olivia's house and tells her he chooses her over Mellie, and they have sex. Mellie does the interview with James, and Cyrus is furious that she picked his husband. She reveals that Fitz has been unfaithful to her, but she fails to mention who the mistress is.
28	21	"Any Questions?"	Mark Tinker	Matt Byrne	May 9, 2013	221	8.87
Cyrus holds a press conference in which he claims the alleged affair is a private matter. He goes to Olivia's apartment to find Tom guarding the door. He gets Tom to open the door and walks in on Olivia and Fitz having sex. Olivia tells Fitz she is going to do everything she can to help with Mellie's interview scandal, but Fitz tells her to stand down. Cyrus is at the center of a big scandal at the White House; Olivia is betrayed by someone close to her. After Olivia persuades him, Fitz announces his re-election campaign.
29	22	"White Hat's Back On"	Tom Verica	Shonda Rhimes	May 16, 2013	222	9.12
While David was working with Billy Chambers he kept the Cytron card from Billy. At the White House Mellie, Fitz, Olivia, Hollis, and Cyrus discuss how to handle the Cytron card, and they plan to get the card from Billy. Fitz tells Olivia that he is going to run for president, and wants Olivia to be at his side. He tells her to find a way to make it work, and Fitz kisses her. The mystery man tells Jake he wants to meet with Olivia. OPA and David figure out that Governor Reston is working with Billy Chambers to out Defiance. Cyrus meets the mystery man who tells him to show Fitz Olivia and Jake’s sex tape. Olivia calls Cyrus to warn him about Reston, leading to Cyrus' heart attack. David gives the Cytron card to Billy. In Cyrus' hospital room Olivia tells Fitz to pretend to put Reston on the ticket as his running mate in order to get Billy to give them the Cytron card. Later Mellie walks into Cyrus' hospital room and Fitz tells her that he will divorce her and be with Olivia, and if she tries to stop him he will publicly call her a racist. A woman breaks into Olivia's home and tries to kill her, but Jake saves her. He tells her that he slept with her as part of a B613 mission. Cyrus comes to check on Olivia, and she tells him that she and Fitz are planning to be together. Cyrus responds that Fitz killed Verna Thornton. Huck attempts to torture Billy for the Cytron card, but when he can't bring himself to do it Quinn picks up the drill instead. Cyrus shows Fitz the sex tape of Olivia and Jake. The Cytron card David gave Billy turns out to be fake. David goes to Cyrus' office with proof of Billy's confession, leading to Billy going down and David getting a new job as the US Attorney of DC. Olivia gets a box with the confession and white hat, which she puts on. She then goes to the oval where she and Fitz reveal to each other that they know each other's secret, and Olivia pushes Fitz to run with Mellie at his side. He goes to Mellie and puts his head in her lap, asking for forgiveness. As Olivia leaves for her morning run the press calls her the president's mistress. She is pulled into a car with the mystery man in it. She looks at him, surprised, and says "Dad?"

== Reception ==
The second season got overwhelmingly positive reviews, with some calling the season a triumph. Ratings grew significantly over the second season, reaching a series high with the season finale which increased 25% in Total Viewers and 39% in Adult 18-49 compared to the first season's finale. The review aggregator website Rotten Tomatoes reports a 95% approval rating with an average rating of 9.1/10 based on 21 reviews. The website's consensus reads, "Owning its soap-like sensibilities, Scandal creates enticingly addictive narratives, with surprising twists and fascinatingly damaged characters."

== Ratings ==
=== Live + SD ratings ===
No. in series	No. in season	Episode	Air date	Time slot (EST)	Rating/Share (18–49)	Viewers (m)	18–49 Rank	Viewership rank	Drama rank
8	1	"White Hat's Off"	September 27, 2012	Thursdays; 10:00 p.m.	2.0/6	6.74	—N/a	—N/a	—N/a
9	2	"The Other Woman"	October 4, 2012	Thursdays; 10:00 p.m.	2.0/6	6.56	—N/a	—N/a	—N/a
10	3	"Hunting Season"	October 18, 2012	Thursdays; 10:00 p.m.	1.9/5	6.17	—N/a	—N/a	—N/a
11	4	"Beltway Unbuckled"	October 25, 2012	Thursdays; 10:00 p.m.	2.0/6	6.11	—N/a	—N/a	—N/a
12	5	"All Roads Lead to Fitz"	November 8, 2012	Thursdays; 10:00 p.m.	1.9/5	6.06	—N/a	—N/a	—N/a
13	6	"Spies Like Us"	November 15, 2012	Thursdays; 10:00 p.m.	2.0/6	6.02	—N/a	—N/a	—N/a
14	7	"Defiance"	November 29, 2012	Thursdays; 10:00 p.m.	2.2/6	6.64	—N/a	—N/a	—N/a
15	8	"Happy Birthday, Mr. President"	December 6, 2012	Thursdays; 10:00 p.m.	2.5/7	7.39	23	—N/a	4
16	9	"Blown Away"	December 13, 2012	Thursdays; 10:00 p.m.	2.4/7	7.14	22	—N/a	7
17	10	"One for the Dog"	January 10, 2013	Thursdays; 10:00 p.m.	2.8/8	8.37	14	23	6
18	11	"A Criminal, a Whore, an Idiot and a Liar"	January 17, 2013	Thursdays; 10:00 p.m.	2.6/7	7.93	16	—N/a	6
19	12	"Truth or Consequences"	January 31, 2013	Thursdays; 10:00 p.m.	2.7/8	8.09	13	21	6
20	13	"Nobody Likes Babies"	February 7, 2013	Thursdays; 10:00 p.m.	2.8/8	8.14	17	—N/a	7
21	14	"Whiskey Tango Foxtrot"	February 14, 2013	Thursdays; 10:00 p.m.	2.7/8	8.02	13	—N/a	3
22	15	"Boom Goes the Dynamite"	February 21, 2013	Thursdays; 10:00 p.m.	2.7/7	7.68	20	—N/a	6
23	16	"Top of the Hour"	March 21, 2013	Thursdays; 10:00 p.m.	2.7/8	8.51	11	20	4
24	17	"Snake in the Garden"	March 28, 2013	Thursdays; 10:00 p.m.	2.6/7	7.97	14	23	4
25	18	"Molly, You In Danger, Girl"	April 4, 2013	Thursdays; 10:00 p.m.	2.6/8	8.04	15	—N/a	4
26	19	"Seven Fifty-Two"	April 25, 2013	Thursdays; 10:00 p.m.	2.8/8	7.90	7	24	2
27	20	"A Woman Scorned"	May 2, 2013	Thursdays; 10:00 p.m.	2.6/8	8.07	13	—N/a	4
28	21	"Any Questions?"	May 9, 2013	Thursdays; 10:00 p.m.	3.2/9	8.87	6	23	1
29	22	"White Hat's Back On"	May 16, 2013	Thursdays; 10:00 p.m.	3.2/9	9.12	10	17	2

=== Live + 7 Day (DVR) ratings ===
No. in series	No. in season	Episode	Air date	Time slot (EST)	18–49 rating increase	Viewers (millions) increase	Total 18-49	Total viewers (millions)	Ref
8	1	"White Hat's Off"	September 27, 2012	Thursdays; 10:00 P.M.	0.9	2.56	3.0	9.31	
9	2	"The Other Woman"	October 4, 2012	Thursdays; 10:00 P.M.	0.8	2.26	2.8	8.82	
10	3	"Hunting Season"	October 18, 2012	Thursdays; 10:00 P.M.	0.9	2.42	2.8	8.58	
11	4	"Beltway Unbuckled"	October 25, 2012	Thursdays; 10:00 P.M.	0.8	2.28	2.0	8.38	
12	5	"All Roads Lead to Fitz"	November 8, 2012	Thursdays; 10:00 P.M.	1.0	2.51	2.9	8.56	
13	6	"Spies Like Us"	November 15, 2012	Thursdays; 10:00 P.M.	0.9	2.32	2.9	8.33	
14	7	"Defiance"	November 29, 2012	Thursdays; 10:00 P.M.	0.9	2.38	3.1	9.02	
15	8	"Happy Birthday, Mr. President"	December 6, 2012	Thursdays; 10:00 P.M.	0.9	2.33	3.4	9.72	
16	9	"Blown Away"	December 13, 2012	Thursdays; 10:00 P.M.	1.0	2.52	3.4	9.70	
17	10	"One for the Dog"	January 10, 2013	Thursdays; 10:00 P.M.	1.0	2.51	3.8	10.89	
18	11	"A Criminal, a Whore, an Idiot and a Liar"	January 17, 2013	Thursdays; 10:00 P.M.	1.1	2.49	3.7	10.42	
19	12	"Truth or Consequences"	January 31, 2013	Thursdays; 10:00 P.M.	1.2	3.03	3.3	11.13	
20	13	"Nobody Likes Babies"	February 7, 2013	Thursdays; 10:00 P.M.	1.0	2.69	3.8	10.83	
21	14	"Whiskey Tango Foxtrot"	February 14, 2013	Thursdays; 10:00 P.M.	1.1	2.87	3.8	10.89	
22	15	"Boom Goes the Dynamite"	February 21, 2013	Thursdays; 10:00 P.M.	1.2	2.94	3.9	10.62	
23	16	"Top of the Hour"	March 21, 2013	Thursdays; 10:00 P.M.	1.0	2.61	3.7	11.12	
24	17	"Snake in the Garden"	March 28, 2013	Thursdays; 10:00 P.M.	0.9	2.58	3.5	10.55	
25	18	"Molly, You in Danger, Girl!"	April 4, 2013	Thursdays; 10:00 P.M.	1.1	2.95	3.7	10.99	
26	19	"Seven Fifty-Two"	April 25, 2013	Thursdays; 10:00 P.M.	0.8	2.37	3.6	10.27	
27	20	"A Woman Scorned"	May 2, 2013	Thursdays; 10:00 P.M.	0.9	2.51	3.5	10.58	
28	21	"Any Questions?"	May 9, 2013	Thursdays; 10:00 P.M.	0.8	2.27	4.0	11.14	
29	22	"White Hat's Back On"	May 16, 2013	Thursdays; 10:00 P.M.	0.8	2.48	4.0	11.60	

== Awards and nominations ==
Award	Category	Nominee	Result
BET Award	Best Actress	Kerry Washington	Won
Imagen Award	Best Actor/Television	Guillermo Díaz	Nominated
NAACP Image Award	Outstanding Drama Series	Scandal	Won
NAACP Image Award	Outstanding Actress in a Drama Series	Kerry Washington	Won
Primetime Emmy Award	Outstanding Lead Actress in a Drama Series	Kerry Washington	Nominated
Creative Arts Emmy Award	Outstanding Guest Actor in a Drama Series	Dan Bucatinsky	Won
Vision Award	Best Drama	Scandal	Nominated

== DVD release ==
The Complete Second Season was released in Region 1 on September 3, 2013. The release was packed with exclusive bonus features, including a behind-the-scenes featurette, an interview with actor Guillermo Diaz about his character "Huck", deleted scenes, a blooper reel and the extended version of the season finale episode "White Hat's Back On". For a limited time only on Target Stores, the season was released with a bonus disc attached, that included the extended version of the episode "Happy Birthday, Mr. President".

Scandal: The Complete Second Season
Set Details	Special Features
22 Episodes (1 extended); 5-Disc Set; English (Dolby Digital 5.1 Surround); English SDH, Spanish and French subtitles; Runtime: 966 minutes	A Closer Look: President Grant's Assassination Attempt; Being Huck - Interview with Actor Guillermo Diaz on the making of episode "Seven Fifty-Two"; Extended Finale - "White Hat's Back On"; Deleted Scenes; Outtakes/Bloopers; Extended Episode: "Happy Birthday, Mr. President" (Target DVD Exclusive)
Release Dates
Region 1	Region 2
September 3, 2013	February 17, 2014
