= Snake in the Garden =

- Scandal episode
- Episode no.: Season 2 Episode 17
- Directed by: Ron Underwood
- Written by: Heather Mitchell
- Original air date: March 28, 2013

Guest appearances
- Scott Foley as Jake Ballard; Kurt Fuller as Grayden Osborne; George Newbern as Charlie; Andrea Bowen as Maybelle Doyle; Joe Morton as Mysterious Man

Episode chronology
← Previous "Top of the Hour"	Next → "Molly, You In Danger, Girl"

"Snake in the Garden" is the seventeenth episode of the second season of Scandal. It premiered on ABC on March 28, 2013.

The episode marks the first appearance of Joe Morton and the first mention of Operation Remington both of which would continue to play key roles throughout the remainder of the second and third seasons.

== Plot ==
Fitz asks Jake to find more information from the same source that leaked the location of the Kashfar hostages hinting at a promotion if he is successful.

Across town David returns home to find his apartment ransacked. He hears someone in his apartment and hides, seeing only the shoes of the burglar as they retreat. Shaken up he relocates to Olivia's offices.

As Huck and Quinn tail CIA director Osborne they realize they've been made as he makes his way to Olivia's building. They warn Olivia that he is coming and she hides Wendy's flash drive which Jake, who is watching through the cameras he has in her apartment, sees. The two have a tense meeting and Osborne tell her to back off. While he is at Olivia's apartment the cameras Jake is using malfunction.

The next morning Hollis Doyle arrives at Olivia's offices with his fourth ex-wife and a video of his daughter Maybelle telling him she has been kidnapped and he needs to wire 20 million dollars to a secret account. His wife is moved to tears but Doyle believes that his daughter orchestrated the entire thing in order to access his money after he cut her off for being a drug addict. He asks the team to locate his daughter but refuses to pay any money in order to ensure her safety. While the team search for Maybelle, Hollis is sent a package that contains Maybelle's ear but remains unmoved until he is sent video evidence of Maybelle missing the ear. The team sends half the money to the kidnapper and then send the other half after they see Maybelle is alive. They bring her to a hospital where she tells them her ex-boyfriend was the kidnapper.

Jake breaks into Olivia's apartment to fix the cameras and steal the flash drive she has hidden. He brings the information to Fitz, and tells him that Osborne is the mole.

Cyrus discovers through Charlie that Fitz was involved with Jake in a top secret mission in Iran called Operation Remington. He tells Fitz that the work he did stealing votes in Defiance is similar to Fitz's top secret mission in Iran and Fitz brings him back to the fold, telling Cyrus about his plans to raid Osborne's house and expose him as the mole.

Huck and Harrison discover that Maybelle staged her kidnapping. When she tries to leave with her money, she is confronted by her parents. Hollis makes her decided between their family and the money; Maybelle chooses the money.

Osborne goes to Cyrus and denies that he's the mole. Cyrus informs him that it's out of his hands and that Fitz has made the decision. Osborn is found dead with a seemingly self-inflicted gunshot wound. Elsewhere, Jake sits on a bench drinking coffee when a man (Joe Morton) sits down beside him. They chat about the weather before the man praises Jake for staging Osborne's suicide and convincing everyone he's the mole.

== Production ==
The episode marks the first appearance of Joe Morton and the first mention of Operation Remington both of which would continue to play key roles throughout the second and third seasons. Morton was later promoted to series regular for the fifth season of the series.

== Release ==
"Snake in the Garden" premiered on ABC on March 28, 2013. It served as the midseason finale of Scandal season two.

=== Critical reception ===
The A.V. Club's Ryan McGee gave the episode a B+ rating, writing that the final third of the episode was so well written it made up for the lack of interesting content in the rest of the episode.
