= Nobody Likes Babies =

- Scandal episode
- Episode no.: Season 2 Episode 13
- Directed by: Tom Verica
- Written by: Mark Wilding
- Original air date: February 7, 2013

Guest appearances
- Debra Mooney as Verna; Gregg Henry as Hollis Doyle; Dan Bucatinsky as James Novak; Norm Lewis as Senator Edison Davis; Brenda Song as Alissa; George Newbern as Charlie; Samantha Sloyan as Jeannine Locke

Episode chronology
← Previous "Truth or Consequences"	Next → "Whiskey Tango Foxtrot"

Nobody Likes Babies is the thirteenth episode of the second season of Scandal. It premiered on February 7, 2013 in the U.S. The episode marks the end of the original 13 episode order producer Shonda Rhimes received from ABC which Rhimes wrote as a self-contained arc.

== Plot ==
Hollis enters the elevator where Charlie is waiting to assassinate him. Huck enters shortly after and saves Hollis though he warns that unless Hollis keeps his mouth shut about Defiance Huck will let Charlie earn his pay check.

In the previous episode, Pope & Associates the team traced the money from Becky’s account and discovered the payment she got for the assassination attempt of President Grant didn't come from Hollis. Olivia goes to the White House to speak to Cyrus about keeping Hollis alive and keeping the truth about the rigged election from the president. While she is speaking with Cyrus, Fitz enters the room and tells her that despite the birth of his new son he is going forward with his divorce. He asks her not to marry Edison and wait for him, instead. Olivia tells him she will think about it.

Olivia then visits Supreme Court Justice Verna Thornton once she realizes that must have been her who ordered the assassination attempt on President Grant. Verna confesses, then calls David Rosen as soon as Olivia leaves. However, Rosen is prevented from visiting because the president is on his way to visit her, himself. She dies during his visit.

The gladiators listen to tapes made from the surveillance Huck had in David’s apartment hoping to find some information they can use to stop him from discovering information on Defiance. While listening to the tapes they discover that he has the faulty Cytron Card used to rig the election. Abby, who has been listening to the tapes as well, realizes that David loved her and confronts Olivia about her plot to break the two of them up. She goes to David’s apartment and they reunite.

Meanwhile, David subpoenas James to testify before a grand jury. James confronts Cyrus, wanting to know whether he rigged the election or not. After Cyrus confesses, James tells him he has no choice but to testify. In a desperate bid to protect himself and Olivia, Cyrus hires Charlie to assassinate his husband only to change his mind at the last minute. Olivia and Cyrus believe they are going to jail, but James lies on the stand and Abby returns to the offices having broken into David’s safe and retrieved the card, leaving David with no evidence with which to prosecute. He confronts her at the office and ends their relationship.

Before Verna’s funeral Olivia returns Edison’s grandmother’s ring to him. Then at the funeral, she tells President Grant that she will wait for him—but he tells her he’s changed his mind. As he gives the eulogy, a flashback reveals that before she died Verna revealed that Cyrus, Mellie and Olivia rigged the election for him and that she tried to assassinate him in order to set things right without admitting her guilt to anyone and tarnishing her legacy. She tells him that she's changed her mind about preserving her reputation now, and plans to reveal all to David. President Grant stops her by removing her oxygen mask and pinning her down, causing her death.

As a distraught Olivia cries after Verna’s funeral service, the President and the First Lady reunite. He vows that from now on she will be the only one he trusts.

== Production ==
Scandal was officially renewed on May 11, 2012 for a 13 episode order. While waiting to hear if ABC would pick up the show for a full 22 episode season, producer Shonda Rhimes stated that no matter what the first 13 episodes would be a self-contained arc asserting that "we're doing 13 episodes and if we get more than that, we'll be telling two different season-long arcs.”

As part of the promotion for the episode Rhimes also released an official White House press release announcing the birth of Theodore “Teddy” Wallace Grant.

Speaking about his character’s last minute reversal on his relationship with Olivia Pope, Tony Goldwyn admitted that filming the scenes were upsetting revealing: "I was completely shocked... I couldn’t process that. I had, like, a literal and physical reaction."

== Reception ==
=== Critical response ===
Time listed Nobody Likes Babies as one of their Top 10 TV Episodes of 2013 hailing the episode for "closing out a season 2 opening arc in which the show found its seamy, lusty reason for being."

=== Awards ===
Actor Dan Bucatinsky won a Primetime Emmy Award for Outstanding Guest Actor in a Drama Series for his work on the episode.
