= World Theatre Festival =

World Theatre Festival may refer to:

- World Theatre Festival (Brisbane), held in Brisbane, Australia, from 2010 to 2015
- World Theatre Festival (Carnumtum), held in an ancient amphitheatre near the village of Petronell-Carnuntum, Austria, since around 1988
- World Theatre Festival (Denver), held in Denver, Colorado, US, in 1982
- World Theatre Festival (Shizuoka), held in Shizuoka city, Japan, ongoing
- World Theatre Festival (Zagreb), held in Zagreb, Croatia, since 2003

== See also ==
- International Theater Festival (Baltimore), held in Baltimore, Connecticut, US, in 1981
- Old World Theatre Festival, held at the India Habitat Centre in Delhi, India
- World Festival of Children's Theatre, based in Lingen (Ems), Germany
