= Molly, You in Danger, Girl =

- Scandal episode
- Episode no.: Season 2 Episode 18
- Directed by: Tom Verica
- Written by: Chris Van Dusen
- Original air date: April 4, 2013

Guest appearances
- Scott Foley as Jake Ballard; George Newbern as Charlie; Joe Morton as Mysterious Man; Mageina Tovah as Molly

Episode chronology
← Previous "Snake in the Garden"	Next → "Seven Fifty-Two"

"Molly, You in Danger Girl" is the eighteenth episode of the second season of Scandal. It premiered on April 4, 2013 in the U.S.

== Plot ==
Jake breaks into Olivia's apartment and removes all surveillance. However this is done in anticipation of Huck and Quinn's regular sweep of Olivia's apartment. They check to ensure that there are no bugs and after they leave Jake returns and re-plants all the cameras.

Olivia is approached by Osborne's widow who tells her that she believes Osborne's suicide note to be fraudulent because he addressed her by her full name Susan. Olivia decides to accept her as a client and the team begins to retrace their steps, trying to confirm whether or not Albatross was Osborne. Abby, realizing that David could be in danger, relocates him back to the Olivia Pope and Associates offices.

When Jake realizes that Olivia no longer believes that Osborne is the mole he relays this information to the mysterious man (Joe Morton) he met with in Snake in the Garden. The man tells Jake that he trusts him to handle Olivia.

Huck and Quinn try to pursue another lead in a storage facility but after Huck disappears, Quinn is forced to go looking for him and finds him locked in a box in a storage unit, almost completely catatonic.

The team manages to track down Molly, Wendy's roommate, who readily admits that the information about Osborne was faked but insists she did not lie for money, only to preserve her life. Sometime after they speak with her they receive a call from the coroner's office informing them of her death.

Olivia cancels on a date with Jake in order to work. However, after she catches an interview that Fitz and Mellie give she heads over to Jake's apartment with burgers. While there she and Jake sleep together. She gets up in the middle of the night to get a glass of water and turns on Jake's TV's only to see her own apartment in the screens. Horrified she tries to run away but is stopped by Jake who claims he is trying to protect her. Olivia is injured in the ensuing struggle but not before Jake shows her that an assassin has entered her apartment.

Olivia wakes up in a hospital where Jake quickly tells her that she must lie and tell whoever asks that a man broke into her apartment and that Jake burst in and rescued her. Before she can question him Fitz arrives with his entourage and, after shaking Jake's hand and thanking him, embraces Olivia.

== Title ==
The title is a quote from the 1990 film Ghost, spoken by Whoopi Goldberg as Oda Mae Brown. Coincidentally, Ghost also starred Tony Goldwyn, who plays President Fitzgerald Grant in Scandal.

== Reception ==
The episode received positive reception from critics, with The A.V. Club describing it as "one of the best" pieces of television of the week and Entertainment Weekly complimenting the episode's tension and pacing.
