= What The =

What the may refer to:

- What The--?!, a Marvel Comics comic book series self-parodying the Marvel Universe
- What The..., a 2013 album by Black Flag

== See also ==
- What the Hack
- What the Health
- What the Heck (disambiguation)
- What the Hell (disambiguation)
- What the fuck (disambiguation)
