= Top of the Hour =

- Scandal episode
- Episode no.: Season 2 Episode 16
- Directed by: Steve Robin
- Written by: Heather Mitchell
- Original air date: March 21, 2013

Guest appearances
- Scott Foley as Jake Ballard; Lisa Edelstein as Sarah Stanner; Mandalynn Carlson as Annie Stanner; Samantha Sloyan as Jeannine Locke

Episode chronology
← Previous "Boom Goes the Dynamite"	Next → "Snake in the Garden"

Top of the Hour is the sixteenth episode of the second season of Scandal. It premiered on March 21, 2013 on ABC.

== Plot ==
Before Olivia can go on her second date with Jake she is interrupted by a phone call from work. Before she goes she gives Jake the information found in Wendy's files pertaining to the Kashfar hostages.

She then goes to her new client Sarah Stanner (Lisa Edelstein). Stanner's home is surrounded by news outlets due to the discovery of an affair between Stanner and her former law professor who is now President Grant's nominee for Supreme Court Justice. At the top of the hour when the news outlets begin reporting Olivia and her team sneak into Stanner's home where she admits that the accusations are all true.

Huck and Quinn follow Osbourne to see if he's truly the mole. Convinced that the drops happen in plain sight they track him to a dry cleaners. Quinn picks up Osbourne's suits and finds an envelope filled with cash in the front pocket and then returns it so that he doesn't realize that anyone is following him.

Outside of the Oval Office where Jake and Fitz are meeting Cyrus and Mellie fight for access to the president with Cyrus ultimately winning and Mellie continuing to be shut out.

Olivia urges Stanner to come clean about her affair and release a statement to the media. With her husband's support she does so. Cyrus and the White House hit back claiming that Stanner was a deranged stalker and leaking lewd photos of her jeopardizing her career while ensuring that Fitz's nominee will go through.

Desperate to get back in Fitz's good graces Mellie delves into his schedule and discovers a series of late night private meetings. She believes that the meetings signify a renewed relationship with Olivia.

Jake goes to see Olivia at the Stanner house in order to ascertain more information on the files she leaked to him. She assures him that they are real but in the middle of their conversation they have their picture taken by a paparazzo.

Olivia and Harrison attempt to protect Stanner's career and find evidence that the affair was mutual. Unfortunately further evidence reveals that the affair went on much longer than was initially revealed causing Sarah's husband to withdraw his support and even question the paternity of their children. The further allegations also torpedo Fitz's nominee causing him to call Olivia and the two argue some more. Olivia then goes to Sarah and the two drink together while Sarah reveals that she does not know who the father of her child is.

Jake goes to see Fitz and gives him the information that Olivia gave him of the Kashfari hostages. Fitz is able to deploy a team to rescue them creating a wave of public support with the American people and re-establishing his pick for Supreme Court Justice as a viable one. Mellie, who saw Jake leave Fitz's office after the meetings, digs up information on him and gives it to Cyrus.

Meanwhile, Jake assaults the photographer who took the pictures of him with Olivia and steals the memory card with the pictures from his camera.

Harrison and Abby are unable to find any loopholes in the morality clause in order to protect Sarah's career. However Abby decides to bluff with corporation, crashing the meeting where they plan to fire Sarah and informing the members of the board that she has dirt on every single one of them. When she threatens to read it they fall for the ruse ensuring Sarah's job is safe.

Olivia has a paternity test done on Stanner's daughter Annie played by Mandalynn Carlson though Stanner's husband ultimately decides not to see the results.

Jake goes to Olivia's apartment to inform her that the Kashfar hostages are free. Olivia is shocked by the bruise on his face and lets him in after he tells her he was mugged.

Osbourne receives a call from the man who does his dry cleaning who sends him pictures of Quinn picking up his suits.

== Production ==
News of Lisa Edelstein's casting was released in February 2013.

== Reception ==
=== Critical reception ===
After a multi-episode hiatus The A.V. Club began reviewing the series again after having stopped early in season two. Writer Ryan McGee admitted that he had been wrong in his "hesitation about the arc that would ultimately lift Scandal from "promising" to legitimately great television." He gave the episode a B letter grade.
