= Boom Goes the Dynamite =

- Scandal episode
- Episode no.: Season 2 Episode 15
- Directed by: Randy Zisk
- Written by: Jenna Bans
- Original air date: February 21, 2013

Guest appearances
- Scott Foley as Jake Ballard; Sam Page as Will Caldwell; Mageina Tovah as Molly

Episode chronology
← Previous "Whiskey Tango Foxtrot"	Next → "Top of the Hour"

Boom Goes the Dynamite is the fifteenth episode of the second season of Scandal. It premiered on February 21, 2013 in the U.S.

== Plot ==
Leaving school after teaching, David Rosen is spooked when all the lights of the school turn off one by one, causing him to flee.

Olivia meanwhile heads to her dinner with Jake who relocates from the restaurant to the Jefferson Memorial. While there Olivia quizzes him on Albatross, the case that Wendy was working on before she was murdered. Jake tells Olivia that the name Albatross is an inside joke in the intelligence community, a mysterious shadow figure used as a scapegoat whenever things go wrong. Olivia abruptly leaves their date to go to her offices where the team try to assess whether or not someone is really stalking David. The team decide that Huck will be assigned to protect him, but not before they notice that Huck has begun to smell and has stopped taking showers.

Meanwhile, Jake leaves their date in order to go meet with Fitz who he knows from their time in the navy. It is revealed that Jake has been surveying Olivia at Fitz's personal request. He reports on her behaviour to Fitz despite having misgivings as to why he is watching her and does not reveal that he has been in contact with her and has taken her out on a date.

The gladiators start work on Will Caldwell's bid for governor of North Carolina. Caldwell, a member of a Republican political dynasty, is rumoured to be gay. Olivia tries to convince Will to become the first gay governor but after Will denies that he is gay he and his family decide to arrange a marriage for Will and the team begin scouting successful women as potential wives. After a meeting with one of the potential future wives goes well, Abby accosts the woman as she is leaving the office and warns her against being in a political marriage. Olivia is initially irritated by Abby's interference but lets it slide after Abby reminds Olivia that her own political marriage ended with violence and abuse.

The hostage situation intensifies with Fitz feeling his hands are tied since there is a mole in his administration. After the terrorists holding the soldiers send in a tape of them murdering one of them to U.S. news networks, Cyrus suggests to Mellie that Fitz needs to send drones to Kashfar as a show of strength. Despite Mellie telling Cyrus that she will credit him with the suggestion she takes full credit for the idea herself.

David goes back to work under the assumption that Huck is protecting him. However a rainstorm triggers memories of Huck's waterboarding, causing him to become immobile and have a panic attack. David is left to fend for himself and confronts his stalker who turns out to be Molly, Wendy's roommate who believes that David is innocent and that Wendy was murdered after a fight she had with a man who threatened her after learning about the intelligence she had.

The Caldwells struggle with their choice of a runner-up but are impressed when they meet her. Olivia learns that Fitz will be present at the fundraiser dinner where the Caldwells plan to introduce the new arranged fiancé. Olivia goes to Cyrus wanting to know why he didn't warn her about Fitz being at her work event and he reveals that he's been completely cut out of Fitz's circle and usurped by Mellie. Olivia tells him to simply wait for Mellie to overstep her bounds.

The parents of the soldiers grow angry at Fitz and his administration believing that the bombings on Kashfar are endangering their children. Mellie decides to speak to them privately about the situation and Cyrus leaks the story. After discovering what Mellie has done Fitz begins to freeze her out while bringing Cyrus back into the fold.

Right before Olivia heads out to dinner she receives a call from Harrison that the story about the Caldwells' auditioning wives has been leaked. Harrison manages to shut the story down and Olivia realizes that the information was leaked by Marion Caldwell, Will's sister-in-law, and the two have been having an affair. Olivia urges Will to end the affair and put his career first. Later, Will's older brother Peter reveals he's known about the affair all along but has refused to confront Will as he didn't want Will to fight to be with Marion and jeopardize his career.

Huck is finally able to decrypt Wendy's flash drive and brings the information to Olivia. They find the names and information of the Kashfar hostages and realize that Albatross is the one who leaked their names to the terrorists. When they show Molly video images of the man who they think attacked Wendy, she instead identifies CIA director Osbourne, whose image happened to be playing on the TV at that exact moment.

== Production ==
Costume designer Lyn Paolo chose a black and white Escada dress for Olivia to wear during the fundraiser dinner noting that "because Olivia's life and loves are once again in turmoil, we have transitioned to a gown that is both black and white, feminine and romantic."

== Reception ==
=== Critical response ===
Vulture named Olivia Pope's Escada evening dress in their list of The 10 Best Outfits We Spotted on TV This Season.
