= Mandalynn Carlson =

American actress (born 1999 or 2000)

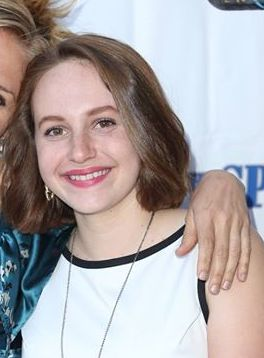
- Carlson at the screening of The Sparrows: Nesting at Raleigh Studios in Hollywood, California, April 20, 2015
- Born: 1999 (age 26–27)
- Occupation: Actress
- Years active: 2009–present
- Height: 5 ft 2 in (157 cm)
- Website: mandalynncarlson.com

Mandalynn Carlson (born 1999) is an American actress whose first film appearance was in a supporting role in the 2011 action biopic Machine Gun Preacher, with Gerard Butler. Leaving Michigan for Hollywood, Carlson has had supporting and lead roles in independent films and television shows including Grey's Anatomy and CSI: NY.

== Early years ==
Carlson is an only child born to Eric and Sherri Carlson. Her grandmother Pauline Ettore was a councilwoman for Taylor, Michigan. Her parents owned Michigan Crafty & Motion Picture Catering which sparked her interest in the industry.

Homeschooled since the 6th grade, Carlson began college at the age of 15.

== Career ==
Carlson began her acting career in 2010 with a supporting role in Machine Gun Preacher. Carlson was in local projects in Detroit including the period piece, Mary's Buttons (2012), which was based on a true story and Naked Angel (2014). She co-starred on an episode of CSI: NY as a teenager who was a victim of a senseless shooting. She was in a skit on Jimmy Kimmel Live! in 2012.

In 2013, Carlson worked on her first pilot for NBC, Brenda Forever, where she was the lead alongside Ellie Kemper and Ken Marino. NBC passed on the pilot and Carlson worked on ABC's show Scandal, playing the daughter of a love affair between a high powered CEO and a nominee for a Supreme Court judge in the episode Top of the Hour.

Carlson acted with Reisig in a film, Small Town Santa (2014) starring Dean Cain and Christine Lakin. Carlson worked with Cain again on her next film, A Horse for Summer (2015), playing the lead role of Summer Dean, a troubled teen who bounces from foster home to foster home while her mother is in jail. She is eventually sent to live with her uncle whom she has never met. The film was Nancy Criss' directorial feature debut.

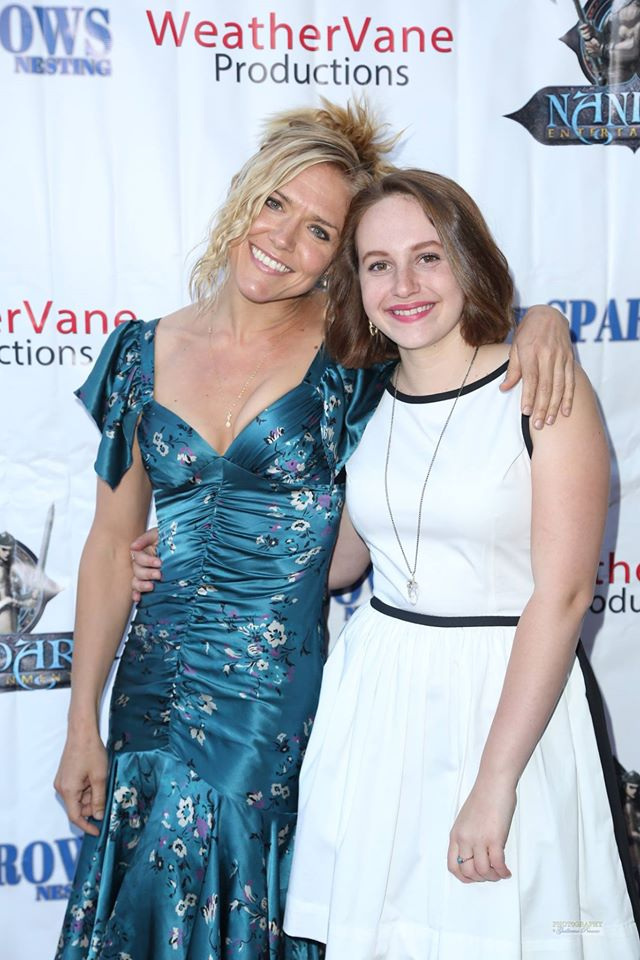
Mandalynn Carlson (right) and Dominique Swain at the screening of The Sparrows: Nesting

In 2015, Carlson worked on Deadly Sanctuary (2015), her third film with Cain and second with Nancy Criss. She then had a lead role on A Horse Tail playing Patrick Muldoon's daughter. Carlson and Atkins worked on an indie film together less than two years later, titled The Sparrows: Nesting (2015) toured the film festivals.

Carlson finished filming Fishes 'N Loaves: Heaven Sent where Muldoon plays her father in a feature film for the second time. The film is a faith based film set to be released in 2016. She was in the 2015 season 12 premiere of Grey's Anatomy playing the role of Jessica Tanner. Carlson plays Sam Lambert in Roadside Stars.

In 2017, Carlson directed an episode of Creepy Chronicles. "The Keeper", was episode 102 in the series which debuted on Amazon Prime. She was also executive producer on episode 2 and on episode 3 called "Pool Party", under her production company Smash the Glass Pictures.

Carlson joined Pure Flix's series, Hilton Head Island in season 2, recurring as troubled teen Katy Trisk.

== Personal life ==
Carlson is an activist against bullying, coming from the perspective of "living in that moment" during her elementary and middle school years. The bullying by schoolmates in grades 4–6 led her parents to choose home schooling for her. In 2013–14, she was a guest speaker on the TBTG Music Is My Language Tour around Southern California schools, promulgating a positive message of acceptance while advocating against bullying.

Carlson speaks with young girls about self-image and has written articles about the topic. She has visited underprivileged children in the Watts projects, supported the Ronald McDonald House of Pasadena fundraisers and visited chronically ill children at Children's Hospital Los Angeles.

== Filmography ==
=== Film ===
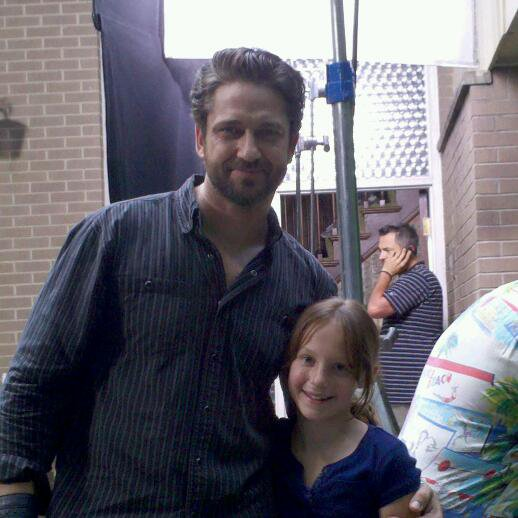
Gerard Butler and Carlson on the set of Machine Gun Preacher in Detroit, July 2010

Year	Title	Role	Notes
2010	Margaret & Izzy	Little Margaret	Short film
2011	Happy Holiday	Christina	
2011	Machine Gun Preacher	Paige's Friend	as Amanda Carlson
2012	Mary's Buttons	Bessie	
2012	Little Shadows	Amy	Short Film
2013	The Dead Kid	Annie Baxter	Starring role
2014	Naked Angel	Little Girl Without Faith	Filmed in 2009
2014	Small Town Santa	Kara Langston	Original title "Holiday Miracle"
2015	A Horse For Summer	Summer Dean	Starring role
2015	The Sparrows: Nesting	Di	
2015	Deadly Sanctuary	Tiffany	
2015	A Horse Tale	Chloe Thompson	Starring role, Original title "A Christmas Promise"
2016	Fishes 'N Loaves: Heaven Sent	Chrissy Michaels	Starring role, Lionsgate releasing 9/6/2016
2018	Mimesis: Nosferatu	Amy Peterson	Supporting

=== Television ===
Year	Title	Role	Notes
2012	CSI: NY	Kelly Dupars	Episode 908: "Late Admissions"
2012	Jimmy Kimmel Live!	Sister	Episode 10.292
2013	Brenda Forever	Young Brenda Miller	NBC Pilot
2013	Scandal	Annie Stanner	Episode 216: "Top of the Hour"
2013	Totally!	Amy	Pilot
2015	I Didn't Do It	Paula	Episode 2.4: "Lindy & Logan Get Psyched!"
2015	Grey's Anatomy	Jessica Tanner	Episode 12.1: "Sledgehammer"
2016	Roadside Stars	Sam Lambert	Episode 1.1: ""
2018	Class Act	Courtney	Recurring (Season 1-2):4 Episodes
2018	Hilton Head Island	Katy Trisk	Recurring (Season 2):6 Episodes

== Awards and nominations ==
Association	Year	Category	Nominated work	Result	Ref
Young Artist Awards	2013	Best Performance in a TV Series Guest Starring Young Actress 11-13 years	CSI:NY CSI: NY (season 9)	Nominated	
Young Artist Awards	2014	Best Performance in a TV Series Guest Starring Young Actress 14-16 years	Scandal Top of the Hour	Nominated	
Young Artist Awards	2015	Best Performance in a Film for DVD	Small Town Santa	Won	
Young Artist Awards	2016	Best Performance in a Film for DVD Young actress	A Horse For Summer	Won	
Young Artist Awards	2016	Best Performance in a TV series Guest Starring Young Actress (14 – 21)	Grey's Anatomy Sledgehammer (Grey's Anatomy)	Won	
Young Entertainer Awards	2016	Best Performance in an Independent or Film Festival -Feature Film (15-21)	A Horse For Summer	Won	
Young Entertainer Awards	2016	Best Guest Starring Young Actress 14 to 16 - TV Series	Grey's Anatomy Sledgehammer (Grey's Anatomy)	Nominated	
