= Seven Fifty-Two =

- Scandal episode
- Episode no.: Season 2 Episode 19
- Directed by: Allison Liddi-Brown
- Written by: Mark Fish
- Original air date: April 25, 2013

Guest appearances
- Scott Foley as Jake Ballard; George Newbern as Charlie; Joe Morton as Mysterious Man; Stoney Westmoreland as Hal Rimbeau; Jasika Nicole as Kim; Jordan Carreras as Javi

Episode chronology
← Previous "Molly, You in Danger, Girl"	Next → "A Woman Scorned"

"Seven Fifty-Two" is the nineteenth episode of the second season of Scandal. It premiered on April 25, 2013 in the U.S.

The show was teased a Huck centric show that would provide more information on his origins.

Showrunner Shonda Rhimes revealed that Jasika Nicole would guest star in the episode on March 13, 2013.

== Plot ==
In a flashback from 5 years ago, Olivia talks to a bearded and homeless Huck at the train station.

Olivia is lying in her hospital bed being watched over by Fitz, who tries to get close to her. They argue, and Olivia tells him she does not believe him when he tells her he loves her. Fitz walks out and discusses the attack with Jake.

Quinn, Abby, and Harrison are watching over a frightened Huck, who is constantly repeating the phrase “Seven Fifty-Two.”

Fourteen years ago, Huck, in a military uniform, surprises a woman reading to children in a library. They are shown lying in bed at home, as he explains how he has been taking tests and was able to leave his tour early.

Huck is sitting in a nondescript room and is being offered a position to be a part of B-613 while Charlie watches over. The man offering the job explains how Huck is very gifted and they would like to use his skills and train him. Huck agrees to take the job.

Harrison is arguing with Hal and Tom trying to see Olivia in the hospital. Charlie is seen spying with a baseball cap and makes a call that Harrison spots. Harrison chases him, but Charlie escapes in an elevator. Harrison goes back to Pope and Associates to update Abby and Quinn.

Charlie is seen explaining to a worried looking Huck how the job is to torture and kill people in order to get information. Huck is shown on his first job, torturing, killing, and cleaning up the dead body. Afterwards he and Charlie discuss how they enjoy it.

Olivia is still in the hospital, talking on the phone to Harrison about Huck. Quinn is trying to comfort Huck and tells him she will help fight whatever is hurting him. Huck doesn’t budge or stop repeating “Seven Fifty-Two.”

The woman, Kim, tells Huck that she’s pregnant; they talk and Huck proposes. Huck is shown on the job once again, obviously finding joy in the torture, as he begins collecting watches from everyone he kills. He and Kim buy a house, get married and have a son.

Cyrus visits Fitz, who is still waiting in the hospital for Olivia, and is not happy that reporters are catching on to him. Jake joins them, and Fitz introduces the two.

Abby is trying to comfort Huck similarly to how Quinn was. She explains how she will always choose Olivia because she saved her from her abusive husband.

Huck comes home to Kim in the kitchen with their son and Charlie. Charlie explains to Huck how he needs to lose his family, as that was what he promised when he joined B-613. Later that night, Huck tries to get Kim to run away with him, and leaves to go get money from the bank. Huck is taken and thrown into a sealed hole.

Harrison is the next to try to talk Huck out of it, and explains how he is going to sit there for however long Huck needs.

Huck is seen in the hole, continuously being asked if he has a wife and child. Many days pass, as evident to Huck continuing to go crazier and look dirtier. Charlie is given an order of 2 months as he watches over the hole Huck is in.

Hal explains to Mellie that Olivia is in the hospital and Fitz is watching over her. Fitz brings Olivia clothes and Olivia yells at him to leave. They argue about the election and Olivia tells Fitz she loves him. Fitz asks for another chance, they kiss, and Olivia leaves.

Fitz returns to Mellie at the White House, who tells him she is leaving and moving across the street with Teddy, yet will keep quiet to the press. She tells him to choose her or else she will tell the press everything.

Cyrus calls Charlie and tells him to investigate Jake and Olivia. Jake joins the mysterious man on the bench and explains how he feels there is a conflict of interest with the assignment, but the man doesn’t budge.

Huck denies that he has a wife or son and is finally let out of the hole. He cleans up and is immediately put on his first assignment back. Huck is unable to torture the man, and Charlie pulls a gun on him. He explains how command told him to kill him, but changes his mind and lets Huck go free. Charlie is shown talking to the mysterious man and tells him Huck is dead.

Olivia comes back from the hospital and talks to Huck, explaining how she needs him to come back and that he saved her when she found him in the train station. He breaks his silence and talks about how he thinks he has a family, and they both get up off the floor.

Back in the train station, Huck sees his former wife and his grown son, who hands him money before walking away at 7:52 am.

== Production ==
Darby Stanchfield who played Abby on the show revealed that during the table read "there wasn't a dry eye around the table".

== Reception ==
Ryan McGee writing for The A.V. Club gave the episode a B+.
