= International Amateur Theatre Association =

Non-governmental organisation to support amateur theatre

- Formation: 1952; 74 years ago
- Headquarters: Legal Address: Bruxelles-Ixelles
- President: Sofia Wegelius
- Website: https://www.aitaiata.net/

The International Amateur Theatre Association (AITA/IATA asbl) is a worldwide non-governmental organization consisting of Member (National Centres) and Associate members focused on fostering understanding and education through amateur theatre. Established in Belgium in 1952, the association's members operate in more than 54 countries and self-governing territories across five continents. The current President is Sofia Wegelius from Finland, and the organization’s Secretariat is located in Debrecen, Hungary.

== Goals ==
AITA/IATA aims to promote cross-border cooperation, artistic development, and cultural exchange through theatre. The organization has been involved in various activities over the past decades, including World Congresses, international festivals, workshops, symposia, publications, training programs, and support for cultural events. AITA/IATA is affiliated with UNESCO and plays a role in facilitating collaboration among its members.

== Governance ==
Governing bodies The General Assembly (GA) is held annually and serves as the highest decision-making body of AITA/IATA. Every fourth assembly takes place in Monaco. The most recent General Assembly was held in August 2026 in Antwerp, Flanders, Belgium.

International Theatre Festival Alongside the General Assembly, an International Theatre Festival is organized where selected amateur theatre groups perform, participate in workshops, and share their experiences. Recent festivals have taken place in locations such as Westouter, Belgium (2015), Monaco (2017), Lingen, Germany (2018), Saint John, Canada (2019), International Online Festival of Amateur Theatre "THEATRE IS MY LOVE" (2020), Monaco (2021), Hungary (2023), Lingen, Germany and Monaco (2025), Flanders, Belgium (2026).

The Council of AITA/IATA The Council is responsible for executing decisions made by the General Assembly, managing the association’s administration, preparing policies, and proposing new projects and programs for consideration.

== Membership ==
AITA/IATA has two types of membership:

- Members (National Centres) – These are organizations coordinating amateur theatre groups in their respective countries. Each country has one National Centre, which pays an annual fee based on the country's classification in the UN HDI Index.
- Associates – These include organizations, groups, individuals, or festivals interested in amateur theatre. Associates pay a smaller subscription fee and gain access to AITA/IATA’s international network.

== Events ==
World Festival of Children's Theatre The World Festival of Children's Theatre, first held in Lingen, Germany in 1991, is organized biennially. It alternates between Lingen and other cities worldwide, such as Toyama, Japan (2000), Havana, Cuba (2004), and Moscow, Russia (2008). The festival scheduled for 2020 in Toyama, has been canceled due to the COVID-19 pandemic.

Drama in Education Congress/Conference The AITA/IATA Drama in Education Congress has been held biennially since 1974 in Austria.

Mondial du Théâtre The World Festival of Amateur Theatre is held every four years since 1957 in Monaco.

== Anniversary ==
In 2002, AITA/IATA commemorated its 50th anniversary by publishing a booklet that reflects on the organization's growth and development. The booklet is available in English, French, and Spanish.

In 2027, AITA/IATA will mark its 75th anniversary.
