= What the Heck =

What the heck may refer to:

- What the Heck?, 1986 board game
- What the Heck Fest, a festival held in Anacortes, Washington
- "What the Heck I Gotta Do", song in the musical 21 Chump Street

== See also ==
- What the (disambiguation)
- What the Hell (disambiguation)
