= David Shafer (author) =

American author

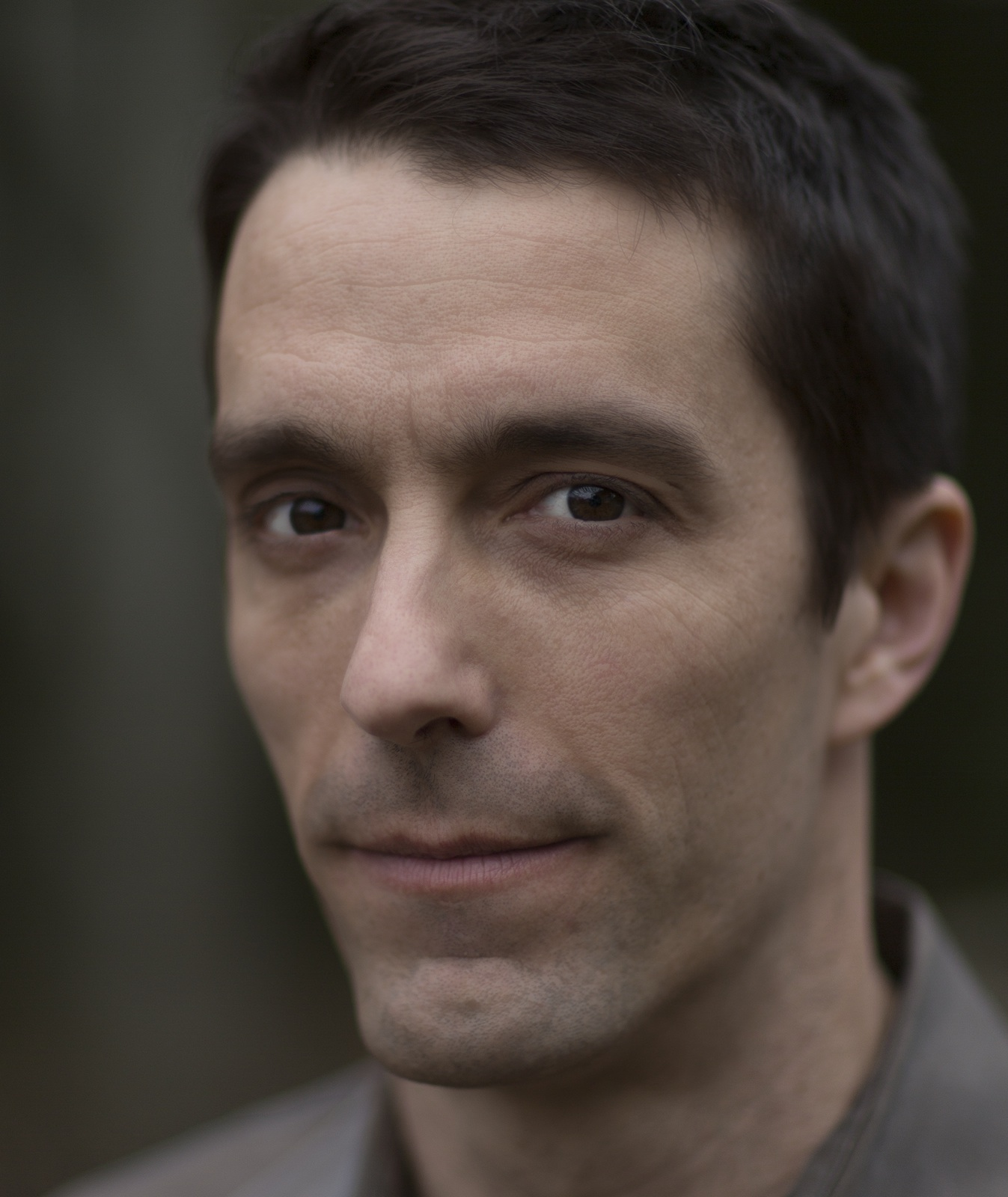
- David Shafer (photo by Patrick Abbey, 2014)
- Born: David J.C. Shafer; New York City, U.S.
- Education: Harvard College; Columbia School of Journalism
- Occupation: Novelist
- Writing career
- Genre: Fiction

David J.C. Shafer is an American author. His first novel Whiskey Tango Foxtrot was published by Mulholland Books on August 5, 2014. His work has appeared in The New York Times, Salon, The Irish Times, The Harvard Crimson, The Daily Beast, Willamette Week and Portland Monthly.

Born and raised in New York City, he graduated from Harvard College and the Columbia School of Journalism. He has lived in Dublin and Buenos Aires. David Shafer now lives in Portland, Oregon with his wife, daughter and son.
