= Welt-Kindertheater-Fest =

The Welt-Kindertheater-Fest (World Festival of Children's Theatre) bills itself as the first international children's theater festival featuring exclusively performances by children. The first festival took place in Lingen (Ems), Germany in 1990. Since then, it has been staged on a bi-annual basis, the location alternating between its "home town" Lingen (Ems), and various cities around the world.

== History ==
In 1981 Norbert Radermacher, created a programme for children's theatre at the theatre education centre TPZ Lingen. Two years later, the TPZ organized a small local event called Kinder spielen und tanzen für Kinder (Children play and dance for children).

Several years later Radermacher – by then the director of the TPZ – developed the idea of creating an international theatre festival for children, similar to the World Theatre Festival for adults. The first Welt-Kindertheater-Fest was developed and staged in Lingen in 1990, with cooperation from the "International Amateur Theatre Association" (IATA / AITA), the Children and Youth Theatre Centre of the Federal Republic of Germany, and the International Children Theatre Corporation (ICTC).

Since then the festival has been held every two years, its location alternating between Lingen and various cities around the world. The only exception in the first 30 years was the year 2012: the festival was supposed to take place in Sydney, but it was cancelled by the organiser. However, in the 2020s the COVID-19 pandemic seriously interrupted the tradition. The festival of 2020 in Toyama / Japan was cancelled due to the pandemic, and the following event was only to be announced for 2025.

== Locations ==
- 1990 – Lingen (Ems) / Germany
- 1992 – Antalya / Turkey
- 1994 – Lingen (Ems) / Germany
- 1996 – Copenhagen / Denmark
- 1998 – Lingen (Ems) / Germany
- 2000 – Toyama / Japan
- 2002 – Lingen (Ems) / Germany
- 2004 – Havana / Cuba
- 2006 – Lingen (Ems) / Germany
- 2008 – Moscow / Russia
- 2010 – Lingen (Ems) / Germany
- (2012 – Sydney / Australia – cancelled)
- 2014 – Lingen (Ems) / Germany
- 2016 – Stratford (Ontario) / Canada
- 2018 – Lingen (Ems) / Germany
- (2020 – Toyama / Japan – cancelled due to the COVID-19 pandemic)
- 2025 – Lingen (Ems) / Germany (announced)
