= WTF! (film) =

2017 American horror film

- Official poster
- Directed by: Peter Herro
- Screenplay by: Peter Herro; Christopher Lawrence Centanni; Adam Buchalter
- Produced by: Peter Herro; Kyle Zingler
- Starring: Callie Ott; Nicholas James Reilly; Andrea Hunt; Benjamin Norris; Sarah Agor
- Cinematography: Justin Kemper
- Edited by: Steve Parker
- Music by: A.J. Sealy
- Production company: Cthulhu Crush Productions
- Distributed by: Midnight Releasing
- Release date: August 1, 2017
- Running time: 80 minutes
- Country: United States
- Language: English

WTF! is a 2017 American horror film directed by Peter Herro. It was written by Herro, Christopher Lawrence Centanni and Adam Buchalter. It stars Callie Ott, Nicholas James Reilly, Andrea Hunt, and Johnny James Fiore, with a special appearance by Perez Hilton. The film follows a group of college friends onto their vacation at a secluded cabin. One by one, a killer works their way through the group, a killer who has links to an earlier massacre one of them previously survived.

== Plot ==
Years after narrowly escaping a mass slaughter that left her traumatized, Rachel reluctantly attends a Spring Break retreat with her friends. Her brother in tow, her borderline abusive boyfriend flirting with her girlfriends, and hangers-on along for the ride, the entire group decide to spend Spring Break in an isolated cabin in the woods. Hormones, secrets, and skinny-dipping abound, but there's a lingering danger around the edges of their adventure, creepy noises and strange happenings, including a nail through the foot of one of the girls.

When one of their group goes missing, only to turn up dead with his throat slit, trouble shifts to the forefront. A hooded figure stalks the group, one that is knocking each member off in a particularly nasty way from a stabbing to hairspray flames to the face. With bodies mounting and tempers flaring, Rachel realizes that what happened to her before is happening again. She's about to face off once again with the monster that killed her last group of friends. Unlike the last time, the only way out is to face down her tormentor and the twist to the murders that makes the deaths even more horrible than first revealed.

== Cast ==
- Callie Ott as Rachel
- Nicholas James Reilly as Toby
- Andrea Hunt as Bonnie
- Benjamin Norris as Jacob
- Sarah Agor as Lisa
- Johnny James Fiore as Sam
- Adam Foster as Bevan
- Perez Hilton as Donnie
- Shawn C Phillips as Bert
- Chloe Berman as Jessie
- Cheyann Dillan as Carla
- Nicolle Blair as WTF girl
- Adam Blake as Professor Pendleton
- Anna Sambrooks as Aunt Tracy

== Production ==
WTF! marked Peter Herro's feature film directorial debut after producing several short films. Pre-production lasted two years before a filming shoot of 12 days with 12-14 hour daily workloads. Produced by Cthulhu Crush Productions, it was filmed in the Los Angeles area.

== Release ==
On August 1, 2017 WTF! was released by Midnight Releasing on video-on-demand platforms such as Google Play, iTunes, Amazon Instant, Xbox, Vimeo, Steam, and Vudo, as well as a dvd release.

== Reception ==
In his review for Starburst magazine, John Townsend gave WTF! five stars from ten. He praised the originality in aspects of the script and its last act but felt it lacked sufficient depth, concluding: "... This is not a film to live long in the memory." Reviewing for Dread Central, Matt Boiselle gave one and a half stars from five, criticizing stereotypical characters, the premise, and a lack of creativity. Chris Coffel of Bloody Disgusting criticized the film's story as routine with formulaic characterisations, but he praised the performances and the depiction of the murders with good use of "practical effects". He concluded: " ... This wont go down as a classic and may not be something you re-visit very often but its enjoyable and worth a late night watch."
