= John Todora =

American sports data analyst (born 1970)

John Todora (born December 27, 1970) is an American entrepreneur and sports data analyst. He is best known as the creator and operator of several successful brands and is the creator of ScoreMetrics, which is an investment strategy that uses historical, backtested data as a basis. Media outlets have characterized Todora as a "sports expert" and formerly the "King of Internet Radio" thanks to his now defunct online radio show, The Dr Johnny Show.

== Early life ==
Todora grew up in Center Township, Pennsylvania. He attended Penn State and Florida International University majoring in advertising.

== Career ==
In 1999, Todora became the entertainment director and head of marketing for Tootsie's Cabaret in Miami, Florida. Todora was instrumental in designing and launching the new, redesigned Tootsies Cabaret. He became the creative director of Tootsies Cabaret in 2003, focusing on helping to build the brand throughout South Florida and the United States. Tootsies was purchased by a publicly traded company, RCI Hospitality Holdings, in 2007.

In 2007, Todora founded Creative Kitchen, a restaurant management and marketing company. In 2010, Todora founded Whiskey Tango All American Bar and Grill. In 2014, Todora founded Creative Kitchen International and opened Bull Market and Chow Asian Bistro in Fort Lauderdale.

In 2017, Todora founded ScoreMetrics, a method and algorithm that uses historical, back tested data to create sports as a new investment market.

=== Radio show ===
Todora hosted the online radio show known as the Smut Doctors partner Mike "Platypus" DeSuno. The show gained notoriety for its edgy content during the FCC crackdowns of 2005. During this time he was called "The King of Internet Radio", by Maxim Magazine and was featured in local South Florida magazines such as the Miami New Times as well as several national publications.

Todora was also regularly tabbed as a "Sports Expert" on ESPN, CNBC, NBA Channel, and Good Morning America.
