= Reactions to the United States diplomatic cables leak =

WikiLeaks began publishing the United States diplomatic cables leak on 28 November 2010. The documents included classified cables that had been sent to the U.S. State Department by its consulates, embassies, and diplomatic missions around the world. The cables were dated between December 1966 and February 2010, and contained assessments of host countries and their officials. The publication of the cables produced varying responses around the world.

== Official reactions ==
=== Asia ===
==== Afghanistan ====
- Finance minister of Afghanistan Omar Zakhilwal warned that leaks would damage his country's relations with United States Government and there would no longer be "business as usual". He denied his remarks in the U.S. embassy cable dated 26 February 2010 as "absolutely, categorically wrong and false".

==== Azerbaijan ====
- According to member of the National Assembly Rabiyat Aslanova, "politics does not have the concept of permanent friends or enemies" and "therefore Azerbaijan will conduct its policy as usual with respect to its national interests". Aslanova said in particular that "the publications in WikiLeaks will have no influence on Azerbaijani–Turkish relations since Turkey and Azerbaijan have already spoken on this issue and said these publications are of no importance to them".

==== China ====
- WikiLeaks' website was censored in China. Media reports about leaked information specifically related to China were also censored, although the leak incident itself was reported within China.

==== India ====
- External Affairs Minister S. M. Krishna said "India's government is not really concerned but we certainly are interested in finding out what this WikiLeaks are all about ..." [sic]

==== Iran ====
- Iranian president Mahmoud Ahmadinejad said "We don't think this information was leaked ... we think it was organised to be released on a regular basis and they are pursuing political goals."

==== Iraq ====
- The Iraqi foreign minister criticized the leak over detailed U.S. concerns in regards to alleged Iranian involvement in Iraq and called the leaks "unhelpful and untimely".

==== Israel ====
- Israeli Prime Minister Benjamin Netanyahu said the leak did not hurt Israel. He also expressed hope that Arab leaders would tell their own people what they say behind closed doors about their desire for an attack on Iran. Netanyahu stated that the documents show that "more and more countries, governments and leaders in the Middle East and in the world understand that [Iran's nuclear programme] is the fundamental threat." He also told reporters that the disclosures will make it harder for U.S. diplomats to be honest in their assessments and will make foreign leaders more cautious.

==== Japan ====
- Foreign Minister Seiji Maehara referred to the disclosure as a "monstrosity and a criminal act".

==== Pakistan ====
- Foreign Office spokesman Abdul Basit said "Pakistan is taking stock of the revelations concerning Pakistan". A statement issued by Prime Minister Yousuf Raza Gilani's office on his meeting with U.S. Ambassador Cameron Munter made two references to "vikilikes" [sic], describing it as "misleading" and "malicious".

==== Saudi Arabia ====
- Saudi Foreign Ministry spokesman Osama al-Naqli says the memos "do not concern us" and the kingdom has no insight into the authenticity of the documents and "we cannot comment on them". The former director General of Saudi Arabia's intelligence agency Al Mukhabarat Al A'amah, prince Turki bin Faisal Al Saud said that America's "credibility and honesty" had been damaged by the leaks. He described the cables as "a hodgepodge of selectivity, inaccuracy, agenda pursuit, and downright disinformation".

==== Singapore ====
- Singapore's Foreign Affairs Ministry expressed concern over the "damaging action of WikiLeaks".

==== Sri Lanka ====
- G. L. Peiris, Sri Lankan Minister of Foreign Affairs, denied the allegations made by the U.S. ambassador in Sri Lanka, stating "the conveying of such mendacious stories clearly fabricated to denigrate Sri Lanka, are totally negative to the objective of diplomacy, which is building bridges and promoting understanding". The government spokesman and Media Minister Keheliya Rambukwella said the leaks were "damning".

==== Turkey ====
- Prime Minister Recep Tayyip Erdoğan said "Let us see everything that comes from the site, then we will gauge how serious this is". Hüseyin Çelik, deputy leader of Erdogan's AKP (the majority party in Parliament), blamed Israel for the release of the documents and accused the Israeli government of trying to put pressure on Turkey through the release.

==== Republic of China (Taiwan) ====
- Defense Minister Hua-chu Kao downplayed the accuracy of all the leaks, especially those that mentioned Taiwan. He cited specifically a leak in which the U.S. allegedly asked Taiwan to sell SuperCobra AH-1W helicopters to Turkey. Minister Kao said it was the first time he had ever heard of such a deal, saying that Taiwan's own defense requirements would never have made the deal possible. Taiwan's military set up a "WikiLeaks Group" to verify leaked cables.

=== Africa ===
==== Tunisia ====
- Minister of Foreign Affairs Kamel Morjane said that "these leaks will have no effect whatsoever on the two countries' ties". He added that U.S. Secretary of State Hillary Clinton confirmed in both media interviews and in a telephone conversation that "the leaked cables were personal views of U.S ambassadors", not official opinions. He said that the cables detailing Tunisia's internal affairs were "baseless and do not mirror Tunisia's reality." Morjane questioned the believability of the cables.

=== Europe ===
==== Austria ====
- Stefan Hirsch, Speaker of Austrian Minister of Defence Norbert Darabos, said that he wanted clarification from the U.S. ambassador regarding comments in the cables that Darabos did not care about foreign-military interventions.

==== Finland ====
- Minister for Foreign Affairs Alexander Stubb said "the information shared between diplomats and their host countries is important and confidential, and although it is not illegal to have this information, leaking it outside the inner circles where it was meant to stay is irresponsible".

==== Italy ====
- Prime Minister Silvio Berlusconi laughed off the alleged content of the documents, and said: "I don't care what low-level officials say." Foreign Minister Franco Frattini described the leaks as the "September 11 of world diplomacy."

==== Poland ====
- Prime Minister Donald Tusk said that "Rumour goes that [the] Americans messaged themselves with regret that we negotiate too firmly, but if it is really in this correspondence, it's rather as [a] compliment than flashpoint".

==== Russia ====
- Russian prime minister Vladimir Putin warned the U.S., "Don't poke your noses into our affairs" after the release of materials. Minister of Foreign Affairs Sergei Lavrov called the revelations an "entertaining read", but said "on practical policy making we will take into consideration the deeds of our partners". Putin, on the other hand, said that the cables which described him as an "alpha-dog" "Batman" and President Dmitry Medvedev as "Robin" were "slanderous". Head of Russia's foreign intelligence service (SVR) Mikhail Fradkov said that he would ask his department to study the cables relating to Russia. On 9 December 2010, President Medvedev's office released a statement praising WikiLeaks and its founder Julian Assange and said that Assange should be awarded the Nobel Peace Prize.

==== Netherlands ====
- Foreign Affairs Minister Uri Rosenthal said "We do not know what the contents of the documents are, it would be guesswork. It could be that they contain names of Dutch politicians. We will wait patiently, but [will] remain alert".

==== United Kingdom ====
- A spokesperson for the British Foreign Office said that "We condemn any unauthorised release of this classified information, just as we condemn leaks of classified material in the UK ... they can damage national security, are not in the national interest and ... may put lives at risk".

==== Vatican City ====
- The Vatican has called the cables' descriptions of its internal affairs as a matter of "extreme seriousness". The Vatican said that the cables "reflect the perceptions and opinions of the people who wrote them and cannot be considered as expressions of the Holy See itself".

=== North America ===
==== Canada ====
- Lawrence Cannon, Canadian Minister of Foreign Affairs, condemned the leak, saying, "Irresponsible leaks like these are deplorable and do not serve anybody's national interests. The perpetrators of these leaks may threaten our national security." Cannon stated that the leaks will not harm Canada's relationship with the U.S., saying, "I do find it deplorable that documents like this are leaked in this fashion, but I want to reassure everybody that I don't think this is going to change the strong relationship that we have with the United States."

==== Jamaica ====
- Dwight Nelson, Jamaican Minister of National Security, stated that Cuban concerns about Jamaican drug trafficking reported in a leaked diplomatic cable — dated 11 August 2009 by Jonathan Farrar, the chief of mission at the United States Interests Section in Havana — were "absolute rubbish".

==== Mexico ====
- The Mexican President, Felipe Calderón said that United States diplomatic cables criticising Mexico's anti-drug fight had caused "severe damage" to its relationship with the United States and suggested tensions had risen so dramatically that he could no longer work with the American ambassador in his country. The result was the resignation of Ambassador Carlos Pascual on 19 March 2011.

==== United States ====
- The White House issued a statement saying the leak "puts at risk our diplomats, intelligence professionals, and people around the world who come to the United States for assistance in promoting democracy and open government".
- Hillary Clinton, representing the U.S. State Department, said, "This disclosure is not just an attack on America's foreign policy interests ... it is an attack on the international community: the alliances and partnerships, the conversations and negotiations that safeguard global security and advance economic prosperity ... It puts people's lives in danger, threatens our national security and undermines our efforts to work with other countries to solve shared problems."
- On 3 January 2011, the US Presidential Executive Office issued a memorandum to the heads of executive departments and agencies asking whether they have an "insider threat program", and whether they use psychiatrists and sociologists "to measure relative happiness as a means to gauge trustworthiness" and "despondence and grumpiness as a means to gauge waning trustworthiness".

=== Oceania ===
==== Australia ====
- During an interview on 29 November 2010, Australian Attorney-General Robert McClelland stated that "the leaking of this substantial amount of information is a real concern to Australia. The release of this information could prejudice the safety of people referred to in the documentation and indeed, could be damaging to the national security interests of the United States and its allies, including Australia", and urged Australian news outlets to censor the contents of the leaks. He also stated that Assange's Australian passport may be revoked.
- Australian Prime Minister Julia Gillard, during an interview on 7 December 2010, called the release of the cables "grossly irresponsible" and illegal.
- Australian Foreign Affairs Minister Kevin Rudd blamed the U.S. for the leaks and not Assange. He also said he did not "give a damn" about criticism of him in the cables.
- Gillard referred the release of the cables to the Australian Federal Police (AFP) for evaluation. On 17 December 2010 the AFP announced that neither WikiLeaks nor Assange had committed any crime in Australia by leaking the United States government documents.

=== South America ===
==== Argentina ====
- In response to accusations of espionage, corruption and drug-dealing contained in the leaks, Chief of the Cabinet of Ministers Aníbal Fernández said "I'm not willing to give an entity to this stupidity" and that "this is a problem of the United States, not ours, of the seriousness of the information". Buenos Aires Cabinet Chief Horacio Rodríguez Larreta said that the leaks were "a shame for American diplomacy" and said that "(they) will have to give a lot of explanations in many countries to a lot of people."

==== Bolivia ====
- The office of the Vice President of Bolivia created a portal website (at vicepresidencia.gob.bo) for leaked cables related to Bolivia. The site acted as both a mirror for these cables as they are released, and a host of translations and quantitative analysis of the cables.

==== Brazil ====
- The Defense Ministry issued a statement saying "relations between Brazil and the United States, both in the diplomatic and military spheres, have increasingly deepened. However, any differences between the two countries become visible, as Brazil increases its importance in the international arena."

==== Chile ====
- Minister of Foreign Affairs Alfredo Moreno said "Wikileaks puts in risk the safety of the communications. To have'[th]em on disposal for any person, naturally that puts the United States in a difficult moment with this case ... it generates a difficulty and insecurity."

==== Ecuador ====
- Deputy Foreign Minister Kintto Lucas said that even though Ecuador's policy was not to meddle in the internal affairs of other countries, it was "concerned" by the information in the cables because it involved other countries, "in particular Latin America". He said Ecuador would offer Assange residency with "no conditions ... so he can freely present the information he possesses and all the documentation, not just over the Internet but in a variety of public forums." President Rafael Correa later stated that the offer by Lucas had "not been approved by Foreign Minister Ricardo Patiño - or the president", and Patiño himself retracted Lucas' statement by stating that the asylum matter "will have to be studied from the legal and diplomatic perspective".

==== Venezuela ====
- President Hugo Chávez said "I have to congratulate the people of WikiLeaks for their bravery and courage ... Somebody should study Mrs Clinton's mental stability ... It's the least you can do: resign, along with those other delinquents working in the state department".

== Opinion on the diplomatic cables leak ==
=== Academics ===
Columbia University Graduate School of Journalism, in a letter to president Barack Obama and Attorney General Eric Holder, mentioned, "while we hold varying opinions of Wikileaks' methods and decisions, we all believe that in publishing diplomatic cables Wikileaks is engaging in journalistic activity protected by the First Amendment". It also warned that overreaction to publication of leaked material in the press will be more damaging to American democracy than the leaks themselves.

Emily Berman, a lawyer from the Liberty and National Security Project at NYU Law School told David Weigel of Slate why calls for WikiLeaks to be labeled a Foreign Terrorist Organisation are unrealistic: "A definition of material support which includes that would be so broad that it could include scholarly research and op-eds ... If the State Department designated WikiLeaks as a terrorist organization, a law professor working on these issues would immediately be at risk of criminal prosecution".

Noam Chomsky, an Institute Professor and professor emeritus of linguistics at the Massachusetts Institute of Technology, told Amy Goodman on Democracy Now!, "Perhaps the most dramatic revelation ... is the bitter hatred of democracy that is revealed both by the U.S. Government – Hillary Clinton, others – and also by the diplomatic service". Chomsky also described Representative King's call for WikiLeaks to be named a "foreign terrorist organization" as "outlandish".

=== Government ===
==== WikiLeaks Task Force (WTF) ====
Upon the release of the classified materials, the CIA launched a task force to assess its impact on diplomatic relations of United States. Officially, the panel was called the WikiLeaks Task Force. However, The Washington Post reported that at CIA headquarters it is identified by its "all-too-apt acronym" W.T.F. which refers to the popular internet slang, "What the fuck?". The main focus of the task force was the immediate impact of the most recently released files. It examined whether the agency's ability to recruit informants could be damaged by declining confidence in the US government's ability to keep secrets.

=== Diplomats ===
Scott Gilmore wrote in The Globe and Mail that based on his experience as a Canadian diplomat in Indonesia the leak "is not a real victory for a more open world. It will lead to a more closed world, where repressive governments will be more free to commit atrocities against their own people and the people who try to stop them will have even less information to help prevent this".

Jonathan Powell, a British diplomat for sixteen years and Tony Blair's Chief of Staff, wrote: "It is very difficult to conduct diplomacy effectively when your confidential deliberations are made public in this way. Mutual trust is the basis of such relations and once that trust is breached, candid conversations are less likely. It is like having a conversation in the pub with your best mate about problems with your girlfriend and then finding the content, possibly with a bit of spin added, posted on the internet. You won't be having that conversation again any time soon."

=== Politicians ===
U.S. Secretary of State Hillary Clinton condemned the leak as an attack not just on the U.S. but on all governments arguing that the leak was

not just an attack on America's foreign policy interests. It is an attack on the international community, the alliances and partnerships, the conversations and negotiations that safeguard global security and advance economic prosperity.

Clinton's credibility was questioned by several mainstream American and British periodicals, as some journalists, as well as Venezuelan president Hugo Chávez, called for Clinton to resign or asked whether she will resign, amid allegations that Clinton broke international law or other laws by allegedly trying to steal credit card numbers, passwords, and biometric data from the Secretary-General of the United Nations Ban Ki-moon and other leaders, and as future cable leaks or the current ones may bring investigations against Clinton.

The publishing of a cable from the U.S. State Department sent in February 2009, titled the Critical Foreign Dependencies Initiative, listed foreign installations and infrastructure considered critical to U.S. interests; before its release, WikiLeaks removed the names and locations. The list included key facilities that if attacked could disrupt the global supply chain and global communications, as well as goods and services important to the U.S. and its economy. U.S. State Department spokesman P.J. Crowley said the disclosure of this list "gives a group like al-Qaeda a targeting list." In response, WikiLeaks spokesman Kristinn Hrafnsson said with reference to the cable: "This further undermines claims made by the US Government that its embassy officials do not play an intelligence-gathering role. In terms of security issues, while this cable details the strategic importance of assets across the world, it does not give any information as to their exact locations, security measures, vulnerabilities or any similar factors, though it does reveal the US asked its diplomats to report back on these matters."

U.S. Senate Minority Leader Mitch McConnell called Assange "a high-tech terrorist".

U.S. Representative Peter T. King, the ranking member of the United States House Committee on Homeland Security said that the release "posed a clear and present danger to the national security of the United States" and that it "manifests Mr. Assange's purposeful intent to damage not only our national interests in fighting the war on terror, but also undermines the very safety of coalition forces in Iraq and Afghanistan. What I'm concerned about is the analysis of these documents" stating that "there are two things that are most damaging: 1. Yemen and Pakistan and the sensitive negotiations on nuclear proliferation underway. And, second, Saudi Arabia siding with the U.S. against Iran". He called for Assange to be prosecuted for espionage, and asked the U.S. Attorney General Eric Holder to "determine whether Wikileaks could be designated a foreign terrorist organization", and that "by doing so we can seize their assets". New York attorney in international law and human rights Scott Horton responded by saying:

In fact, the term 'foreign terrorist organization' (FTO) is established in section 219 of the Immigration and Nationality Act, which empowers the Secretary of State (not the attorney general) to apply that label to foreign organizations, with immediate and severe consequences for those so labeled and those who communicate or deal with them in any way. The Secretary of State does not have carte blanche in this process. To qualify as an FTO, an organization must have been engaged in 'terrorist activity' or 'terrorism,' which are defined to include multiple acts of violence threatening U.S. persons or the national security of the United States. An organization cannot plausibly qualify as a 'terrorist organization' simply by publishing documents that embarrass the government or particular politicians.

U.S. Congressman Ron Paul (R) from Texas said "in a society where truth becomes treason, we are in big trouble". He responded to the leaks by asking the American people to consider a list of nine questions. Under Number 5 and 6 he asked

Number 5: Which has resulted in the greatest number of deaths: lying us into war or Wikileaks revelations or the release of the Pentagon Papers? Number 6: If Assange can be convicted of a crime for publishing information that he did not steal, what does this say about the future of the first amendment and the independence of the internet?

Regarding the accusations of treason, he called the desire to charge Assange, an Australian citizen, for treason "wild", but also asked the general question:

Number 8: Is there not a huge difference between releasing secret information to help the enemy in a time of declared war, which is treason, and the releasing of information to expose our government lies that promote secret wars, death and corruption?

British Prime Minister David Cameron said the list was damaging to the national security of both his country and the United States, "and elsewhere".

Chair of the Intelligence and Security Committee Malcolm Rifkind criticized the leaks on the grounds that the leaking of genuine secrets undermines the trust between diplomats required for diplomatic negotiations.

Australian Prime Minister Julia Gillard branded WikiLeaks as "grossly irresponsible", arguing that a submarine cable link to Australia from the United States that included the details of critical infrastructure "would not be on Wikileaks if an illegal act hadn't taken place."

Brazilian President Luiz Inácio Lula da Silva, expressed his "solidarity" with Assange following Assange's 2010 arrest in the United Kingdom. He criticised the arrest of Julian Assange as "an attack on freedom of expression".

=== Military ===
Chairman of the Joint Chiefs of Staff, Michael Mullen, said, "Mr. Assange can say whatever he likes about the greater good he thinks he and his source are doing, but the truth is, they might already have on their hands the blood of some young soldier or that of an Afghan family." Assange said that there was no evidence of harm being caused by the release and that Wikileaks treated the revelation of names seriously and had asked the US government, through Wikileaks' publishing partner The New York Times, for help in identifying names in the documents prior to publication. Assange said "...it's really quite fantastic that Gates and Mullen ... who have ordered assassinations every day, are trying to bring people on board to look at a speculative understanding of whether we might have blood on our hands. These two men arguably are wading in the blood from those wars."

=== Individuals ===
Pentagon Papers whistleblower Daniel Ellsberg said that Assange "is serving our democracy and serving our rule of law precisely by challenging the secrecy regulations" and that the leak's ramifications for the U.S.'s national security "is extremely low".

Phyllis Bennis, a senior analyst with the think-tank Institute for Policy Studies and founder of the U.S. Campaign to End Israeli occupation, told Paul Jay of The Real News Network that Clinton's orders of spying on U.N. leaders showed that George W. Bush's style is still around.

Daniel Flitton, diplomatic editor for The Age, wrote that "Government embarrassment over this disclosure should not be confused with damage to the good of the nation. (sic) The full detail of the leak remains to be explored, but the public has gained a rare insight into the workings of government".

United Nations Special Rapporteur for Freedom of Opinion and Expression Frank LaRue said Assange or other WikiLeaks staff should not face legal action for any information they disseminated, noting that, "if there is a responsibility by leaking information it is of, exclusively of the person that made the leak and not of the media that publish it. And this is the way that transparency works and that corruption has been confronted in many cases." Similarly, writing in the American Spectator, Alex Massie defended Wikileaks on the grounds that it is, like any other major media outlet, a news publisher.

Australian journalist John Pilger said the leaks by WikiLeaks and others were part of a larger struggle against "powerful institutions bent on curtailing our knowledge of and influence over policies and structures that impact our lives: they are information heroes, not information villains".

Henry Porter, writing in The Observer on 11 December, established a parallel with events in 1771. At that time British law prohibited reporting of U.K. parliamentary debates and speeches because those in power argued that the information was too sensitive and would be disruptive if published. John Wilkes and others illegally published debates, with the eventual support of the London mob, shopkeepers and members of the gentry. Porter said: "From that moment, the freedom of the press was born ... and the kingdom did not fall."

Glenn Greenwald wrote in Salon, "The WikiLeaks disclosure has revealed not only numerous government secrets, but also the driving mentality of major factions in our political and media class. Simply put, there are few countries in the world with citizenries and especially media outlets more devoted to serving, protecting and venerating government authorities than the U.S. Indeed, I don't quite recall any entity producing as much bipartisan contempt across the American political spectrum as WikiLeaks has: as usual, for authoritarian minds, those who expose secrets are far more hated than those in power who commit heinous acts using secrecy as their principal weapon". Greenwald criticized one prominent New York Times article on Assange by John F. Burns as a "sleazy hit piece". Burns defended his article, saying it was an "absolutely standard journalistic endeavour". Marc Lynch wrote in Foreign Policy that "my initial skepticism about the significance of this document leak, fueled by the lack of interesting revelations in The New York Times and The Guardian reports, is changing as I see the first batch of cables posted on WikiLeaks itself."

John Nichols of The Nation wrote that "Reasonable people may debate the way in which WikiLeaks obtains and releases classified documents. But for [White House Press Secretary Robert] Gibbs to try and claim that transparency and openness [has put at risk the cause of human rights] is intellectually and practically dishonest".

Republican 2008 U.S. vice-presidential candidate Sarah Palin denounced the Obama administration's approach, calling Assange "an anti-American operative with blood on his hands" and asking "Why was he not pursued with the same urgency we pursue al Qaeda and Taliban leaders?" She said, "What if any diplomatic pressure was brought to bear on NATO, EU, and other allies to disrupt WikiLeaks' technical infrastructure? Did we use all the cyber tools at our disposal to permanently dismantle WikiLeaks? Were individuals working for WikiLeaks on these document leaks investigated? Shouldn't they at least have had their financial assets frozen just as we do to individuals who provide material support for terrorist organizations?" On Twitter she posted, "Inexplicable: I recently won in court to stop my book 'America by Heart' from being leaked", she wrote, "but US Govt can't stop Wikileaks' treasonous act?" Republican Rick Santorum agreed with Palin, saying "We haven't gone after this guy, we haven't tried to prosecute him, we haven't gotten our allies to go out and lock this guy up and bring him up on terrorism charges." Republican 2008 presidential primary contender Mike Huckabee called for the person who leaked the documents to be executed for treason.

Former U.S. House speaker Newt Gingrich said, "Information terrorism, which leads to people getting killed, is terrorism, and Julian Assange is engaged in terrorism. He should be treated as an enemy combatant."

Tom Flanagan, a former advisor to the Canadian Prime Minister Stephen Harper, stated on 30 November 2010: "I think Assange should be assassinated. President Obama should put a contract out on Assange's life or send out a drone to kill him. I would not be unhappy if Assange 'disappeared.'" The next day Flanagan attempted to retract his statements by saying "I never seriously intended to advocate or propose the assassination of Mr. Assange. But I do think that what he's doing is very malicious and harmful to diplomacy and endangering people's lives, and I think it should be stopped." A complaint was filed against Flanagan, stating that he "counselled and/or incited the assassination of Julian Assange contrary to the Criminal Code of Canada", in his remarks on the CBC program Power & Politics.

Scott Shane of The New York Times said "perhaps if we had had more information on these secret internal deliberations of governments prior to the invasion of Iraq in 2003, we would have had a better understanding of the quality of the evidence that Saddam Hussein had weapons of mass destruction. Secrecy is not always in the interests of governments or people".

Jon Stewart, host of The Daily Show, expressed cynicism about Assange's (and Wikileaks) descriptions of the importance of the release, as well as the ensuing media frenzy over the release. He blasted the Italian minister's equivalency of the leak to a diplomatic "9/11" and stated that Assange did not know just how much cynicism about the U.S. government is held by American citizens; thus, in Stewart's view, Assange should "stop with the drama".

Nancy Youssef of The McClatchy Company of newspapers wrote that "American officials in recent days have warned repeatedly that the release of documents by WikiLeaks could put people's lives in danger, but, despite similar warnings before the previous two releases of classified U.S. intelligence reports by the website, U.S. officials concede that they have no evidence to date that the documents led to anyone's death".

Bob Beckel, a Fox News Business commentator, said "This guy's a traitor, he's treasonous, and he has broken every law of the United States. And I'm not for the death penalty, so ... there's only one way to do it: illegally shoot the son of a bitch."

Daniel Yates, a former British military intelligence officer, wrote "Assange has seriously endangered the lives of Afghan civilians ... The logs contain detailed personal information regarding Afghan civilians who have approached NATO soldiers with information. It is inevitable that the Taliban will now seek violent retribution on those who have co-operated with NATO. Their families and tribes will also be in danger." Responding to the criticism, Assange said in August 2010 that 15,000 documents are still being reviewed "line by line", and that the names of "innocent parties who are under reasonable threat" will be removed. This was in response to a letter from a White House spokesman. Assange replied to the request through Eric Schmitt, a New York Times editor. This reply was Assange's offer to the White House to vet any harmful documents; Schmitt responded that "I certainly didn't consider this a serious and realistic offer to the White House to vet any of the documents before they were to be posted, and I think it's ridiculous that Assange is portraying it that way now."

Jack Goldsmith, a former OLC official in the Bush administration, has written that Assange is "being unduly vilified" and though he does not like the leaks, "it is not obvious what law he has violated". Furthermore, "[i]t is also important to remember ... that the responsibility for these disclosures lies firmly with the institution empowered to keep them secret: the Executive branch." He does not understand "why so much ire is directed at Assange and so little at The New York Times", as in his opinion the disclosure by that organisation of the secret surveillance program in 2005–2006 was arguably "more harmful to national security than the wikileaks disclosures". He also points out the hypocrisy of the government in attacking WikiLeaks when "its top [Obama administration] officials openly violat[ed] classification rules and opportunistically reveal[ed] without authorization top secret information" when assisting Bob Woodward with his book Obama's Wars.

=== Media outlets ===
A 29 November 2010 article in The Economist defended the leaks stating that "if secrecy is necessary for national security and effective diplomacy, it is also inevitable that the prerogative of secrecy will be used to hide the misdeeds of the permanent state and its privileged agents".

In an open letter to prime minister Julia Gillard, some of Australia's main media personnel said the U.S. and Australian governments' reaction to the release of diplomatic correspondence by the WikiLeaks website is "deeply troubling" and warned that they will "strongly resist any attempts to make the publication of these or similar documents illegal".

A 30 November 2010 Ottawa Sun editorial criticised the leak: "we see no for-the-good-of-the-people journalistic justification for WikiLeaks reckless sabotage of U.S. international relations".

Javier Moreno, editor-in-chief of El País, said that the release of the documents does not put lives at risk and that the attacks on such a release of information to the general public amount to the same reaction seen in other leaks, such as the Pentagon Papers in 1971. Moreno said that the only thing at risk is the career of officials and diplomats within the compromised governments.

Henry Porter, writing in The Observer, established a parallel with events in 1771. At that time British law prohibited reporting of parliamentary debates and speeches because those in power argued that the information was too sensitive and would be disruptive if published. John Wilkes and others illegally published debates, with the eventual support of the London mob, shopkeepers and members of the gentry. Porter says that "From that moment, the freedom of the press was born ... and the kingdom did not fall."

On 30 November 2010, Kathleen Troia "KT" McFarland, a national security analyst and host for Fox News, called Assange a terrorist, Wikileaks "a terrorist organization" and has called for Chelsea Manning's execution if she is found guilty of making the leaks.

A 2 December 2010 editorial by Jeffrey T. Kuhner in The Washington Times said Assange should be treated "the same way as other high-value terrorist targets" and be assassinated.

The Sydney Morning Herald ran an 8 December 2010 editorial by Bryce Lowry describing Assange as "the Ned Kelly of the digital age" comparing him to a bushranger who defied colonial authorities in Australia in the nineteenth century.

On 10 December 2010, Beijing Daily, a publication of the Beijing, China, city government, suggested in an editorial that this year's Nobel Peace Prize not be given to the imprisoned Chinese dissident Liu Xiaobo but to Assange.

Richard Stengel, managing editor of Time, defended the leaks, on 13 December 2010, arguing that although the release of classified materials harms American security, he noted the right of news organizations to publish those documents under the First Amendment. In that same edition of Time, Fareed Zakaria argued that cables leak show the competency, not duplicity, of American diplomacy as it shows "Washington pursuing privately pretty much the policies it has articulated publicly."

Some media outlets have criticized the subsequent attacks on WikiLeaks after the cables leak. "Not much truck with freedom of information, then, in the land of the free", Seumas Milne, a left-wing associate editor of The Guardian. Financial Times Deutschland said that "the already damaged reputation of the United States will only be further tattered with Assange's new martyr status".

=== Organizations ===
Amnesty International responded to the release of a 2006 memorandum discussing American misuse of Shannon Airport by asking the Irish Government to tighten its legislation to counter use of Irish airspace by the Americans. Colm O'Gorman, the organisation's executive director in Ireland, observed that concerns expressed by Irish citizens over the misuse of the airport by the Americans was "a problem to be managed rather than something to be taken seriously".

Reporters Without Borders condemned the subsequent blocking and the massive distributed denial-of-service attack on the WikiLeaks website. It also raised concerns over the extreme comments made by American authorities concerning WikiLeaks and Assange. It issued a statement saying

This is the first time we have seen an attempt at the international community level to censor a website dedicated to the principle of transparency. We are shocked to find countries such as France and the United States suddenly bringing their policies on freedom of expression into line with those of China.

Later, RWB decided to host a mirror site of WikiLeaks on the address wikileaks.rsf.org as a "gesture of support for WikiLeaks' right to publish information without being obstructed".

The American Civil Liberties Union issued a statement, beginning "The Wikileaks phenomenon — the existence of an organization devoted to obtaining and publicly releasing large troves of information the U.S. government would prefer to keep secret — illustrates just how broken our secrecy classification system is. While the Obama administration has made some modest improvements to the rules governing classification of government information, both it and the Bush administration have overclassified and kept secret information that should be subject to public scrutiny and debate. As a result, the American public has had to depend on leaks to the news media and whistleblowers to know what the government is up to".

Anonymous, the online community of activists, announced its support for Wikileaks by "declaring war" against enemies of Assange, calling on supporters to attack sites and companies that do not support WikiLeaks and to spread the leaked cables online. As of 8 December 2010, PostFinance.ch, a bank which terminated Assange's bank account, the office of the Swedish prosecutor, MasterCard and Visa have all been attacked and brought down by DDoS attacks. Anonymous has also declared PayPal a target.

=== Corporate responses ===
- Amazon.com dropped WikiLeaks from its servers on 1 December 2010 at 19:30 GMT, and the latter's website, wikileaks.org, was unreachable until 20:17 GMT when the site had defaulted to its Swedish servers, hosted by Bahnhof. U.S. Senator Joe Lieberman, among the members of the U.S. Senate Homeland Security and Governmental Affairs Committee who had questioned Amazon in private communication on the company's hosting of WikiLeaks and the "illegally" obtained documents, commended Amazon for the action; WikiLeaks, however, responded by stating on its official Twitter page that "WikiLeaks servers at Amazon ousted. Free speech the land of the free--fine our $ are now spent to employ people in Europe," and later that "If Amazon are so uncomfortable with the first amendment, they should get out of the business of selling books".
- On 30 November 2010, PayPal decided to freeze the WikiLeaks' account over "illegal" activity.
- EveryDNS, WikiLeaks' U.S. hosting provider, dropped WikiLeaks from its entries, citing DDoS attacks that "threatened the stability of its infrastructure which enables access to almost 500,000 other websites".
- Tableau Software, the company that provided visualisations of the contents of the leaked U.S. embassy cables removed them from the internet at the request of U.S. Senator Joe Lieberman. However, it commented that "this will inevitably be met with mixed reactions". James Ball, who created the visualisation, told "To pull these graphics — which had received over 2.4m visitors — merely because the Wikileaks website links to them; and a US senator issued a public (not private) complaint — smacks of cowardice and blind censorship."
- Visa Inc. suspended all payments to the organisation "pending further investigation". The Icelandic online payment company DataCell threatened to sue Visa, after it was ordered to suspend processing all transactions. Its founder, Ólafur Sigurvinsson, pointed out "I've got confirmed today that I am capable of supporting Al-Qaeda, Ku Klux Klan, buy weapons, drugs and all sorts of pornography with a VISA card. But that's not being investigated. Instead I can not support a humanitarian organisation fighting for the freedom of speech".
- MasterCard said it was "taking action to ensure that WikiLeaks can no longer accept MasterCard-branded products".
- WikiLeaks' Swiss-based host, SWITCH Information Technology Services, rejected growing international calls to force the site off the Internet. It stated that there was "no reason" why it [WikiLeaks] should be forced offline. Swiss Pirate Party, which registered the wikileaks.ch domain name, had also issued a statement that SWITCH had reassured the party that it would not block the site.
- On 20 December 2010, Apple Inc. pulled a WikiLeaks application from its App Store three days after its approval.
- Some companies have decided not to cut off their ties with WikiLeaks amidst the growing pressure. These companies include XIPWIRE, which stated that they are waiving fees and charges so that 100 percent of the money goes to the whistleblower site; Flattr, a micropayment system which was started by one of the founders of Pirate Bay; DataCell, whose chief executive officer commented "the suspension of payments towards Wikileaks is a violation of the agreements with their customers"; and OVH.
- Bank of America announced that it will not process transactions of any type that we have reason to believe are intended for WikiLeaks. It commented that "this decision is based upon our reasonable belief that WikiLeaks may be engaged in activities that are, among other things, inconsistent with our internal policies for processing payments".

== In popular culture ==
The WikiLeaks controversy has been satirized in American popular culture. An example is the Saturday Night Live skit "WikiLeaks TMZ", in which Julian Assange (Bill Hader) presents ambushes of political leaders to expose their corruption: Libya's Muammar Qaddafi (Fred Armisen) is caught with his Ukrainian nurse; Afghanistan's Hamid Karzai (Robert De Niro) is caught pocketing money; and Hillary Clinton is found not wearing any underclothes.

== See also ==
- Fruit of the poisonous tree, legal U.S. metaphor to describe evidence that is obtained illegally.
