= Whiskey Tango Foxtrot (novel) =

2014 novel by David Shafer

- Author: David Shafer
- Language: English
- Genre: Fiction
- Published: August 5, 2014
- Publisher: Mulholland Books; Little, Brown and Company
- Pages: 425pp
- ISBN: 978-0-316-25263-8
- OCLC: 880885338

Whiskey Tango Foxtrot is a 2014 debut novel by David Shafer.

== Plot ==
A pop thriller about a multinational cabal planning to subjugate humanity by privatizing all information.
