= Whiskey Tango Foxtrot (Scandal) =

- Scandal episode
- Episode no.: Season 2 Episode 14
- Directed by: Matt Byrne
- Written by: Mark Wilding
- Original air date: February 14, 2013

Guest appearances
- Scott Foley as Jake Ballard; Dan Bucatinsky as James Novak; Kurt Fuller as Grayden Osborne

Episode chronology
← Previous "Nobody Likes Babies"	Next → "Boom Goes the Dynamite"

"Whiskey Tango Foxtrot" is the fourteenth episode of the second season of the American television series Scandal. It premiered on February 14, 2013 on ABC. The episode marks the beginning of the 9 episode arc of the second half of Scandal which operated independently from the first half of the season.

The episode marks the first appearance of Scott Foley as Jake Ballard who later became a series regular.

== Plot ==
The episode begins ten months after the events of Nobody Likes Babies. Olivia flashes back to intimate moments she spent with Fitz while swimming in a pool. Meanwhile, Fitz drinks in the middle of his morning shower and is joined by Mellie. Cyrus interrupts them to inform Fitz that four American soldiers have been taken hostage in Kashfar.

Across town David Rosen wakes up beside the body of a slain woman. When the police knock on his door claiming that they are there to investigate a disturbance he brushes them off.

Olivia waits in line for her morning coffee and has her cellphone knocked out of her hand by a man (Scott Foley) who proceeds to flirt with her. She then receives a call from Abby and she joins her and the rest of their team at David's apartment where they gather that he was framed for the murder of Wendy Westerberg. Olivia offers to move Wendy's body out of David's apartment and back to her own house to deflect suspicion from David. As the gladiators try to investigate who would have framed David they discover that he now works as a high school teacher.

Fitz meets with the ambassador to Kashfar. Cyrus is confused as to why he has been shut out of the meeting but when he asks Fitz what is wrong Fitz denies that there is a problem.

Huck manages to hack into Wendy's files where he discovered photos of multiple nude men. The gladiators discover that Wendy blackmailed powerful men for stories which she sold to tabloids. They realize that she tried to seduce David in order to find out the truth about the voter fraud in Defiance. David grows suspicious that he was set up for the murder by Olivia and she in turn takes her suspicions to Cyrus. Cyrus denies involvement in David's set up. Meanwhile, David is taken in for questioning on suspicion of Wendy's murder though he quickly manages to deflect suspicion based on the ridiculousness of the prosecutor's claims.

Mellie and Cyrus meanwhile try to figure out whether Fitz knows about Defiance, as suggested by Olivia.

While trying to discover who murdered Wendy, Huck notices that her cell phone is ringing with the number belonging to someone in The Pentagon: Captain Jake Ballard. When Olivia goes to investigate she discovers that Jake Ballard is the man whom she flirted with earlier that morning. He is only able to tell her that Wendy offered him some information a few days previously. Before she leaves Jake invites her to dinner but Olivia declines.

Fitz decides to send a SEAL team in to save the U.S. soldiers but Cyrus convinces him to wait. Shortly after, on the way to the christening of Cyrus's child, Mellie admits to Defiance to Fitz and then tells him it was Cyrus's fault and that Fitz is right to attempt to cut him out. She then urges Fitz to listen to his instincts and send in the SEAL team.

At Ella's christening Olivia and Fitz exchange meaningful looks and at the party afterwards they break away to have sex in a mechanical closet. Afterwards Olivia confesses to Defiance but Fitz reiterates that they are over.

Directly afterwards he is called to watch the rescue of the soldiers and is shocked when there is no one at the building where the hostages are supposedly being kept. He is told that they have a mole.

Meanwhile, Abby goes to David to try and reconnect with him and he shuts her down. David accidentally discovers a flash drive in his apartment belonging to Wendy with secret military intel on it.

Taking a shower at the end of the day Fitz is joined again by Mellie but when she tries to initiate sex he screams at her before apologizing and crying.

Upon returning home, Olivia calls Jake in order to accept his invitation to dinner. As they discuss potential venues for their dinner date Jake sits down on his couch in front of a wall of TV screens displaying images of Olivia and the inside of her apartment.

== Production ==
News of Scott Foley's casting was revealed in January 2013. Foley had previously appeared on Grey's Anatomy, also created by Shonda Rhimes.

The shots of Olivia Pope swimming were included after Kerry Washington told Shonda Rhimes she was on the swim team in high school.
