= David Schafer =

American visual and sound artist (born 1955)

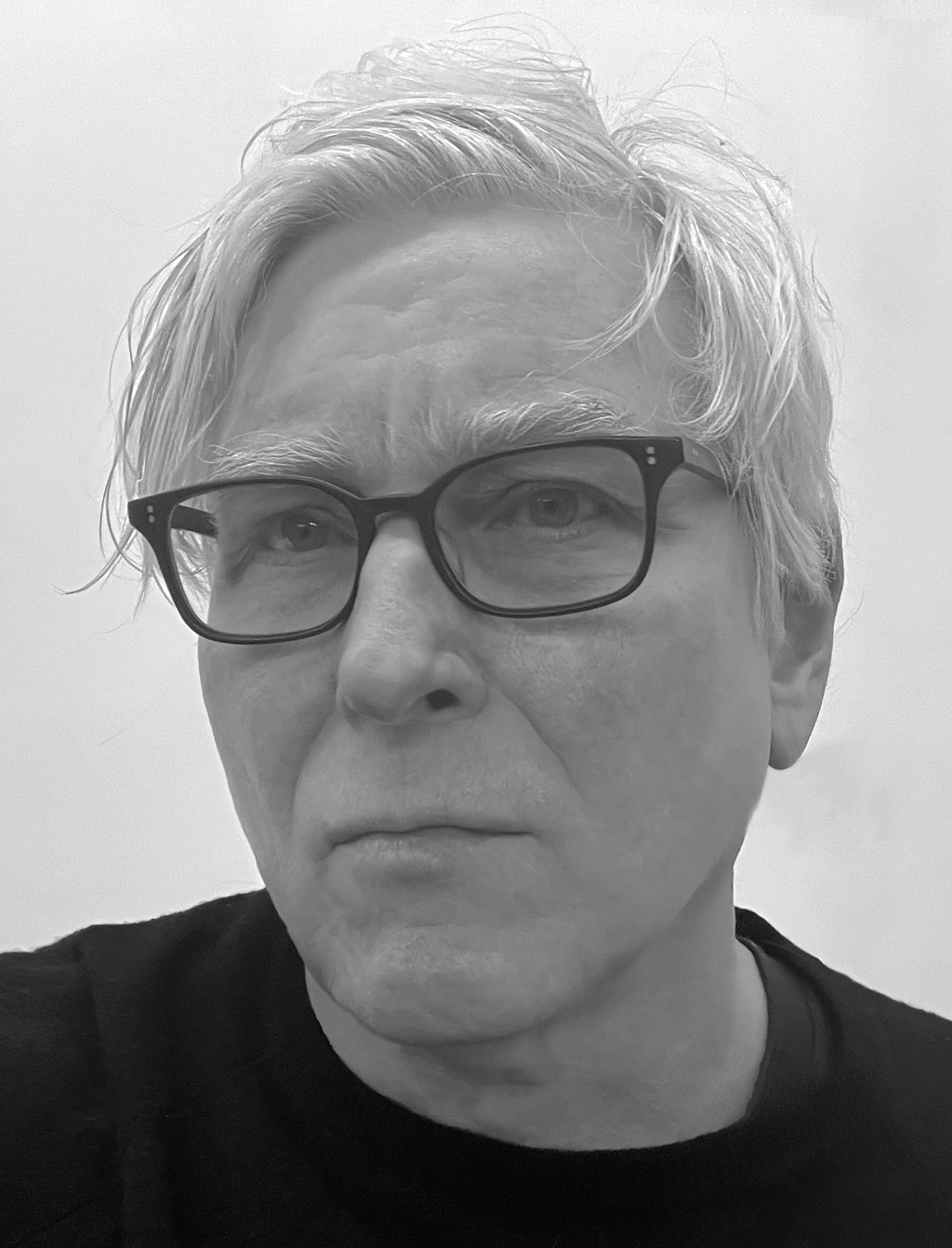
- Born: 1955 (age 70–71); Kansas City, Missouri, US
- Other name: DSE
- Education: University of Texas at Austin; University of Missouri–Kansas City; Kansas City Art Institute
- Known for: Sculpture, Installation art, Sound art, Noise music, Performance
- Awards: Pollock-Krasner Foundation, National Endowment for the Arts, COLA Cultural Trailblazer
- Website: davidschafer.org

David Schafer, Reflected Terrain, polished stainless steel and LED lighting, 101' x 6", 2025.

David Schafer (born 1955) is an American visual and sound artist based in Los Angeles. His practice integrates aural, textual, graphic and sculptural elements to create installations, public art and individual works that critics describe as immersive, spatial experiments. Schafer's approach combines self-consciously formalist aesthetics, a Pop Art sensibility, and postmodern Deconstructionist intent, often appropriating and reframing cultural motifs in order to investigate systems of historical and cultural memory, built space, and language. Los Angeles Times critic Leah Ollman describes his work as a "heady jumble" producing collisions, contradictions and convergences involving architecture, sound, sculpture, language and theory in order to "disrupt communication intentionally, incisively, through strategies of fragmentation and interruption."

Schafer has exhibited at the Whitney Museum, MoMA PS1, The Drawing Center, MASS MoCA, Baltimore Museum of Art, Long Beach Museum of Art, SculptureCenter, and Vleeshal Middelburg (the Netherlands). He has received awards from the Pollock-Krasner Foundation and National Endowment for the Arts, and commissions from the Public Art Fund and Los Angeles County Arts Commission. He has taught sculpture, art theory, digital media and sound on the East and West coasts since 1985, and is currently at ArtCenter College of Design in Los Angeles.

== Biography ==
Schafer was born in Kansas City, Missouri. He attended the Kansas City Art Institute, where he studied environmental graphics with Victor Papanek and was influenced by sculptor Dale Eldred. He completing a BFA at the University of Missouri–Kansas City in 1978 and earned an MFA in Sculpture and minor in Mechanical Engineering at University of Texas in 1983. Interdisciplinary work there with Peter Saul, Robert Yarber, John Baldessari, Vito Acconci and Siah Armajani influenced his understanding of the built world and use of social critique and humor. After moving to New York, he worked for artists Dennis Oppenheim and Alice Aycock; their use of research, historical and philosophical references, drawing, site specificity and public scale made a lasting impression on his work.

Schafer began to receive public recognition in the late 1980s, including an NEA award and the first of three Public Art Fund commissions (1988–93). While in New York, he exhibited at PS1, Artists Space, White Columns and Art in General, and began teaching at the School of Visual Arts (1985–96) and Parsons School of Design (1994–6).

In 1996, he moved to Los Angeles and expanded into sound works and performances. He taught at Otis College of Art and Design (1996–2000), Cal Arts (2002), and ArtCenter College of Design (1998–present), where he developed a sculpture program bridging fine arts, digital media and environmental design. After a return to New York and positions at Parsons and Cornell, he went back to ArtCenter in 2013, where he founded and developed the school's Sound Lab in Fine Art program and curriculum. In 2024, he received ArtCenter's part-time Great Teacher Award.

== Work ==
Because it is multidisciplinary, Schafer's work can be difficult to categorize; he has created sculpture, installations and public art projects that incorporate built structures, prints, sound elements and text, as well as sound works, all of which engage cultural and historical works and tropes whose ideas he reconfigures visually, spatially or sonically for reconsideration. Artforum critic Jan Tumlir traces Schafer's artistic strategies to his emergence in the 1980s amid the theoretical flowering of deconstruction and its critical dismantling of historical and cultural conventions, including modernism.

=== Sculpture and installations ===
Schafer's early art explored public and private space and perception, implicating sculpture as a staged experience and disrupting exhibition conventions through physical engagement. Folly (1986), Western Agenda (1991) and Model for Wild Harmony (1993) were skeletal, theatrical sculptures referencing Russian Constructivism that invited viewers to swing on them and ascend ladders or suspended platforms, subverting conventions by reversing the roles of observer and observed, audience and object.

David Schafer, Stepped Density, 30" x 48" x 48" each, 2001.

In the mid-1990s, Schafer incorporated digital printing and fabrication processes into works exploring social space, social control, consumption, cultural memory and everyday objects. Mother Mall (1996) was a large modular sculpture that resembled a quasi-organic space vessel or shopping mall model (including Muzak accompaniment) and referenced science-fiction and suburban dystopias. It was set on a ring of sawhorses surrounded by wall works appropriating banal, consumer-culture ephemera that critic Peter Frank deemed "suffused with the relentless cheesiness and ravenous narcissism of [various] verbal symptoms of our alienated stupefaction."

Cluster 38 (1997) and Stepped Density (1999–2001) reworked the ergonomics of fast-food furniture design and rules of public space, creating what The Washington Post called "Pop-artish, tongue-in-cheek" sculptures of geometric rigor and high finish "hovering in a perfect middle ground between high formalist aesthetics and low commercial culture." How High Is Up? (2003–4) took on architectural models, transforming a Three Stooges episode still of an improbable structure made out of chaotically arranged I-beams into a gleaming, Anthony Caro-like abstract sculpture; with detailed computer renderings and posters comically referencing Frank Gehry-style, deconstructivist architecture, Schafer enacted a cultural leveling, imbuing an object meant to represent human error and chaos with authority and rationality.

Spoken-word soundtracks and digital prints came to the fore in Schafer's work in the 2000s (much of it gathered in the retrospective exhibition, Models of Disorder, 2015). This later work investigated established history, language and truth through the lenses of patriarchy, modernism and pop-culture. What Should a Museum Sound Like? (2010, Whitney Biennial) presented a digitally fabricated, sound-equipped museum sculpture playing an actor's recording of text by the museum's architect, Marcel Breuer, distorted with sounds created by transcoding the site's floor plans and drawings with a sound design program. What Should a Painter Do? (2011) referenced a Barnett Newman painting series with text works, audio of Newman explaining his ideas, and a bare-bones, De Stijl-like sculptural installation. In both cases, the grand formalist theories referenced by the structures and recordings are undermined by garbled, chaotic soundtracks, suggesting alternative perspectives for assessing such claims to truth. Four Letters to Mahler (2013) explored similar strategies based on letters written by Arnold Schoenberg to Gustav Mahler.

In 2025, Schafer presented "Forum" (Phase Gallery), a solo exhibition of immersive environments merging sound, sculpture and visual elements. Referencing ancient Roman architecture (in the installations Pantheon and Colosseum), the show examined how contemporary social structures are shaped by coded signs, corporate spectacle and institutional influence.

David Schafer, Pastoral Mirage, multi-site installation, Prospect Park, Brooklyn, painted steel, aluminum, cables, turnbuckles and hardware, nylon; 23' x 8' x 8'; 1993; installation view.

=== Public projects ===
Schafer's early public art commissions include Model Q (1989, Chicago), Altered Sites (1988, Philadelphia), Plaza of the First Reader (1988, Brooklyn) and New Century Trellis (1993, MetroTech Center, Brooklyn). Liberty Prop (1991, in collaboration with architect Jeffrey Cole) was a gazebo-like installation in City Hall Park, a site of contemporary and Revolutionary-period demonstrations, including the first Sons of Liberty "Liberty Pole" display. The installation reflected on the complexities and contradictions of freedom, juxtaposing the rote memorization, oversimplification, and commodification endemic to American patriotic discourse with the site's commemoration of revolutionary thought, speech and action. It featured billboards with enlarged croppings of the American flag and commercial trademark symbols, bold colors and forms alluding to Russian Constructivist Agitprop, and structural elements (boardwalk, bridge, picket fence) whose practical functions were undermined; the billboard insides reproduced flashcard-like definitions and questions about the Constitution and Bill of Rights taken from a high school textbook.

Pastoral Mirage (1993) was a multi-site installation of fourteen large, yellow signs in Brooklyn's Prospect Park displaying enigmatic quotes from the park's designer, Frederick Law Olmsted, regarding the park as a work of art and vision. Challenging in their 19th-century form and bold, utilitarian design—as opposed to typical, decorative signage—the signs sought to restore the hidden narratives in Olmsted's vision, revealing the gap between his lofty intentions and present-day park usage. Critic Arlene Raven situated the work in the Community Arts tradition, observing that it "invites reflections on the future possibilities of peace embedded in an enduring heritage of past ideals," while also partaking in the "stormy entanglements" of contemporary public life—specifically, resistance and confusion among park-goers.

David Schafer, Separate United Forms, cast bronze, concrete, in-ground lighting sculptures; 7.5' x 12.5'; platform: 20' x 40'; 2009.

Schafer's later public works demonstrate a growing embrace of technology, sampling culture and sound. For Separated United Forms (2009, Huntington Hospital, Pasadena), he used a hand-held, 3D body scanner to appropriate forms from a Henry Moore marble work, Reclining Form (1966), which were digitally reconfigured and remixed into a final, biomorphic image that was cast without a physical prototype as a monumental pair of 1,500-pound bronze sculptures. The work's production and restaging of organic form outside the convalescent facility alludes to the colonization of the body in both art (e.g., Moore's abstract, biomorphic notion of "Vitalism") and the medical industry's technological gaze. The five-day, interdepartmental The Schoenberg Soundways (2015, USC) sought to recover the lost campus legacy of composer and former USC teacher, Arnold Schoenberg, whose archives there were moved to Vienna. In addition to live events, it featured campus delivery trucks outfitted with amplified speakers and informative signage, each playing a dedicated, repeated Schoenberg composition and intersecting randomly on indeterminant routes to create John Cage-like chance moments of sound.

In 2025, Schafer created the public work, Reflected Terrain, a 101-foot-long, polished stainless steel contour line representing the topography of a portion of the San Gabriel mountains, a commission for Artists and Makers Studios in San Gabriel Valley, CA.

=== Sound works and performances ===
Schafer has also produced electronic noise and processed recordings, live signal manipulation, programming events and live sound performance, using the moniker of DSE from 2009 to 2017. This work—like his other work—approaches sound as an expressive, malleable language, and often disrupts the structural authority of intelligibility, context and sonic/spatial orientation. An example of his sound writing appears in the anthology, Site of Sound Volume 2 (2011).

Schafer has performed sound at LACE, Human Resources and David Kordansky Gallery in Los Angeles, and Printed Matter, Inc., Silent Barn, The Invisible Dog Art Center and Roulette in New York, among other venues. His sound performance for the 2010 Whitney Biennial is included in the book Noise Channels: Glitch and Error in Digital Culture (2011), and his sound works have been included in curated radio programs in Lisbon, Paris, Glasgow, and Berlin. He staged Soundtrack for a Seascape, a public performance responding to a Barry Schwabsky poem, on the coast of Santa Monica in 2023.

For his two-CD collection, x10R.1–x1-R.2, Schafer re-sequenced ten easy-listening records and superimposed them on top of one another to create a dense, cacophonous blanket of non-stop sound that reviewers described as a disorienting, "seething musical Frankenstein" revealing the repressive and coercive side of Muzak. In 2013, he released DSENOISE, a limited-edition boxed set of 12 CDs. His composition "Binary Complex"—a work generated from a permutation based on the colors of a sculpture it was designed to accompany—was included in a The Wire magazine compilation CD in April 2025; in 2021, members of the Isaura String Quartet performed a musically scored version of that work, Tonal Duet, in Los Angeles.

== Recognition ==
Schafer has received awards from the Pollock-Krasner Foundation (2018), Center for Cultural Innovation (2015), USC Visions and Voices Initiative (2014), Los Angeles County Percent for Public Art Program (commission, 2006), National Endowment for the Arts (1989), Sculpture Chicago (1989), Artists Space (1986), and the Public Art Fund (commissions, 1989, 1991, 1993; residency, 1985). In 2025, he received the City of Los Angeles Department of Cultural Affairs "Cultural Trailblazer" Award recognizing regional innovators.
