= What the fuck =

What the fuck may refer to:

- an expression (also abbreviated as WTF), see Fuck § Modern usage
- What the Fuck, a 2005 album by Acumen Nation
- "What the Fuck...", a 1994 song by Brand Nubian song from Everything is Everything
- "What the Fuck", a 2007 song by Carbon/Silicon from their album The Last Post
- Loca People (What the Fuck!), a 2011 song by Sak Noel
- "What the Fuck", a 2013 song by fun from their extended play Before Shane Went to Bangkok: Live in the USA
- WTFPL (Do What the Fuck You Want To Public License)

== See also ==
- What the Bleep Do We Know!?, sometimes stylised as "What tнē #$*! D̄ө ωΣ (k)πow!?" and "What the #$*! Do We Know!?", a 2004 film purporting to link spirituality and quantum mechanics
- Star 69 (What the F**k), a 2001 song by Fatboy Slim
- WTF (disambiguation)
- What the (disambiguation)
